= Doug Reynolds (politician) =

American politician

Member of the West Virginia House of Delegates for the 16th District
- In office 2007–2013

Member of the West Virginia House of Delegates for the 17th District
- In office 2013–2017

Personal details
- Born: February 8, 1976 (age 50) Huntington, West Virginia, U.S.
- Party: Republican
- Other political affiliations: Democratic (until 2021)
- Education: Duke University; West Virginia University College of Law
- Website: Campaign website

Douglas Vernon Reynolds (born February 8, 1976) is an American politician, attorney, and businessman who was formerly a Democratic member of the West Virginia House of Delegates, representing District 17 from January 12, 2013, to January 2017. Reynolds served consecutively from January 2007 until January 2013 in the District 16 seat. In 2016, Reynolds decided against running for his seat again, instead opting to run for Attorney General of West Virginia. Reynolds is also the president of Energy Services of America, a pipeline construction company, and HD Media, the publisher of the Herald-Dispatch and five other newspapers throughout West Virginia.

== Early life and education ==
Reynolds grew up in Wayne, West Virginia, and graduated from Wayne High School in the same town. After graduating high school, Reynolds attended Duke University in Durham, North Carolina, where he earned his Bachelor of Arts in political science. After graduating from Duke, Reynolds attended the West Virginia University College of Law in Morgantown, earning his Juris Doctor. He later was granted admittance to the West Virginia State Bar.

== Career ==
=== Private sector ===
Reynolds has been the president and chief executive officer of Energy Services of America, a public holding company for energy and construction subsidiaries, since 2012. Along with this, Reynolds was the founder and a director for the First Bank of Charleston before it was purchased by Premier Bank Reynolds also serves on the boards of the United Way of the River Cities, Boys’ and Girls’ Clubs of Huntington, Prestera Foundation and the City of Huntington Foundation.

Reynolds is the founder and managing director of HD Media a publisher of weekly newspapers and magazines. The company currently owns several news publications across the state of West Virginia: The Herald-Dispatch in Huntington, the Charleston Gazette-Mail in Charleston, the Wayne County News in Wayne County, the Putnam Herald in Putnam County, the Williamson Daily News in Williamson, the Logan Banner in Logan, the Coal Valley News in Boone County, and the Independent Herald in Wyoming County.

=== Public Sector ===
Along with his career in the private sector, Reynolds has used his Juris Doctor to serve as both a public defender and an Assistant District Attorney in Huntington. Reynolds won election to the West Virginia House of Delegates in 2006 and served as a Delegate for West Virginia House District 17 until 2016, when he decided not to run for reelection at the end of his term. Reynolds instead announced his candidacy for the West Virginia Attorney General position that was currently held by Republican Patrick Morrisey. Reynolds particularly took issue with Morrisey's close ties with the pharmaceutical industry given West Virginia's struggle with opioids. The race was notable in the amount of outside spending on behalf of Morrisey by the Republican Attorneys General Association. In the end, the outside funding was too much Reynolds to overcome, losing the race 42% - 52%.

== Elections ==
- 2012 Redistricted to District 17 along with fellow District 16 Delegate Dale Stephens, Reynolds placed second in the three-way May 8, 2012, Democratic Primary with 2,210 votes (41.8%), and placed first in the four-way two-position November 6, 2012, General election with 7,198 votes (32.9%) ahead of Delegate Stephens (D) and Republican nominees Michael Ankrom and Joyce Holland.
- 2004 Reynolds ran in the six-way 2004 Democratic Primary but did not place; incumbents Greg Howard (R) and Kelli Sobonya (R) were both re-elected along with former Delegate Dale Stephens (D) in the six-way three-position November 2, 2004, General election.
- 2006 Reynolds placed in the four-way 2006 Democratic Primary and was elected in the six-way three-position November 7, 2006, General election along with incumbent Delegates Sobonya (R) and Stephens (D), unseating Delegate Howard (R).
- 2008 Reynolds placed first in the five-way May 13, 2008, Democratic Primary with 5,573 votes (25.4%), and placed first in the four-way three-position November 4, 2008, General election with 12,462 votes (27.4%) ahead of Delegates Sobonya (R) and Stephens (D) and Democratic nominee Amy Herrenkohl.
- 2010 Reynolds and Delegate Stephens were unopposed for the May 11, 2010, Democratic Primary where Reynolds second with 2,941 votes (47.2%); Reynolds placed second in the four-way three-position November 2, 2010, General election with 8,900 votes (26.4%) behind Delegate Sobonya (R) and ahead of Delegate Stephens (D) and Republican nominee Tomma Anne See.

Party political offices
Preceded by Darrell McGraw	Democratic nominee for West Virginia Attorney General; 2016	Succeeded by Sam Petsonk
