= Fairborn Daily Herald =

- Type: Daily newspaper
- Format: Broadsheet
- Owner: HD Media
- Publisher: Barb Vandeventer
- Founded: 1951
- Headquarters: 1836 West Park Square, Xenia, Ohio 45385, United States
- OCLC number: 17358734
- Website: fairborndailyherald.com

The Fairborn Daily Herald is an American daily newspaper serving the city of Fairborn, Ohio, and adjoining communities such as Enon, Yellow Springs and Wright-Patterson Air Force Base. Most of its circulation is in Greene County.

It publishes Tuesdays through Saturdays from the Xenia offices of its sister paper, the Xenia Daily Gazette. Both the Daily Herald and the Daily Gazette, along with several nearby weekly newspapers in the Dayton metropolitan area, are owned by HD Media.

== History ==
The Fairborn Daily Herald has published daily since 1951. Previously it published as a weekly newspaper, also called the Herald, covering the villages of Fairfield and Osborn, Ohio, which merged in 1950 to become Fairborn.

In the 1980s and 1990s, the Fairborn Daily Herald and its sister publication, the Beavercreek Daily News (both owned by the Times company, publisher of the Kettering-Oakwood Times) shared a news room and were published from headquarters in northern Fairborn. In the 1990s, the Beavercreek Daily News was merged with its local rival, the Beavercreek Daily Current to form the 'Beavercreek News-Current', and moved to the Current's newsroom near the intersection of Dayton-Xenia Road and North Fairfield Road in Beavercreek, Ohio.

More recently, the Fairborn and Xenia papers, along with the daily (now weekly) Beavercreek News-Current, constituted the Greene County Dailies subsidiary of Brown Publishing Company. Brown purchased the Greene County papers from The Thomson Corporation, a Canadian publisher, in 1998.

Brown, a Cincinnati-based family business, declared bankruptcy and was reconstituted as Ohio Community Media in 2010. The company, including the Fairborn Daily Herald, was purchased for an undisclosed sum in 2011 by Philadelphia-based Versa Capital Management.

In 2012 Versa merged Ohio Community Media, the former Freedom papers it had acquired, Impressions Media, and Heartland Publications into a new company, Civitas Media. In 2017, Civitas Media sold its Ohio papers to AIM Media Midwest, an affiliate of AIM Media Texas. In August 2026, the paper was sold to HD Media.
