= Greene County Public Library =

The Greene County Public Library serves the communities of Greene County, Ohio (located east of Dayton, Ohio). The library system's administrative offices are in Xenia, and other branches are located in Beavercreek, Cedarville, Fairborn, Jamestown, Bellbrook, and Yellow Springs. Greene County Library is a member of the Miami Valley Libraries, one of eleven regional library cooperatives in Ohio.

In 2007, the library loaned more than 2.5 million items to its over 90,000 cardholders, making it the 10th busiest library in Ohio. Total holdings are over 607,000 volumes with more than 500 periodical subscriptions. As of 2007, the Greene County Public Library employs 58 full-time and 161 part-time staff.

The library system has a bookmobile, from which children have borrowed over 26,000 items. Other features of the library system include child care centers, story time, special programs for children and teens, and serving homebound patrons.

Greene County's Public Library System has been named one of the "Great American Public Library Systems" by HAPLR (Hennen's American Public Library Ratings). It has ranked in the top ten in the nation for libraries of its size and population served (100,000–250,000) in 2002 (6th), 2003 (9th), and 2004 (8th).

== Funding ==
Ohio's public libraries are funded through 2.22% of the state's total general tax revenue. The funding is projected to generate approximately $462 million for all Ohio's public libraries to share in calendar year 2008, and $465 million in 2009. The Greene County Public Library receives approximately 75% of its income from the State of Ohio.

The Greene County Public Library system also receives about 20% of its funding through a 1 mil property tax levy from Greene County residents. Remaining income is generated from fines, fees, and interest earned on investments.

== History ==
The first library in Greene County was founded in 1878 when the Young Women's Library Association (YWLA) was organized. They operated a small library in a room donated by Eli Millen, located on Greene Street in Xenia. Funding came from subscriptions from YWLA members. In 1881, the YWLA incorporated under the name Xenia Library Association. In 1885 they hired their first librarian, Clara Martin, for $6.25 per month.

A Carnegie library, the Greene County District Library, opened in 1906. Due to property destruction by a 1974 tornado in Xenia, land adjacent to the Xenia City Building was available. A new library was built there and opened in March 1978. The Greene County Room, housing local history and genealogy material, was established in 1971. From its corner in the Carnegie Building, it later relocated to the second floor of the new Xenia library in 1978.

In the 1990s the library system's name was legally changed to the Greene County Public Library.

The library in Xenia is one out of seven in the Greene County Public Library system:

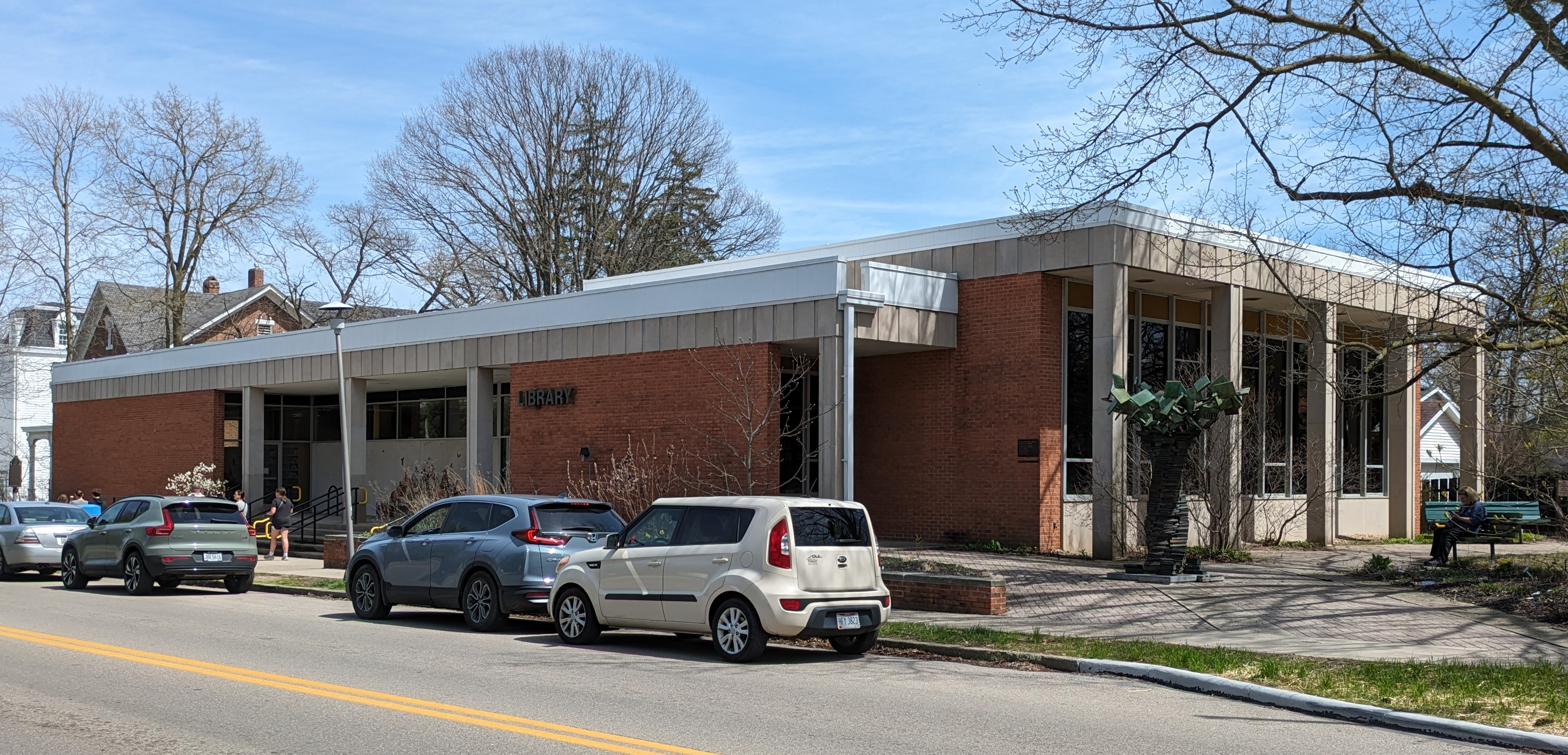
Yellow Springs Community Library

Yellow Springs
The Social Culture Club, which became the Yellow Springs Library Association, started a library in 1899 in Yellow Springs. A rented room was used for the library until 1935 when a permanent library was built with government labor, donated limestone, and was supported through a bond issue. The Yellow Springs library became part of the Greene County District Library system in 1926. In 1965, further expansion required a new building which was completed and named the John F. Kennedy Library. The funds for this building were raised within the community, with the strong support of the Yellow Springs Jaycees and other civic groups. The formal dedication of the new building took place on July 23, 1966. The Yellow Springs Library Association continues to actively support the library via monthly community meetings and establishment of various activities and programs such as the lending art collections, the borrowing of toys, and the financing of special projects.

Bellbrook
John Turnbull, M.D., physician and surgeon, started the Bellbrook library in his home in 1881. After his death, the Winters family donated a bank building they had purchased to the community for a library in 1906. The Bellbrook library became a part of the Greene County District Library system in 1945. Several additions have been added to the former bank building to support the growing library.

Jamestown
The first Jamestown Library was located in the high school, with an agreement between the Greene County District Library Board and the Board of Education. That library opened on October 16, 1928. In 1937, the library moved to a room in Town Hall. A major supporter was John S. Thomas, who donated many books from his personal library, bookcases, and a bequest of $1,000. Over time, the library outgrew this space and a new library building was built in 1998.

Fairborn
Originally called the Osborn Library or the Bath Township Library, the library now located in Fairborn opened on April 13, 1929, with 500 books and some magazines in a local barber shop; the barber also served as the librarian. The library then began a growth spurt that required moves to several locations, including, empty storage space at the local printing shop, and two years later to the Ford agency. Finally, in November, 1936 the library was moved to the building owned by Morris Funeral Home. In 1947, the library moved to the YMCA Building, which was completely destroyed by fire just two months later. After the fire, a basement room at St. Mark's Lutheran Church was used as new, temporary quarters (which lasted three years), and then the library moved to 15½ E. Main St., a small room upstairs over a bar. Two years after the merging of Osborn and Fairfield to form Fairborn (1950), a bond issue of $75,000 was approved by the voters in 1952 to provide a building for the library. That building was dedicated September 12, 1954. By the end of the 1970s, the library building was overcrowded; the adjacent First Church of Christ agreed to buy the library building, and the City of Fairborn purchased the old post office building to house the library. The newest Fairborn Library building was opened on December 2, 1979. Further expansion of this building, supported by the voters in 1989, was completed in 1990.

Cedarville
The Cedarville Library had been jointly managed by the Cedarville Township trustees and Cedarville College. It was housed in the Carnegie Building. In 1937, the Greene County District Library assumed management of the library, with help from the County Budget Commission and the State Library of Ohio. After a change in the Cedarville College charter in 1958, the public and college library collections were separated, and the public library books were shelved on the first floor. In September 1959 the public library moved to a small basement room in the Carnegie Building, and in 1960, new quarters were found in the old opera house in space formerly occupied by the post office. The area for the library was renovated by the Township Trustees, the Citizen's Library Committee, and the Lions Club of Cedarville. This facility was opened to the public in October 1961. In 2001, after a major fundraising drive led by Cedarville College Associate Director of Library Services Jan Bosma, a new library building was opened to the public.

Beavercreek
Beavercreek saw its share of bookmobile stops and book stations in the early 1950s. A newly formed Beavercreek Friends of the Library, together with a Beavercreek Library Committee worked with the Greene County District Library, and on July 1, 1959, the Beavercreek Library opened in rented quarters at 7109 Dayton Xenia Rd., with approximately 5,000 volumes. Gifts in memory of eight Girl Scouts and their two leaders were used to buy one section of a new charge desk and a new card catalog. The first librarian was Mrs. Beatrice Gordon, assisted by Mrs. Mary Nussbaum, Mrs. Bertha Lacers and Mrs. Barbara Whiter. In 1974, the Beavercreek Library was offered land by Mrs. Fay M. Bartley. In 1977, plans for a completely new structure on Mrs. Bartley's donated land were approved, and the dedication of the new building was held October 28, 1979. The library has continued to receive support from civic organizations, including the Beavercreek Women's League and the Friends of the Beavercreek Library.
