= Holiday Valley, Ohio =

- Census-designated place
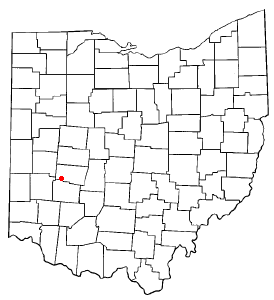
- Location of Holiday Valley, Ohio
- Coordinates: 39°51′13″N 83°57′43″W
- Country: United States
- State: Ohio
- County: Clark
- Township: Mad River

Area
  - Total: 1.82 sq mi (4.71 km^{2})
  - Land: 1.82 sq mi (4.71 km^{2})
  - Water: 0 sq mi (0.00 km^{2})
- Elevation: 984 ft (300 m)

Population (2020)
  - Total: 1,480
  - Density: 813.2/sq mi (313.96/km^{2})
- Time zone: UTC-5 (Eastern (EST))
  - Summer (DST): UTC-4 (EDT)
- FIPS code: 39-35868
- GNIS feature ID: 2393052

Holiday Valley is a census-designated place (CDP) in Mad River Township, Clark County, Ohio, United States. The population was 1,480 at the 2020 census. It is part of the Springfield, Ohio Metropolitan Statistical Area. Holiday Valley became a CDP in the 1990 United States census.

== Geography ==
Holiday Valley is located in southwestern Clark County in the southwest part of Mad River Township. It is bordered on the northeast by unincorporated Green Meadows and a small portion of the village of Enon, and on the south by Bath Township in Greene County. Dayton Springfield Road forms the northwestern edge of the CDP, leading southwest 15 miles (24 km) to downtown Dayton and northeast 10 miles (16 km) to the center of Springfield.

According to the United States Census Bureau, the CDP has a total area of 1.8 square miles (4.7 km^{2}), all of it land.

== Demographics ==
Historical population
Census	Pop.	Note	%±
1990	1,243		—
2000	1,712		37.7%
2010	1,510		−11.8%
2020	1,480		−2.0%
U.S. Decennial Census

As of the census of 2000, there were 1,712 people, 562 households, and 458 families residing in the CDP. The population density was 825.4 inhabitants per square mile (318.7/km^{2}). There were 588 housing units at an average density of 283.5 per square mile (109.5/km^{2}). The racial makeup of the CDP was 95.68% White, 1.46% African American, 0.12% Native American, 0.82% Asian, 0.06% Pacific Islander, 0.58% from other races, and 1.29% from two or more races. Hispanic or Latino of any race were 1.40% of the population.

There were 562 households, out of which 34.0% had children under the age of 18 living with them, 70.1% were married couples living together, 10.0% had a female householder with no husband present, and 18.5% were non-families. 16.5% of all households were made up of individuals, and 5.7% had someone living alone who was 65 years of age or older. The average household size was 2.65 and the average family size was 2.96.

In the CDP the population was spread out, with 22.5% under the age of 18, 4.4% from 18 to 24, 25.5% from 25 to 44, 26.5% from 45 to 64, and 21.1% who were 65 years of age or older. The median age was 43 years. For every 100 females there were 88.3 males. For every 100 females age 18 and over, there were 81.8 males.

The median income for a household in the CDP was $58,281, and the median income for a family was $63,464. Males had a median income of $46,923 versus $30,000 for females. The per capita income for the CDP was $21,601. About 2.6% of families and 12.2% of the population were below the poverty line, including 8.3% of those under age 18 and 32.3% of those age 65 or over.

== Education ==
The school district is Greenon Local School District.
