= Portsmouth Daily Times =

Newspaper published in Portsmouth, Ohio

The Portsmouth Daily Times
- Portsmouth Daily Times newspaper e-Edition on May 02, 2026
- Type: twice-weekly newspaper
- Owner: HD Media
- Managing editor: Richie Ray
- Staff writers: Joseph Pratt, Landen Puckett
- Founded: 1852
- Political alignment: Moderate
- Language: English
- Headquarters: 1103 11th Street, Portsmouth, Ohio, United States
- Circulation: Wednesday, Saturday
- ISSN: 8750-6963
- Website: Official website

Portsmouth Daily Times is a morning newspaper in Scioto County, Ohio with a print circulation of about 11,000. It was first printed in 1852 and printed Monday through Saturday, except Christmas Day. The newspaper is a member of the Associated Press, serving five Ohio counties (Scioto, Adams, Jackson, Lawrence, Pike) and two Kentucky counties (Greenup, Lewis).

== History ==
On April 10, 2010, the Portsmouth Daily Times printed its final paper on site, laying off its production staff. All editions henceforth will be printed by fellow Heartland paper the Gallipolis Daily Tribune.

In 2012, Versa merged Ohio Community Media, former Freedom papers it had acquired, Impressions Media, and Heartland Publications into a new company, Civitas Media. Civitas Media sold its Ohio papers to AIM Media Midwest in 2017.

On July 5, 2024, West Virginia based HD Media, the parent company of The Herald Dispatch and Charleston Gazette-Mail, had acquired the Portsmouth Daily Times from AIM Media Midwest, an affiliate of AIM Media Texas. Following the purchase, the newspaper changed its daily publishing schedule to twice a week i.e. Wednesdays and Saturdays.

== Editors ==
- 1986: Kevin Coffey
- 1991: Gary Abernathy
- Unknown – 2001: Debbie Allard
- 2001 – unknown: Ty Johnston
- Unknown – 2006: Don Willis
- Unknown: Rick Greene
- 2006: Kelly May (interim)
- 2007 – unknown: Art Kuhn
- Unknown: Jason Lovins
- Unknown: Deborah Daniels
- Unknown – June 2012: Josh Richardson
- June 2012 – December 2012: Ryan Ottney (interim)
- January 2013 – December 2013: Bob Strickley
- December 2013 – October 2015: Ryan Ottney
- October 2015 – December 2015: Wayne Allen (interim)
- January 2016 – November 2016: Fred Pace
- December 2016 – 2017: Chris Slone
- November 2019 – End Date Unknown: Adam Black
- Current - Richie Ray
