= Allentown, Clark County, Ohio =

Ghost town in Ohio

Coordinates: 39°49′55.2″N 83°51′37.3″W

Allentown is a ghost town in Clark County, in the U.S. state of Ohio. It was located within Green Township, but the precise location is unknown to the GNIS.

== History ==
Allentown had its start in the mid-1830s when Aaron Allen built a sawmill there.
