= Logan Banner =

Newspaper in Logan, West Virginia

The Logan Banner
- Type: Daily newspaper
- Owner(s): HD Media Co., LLC
- Founder: Henry Clay Ragland
- Founded: 1889; 136 years ago
- Language: English
- City: Logan, West Virginia
- Country: United States
- Circulation: 3,592 (as of 2016)
- Website: loganbanner.com

The Logan Banner, originally named the Logan County Banner, is a newspaper in Logan, West Virginia owned by HD Media, LLC, parent company of The Herald-Dispatch in Huntington. Circulation is limited to Logan County and surrounding areas.

The newspaper was founded in 1889, by Henry Clay Ragland, a veteran of the Confederate army, as a weekly paper. Over the years, it has had different publication schedules. In 1935, it became a Monday-Friday afternoon paper. In 1981 it adopted an unusual schedule of publishing Tuesday-Friday afternoons and Sunday mornings. In September 2018, under the ownership of HD Media, the paper was reduced to a tri-weekly schedule of publishing Sunday, Wednesday and Friday mornings. In July 2019, the publication schedule was once again reduced to a weekly. HD Media also adopted the same weekly schedule for the Banner's sister paper, the Williamson Daily News.

It was previously owned by Heartland Publications. In 2012 Versa Capital Management merged Heartland Publications, Ohio Community Media, the former Freedom papers it had acquired, and Impressions Media into a new company, Civitas Media. In 2017, Civitas sold its West Virginia properties to HD Media.

== Popular references ==
The Logan Banner appeared in several scenes of the 2012 hit TV miniseries titled Hatfields & McCoys starring Kevin Costner. The newspaper was known as the Logan County Banner at the time of the Hatfield-McCoy Feud, yet the TV program showed it incorrectly as the Logan Banner.
