= Xenia Daily Gazette =

American newspaper

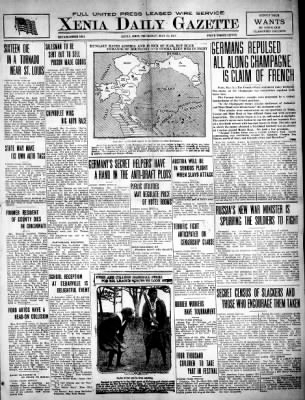
- Xenia Daily Gazette, May 31, 1917
- Type: Daily newspaper
- Format: Broadsheet
- Owner: HD Media
- Publisher: Lane Moon
- Founded: August 18, 1868, as Xenia Gazette
- Headquarters: 1836 West Park Square, Xenia, Ohio 45385, United States
- ISSN: 8750-4650
- Website: xeniagazette.com

The Xenia Daily Gazette is a Pulitzer Prize-winning American daily newspaper published twice per week in Xenia, Ohio and its surrounding area. It covers the city of Xenia and several nearby communities in Greene County, including Bellbrook, Cedarville, Clifton, Jamestown and Wilberforce.

== History ==
The first edition of the Gazette was a weekly newspaper begun in Xenia in 1868. It converted to daily publication as the Xenia Daily Gazette in November 1881.

In 1975, the staff of the Xenia Daily Gazette won the Pulitzer Prize for Spot News Reporting, in recognition of their coverage of the F5 tornado that decimated Xenia during the 1974 Super Outbreak, killing 34 residents and heavily damaging or destroying about half the buildings in the city.

More recently, the Xenia Daily Gazette was the flagship newspaper of the Greene County Dailies division of Brown Publishing Company, which also included the Fairborn Daily Herald and the daily (now weekly) Beavercreek News-Current. Brown purchased the Greene County papers from The Thomson Corporation, a Canadian publisher, in 1998.

Brown, a Cincinnati-based family business, declared bankruptcy and was reconstituted as Ohio Community Media in 2010. The company, including the Xenia Daily Gazette, was purchased for an undisclosed sum in 2011 by Philadelphia-based Versa Capital Management.

In March 2019, delivery of the print Beavercreek News-Current ceased and it became a free publication to be picked up at local businesses.

Printed editions of the Gazette and Daily Herald were reduced from five to two days per week in February 2023, while daily versions are still produced on the newspaper websites.

In August 2026, AIM Media Midwest sold the paper to HD Media.
