= Green Meadows, Ohio =

Place in Ohio, United States

- Census-designated place
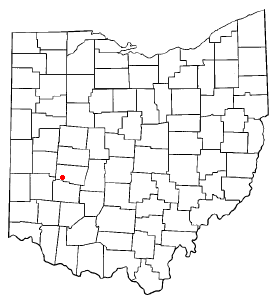
- Location of Green Meadows, Ohio
- Coordinates: 39°52′15″N 83°56′38″W
- Country: United States
- State: Ohio
- County: Clark
- Township: Mad River

Area
  - Total: 0.80 sq mi (2.06 km^{2})
  - Land: 0.80 sq mi (2.06 km^{2})
  - Water: 0 sq mi (0.00 km^{2})
- Elevation: 906 ft (276 m)

Population (2020)
  - Total: 2,373
  - Density: 2,984.8/sq mi (1,152.44/km^{2})
- Time zone: UTC-5 (Eastern (EST))
  - Summer (DST): UTC-4 (EDT)
- FIPS code: 39-32207
- GNIS feature ID: 2393028

Green Meadows is a census-designated place (CDP) in Mad River Township, Clark County, Ohio, United States, on the west side of Enon. The population was 2,373 at the 2020 census. It is part of the Springfield, Ohio Metropolitan Statistical Area.

== Geography ==
Green Meadows is located in southwestern Clark County, near the center of Mad River Township. It is bordered on the east by the village of Enon and on the southwest by unincorporated Holiday Valley. Dayton Springfield Road forms the northwestern edge of the community, leading northeast through the center of Enon 8 miles (13 km) to the center of Springfield. Dayton is 17 miles (27 km) to the southwest.

According to the United States Census Bureau, the Green Meadows CDP has a total area of 0.81 square miles (2.1 km^{2}), all of it land.

== Demographics ==
Historical population
Census	Pop.	Note	%±
2020	2,373		—
U.S. Decennial Census

As of the census of 2000, there were 2,318 people, 917 households, and 674 families residing in the CDP. The population density was 3,807.8 inhabitants per square mile (1,470.2/km^{2}). There were 943 housing units at an average density of 1,549.1 per square mile (598.1/km^{2}). The racial makeup of the CDP was 97.33% White, 0.86% African American, 0.04% Native American, 0.69% Asian, 0.17% from other races, and 0.91% from two or more races. Hispanic or Latino of any race were 0.91% of the population.

There were 917 households, out of which 33.7% had children under the age of 18 living with them, 59.7% were married couples living together, 10.7% had a female householder with no husband present, and 26.4% were non-families. 22.1% of all households were made up of individuals, and 7.0% had someone living alone who was 65 years of age or older. The average household size was 2.53 and the average family size was 2.98.

In the CDP the population was spread out, with 25.1% under the age of 18, 8.5% from 18 to 24, 31.2% from 25 to 44, 24.8% from 45 to 64, and 10.4% who were 65 years of age or older. The median age was 35 years. For every 100 females there were 95.6 males. For every 100 females age 18 and over, there were 94.6 males.

The median income for a household in the CDP was $41,071, and the median income for a family was $48,500. Males had a median income of $37,383 versus $27,188 for females. The per capita income for the CDP was $18,699. About 2.6% of families and 4.5% of the population were below the poverty line, including 6.1% of those under age 18 and 2.1% of those age 65 or over.

== Education ==
The school district is Greenon Local School District.
