= Roger Osborne (disambiguation) =

Roger Osborne (born 1950) is a British footballer.

Roger Osborne may also refer to:

- Roger Osborne (writer) (1936–2007), American writer
- Buzz Osborne (Roger Osborne, born 1964), American guitarist, vocalist and songwriter, member of Melvins
