= Byron, Ohio =

Unincorporated community in Ohio, U.S.

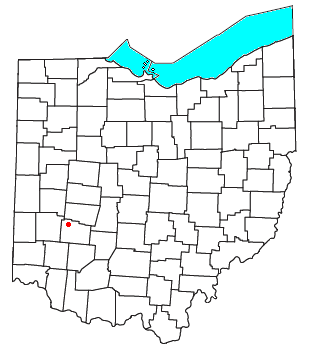
Location of Byron, Ohio

Byron is a small unincorporated community in southeastern Bath Township, Greene County, Ohio, United States. It sits at the intersection of Linebaugh and Dayton-Yellow Springs Roads, between Fairborn and Xenia. Byron is located at 39°47′10″N 83°58′51″W (39.7861705, -83.9807661), at an elevation of 915 feet (279 m).

The community is part of the Dayton Metropolitan Statistical Area.

== History ==
Byron was originally called Tylersville, after President John Tyler, and under the latter name was platted in 1841 on the road running between Yellow Springs and Dayton. The present name honors Lord Byron, an English poet. A post office called Byron was established in 1849, and remained in operation until 1902.
