= Fairborn Theatre =

- U.S. National Register of Historic Places
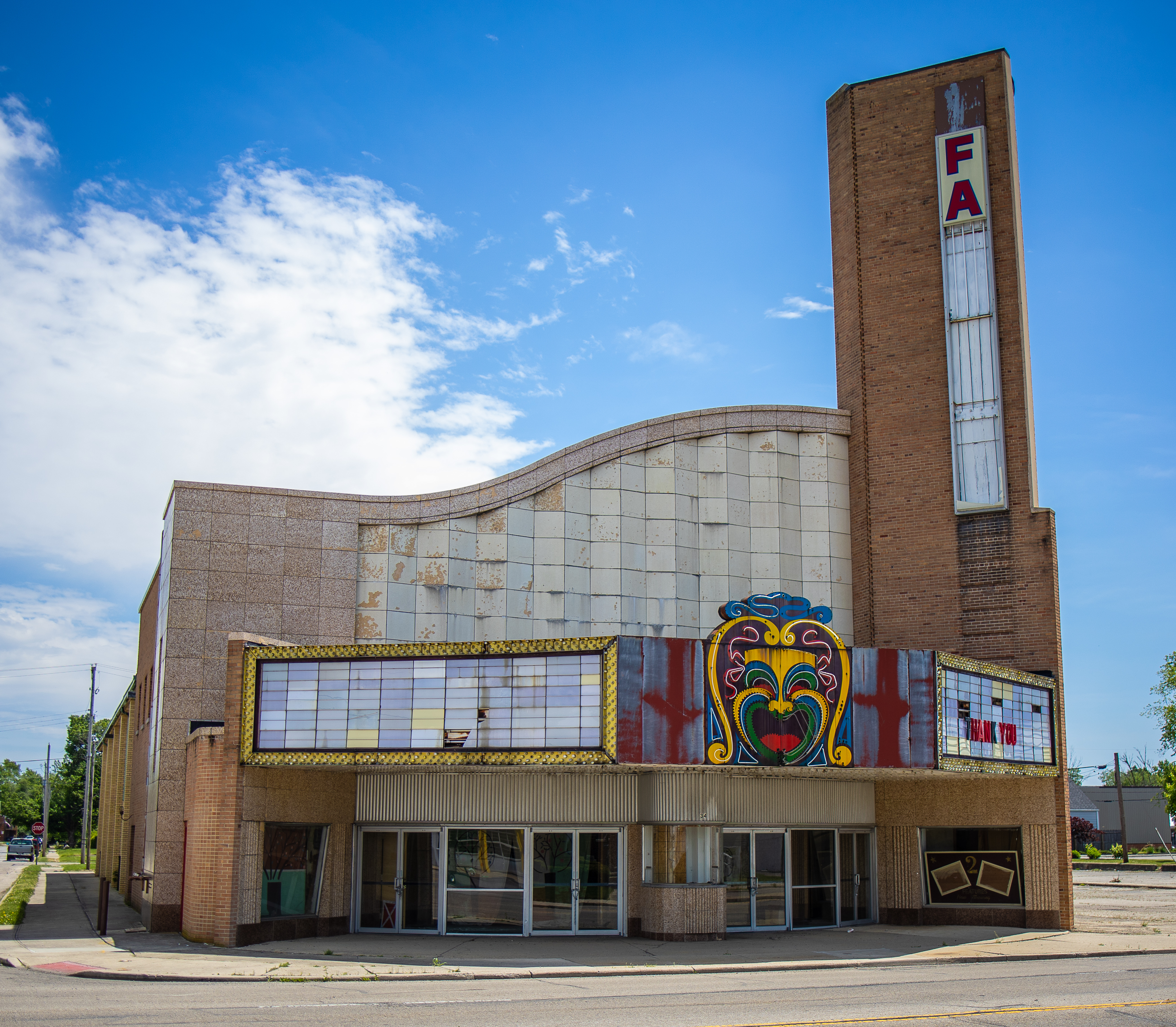
- Front and northern side

- Location within Ohio Location within the United States
- Location: 34 S. Broad St., Fairborn, Ohio
- Coordinates: 39°49′10″N 84°1′40″W
- Area: 1.1 acres (0.45 ha)
- Built: 1948
- Architect: Lloyd Zeller, Herman Hunter; C.W. Fry Construction Company
- Architectural style: Moderne
- NRHP reference No.: 05000755
- Added to NRHP: July 27, 2005

The Fairborn Theatre is a historic movie theater in the city of Fairborn, Ohio, United States. Built soon after World War II in an Air Force community, it has been named a historic site due to its aviation-themed architecture.

== Architecture ==
Architects Lloyd Zeller and Herman Hunter designed the theater, which is built of brick on a concrete foundation and covered with an asphalt roof. Built by the C.W. Fry Construction Company, it comprised a thousand-seat theater when it opened in 1948. Located near an Air Force facility, Wright-Patterson Air Force Base, the theater features period aviation-related elements such as an interior painting of soldiers and aircraft of World War II. As an example of Streamline Moderne architecture, the theater includes elements such as streamlining and metal detailing. Its location along State Route 444 makes it an example of Fairborn's automobile-related commercial development.

== Preservation ==
Chakeres Theatres operated the Fairborn Theatre from 1948 until the early 1970s, when it was temporarily closed to be remodelled into a two-screen operation. Following remodelling, the theater ran until January 2000, when Chakeres ceased operating it; the company retained ownership until 2002, when it donated the building to a Fairborn arts organization. Soon afterward, more than ten years of renovation began; carried on largely by volunteers with a small budget, renovations have included ridding the building of asbestos, roof maintenance, and removing the wall separating the two theater rooms to restore them to their original one-room format. Some of the estimated $5.5 million cost of restoring the theater was paid by the Ohio Department of Development, which in 2010 granted $48,000 American Recovery and Reinvestment Act money to the arts organization.

In 2005, the Fairborn Theatre was listed on the National Register of Historic Places, qualifying because of its historically significant architecture. It is one of three register-listed properties in Fairborn, along with the 1924 Bath Township Consolidated School and the 1799 Mercer Log House.
