= Bath Township, Greene County, Ohio =

Township in Ohio, US

- Township
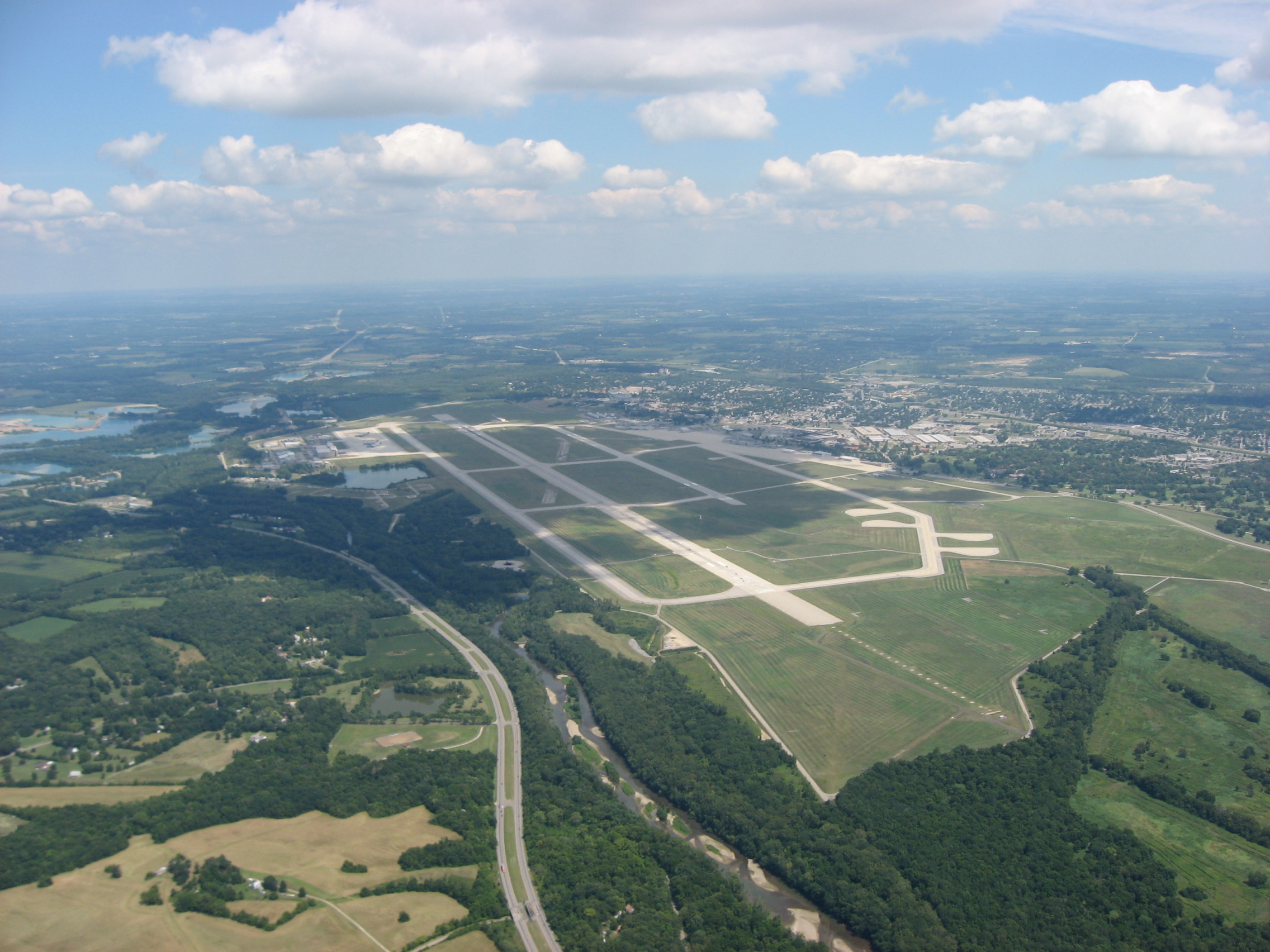
- Most of Wright-Patterson Air Force Base is located in Bath Township.

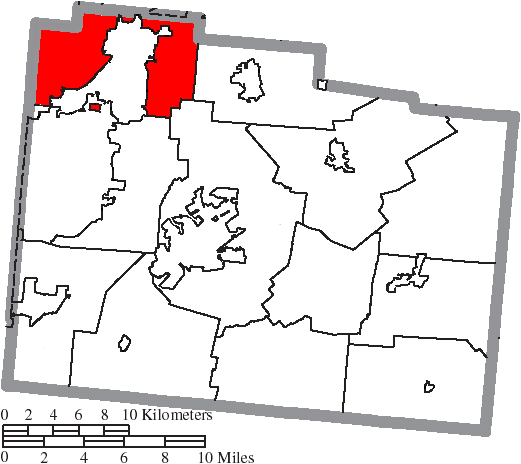
- Location of Bath Township in Greene County
- Coordinates: 39°48′34″N 84°1′23″W
- Country: United States
- State: Ohio
- County: Greene

Area
  - Total: 37.8 sq mi (98.0 km^{2})
  - Land: 37.5 sq mi (97.0 km^{2})
  - Water: 0.39 sq mi (1.0 km^{2})
- Elevation: 860 ft (262 m)

Population (2020)
  - Total: 39,365
  - Density: 1,050/sq mi (406/km^{2})
- Time zone: UTC-5 (Eastern (EST))
  - Summer (DST): UTC-4 (EDT)
- FIPS code: 39-04220
- GNIS feature ID: 1086163
- Website: www.bathtwp.us

Bath Township is one of the twelve townships of Greene County, Ohio, United States. As of the 2020 census, the township population was 39,365.

== Geography ==
Located in the northwestern corner of the county, it borders the following townships and cities:

- Bethel Township, Clark County – north
- Mad River Township, Clark County – northeast
- Miami Township – east
- Xenia Township – southeast
- Beavercreek Township – south
- Riverside – southwest
- Dayton – west
- Huber Heights – northwest

Several populated places are located in Bath Township:

- Part of the city of Beavercreek, in the southwest
- Most of the city of Fairborn, in the center, which includes the former village of Osborn
- Most of Wright-Patterson Air Force Base, a census-designated place, in the west
- Part of the city of Huber Heights in the west
- The unincorporated community of Byron, in the southeast

== Name and history ==
Bath Township was organized in 1807. The township was named after Bath, Maine (which was named after the English city of Bath). One of the early settlers came from the city in Maine. Statewide, other Bath Townships are located in Allen and Summit counties.

The first settlers in Bath Township were members of the Mercer family, who immigrated from Virginia. The precise date of their arrival is unknown, but it seems certain that crops were being raised in the township before George Washington died in 1799. The Mercer Log House still stands and is listed on the National Register of Historic Places.

== Government ==
The township is governed by a three-member board of trustees, who are elected in November of odd-numbered years to a four-year term beginning on the following January 1. Two are elected in the year after the presidential election and one is elected in the year before it. There is also an elected township fiscal officer, who serves a four-year term beginning on April 1 of the year after the election, which is held in November of the year before the presidential election. Vacancies in the fiscal officership or on the board of trustees are filled by the remaining trustees.

== Biodigester Controversy ==
In 2014, a 5.5 million gallon Dovetail Energy Biodigester, owned and operated by Renergy Incorporated, was built in Bath Township. It was built on a pig farm owned by then-Bath Township Trustee Thomas V. Pitstick. Residents of Bath Township and the City of Fairborn began to complain of odor in the areas around the digester, which continued to be the source of controversy.

The biodigester is to be shut down by 31 January 2024, by order of the Ohio Attorney General.

=== Zoning Appeals ===
Following years of complaints from Bath Township and Fairborn residents, the Bath Township Board of Zoning Appeals brought in an outside prosecutor to advise the township in 2019. On 6 September 2019, Renergy Inc., Dovetail Energy LLC, and Thomas Pitstick were sent a Notice of Violation from this prosecutor citing the operation was in violation of the Ohio Revised Code and Bath Township's zoning codes. The letter alleged that since more than half of the material feeding the biodigester came from outside of Pitstick's farm, that the operation was industrial in nature, as opposed to the agricultural zone it was operating on. They were given 30 days to correct the violation cited in the letter.

Dovetail Energy appealed the decision with the Bath Township Board of Zoning Appeals, which the board denied on 3 March 2020.

Following this, Dovetail Energy appealed the Board's decision to the Greene County Common Pleas Court. Dovetail Energy argued that since the energy production qualified as a public utility, that it was exempt from township zoning requirements. They further supported this argument by citing that the biodigester in operation was an Ohio Renewable Energy Resource Generating Facility and that they had paid Public Utility Personal Property Taxes to the State of Ohio and Greene County since 2015. The Court ruled in favor of Dovetail Energy on 29 April 2021 and the operation was allowed to continue. This mirrored a decision made in Morrow County, Ohio where another biodigester was in operation.

The Bath Township Board of Zoning Appeals then appealed Greene County's decision to the Ohio Second District Court of Appeals, which also ruled in favor of Dovetail Energy on 14 Jan 2022.

=== Legal Actions & Environmental Violations ===
The first lawsuit was brought against Dovetail Energy LLC & Renergy Inc. on 10 December 2020. It was a class action lawsuit filed by Luke Borntrager, a Bath Township resident who resided in the immediate vicinity of the biodigester. It alleged that Dovetail Energy had failed to "collect, capture, and destroy gas from the facility in a manner that does not allow noxious odors". It also alleged negligence on behalf of Dovetail Energy, Thomas Pitstick (who was still a sitting Bath Township Trustee), and Renergy Inc., despite repeated government and resident complaints.

Renergy Inc. motioned to dismiss the class-action in February 2021.

In April 2022, the City of Fairborn and Bath Township filed a federal lawsuit against Renergy Inc., Dovetail Energy LLC, the Ohio Environmental Protection Agency, and the United States Environmental Protection Agency in the United States District Court for the Southern District of Ohio. It alleged that Renergy and Dovetail Energy were knowingly in violation of the Clean Air Act by allowing the biodigeste storage tank to emit significant quantities of ammonia without applying for or obtaining an air pollution permit, or adopting any countermeasures to control the amount of emissions. They further emphasized this was also in violation of Ohio Air Pollution Control laws in the Ohio Revised Code. The Ohio and US EPAs were named as defendants for allegedly failing to enforce the Clean Air Act and Ohio Air Pollution Control laws on Renergy and Dovetail Energy.

This lawsuit was further supported by another lawsuit filed by the Ohio Attorney General Dave Yost against Renergy on 15 April 2022 for emissions of ammonia without a permit. The Attorney General's lawsuit detailed that the company initially only used agricultural waste to generate energy, but began accepting municipal and commercial waste by February 2018. It claimed, “the company failed to obtain the required permit for the digestate storage tank at the time it started introducing non-agricultural organic wastes into the process and thus became subject to regulation.” Renergy Inc and Dovetail Energy reached a settlement with the Ohio Attorney General in the Greene County Common Pleas Court later that month. They agreed to pay a civil penalty of $75,000, as well as establish deadlines for correction of the emissions. The lawsuit held a maximum fine of $35.6 million.

The US and Ohio EPAs stated that Fairborn and Bath Township's lawsuit "stepped beyond the scope of their offices" and that "the fact that plaintiffs might not be satisfied with the progress Ohio EPA and EPA made does not mean that they may seek an order from this court, forcing EPA to exercise its enforcement authority". They cited that diligent prosecution had met and the civil lawsuit held no grounds for something the agencies were already attempting to enforce.

In September 2022, Renergy Inc. was issued a Notice of Violation by the US EPA. It cited excess emissions of hydrogen sulfide from the biodigester's flare and engine in January 2019. It also alleged that from 21 June 2021 to 6 December 2021 that Renergy improperly operated the biodigester's facility engines, to include negligently shutting down the flare used to burn excess gasses.

On 20 September 2023, Ohio Attorney General Dave Yost issued an order to Renergy Incorporated to completely shutdown the biodigester by 31 January 2024. Renergy agreed to the following terms:

- Stop accepting feedstock and waste by Oct. 1, 2023.
- Empty the digestate storage tank by Dec. 15, 2023.
- Empty and clean the digester and other equipment by Jan. 15, 2024.
- Submit documentation of the emptying and cleaning by Jan. 30, 2024.
- Request termination of its permits and certify that the facility is permanently shut down by Jan. 31, 2024.

=== Political Controversy ===
Thomas V. Pitstick was a Bath Township Trustee from at least July 2008 to November 2021. The Dovetail Energy biodigester was built on his pig farm in 2014, when he held public office.

After the initial zoning disputes, citizens petitioned for Pitstick to resign his position on the Board of Trustees in December 2020, due to his involvement with the ongoing lawsuits and controversy surrounding the biodigester. The petition also called for Steve Ross, another Trustee, to resign for an unrelated matter. The petition stated, “we believe that Steve Ross and Tom Pitstick have continually failed to hold the best interest of the citizens of Bath Township and the City of Fairborn (which resides in Bath Township) as their primary focus, and have let their personal views and interests result in decisions that have both negatively and adversely affected citizens thereof.” Pitstick and Ross did not step down from their positions.

Shortly after, in March 2021, the Bath Township Board of Trustees voted to tighten rules for public comment at township meetings. The rules were introduced by Bath Township Administrator Pete Bales, in order to restrict comments on the township's ongoing litigation with Renergy Inc. and Dovetail Energy.

Bales stated, "We are involved in pending litigation and we should not be commenting on it...So whenever there’s a question about Dovetail or the Dovetail lawsuit, as much as people want to know what’s going on, it is pending in court. And we should not be commenting on it. We should let our attorneys do that work". Residents were upset about the changes, alleging the township was becoming less transparent with its constituents.

The rules passed in a 2-1 vote. Trustees Pitstick and Ross voted in favor of the restrictions, while Trustee Kassie Lester voted against it.

Pitstick would lose reelection in November 2021 against then-Fairborn Deputy City Mayor Rob Hoffman. Pitstick received 932 votes vs Hoffman's 2,544, Bath Township had 7,514 eligible voters that year.
