= Charleston Daily Mail =

Defunct newspaper in Charleston, West Virginia, United States

- Type: Daily newspaper
- Format: Broadsheet
- Founded: 1914
- Ceased publication: 2015

The Charleston Daily Mail was a newspaper based in Charleston, West Virginia. On July 20, 2015, it merged with the Charleston Gazette to form the Charleston Gazette-Mail.

== Publishing history ==
The Daily Mail was founded in 1914 by former Alaska Governor Walter Eli Clark and remained the property of his heirs until 1987. Governor Clark described the newspaper as an "independent Republican" publication. The newspaper published in the afternoons, Monday–Saturday, with a Sunday morning edition, until 1961, when the paper entered into a Joint Operating Agreement with the morning Charleston Gazette and the new Sunday Charleston Gazette-Mail was substituted and the Daily Mail began a six-day afternoon publishing schedule.

In 1987, the Clark heirs sold the paper to the Toronto-based Thomson Newspapers. The new owners moderated the political views of the paper to some degree. In 1998, Thomson sold the Daily Mail to the Denver-based MediaNews Group.

In May 2004, MediaNews sold the paper to the Daily Gazette Company, the owners of the morning newspaper. The new owner reduced the staff and canceled its Saturday edition, publishing Monday–Friday afternoons from 2004 to 2009. It also began to market the paper in an uncompetitive manner in an attempt to drive its circulation down to the point it could be closed. The United States Department of Justice filed suit under antitrust laws almost immediately. In the course of the lawsuit it was discovered that the Daily Gazette Company had presented a business plan to the United Bank which projected a shutdown of the paper no later than 2007.

In January 2009, the paper was switched to a morning publication.

On January 20, 2010, the Daily Gazette Company and the Justice Department settled relative to violations in the purchase of the Daily Mail and the Daily Gazette Company's management of it. Under the announced terms of the settlement, the previous owner, the Media News Group, held a perpetual option to re-purchase 20% of the paper, had two of five seats on the management board, and determined the size of the budget for its news staff and choose its editorial content. The Daily Gazette was required to seek government permission to cease publication of the Daily Mail and the intellectual property of the paper passed to the Media News Group when it shut down. This intellectual property once included the domain name dailymail.com which the newspaper beat the larger London paper in registering in 1996, but in January 2014 it was reported that the British company had paid over £1m (US$1.7m) for the domain name for its Mail Online service.

The newspaper was merged with the Charleston Gazette, without prior notice on July 20, 2015, to form the Charleston Gazette-Mail.

== Awards ==
The Daily Mail has won awards in many fields. J. D. Maurice, its editor of many years until his retirement in 1978, won the Sigma Delta Chi Award for editorial writing in 1958 and the Pulitzer Prize for distinguished editorial writing in 1975.
