= Mercer Log House =

- U.S. National Register of Historic Places
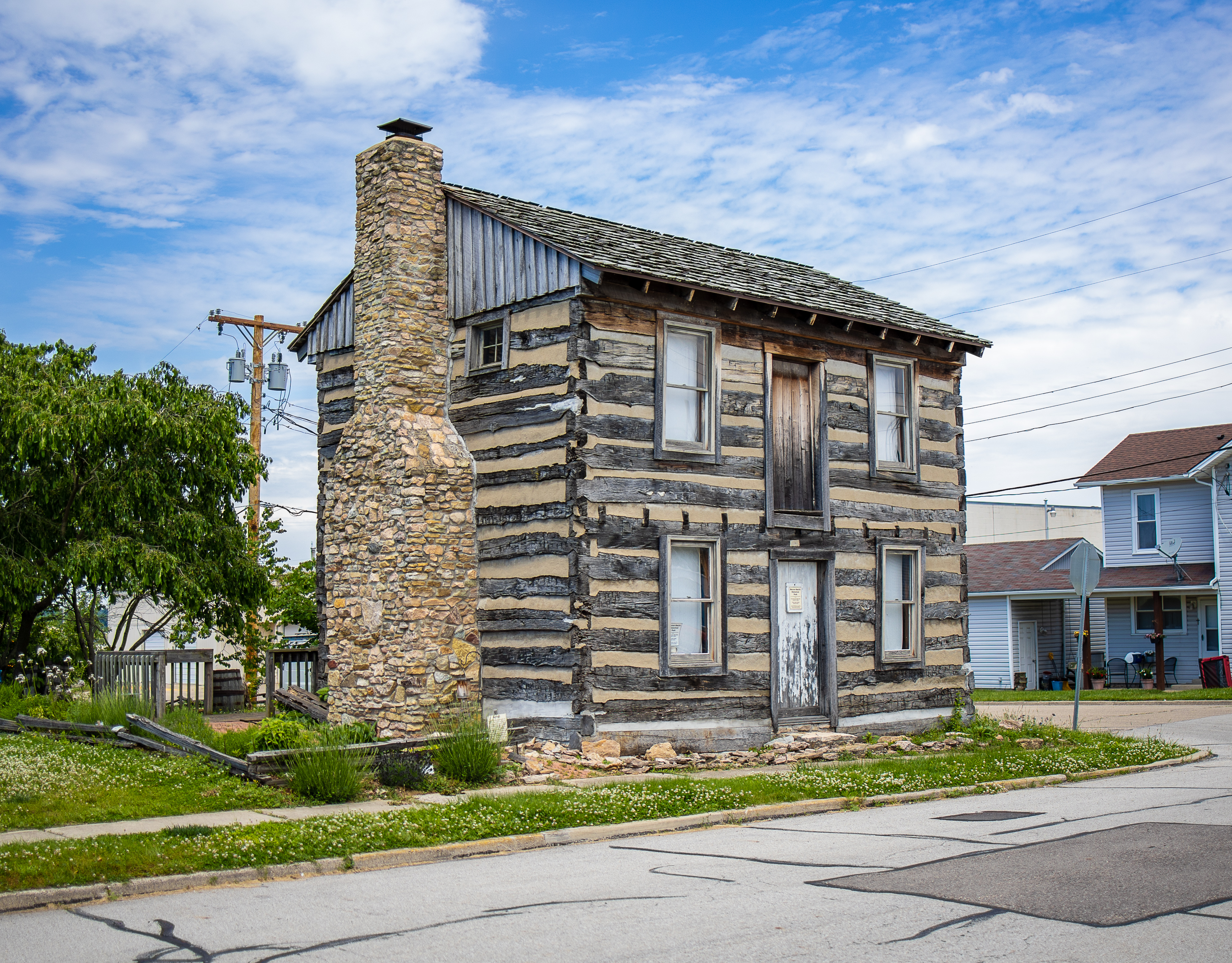
- Front and southern side

- Location within Ohio Location within the United States
- Location: 41 N. 1st St., Fairborn, Ohio
- Coordinates: 39°49′25″N 84°1′44″W
- Area: Less than 1 acre (0.40 ha)
- Built: 1799
- NRHP reference No.: 81000433
- Added to NRHP: October 16, 1981

The Mercer Log House is a large log cabin in the city of Fairborn, Ohio, United States. Home to the city's first settlers and changed very little since their time, it is one of Ohio's best preserved log cabins from the settlement period, and it has been named a historic site.

== Historic context ==
According to local tradition, part of present-day Fairborn was occupied by an Indian village until the 1790s, when they were driven from their village by a force of soldiers from Kentucky. The land did not remain unoccupied for long; Bath Township's first settlers had become well established by the time that Greene County was organized in 1803. By the end of the 1790s, a family from Virginia named Mercer had immigrated to the Northwest Territory and purchased a large tract of land at 25¢ per acre (approximately $61.78 per km²) that included the site of the Indian village. While the Mercers' precise date of arrival is unknown, it seems certain that crops were being raised in the township before George Washington's death in 1799. They were the first of several early families in the vicinity of modern Fairborn, which had at least five resident families by the time of the birth of the first white child in 1800. These early settlers were isolated from surrounding regions for the first twenty years after the Mercers arrived; except for the road running between the cities of Dayton and Springfield, the township's best transportation routes were paths through the dense forest, although the nearby Mad River could be used for light freight transportation during the spring floods. By the end of the 1810s, more settlers were moving into the area; Fairborn (then known as Fairfield) was platted in 1817, by which time the property was owned by Robert Mercer.

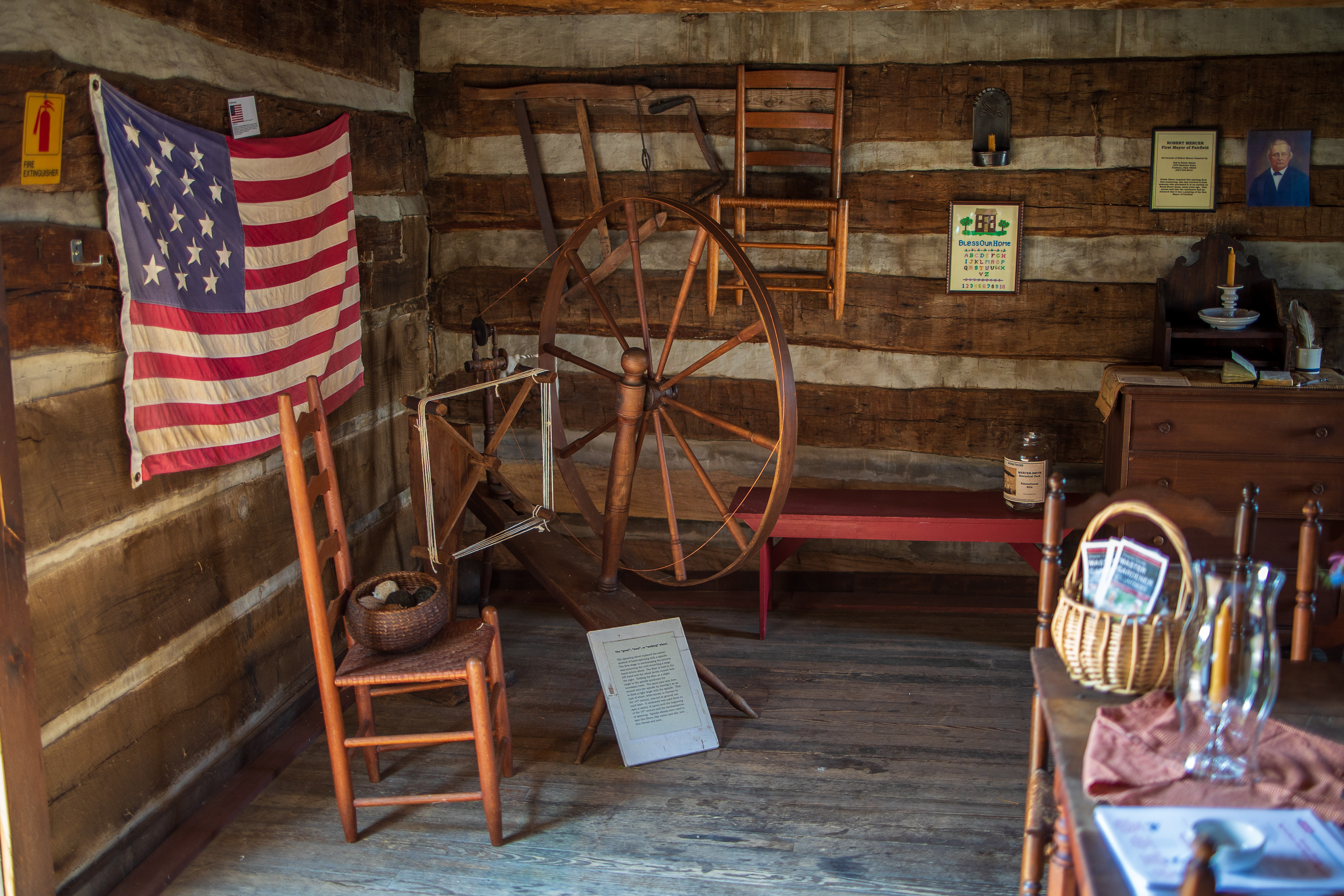

== Architecture ==
The Mercers constructed a log cabin on their property soon after arriving; while its precise date of construction is uncertain, the Mercer Log House is believed to have been built in 1799. Set on a stone foundation, the house is a typical example of the region's turn-of-the-century vernacular architecture, due to features such as its square appearance (produced by the nearly one-to-one ratio between its height, length, and width), the large opening for a fireplace, and the small size of the other openings in the structure. Today, it is distinguished from most surviving log cabins in Ohio by its unusual degree of preservation; in order to expand them into larger structures, most early log cabins in the state have had additional openings cut in their walls, but the Mercer cabin's log walls are virtually unchanged from their original form.

== Preservation ==
In 1981, the Mercer Log House was listed on the National Register of Historic Places because of its historically significant architecture. It is one of three Fairborn buildings listed on the National Register, along with the Fairborn Theatre of 1948 and the former Bath Township Consolidated School of 1924.

The house is owned by the city as part of the small Mercer-Smith Historical Park.

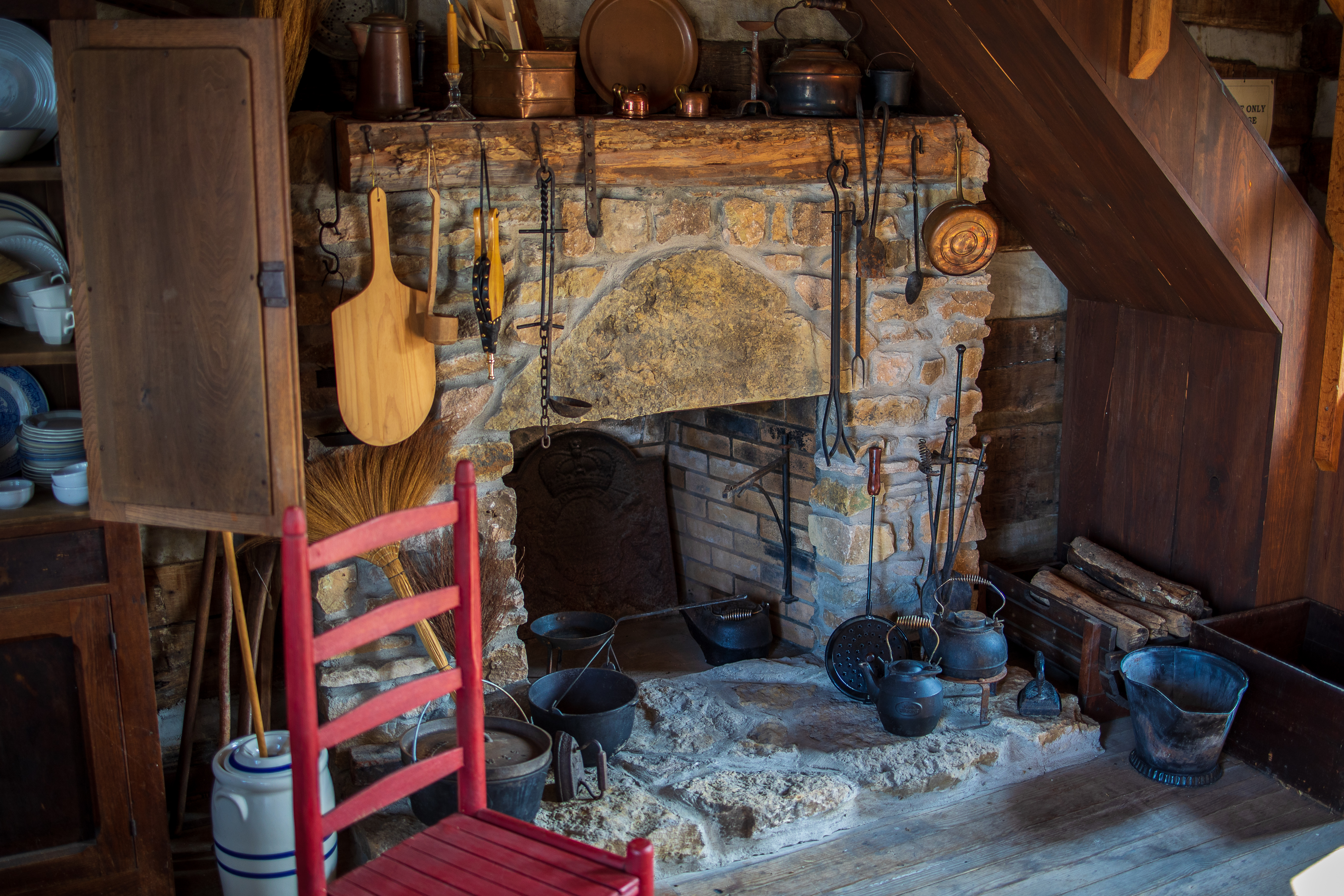
The fireplace hearth

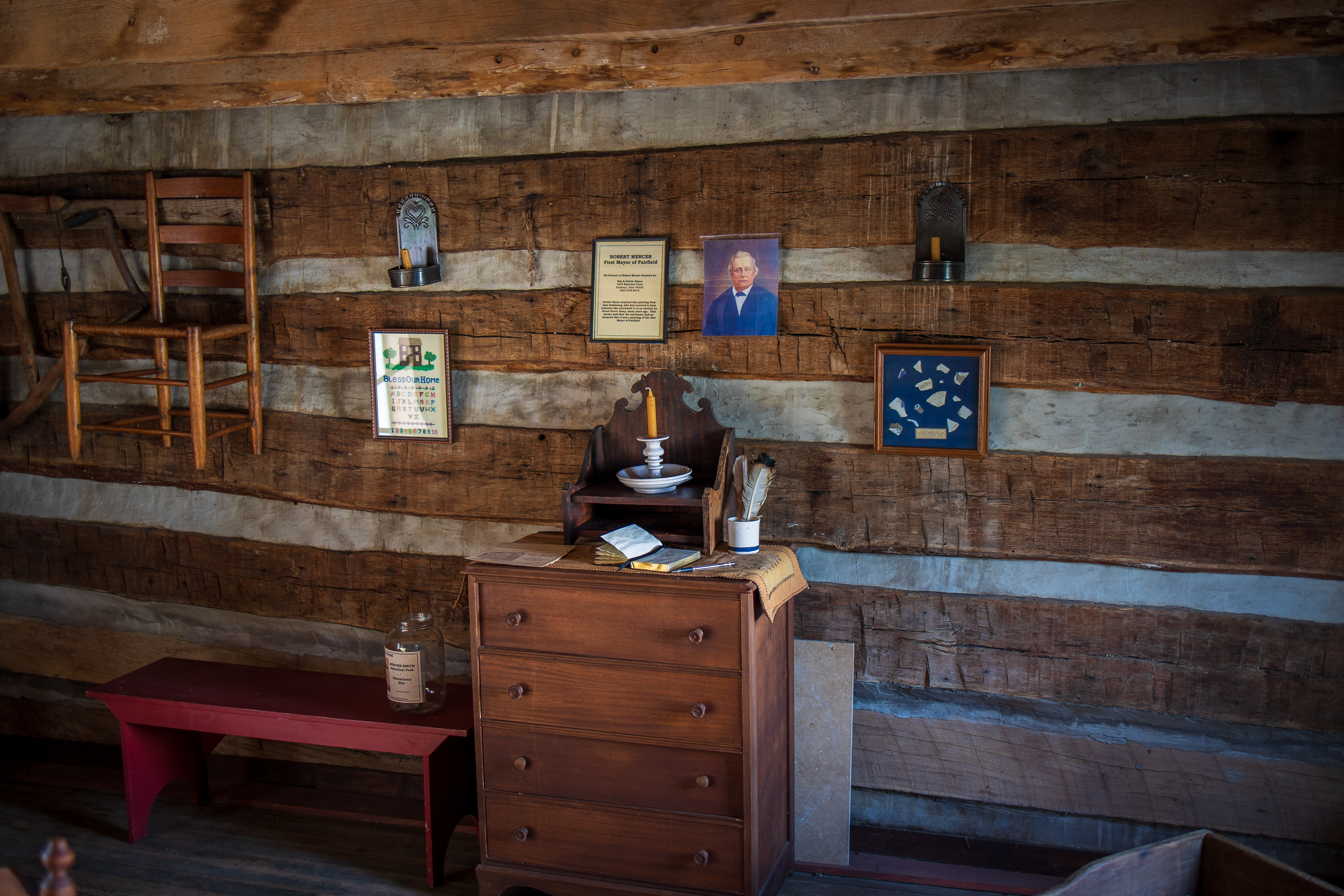
Inside the Mercer House

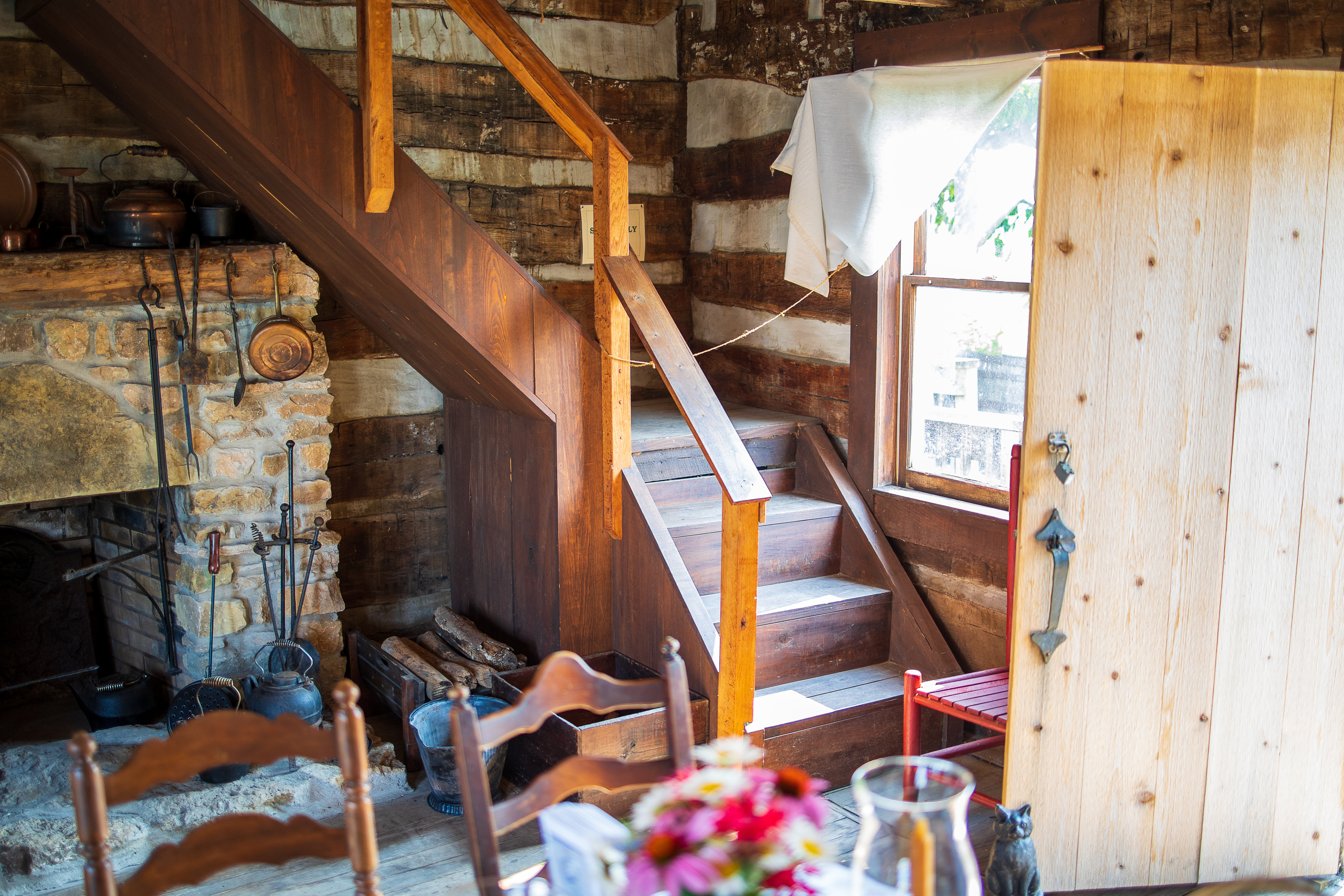
The stairs inside the Mercer House

== See also ==
- Log building
