= Greenon Local School District =

School district in Ohio

Greenon Local School District is a school district in Clark County, Ohio, United States. Formerly known as "Mad River-Green Local School District", the name reflected the cooperation between Mad River and Green Townships in not just education but also police, fire, and emergency services. The current name reflects the name of Green Township and the village of Enon, which is the "seat" of Mad River Township. The name was changed to distinguish this school district from Mad River Local Schools in Montgomery County, Ohio. The school district formerly operated Enon Elementary, Indian Valley Middle School, and Greenon High School. The district has since moved to a single K-12 building on the former site of the middle school. The main office is located in Enon, Ohio, at the former elementary school.

== Area ==
The district includes the municipality of Enon and the census-designated places of Green Meadows and Holiday Valley. The district includes the vast majority of Mad River Township and a section of Green Township.
