= Mad River Township, Clark County, Ohio =

Township in Ohio, US

- Township
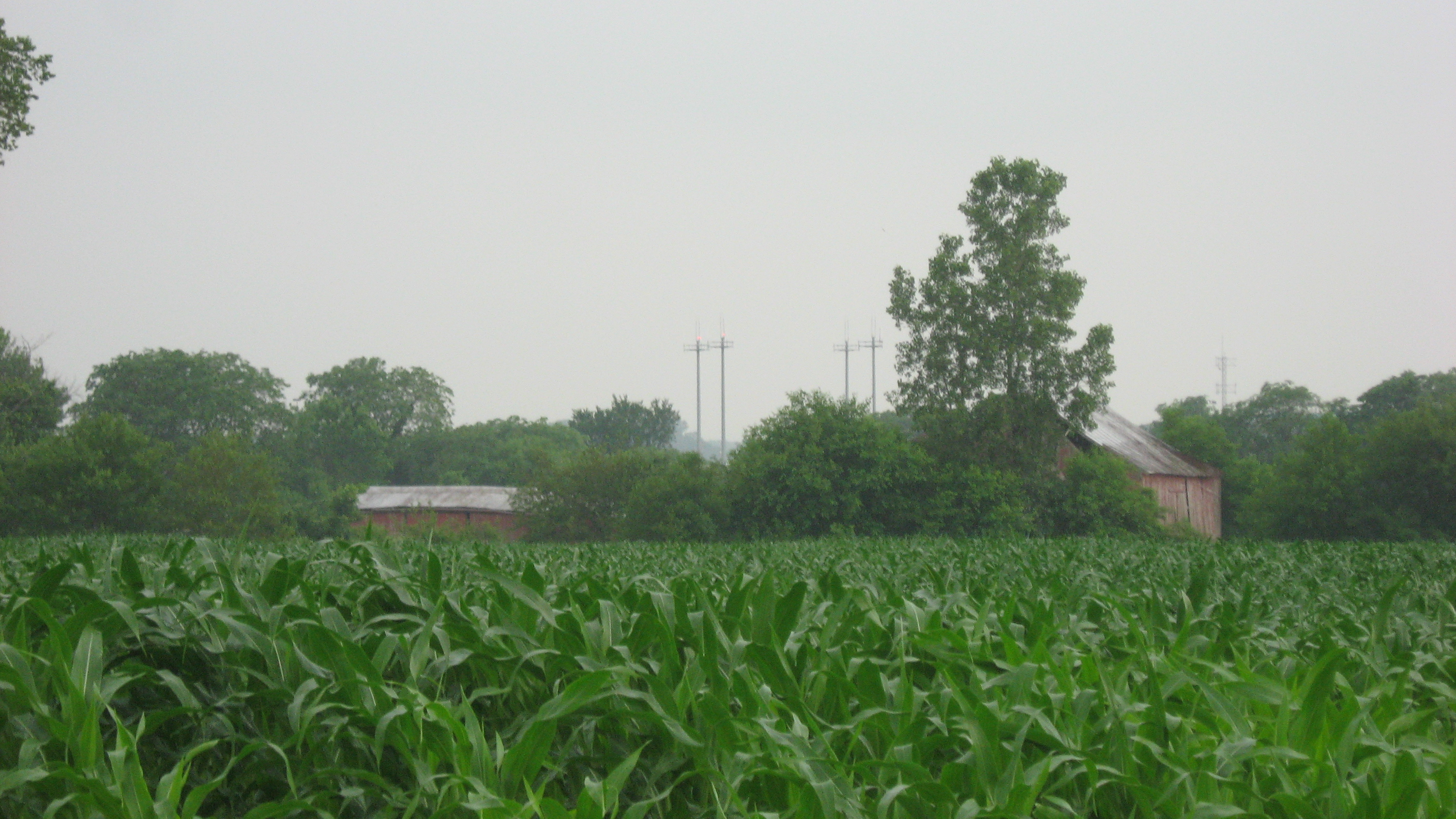
- A farm in the township

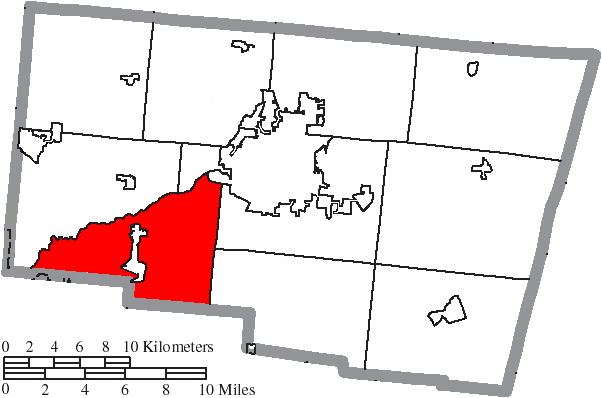
- Location of Mad River Township in Clark County
- Coordinates: 39°52′13″N 83°56′4″W
- Country: United States
- State: Ohio
- County: Clark

Area
  - Total: 33.9 sq mi (87.9 km^{2})
  - Land: 33.5 sq mi (86.8 km^{2})
  - Water: 0.42 sq mi (1.1 km^{2})
- Elevation: 902 ft (275 m)

Population (2020)
  - Total: 10,984
  - Density: 328/sq mi (127/km^{2})
- Time zone: UTC-5 (Eastern (EST))
  - Summer (DST): UTC-4 (EDT)
- FIPS code: 39-46788
- GNIS feature ID: 1085855
- Website: https://madrivertownship.org/

Mad River Township is one of the ten townships of Clark County, Ohio, United States. The 2020 census reported 10,984 people living in the township.

== Geography ==
Located in the southwestern part of the county, it borders the following townships:

- Springfield Township - northeast
- Green Township - east
- Miami Township, Greene County - southeast
- Bath Township, Greene County - southwest
- Bethel Township - northwest

Several towns are located in Mad River Township:

- The village of Enon, in the center of the township
- Part of the city of Springfield, the county seat of Clark County, in the northeastern corner of the township
- The census-designated place of Green Meadows, in the center of the township
- The census-designated place of Holiday Valley, in the south of the township

== Name and history ==
Mad River Township is named from the Mad River, which forms its western boundary.

Statewide, the only other Mad River Township is located in Champaign County.

== Government ==
The township is governed by a three-member board of trustees, who are elected in November of odd-numbered years to a four-year term beginning on the following January 1. Two are elected in the year after the presidential election and one is elected in the year before it. There is also an elected township fiscal officer, who serves a four-year term beginning on April 1 of the year after the election, which is held in November of the year before the presidential election. Vacancies in the fiscal officership or on the board of trustees are filled by the remaining trustees.

== Education ==
The majority of the township is in the Greenon Local School District. The township extends into Yellow Springs Exempted Village School District and Fairborn City School District.
