= Springfield Township, Clark County, Ohio =

Township in Ohio, US

- Township
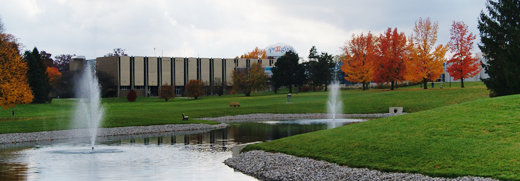
- Clark State Community College campus

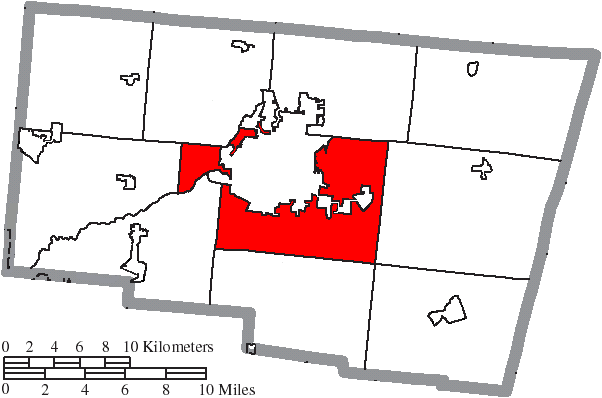
- Location of Springfield Township in Clark County
- Coordinates: 39°53′48″N 83°48′12″W
- Country: United States
- State: Ohio
- County: Clark

Area
  - Total: 31.8 sq mi (82.3 km^{2})
  - Land: 31.6 sq mi (81.8 km^{2})
  - Water: 0.19 sq mi (0.5 km^{2})
- Elevation: 1,043 ft (318 m)

Population (2020)
  - Total: 12,334
  - Density: 391/sq mi (151/km^{2})
- Time zone: UTC-5 (Eastern (EST))
  - Summer (DST): UTC-4 (EDT)
- ZIP codes: 45501-45506
- Area codes: 937, 326
- FIPS code: 39-74119
- GNIS feature ID: 1085860
- Website: spfldtwp.org

Springfield Township is one of the ten townships of Clark County, Ohio, United States. The population was 12,334 as of the 2020 census

== Geography ==
Located at the center of the county, it borders the following townships:

- Moorefield Township - north
- Harmony Township - east
- Madison Township - southeast corner
- Green Township - south
- Mad River Township - southwest
- Bethel Township - west
- German Township - northwest

Most of the township is occupied by the city of Springfield, the county seat of Clark County.

== Name and history ==
It is one of eleven Springfield Townships statewide.

== Government ==
The township is governed by a three-member board of trustees, who are elected in November of odd-numbered years to a four-year term beginning on the following January 1. Two are elected in the year after the presidential election and one is elected in the year before it. There is also an elected township fiscal officer, who serves a four-year term beginning on April 1 of the year after the election, which is held in November of the year before the presidential election. Vacancies in the fiscal officership or on the board of trustees are filled by the remaining trustees.
