= Greenon High School (Springfield, Ohio) =

Location
- 510 Enon Xenia Road; Enon, Ohio; Enon, Clark County, Ohio 45323; United States; 39°52′11″N 83°53′28″W

Information
- Type: Public, Coeducational high school
- Established: 1955
- School district: Greenon Local
- Principal: Joshua Newport
- Grades: 7-12
- Colors: Black, white and red
- Athletics conference: Ohio Heritage Conference
- Nickname: Knights
- Rivals: Shawnee, Northwestern, Catholic Central, Greeneview
- USNWR ranking: 186 (state)
- Communities served: Enon, Springfield, Hustead.
- Website: greenon.k12.oh.us

Greenon High School is a public high school in Enon, Ohio. It is the only high school in the Greenon Local School District. Greenon High School has been designated as excellent, as evidenced by performance on state achievement tests. In 2017, the graduation rate was 94%.

As of August 2014, Greenon High School has switched to a Jr./Sr. High School, now containing grades 7–12.

As of May 2017, a levy was passed that allows a new school to be constructed on the site of the current middle school, Indian Valley. The new school is planned to contain K-12. The current high school building will be torn down but the sports facilities will remain.

In September 2021, Greenon opened its new K-12 campus in Enon. The old Greenon Junior/Senior High School building and Indian Valley Middle School building were demolished. The athletic complex still remains at the site of the old high school.

== Enrollment by race ==
- White: 93%
- Black: 1%
- Hispanic: 2%
- Asian: 1%
- Two or more races: 4%

(2017 data by U.S. News & World Report)

== Male to female ratio ==
- Male: 50%
- Female: 50%

(2017 data by U.S. News & World Report)

== Greenon Football ==
Greenon won CBC (Central Buckeye Conference) division championships in 2005, 2006, and 2007

Greenon won OHC (Ohio Heritage Conference) division championships in 2019 and 2020

Greenon won its first playoff game in school history in 2020, defeating Cincinnati Taft 30-28

== Instrumental music ==
The Greenon High School Instrumental Music Department consists of the Greenon Marching Knights Marching Band, the Greenon Pep Band, the Greenon Symphonic Band, and the Greenon Wind Ensemble.

The Marching Knights compete in the MSBA (Mid-States Band Association) Double-A class circuit, members of the Symphonic Band compete in Solo and Ensemble contests, and the Wind Ensemble performs in OMEA District XII competitions.

== Background ==
Greenon High School was opened in 1955.
