= HD Media =

American publisher in West Virginia

- Type: Limited Liability Company, Private
- Industry: Newspapers, Magazines
- Founded: 2013; 13 years ago
- Headquarters: Huntington, West Virginia
- Key people: Doug Reynolds, Managing Director; Phil Perry, president
- Subsidiaries: The Herald-Dispatch; Charleston Gazette-Mail
- Website: hdmediallc.com

HD Media Co., LLC is a Huntington, West Virginia, based publisher of daily and weekly newspapers and magazines. It was established by Doug Reynolds in 2013 to purchase The Herald-Dispatch from Champion Industries.

== History ==
In 2013, Champion Industries sold The Herald-Dispatch to local politician Doug Reynolds, the son of Champion's chief executive. In 2014, the paper's holding company, HD Media acquired the Wayne County News and The Tri State Weekly (serving West Virginia, Kentucky and Ohio) in Wayne, West Virginia.

In 2017, HD Media acquired the Logan Banner, Williamson Daily News, the Coal Valley News in Madison and The Pineville Independent Herald in Pineville from Civitas Media. In 2018, HD Media acquired the Charleston Gazette-Mail.

In February 2021, HD Media had next acquired Lincoln Journal and Lincoln News Sentinel. In October 2022 HD Media acquired The Webster Echo. Also at that time, it had purchased The Virginia Mountaineer. On April 7, 2023 HD Media purchased The Lebanon News.

On July 5, 2024, HD Media acquired the Portsmouth Daily Times from AIM Media Midwest. On May 27, 2026, The Lebanon News and The Virginia Mountaineer were sold to Virginia Media. In August 2026, HD Media acquired 19 publications from AIM Media Midwest and six publications from AIM Media Indiana.

== Antitrust lawsuit against Google and Facebook ==
In February 2021, HD Media filed an antitrust lawsuit against Google and Facebook in the U.S. District Court for the Southern District of West Virginia on the basis of digital advertising manipulation. According to News Media Alliance, this is the first lawsuit of its kind being filed by a news outlet. Managing director Doug Reynolds has stated in an interview that "“These companies are more powerful than Standard Oil in its heyday, so no one wants to be the first to take them on. We felt the political and legal climate have moved in our favor and are ready to go ahead.” Paul Farrell, the lead lawyer for the suit has pointed out the digital advertising revenue of the company has declined despite a growing digital audience. Reynolds has reportedly spoken with other publishers and expects some will join the suit in the future.

== Assets currently and formerly owned ==
- Herald-Dispatch
- Wayne County News
- The Tri State Weekly
- Coal Valley News
- Logan Banner
- The Pineville Independent Herald in Pineville
- Williamson Daily News
- Charleston Gazette-Mail
- Lincoln Journal
- Lincoln News Sentinel
- The Virginia Mountaineer (2022 – 2026)
- The Lebanon News (2023 – 2026)
- Portsmouth Daily Times
