= Roger Osborne (writer) =

American writer (1936–2007)

Roger Solomon Osborne (July 3, 1936 – May 30, 2007), a resident of Fairborn, Ohio, was the author of five books about Appalachia: Land of Yesterday, The Mountains Wept, Pilgrimage To An Appalachian Mining Camp, Voices from Appalachia, and My Mountain Angel. He also was the author of Appalachia—The Land And Its People, a 20-page newspaper supplement published in 1992 by the Dayton Daily News for use in schools in the Dayton, Ohio, area.

In 1996, Land of Yesterday, Osborne's autobiography about growing up in a mining community in West Virginia during the 1940s and 1950s, was adopted by Dayton Public Schools for use in its classrooms. In 2000, The Mountains Wept, an autobiographical novel, also was adopted by Dayton City Schools.

His books are also being used in numerous other school systems throughout Ohio, Kentucky and West Virginia.

Land of Yesterday and The Mountains Wept were both selected as commemorative items of Dayton's Bicentennial Celebration in 1996.

Osborne's newsletter, Mountain Ink, has subscribers in 39 states. The newsletter serves as a link between Appalachians—those who now live in Appalachia and those who were forced to migrate to other parts of the country, especially during the 1950s and '60s.

Ohio Magazine featured Osborne's writings in a 12-page article in its September 1997 issue.

Osborne has been published in numerous local, regional and national periodicals throughout the country, and portions of The Mountains Wept were used in a Japanese television documentary.

Osborne is a native of Wharton, West Virginia, a coal mine community located in the southern part of the state.

Roger Osborne was born July 3, 1936, in Wharton, West Virginia. He died May 30, 2007, at 5:17 a.m. in Hospice of Dayton. He is buried in Byron Cemetery, Fairborn, Ohio.
