= Coal Valley News =

Newspaper produced in West Virginia, U.S.

Coal County News
- Type: Weekly newspaper
- Format: Broadsheet
- Owner(s): HD Media Co., LLC
- Founded: 1925
- Headquarters: 350 Main St, Madison, Boone County, WV 25130
- Circulation: 1,176 (as of 2016)
- ISSN: 0745-7111
- OCLC number: 9395264
- Website: coalvalleynews.com

The Coal Valley News is a weekly newspaper produced in Madison in the U.S. state of West Virginia. Published on Wednesdays, it has a 2016 circulation of 1,176, and is owned by HD Media.

The 2014 book The Coal River Valley in the Civil War: West Virginia Mountains identified the Coal Valley News as the "region's principal local newspaper." The newspaper's title has been described in national media as typical of Boone County, where the coal industry plays defining role in the local economy. It is considered a newspaper of public record by the West Virginia Secretary of State.

== History ==
Founded in 1925 by M.L. Jones, it achieved notoriety in 1931 when a local sheriff allegedly paid to have the plant damaged in an attempt to shut down production of the paper.

Amos Sullivan testified that on the morning of October 23, 1930, he had attended a deputies' meeting that had discussed recent opposition of the Guyan Valley News to Republican candidates favored by the sheriff's department. At that time the Guyan Valley News, which had been running editorials attacking the "Hatfield clique", was printed in the Coal Valley News plant. Sullivan testified that at the meeting it was said that "something had to be done" and claimed he had later been paid five hundred dollars by Logan County Sheriff Tennis Hatfield to damage the plant. He broke into the newspaper printing plant late at night, but was surprised by assistant editor Elmer Jones, who shot and seriously wounded him. Both deputy Henry Napier and Amos Sullivan pled guilty to the crime, with Sullivan receiving a year in prison.

In 1935, the paper was a prominent critic of the appointment of William N. Beehler as West Virginia relief administrator for the Federal Emergency Relief Administration, arguing that his nonpartisan approach to government aid programs was disqualifying.

The paper was acquired by HD Media from Civitas Media in June 2017.

The paper is archived by the West Virginia Division of Culture and History. It is owned by HD Media, and is a member of the West Virginia Press Association.

== See also ==
- List of newspapers in West Virginia
