= Green Township, Clark County, Ohio =

Township in Ohio, US

- Township
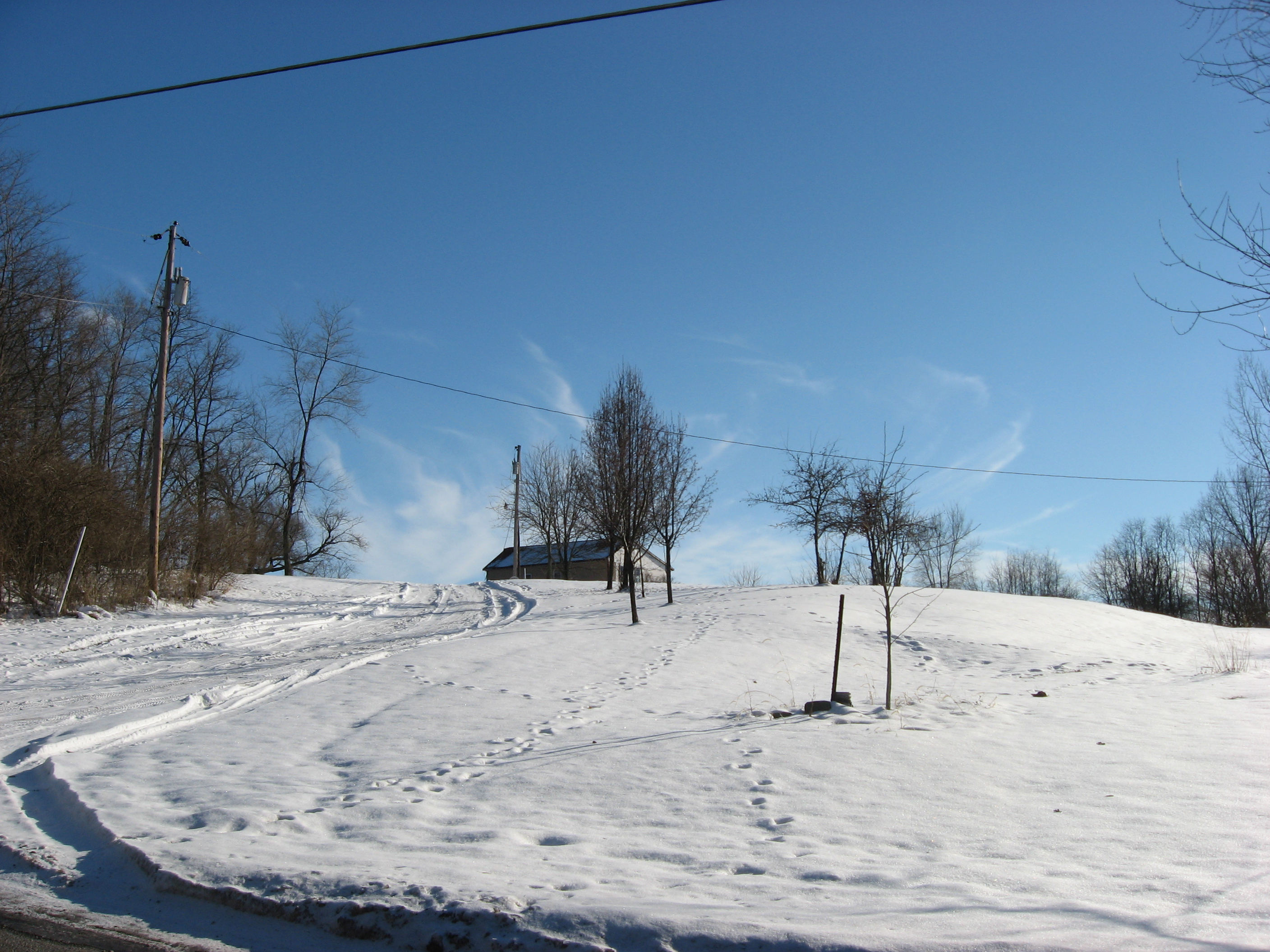
- Snow-covered scenery along Old Springfield Road

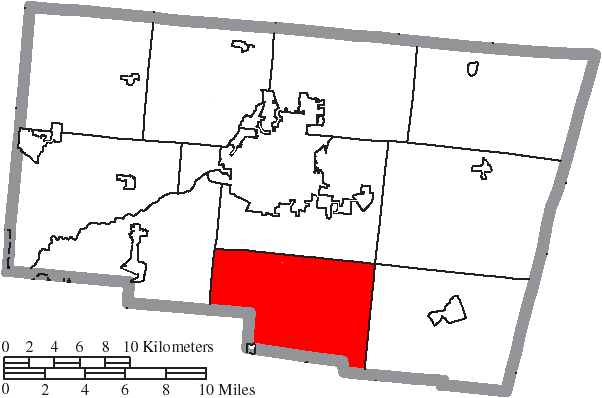
- Location of Green Township in Clark County
- Coordinates: 39°49′13″N 83°47′20″W
- Country: United States
- State: Ohio
- County: Clark

Area
  - Total: 35.8 sq mi (92.8 km^{2})
  - Land: 35.6 sq mi (92.3 km^{2})
  - Water: 0.19 sq mi (0.5 km^{2})
- Elevation: 1,030 ft (314 m)

Population (2020)
  - Total: 2,711
  - Density: 76.1/sq mi (29.4/km^{2})
- Time zone: UTC-5 (Eastern (EST))
  - Summer (DST): UTC-4 (EDT)
- FIPS code: 39-31703
- GNIS feature ID: 1085852

Green Township is one of the ten townships of Clark County, Ohio, United States. The 2020 census reported 2,711 people living in the township.

== Geography ==
Located in the southern part of the county, it borders the following townships:

- Springfield Township - north
- Harmony Township - northeast corner
- Madison Township - east
- Cedarville Township, Greene County - southeast
- Miami Township, Greene County - southwest
- Mad River Township - west

Part of the village of Clifton is located in the southern part of the township.

== Name and history ==
Green Township was organized in 1818. It takes its name from Greene County, Ohio.

It is one of sixteen Green Townships statewide.

== Government ==
The township is governed by a three-member board of trustees, who are elected in November of odd-numbered years to a four-year term beginning on the following January 1. Two are elected in the year after the presidential election and one is elected in the year before it. There is also an elected township fiscal officer, who serves a four-year term beginning on April 1 of the year after the election, which is held in November of the year before the presidential election. Vacancies in the fiscal officership or on the board of trustees are filled by the remaining trustees.

== Transportation ==
It includes Springfield–Beckley Municipal Airport.

== Education ==
The following school districts include portions of the township: Southeastern Local School District, Greenon Local School District, and Cedar Cliff Local School District.
