= The Virginia Mountaineer =

American community newspaper

- Type: Weekly newspaper
- Format: Broadsheet
- Owner(s): Mountaineer Publishing Company
- Managing editor: Scotty Wampler
- Founded: 1922; 103 years ago
- Language: English
- Headquarters: Grundy Plaza; Grundy, Virginia 24614 United States
- Circulation: 2,800
- Price: $.75
- Website: www.virginiamountaineer.com

The Virginia Mountaineer is a weekly community newspaper founded in Grundy, Virginia, in 1922. The paper covers news in Buchanan County, Virginia, as well as surrounding areas in Central Appalachia.
