= Williamson Daily News =

Newspaper in Williamson, West Virginia, US

- Type: Weekly newspaper
- Owner: HD Media Co., LLC
- Founded: 1912; 114 years ago
- Language: English
- City: Williamson, West Virginia
- Country: United States
- Circulation: 2,157 (as of 2016)
- Website: williamsondailynews.com

The Williamson Daily News is a newspaper in Williamson, West Virginia. It was founded in 1912 and is the successor to a previous weekly effort, The Southern West Virginian, founded in 1900.

As of July 3, 2019, the paper publishes as a weekly on Wednesdays. Generally it covers local events only, and The Herald-Dispatch circulates widely in the area with more broad coverage.

It was previously owned by Heartland Publications. In 2012 Versa Capital Management merged Heartland Publications, Ohio Community Media, the former Freedom papers it had acquired, and Impressions Media into a new company, Civitas Media. In 2017, Civitas sold its West Virginia properties to HD Media, parent of The Herald-Dispatch.
