= Osborn, Ohio =

Coordinates: 39°50′32″N 84°2′1″W

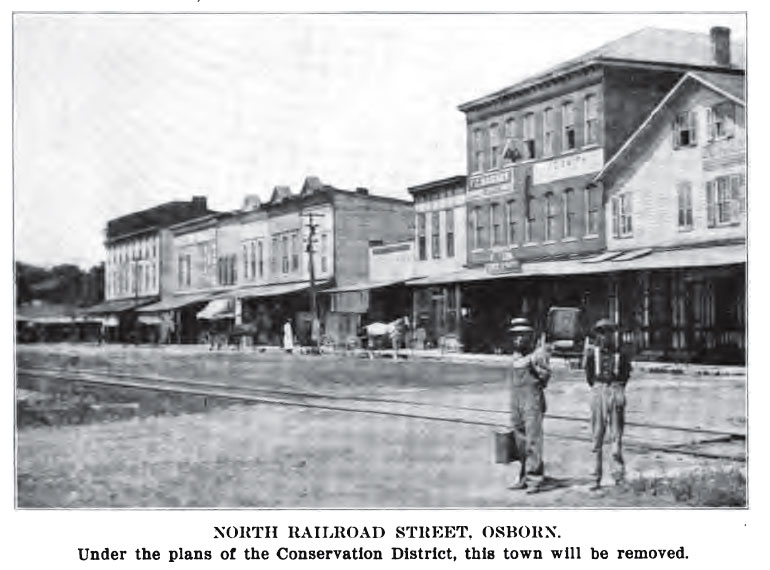
North Railroad Street in Osborn ca. 1908

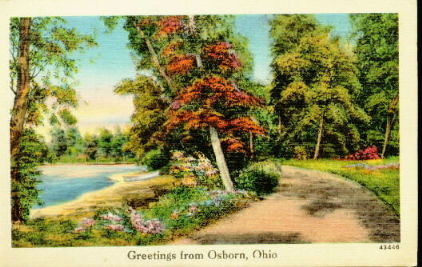
Greeting card with local Osborn scenery

Osborn was a town located near the Haddix Road-Ohio 235 intersection at the northern edge of Wright-Patterson Air Force Base in what is now the flood-prone basin of the Huffman Dam in the U.S. state of Ohio.

Osborn was named after the superintendent of the railroad named E.F. Osborn. The previously unnamed town allowed the railroad to be built through it after the nearby town of Fairfield refused the plan of the railway to go through there. Nearly the entire town of Osborn, along with the railroad, were relocated two miles away during construction of the Huffman dam to a site east of and adjacent to Fairfield, Ohio, in 1921. This was necessary because of the Miami Valley Flood Control Project and the Miami Conservancy District that was begun after the Great Dayton Flood (Dayton, Ohio) of March 1913.

Many of the original houses of old Osborn still stand in Fairborn, Ohio, in the "Osborn Historic District". On January 1, 1950, Osborn and the neighboring town of Fairfield were merged as Fairborn. The first business to depict the name of the new city was the large vertical sign of the Fairborn Theatre.

The old Osborn cemetery lies within the boundary of Wright-Patterson, near the north end of the main flight line, which used to be part of the town. During the building of the longer runway to accommodate the large B-36 Bombers in the 1940s, the old streets of Osborn were still visible on the ground near the airstrip.
