= Charleston Gazette-Mail =

Newspaper in Charleston, West Virginia

- The February 29, 2012 front page of The Charleston Gazette
- Type: Semi-Daily newspaper
- Format: Broadsheet
- Owner: HD Media
- Editor: Jeff Rider
- Founded: 1873
- Headquarters: 1001 Virginia St. E. Charleston, WV 25301; United States
- Circulation: 40,671 Daily; 68,940 Sunday (as of 2009)
- Price: $2.00 (Tuesday-Friday), $4.00 (Weekend)
- ISSN: 2576-2990
- OCLC number: 944248055
- Website: wvgazettemail.com

The Charleston Gazette-Mail is a non-daily morning newspaper in Charleston, West Virginia. It is the product of a July 2015 merger between The Charleston Gazette and the Charleston Daily Mail. It is one of nine papers owned by HD Media. It publishes Tuesday-Saturday, with the Saturday paper being dated "Weekend", with updates on its website on Sundays and Mondays.

== History ==
=== Charleston Gazette ===
Logo of The Charleston Gazette in 2001

The Gazette traces its roots to 1873. At the time, it was a weekly newspaper known as the Kanawha Chronicle. It was later renamed The Kanawha Gazette and the Daily Gazette—before its name was officially changed to The Charleston Gazette in 1907.

In 1912 it came under the control of the Chilton family, who ran it until its bankruptcy in 2018. William E. Chilton, a U.S. senator, was publisher of The Gazette, as were his son, William E. Chilton II, and grandson, W. E. "Ned" Chilton III, Yale graduate and classmate/protégé of conservative columnist William F. Buckley, Jr. Ironically, the paper's opinion page, usually on the left, carried Buckley's column until Buckley's death. In 1918 a fire destroyed the Gazette building at 909 Virginia St. The newspaper was moved to 227 Hale St., where it remained for 42 years.

Ned Chilton used to claim that the job of a newspaper was to "comfort the afflicted and afflict the comfortable." The newspaper's liberal reputation was enhanced by principal editorial writer and columnist L. T. Anderson, associate editor and two-time runner-up for the Pulitzer Prize. Anderson later moved to the rival Daily Mail as a columnist after he was passed over for an editorial position at the Gazette, and often used his Daily Mail column to snipe at his former employer.

=== Charleston Daily Mail ===
The Daily Mail was founded in 1914 by former Alaska Governor Walter Eli Clark and remained the property of his heirs until 1987. Governor Clark described the newspaper as an "independent Republican" publication. In 1987, the Clark heirs sold the paper to the Toronto-based Thomson Newspapers. The new owners moderated the political views of the paper to some degree. In 1998, Thomson sold the Daily Mail to the Denver-based MediaNews Group. Editorial writer Jack Maurice won the Pulitzer Prize for editorials in 1975 for a series of editorials he wrote the year before amid a battle over textbooks in Kanawha County. It was the first Pulitzer won by a newspaper in West Virginia.

The newspaper published in the afternoons, Monday-Saturday, with a Sunday morning edition, until 1961; Monday - Saturday afternoons from 1961-2005, Monday - Friday afternoons from 2005-2009, and Monday - Friday mornings from 2009-2015.

=== Combination of operations ===
Under a Joint Operating Agreement the two newspapers merged their production and distribution from 1961, while maintaining completely separate editorial operations. A combined Sunday Gazette-Mail (distinct from the 2015 fully-merged newspaper) was published on Sundays from 1961 to 1991, produced by both papers' staffs, and from 1991 to 2015, produced by the Gazette staff alone.

A similar combined Saturday Gazette-Mail was published on Saturdays from 2005 to 2015. It was likewise produced by the Gazette staff, but featured two editorial pages, one produced by each paper's staff.

=== Merger, sale, and bankruptcy ===
In 2004, the Gazette purchased the Daily Mail. In May 2007, the U.S. Department of Justice filed a lawsuit, alleging that the Daily Mail had been operated in an uncompetitive manner. The newspaper settled without trial and agreed a federal injunction prohibiting it from shutting down the Daily Mail until July 20, 2015. The previous owner was to be paid a fee to produce the paper during that era, and controlled its editorial content.

On July 20, 2015, owners merged the Daily Mail and Gazette without prior notice and renamed the paper the Charleston Gazette-Mail. The entire staff of both papers was given two-weeks notice and told to "reapply" for jobs at the new paper. The combined paper included both former Gazette and Daily Mail staff members, and included two separate editorial pages that were intended to represent the Daily Mail's more conservative views, and Gazette's more liberal views, on current topics.

On July 23, 2015, the Pension Benefit Guaranty Corporation filed a $1.3 million lien on the company because of "years of unpaid pension deposits".

On October 6, 2015, the previous owner of the Daily Mail, the MediaNews Group, filed suit in the Delaware Court of Chancery against the Gazette's owners. They alleged that:

- In the event the Daily Mail was ever shut down, the intellectual property of the Daily Mail, including the domain name dailymail.com and the trademark "Charleston Daily Mail", were to pass to the previous owner.
- Instead, the domain name dailymail.com was sold to the London paper, without MediaNews' permission, and the proceeds were spent by the Gazette's owners.
- The "merged" paper was named the Gazette-Mail, and continues to use the "Daily Mail" trademarks for its editorials, thus depriving MediaNews of the trademark's reverted value.
- The merger of the papers was announced unilaterally and subjected the MediaNews Group to possible antitrust liability.
- The MediaNews Group had not been paid its production fee for over two years, amounting to over $450,000.
- The merger required a "super-majority" of the combined papers' board, 4 of the 5 board members, with 2 of the members having been appointed by the MediaNews Group. No board meeting was ever held.

The matter was taken to arbitration and the Gazette was found liable on all counts. A judgment was awarded for almost $4,000,000. The Gazette appealed to the United States District Court for the Southern District of West Virginia but was again found liable on all counts.

In October 2017, the newspaper ceased physical printing of a Monday edition, substituting a "virtual edition" and website updates.

In January 2018, the company settled for an undisclosed sum with the Pension Benefit Guaranty Trust, filed under the WARN Act notice that up to 206 of its 209 remaining employees "might" be subject to termination and then filed for bankruptcy. This set up a 60-day period during which bids for the paper can be made, with the opening high bid coming from Ogden Newspapers, which publishes five other daily newspapers in the state. However, local politician Doug Reynolds, owner of the Huntington Herald-Dispatch, together with investors he declined to name, entered a higher bid and Ogden withdrew.

On March 9, 2018, bankruptcy judge Frank Volk approved sale of Gazette-Mail to HD Media. The company having met the conditions set forth in a February order, including bidding at least $500,000 more than Ogden Newspapers' initial bid of $10,911,000. The final sale price was $11,487,243. The previous day, Ogden Newspapers announced that they no longer intended to pursue purchase, leaving HD Media as the highest bidder.

On July 16, 2023, the newspaper announced the elimination of its Sunday print edition. Instead, a combined weekend edition would be sent out on Saturday starting Aug. 5.

== Awards ==
Eric Eyre, a Gazette-Mail reporter, won the 2017 Pulitzer Prize for Investigative Reporting for his documentation of the 780 million prescription painkillers that multibillion-dollar drug companies poured into small West Virginia towns via pharmacies.

Ken Ward Jr., a Gazette-Mail reporter, received a 2018 fellowship from the MacArthur Foundation (commonly referred to as a "genius grant"). Ward also was one of the first reporters chosen for ProPublica's Local Reporting Network, which began in 2018.

The newspaper has won the top award for general editorial excellence from the West Virginia Press Association each year since the Gazette and Daily Mail were combined.

== Business practices and controversies ==
Despite editorial support for many labor unions in other industries, in 1972, the company employed strike breakers to eliminate unions of its own. The company remains non-union.

Three days after running an editorial relative to a pension dispute between Patriot Coal and some of its former workers, the Pension Benefit Guaranty Corporation filed a $1.3 million lien on the company because of "years of unpaid pension deposits".

== Reporter firings ==
In 2022, three reporters from the Gazette, Lacie Pierson, Caity Coyne and Ryan Quinn, were fired after publicly criticizing a video interview company president Doug Skaff conducted with convicted Massey Energy CEO Don Blankenship, in which they criticized the exchange as too softball. Massey had been sentenced to one year in prison in connection with the Upper Big Branch mine disaster.

In the interview Skaff told Blankenship, "Thanks for what you did for the community down there. I know your heart’s in the right place."

The reporters criticized Skaff for weakening the Gazette's brand and reputation, built up over previous owners.

== Deletion of content ==
In 2022, an investigation by Dragline found that a story, reporting HDMedia president Doug Skaff being charged and convicted of cheating during a game of blackjack at The Greenbrier, had been deleted from the paper's website following Skaff taking charge of the paper. Following a reporter questioning the deletion, the story was reposted.

== Antitrust activity ==
On February 4, 2021, HD Media, the owner of the Gazette, filed an antitrust lawsuit against Google and Facebook, Inc., claiming that the companies have unlawfully manipulated the digital advertising market at the expense of the newspaper. According to The Wall Street Journal, while both Facebook and Google have faced antitrust scrutiny from the federal government, the lawsuit was the first of its kind to be filed by an individual news outlet. Later in the year, it was reported by Axios that over 200 newspapers across the United States have filed similar lawsuits against Facebook and Google under similar grounds.

== See also ==
- List of newspapers in West Virginia
