= Enon, Ohio =

- Village
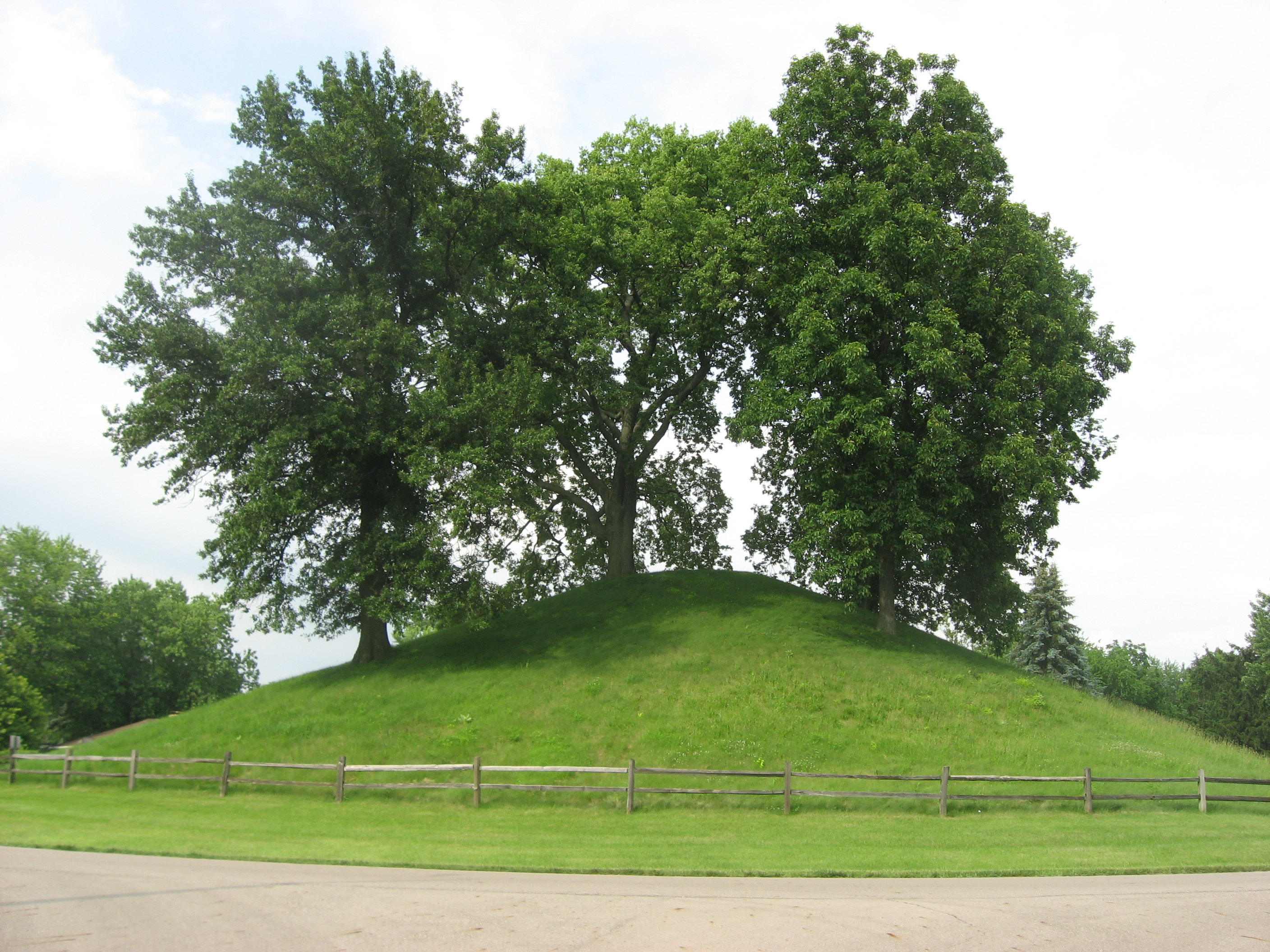
- Side of the Enon Mound

- Flag Seal

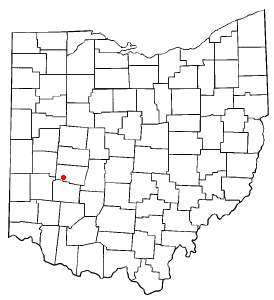
- Location of Enon, Ohio

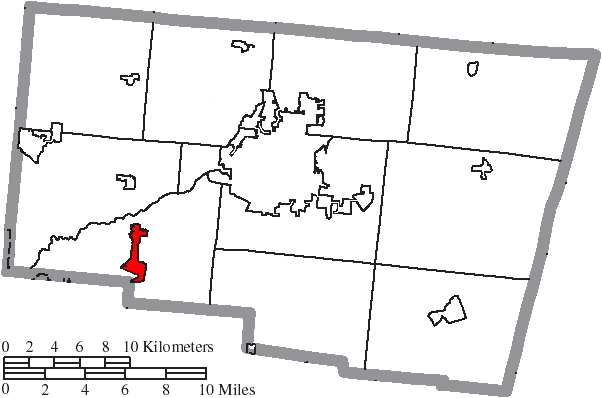
- Location of Enon in Clark County
- Coordinates: 39°52′13″N 83°55′59″W
- Country: United States
- State: Ohio
- County: Clark
- Township: Mad River
- Established: 1850

Area
  - Total: 1.29 sq mi (3.35 km^{2})
  - Land: 1.29 sq mi (3.35 km^{2})
  - Water: 0 sq mi (0.00 km^{2})
- Elevation: 902 ft (275 m)

Population (2020)
  - Total: 2,449
  - Estimate (2023): 2,437
  - Density: 1,893/sq mi (730.7/km^{2})
- Time zone: UTC-5 (Eastern (EST))
  - Summer (DST): UTC-4 (EDT)
- ZIP code: 45323
- Area codes: 937, 326
- FIPS code: 39-25452
- GNIS feature ID: 2398836
- Website: https://www.enon-oh.gov/

Enon is a village in Clark County, Ohio, United States. The population was 2,449 at the 2020 census. It is part of the Springfield, Ohio metropolitan area.

Enon is the headquarters of the Speedway gas station chain.

== History ==
Enon was platted in 1838. It is named for the river Ænon, in Israel, where the story of John the Baptist baptizing people takes place. A post office called Enon has been in operation since 1838. The village was incorporated in 1850. Mercury 7 astronaut Virgil I. "Gus" Grissom lived in Enon with his family while he was stationed at Wright-Patterson Air Force Base.

The Enon Adena Mound, also known as the Knob Prairie Mound, is Ohio's second largest conical Indian burial mound, and is located in Enon. This mound is believed to have been built by the Adena culture. The mound was reportedly used for reconnaissance by George Rogers Clark during the Battle of Piqua.

== Geography ==
Enon is located roughly 3 miles south of the old National Road.

According to the United States Census Bureau, the village has a total area of 1.28 square miles (3.32 km^{2}), all of it land.

== Demographics ==
Historical population
Census	Pop.	Note	%±
1850	294		—
1860	659		124.1%
1880	362		—
1890	331		−8.6%
1900	295		−10.9%
1910	249		−15.6%
1920	241		−3.2%
1930	280		16.2%
1940	281		0.4%
1950	462		64.4%
1960	1,227		165.6%
1970	1,929		57.2%
1980	2,597		34.6%
1990	2,605		0.3%
2000	2,638		1.3%
2010	2,415		−8.5%
2020	2,449		1.4%
2023 (est.)	2,437	▼	−0.5%
U.S. Decennial Census

=== 2010 census ===
As of the census of 2010, there were 2,415 people, 1,069 households, and 732 families residing in the village. The population density was 1,886.7 inhabitants per square mile (728.5/km^{2}). There were 1,120 housing units at an average density of 875.0 per square mile (337.8/km^{2}). The racial makeup of the village was 96.6% White, 0.4% African American, 0.3% Native American, 1.3% Asian, 0.4% from other races, and 0.9% from two or more races. Hispanic or Latino of any race were 0.8% of the population.

There were 1,069 households, of which 24.2% had children under the age of 18 living with them, 55.2% were married couples living together, 10.0% had a female householder with no husband present, 3.3% had a male householder with no wife present, and 31.5% were non-families. 26.8% of all households were made up of individuals, and 10.7% had someone living alone who was 65 years of age or older. The average household size was 2.26 and the average family size was 2.71.

The median age in the village was 48.1 years. 19.1% of residents were under the age of 18; 6.4% were between the ages of 18 and 24; 18.8% were from 25 to 44; 34.8% were from 45 to 64; and 20.8% were 65 years of age or older. The gender makeup of the village was 48.7% male and 51.3% female.

== Education ==
The village is served by the Greenon Local School District, which operates three schools: Enon Primary School, Indian Valley Intermediate School, and Greenon Junior/Senior High School. Enon has a public library, a branch of the Clark County Public Library.

== See also ==
Enon, a band named after the village.
