= Fairborn, Ohio =

- City
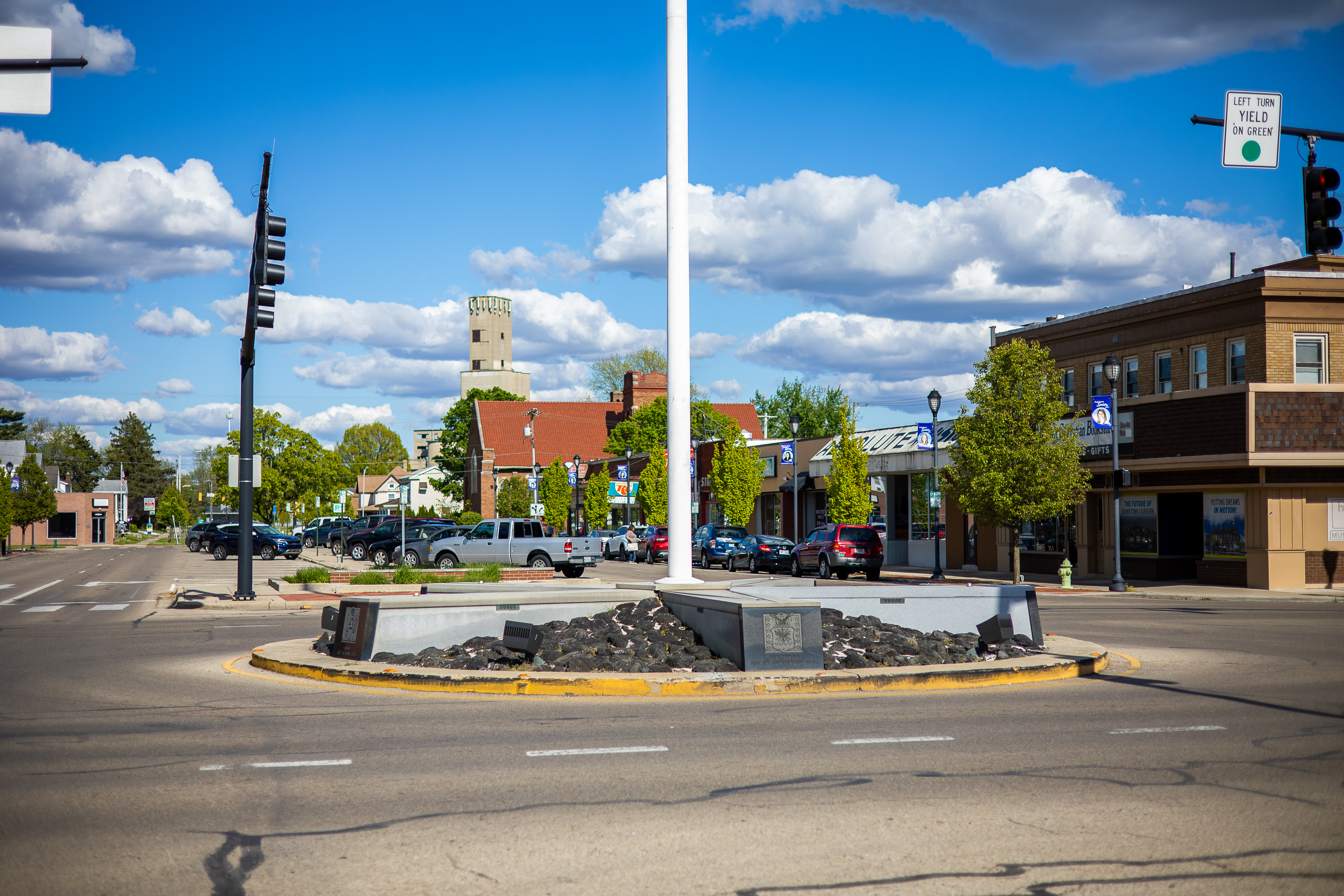
- Downtown Fairborn

- Flag Logo
- Motto: "A City in Motion"
- Interactive map of Fairborn, Ohio
- Location within Ohio Location within the United States
- Coordinates: 39°47′28″N 83°59′50″W
- Country: United States
- State: Ohio
- County: Greene
- Incorporated: 1950

Government
  - Type: Council-Manager
  - Mayor: Daniel R. Kirkpatrick
  - City Manager: Mike Gebhart

Area
  - Total: 14.58 sq mi (37.77 km^{2})
  - Land: 14.57 sq mi (37.74 km^{2})
  - Water: 0.012 sq mi (0.03 km^{2})
- Elevation: 840 ft (260 m)

Population (2020)
  - Total: 34,510
  - Estimate (2023): 34,729
  - Density: 2,369/sq mi (914.5/km^{2})
- Time zone: UTC-5 (Eastern (EST))
  - Summer (DST): UTC-4 (Eastern (EDT))
- ZIP code: 45324
- Area codes: 937, 326
- FIPS code: 39-25914
- GNIS feature ID: 2394726
- Website: https://www.fairbornoh.gov

Fairborn is a city in Greene County, Ohio, United States. The population was 34,620 at the 2020 census. It is a suburb of Dayton and part of the Dayton metropolitan area. The city is home to Wright State University, which serves nearly 12,000 undergraduate and graduate students. The city also hosts the disaster training facility known informally as Calamityville.

It is the only city in the world named Fairborn, a portmanteau created from the names Fairfield and Osborn. After the Great Dayton Flood of 1913, the region and state created a conservation district here and, in the 1920s, began building Huffman Dam to control the Mad River. Residents of Osborn were moved with their houses to an area alongside Fairfield. In 1950, the two villages merged into the new city of Fairborn.

== History ==
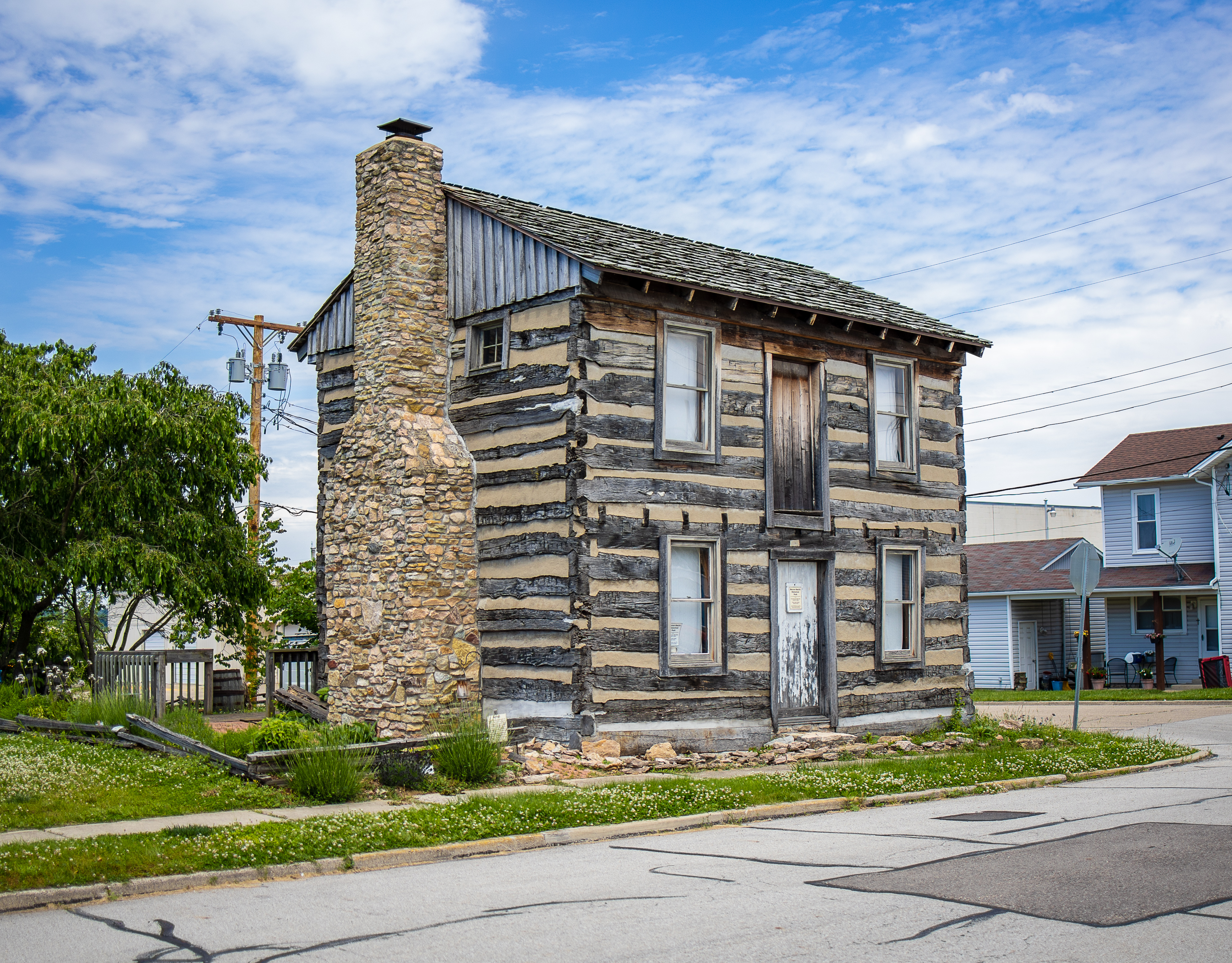
Mercer Log House

Fairborn was formed from the union in 1950 of the two villages of Fairfield and Osborn after a charter was signed on January 1st. Fairfield was founded by European Americans in 1816 and Osborn in 1850.The city was Incorporated on August 1st, 1950.

The area of the village of Fairfield was settled by European Americans before Ohio was admitted as a state. The first log cabin was built in 1799 by George Greiner. Pioneers migrating northward and westward from Kentucky and Virginia considered this area near the Mad River desirable for settlement. They were encroaching on territory of the native Shawnee, who sometimes raided the village. Settlers retaliated. No massacres were recorded but both sides engaged in taking prisoners.

Two local accounts relate to the origin of the name "Fairfield". A local Native American chief, possibly a Shawnee, made peace and exchanged prisoners with leaders of the settlement. He said to William Cozad that, when he looked out from Reed's Hill over the town,

Yonder lies a fair field. I see thousands of white men moving about in that beautiful fair field.

The other possible source for the name is after a Fairfield in England.

Nearby Osborn was named after the superintendent of the railroad named E.F. Osborn. The settlement allowed the railroad to be built through it after the nearby town of Fairfield had refused such construction. Many of the original houses of old Osborn can be found in Fairborn's Historic Osborn District, where an estimated 200 houses were moved by mules and tractors during the early 1920s.

From 1950 to 1970, the city grew to six times its former population, surpassing Xenia (the county seat) as the most populous city in the county, due largely to development and expansion of the nearby Wright-Patterson Air Force Base. Southwestern Portland Cement, another major employer in the region, operated the largest factory in the city during this period, mining the locally exposed Brassfield Formation.

Until the mid-1960s, the city of Fairborn prohibited African American residents and declared it a sundown town. Officials at Wright-Patterson Air Force Base are credited with working with the city residents to end such policies, especially as the United States military was integrated beginning in 1948.

The development of Interstate 675 began in the 1960s to serve as an eastern bypass of Dayton. In the early 1970s, construction began on the northernmost part of I-675, just east of Fairborn. The first segment terminated at N. Fairfield Road (exit 17). No further construction was done for over a decade. This section was jokingly referred to by some as "Fairborn's private Interstate". Dayton Mayor James H. McGee opposed the highway, contending that it would draw economic development out of the city into the suburbs, a pattern that took place in many other cities. I-675 was eventually completed by 1987.

Fairborn's growth slowed in the 1970s. It has resumed at a moderate pace since the late 1980s. It has since been surpassed by neighboring Beavercreek in population.

As of 2007, many residents of Fairborn continued to work at nearby Wright-Patterson Air Force Base, the home of the Air Force Materiel Command. It has been described as the largest, most diverse and organizationally complex base in the Air Force.

Many also work at or attend Wright State University, a university that became independent in 1967. From a small cluster of buildings, it has grown into a major campus with almost 20,000 students. Though Wright State has a Dayton address, it is legally within Fairborn jurisdiction. Wright State University has its own Police force, who are fully sworn through the State of Ohio.

Fairborn is the home of the largest elementary school in Ohio, Fairborn Primary School. Its students include children of military assigned to the Air Force base.

Fairborn hosts several events, such as an annual Sweet Corn Festival every August and the USAF marathon every September. It also has an annual 4th of July Parade.

== Geography ==
According to the United States Census Bureau, the city has a total area of 14.725 square miles (38.14 km^{2}), of which, 14.71 square miles (38.10 km^{2}) is land and 0.015 square miles (0.04 km^{2}) is water. 8.864 square miles (22.96 km^{2}) of the land area was zoned as some form of residential while the remaining 3.981 square miles (10.31 km^{2}) was either commercial, agricultural, or industrial zoning.

== Demographics ==
Historical population
Census	Pop.	Note	%±
1950	7,847		—
1960	19,453		147.9%
1970	32,267		65.9%
1980	29,747		−7.8%
1990	31,300		5.2%
2000	32,052		2.4%
2010	32,770		2.2%
2020	34,510		5.3%
2025 (est.)	35,754		3.6%

=== 2020 census ===
As of the 2020 census, Fairborn had a population of 34,510, 15,601 households, and 8,026 families residing in the city. The population density was 2,368.6 inhabitants per square mile (914.5/km^{2}), and there were 16,707 housing units at an average density of 1,146.6 per square mile (442.7/km^{2}).

99.9% of residents lived in urban areas, while 0.1% lived in rural areas.

Of these households, 23.8% had children under the age of 18 living in them, 34.8% were married-couple households, 24.0% were households with a male householder and no spouse or partner present, 32.4% were households with a female householder and no spouse or partner present, 36.6% of all households were made up of individuals, and 10.8% had someone living alone who was 65 years of age or older.

The median age in the city was 34.0 years; 19.8% of residents were under the age of 18, 13.3% were between the ages of 18 and 24, 48.0% were from 25 to 44, 21.4% were from 45 to 64, and 15.1% were 65 years of age or older. The gender makeup of the city was 46.2% male and 50.6% female, which equates to 94.6 males for every 100 females and 91.9 males for every 100 females age 18 and over.

The median income for a household in the city was $48,825, and the median income for a family was $62,995. About 12.7% of families and 18.3% of the population were below the poverty line.

Racial composition as of the 2020 census
Race	Number	Percent
White	26,869	77.9%
Black or African American	3,045	8.8%
American Indian and Alaska Native	107	0.3%
Asian	1,161	3.4%
Native Hawaiian and Other Pacific Islander	38	0.1%
Some other race	498	1.4%
Two or more races	2,792	8.1%
Hispanic or Latino (of any race)	1,321	3.8%

=== 2010 census ===
As of the census of 2010, there were 32,770 people, 14,306 households, and 7,995 families residing in the city. The population density was 2,458.4 inhabitants per square mile (949.2/km^{2}). There were 15,893 housing units at an average density of 1,207.7 per square mile (466.3/km^{2}). The racial makeup of the city was 84.8% White, 7.7% African American, 0.3% Native American, 3.1% Asian, 0.1% Pacific Islander, 0.8% from other races, and 3.1% from two or more races. Hispanic or Latino people of any race were 2.4% of the population.

There were 14,306 households, of which 26.3% had children under the age of 18 living with them, 36.7% were married couples living together, 14.4% had a female householder with no husband present, 4.8% had a male householder with no wife present, and 44.1% were non-families. 32.7% of all households were made up of individuals, and 8.8% had someone living alone who was 65 years of age or older. The average household size was 2.24 and the average family size was 2.85.

The median age in the city was 32.4 years. 20.4% of residents were under the age of 18; 16.7% were between the ages of 18 and 24; 26.3% were from 25 to 44; 23.4% were from 45 to 64; and 13.2% were 65 years of age or older. The gender makeup of the city was 48.9% male and 51.1% female.

=== 2000 census ===
As of the census of 2000, there were 32,052 people, 13,615 households, and 8,019 families residing in the city. The population density was 2,453.4 inhabitants per square mile (947.3/km^{2}). There were 14,419 housing units at an average density of 1,103.7 per square mile (426.1/km^{2}). The racial makeup of the city was 87.28% White, 6.27% African American, 0.40% Native American, 3.32% Asian, 0.06% Pacific Islander, 0.53% from other races, and 2.14% from two or more races. Hispanic or Latino people of any race were 1.69% of the population.

There were 13,615 households, out of which 26.7% had children under the age of 18 living with them, 42.8% were married couples living together, 12.4% had a female householder with no husband present, and 41.1% were non-families. 31.0% of all households were made up of individuals, and 8.3% had someone living alone who was 65 years of age or older. The average household size was 2.28 and the average family size was 2.86.

In the city the population was spread out, with 21.0% under the age of 18, 18.4% from 18 to 24, 29.3% from 25 to 44, 19.7% from 45 to 64, and 11.6% who were 65 years of age or older. The median age was 31 years. For every 100 females, there were 94.7 males. For every 100 females age 18 and over, there were 91.7 males.

The median income for a household in the city was $36,889, and the median income for a family was $44,608. Males had a median income of $34,853 versus $25,353 for females. The per capita income for the city was $18,662. About 8.9% of families and 14.2% of the population were below the poverty line, including 15.5% of those under age 18 and 7.7% of those age 65 or over.

== Economy ==
According to the city's 2021 economic data, the top employers in the city are:

#	Employer	# of Employees
1	Wright State University	2,300
2	Morris Home Furnishings	443
3	Peerless Technologies	300
4	Ali Industries	282
5	Kroger Co.	206
6	I-Supply	173
7	Ball Aerospace	126
8	The Design Knowledge Company	70

The city of Fairborn levies a 2.0% income tax along with a 0.5% "school district tax".

== Parks and recreation ==
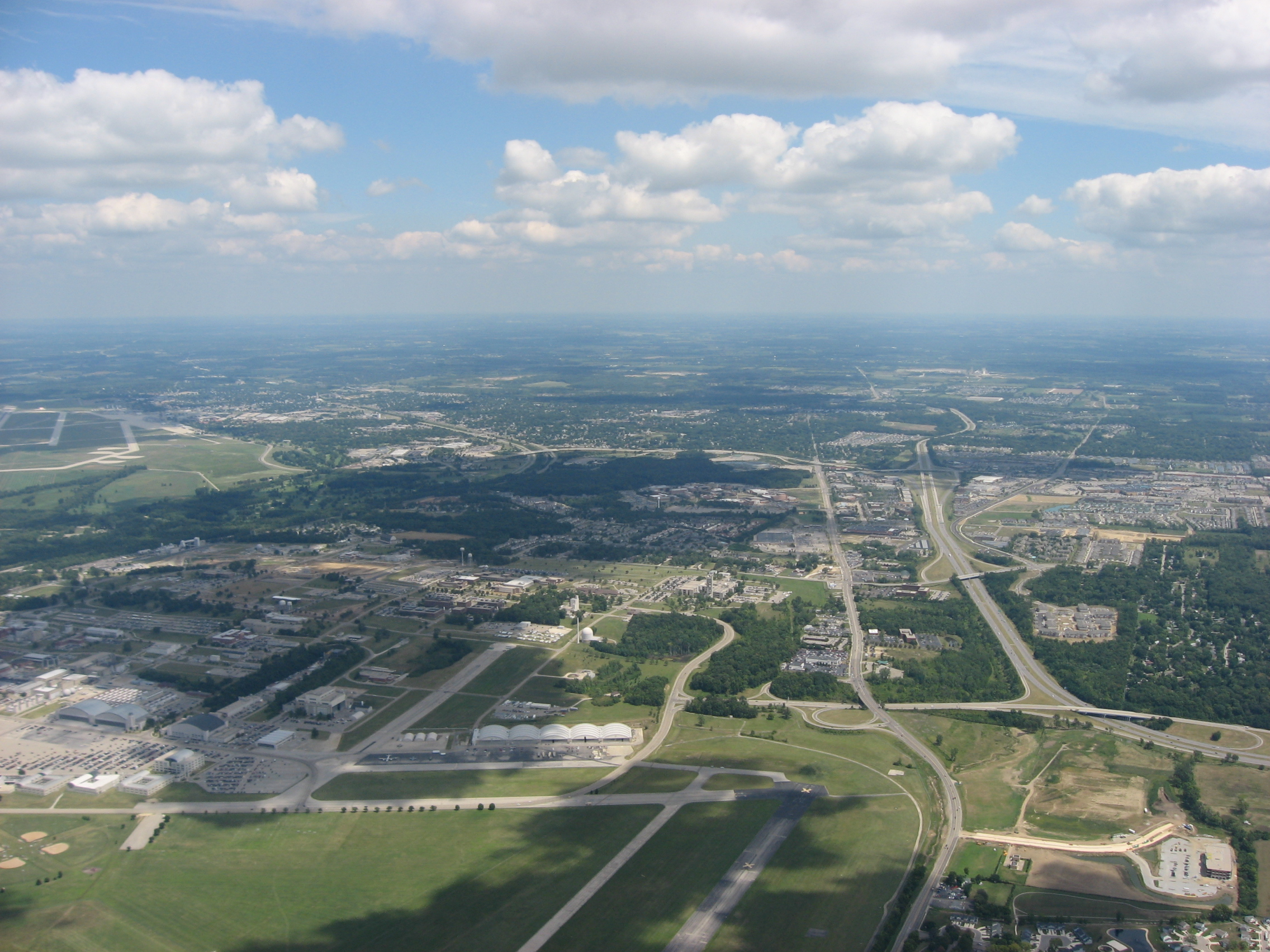
Aerial view of western Fairborn

The City of Fairborn's Parks & Recreation Division manages 773.2 acres of parkland, nature preserves, and cemeteries in the city. Fairborn also contains 2 nature preserves, totaling 242 acres, managed by Greene County Parks and Trails. The Beaver Creek Wetlands Association, a private non-profit organization, also manages a 130 acre nature preserve within Fairborn's jurisdiction. In total, 1,145.2 acres (1.8 mi^{2}) of Fairborn's 14.57 sq mi land area is a park, nature preserve, or cemetery.

They are:

- 5/3 Commons
- Central Park
- Cold Springs Reserve
- Community Park
- Fair Creek Park
- Fairfield Park
- Garland Wetland Reserve
- Hidden Hills Wetland
- Maplewood Park
- Mercer Log House
- Oakes Quarry Park
- Osborn Park
- Patterson Park
- Rona Hills Park
- Sandhill Park
- Shawnee Park
- Strautman Landing Park
- Tecumseh Park
- Valle Greene Park
- Valle View Reserve
- Wedgewood Park
- Wright Park
- Wright Brothers Huffman Prairie Bikeway
- Hall Cemetery
- Fairfield Cemetery
- Highview Cemetery
- Hebble Creek Reserve (Greene County)
- Cemex Reserve (Greene County)
- James P. Amon Biodiversity Reserve (Beaver Creek Wetlands Association)

== Education ==
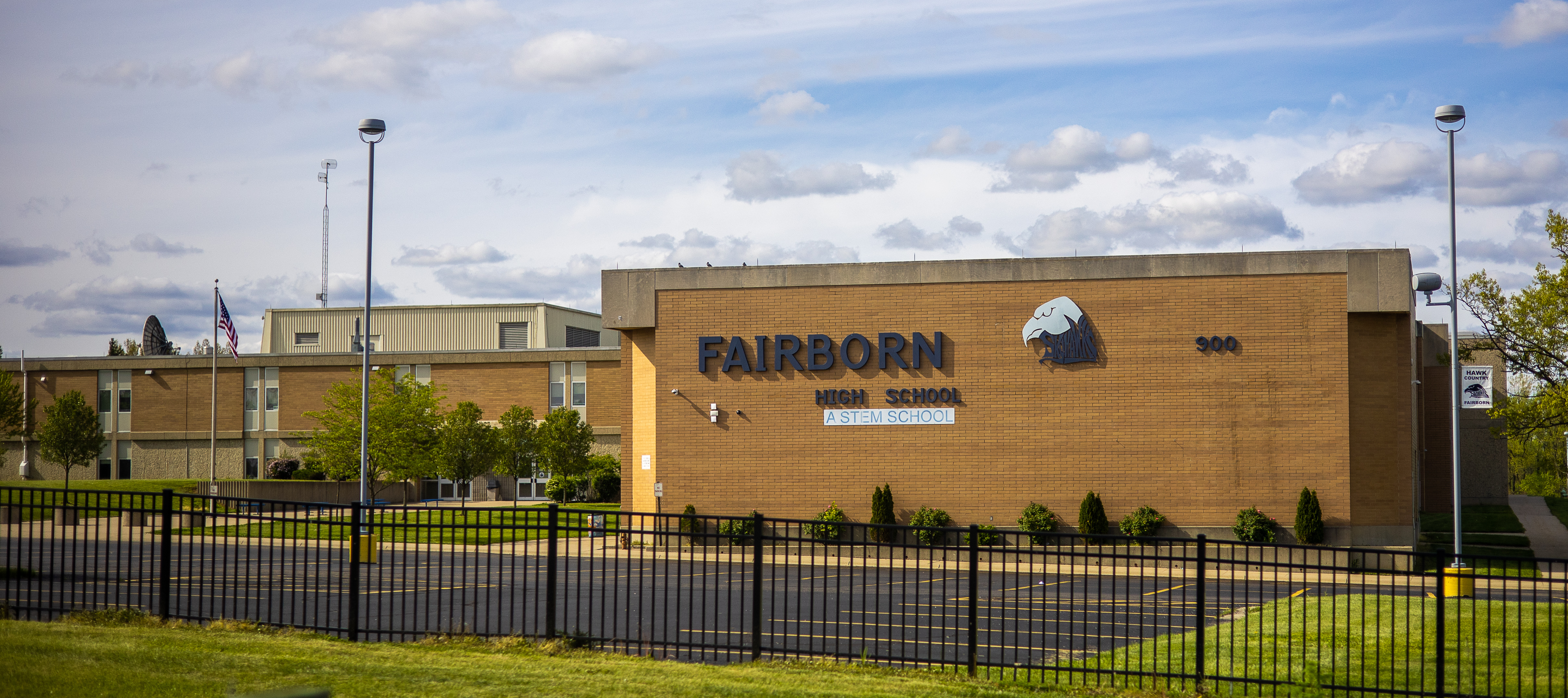
Fairborn High School

=== Public Schools ===
- Fairborn Primary School (formerly 5 Points Elementary School), grades pre-K-2
- Fairborn Intermediate School (formerly Palmer-South), grades 3–5
- Fairborn Baker Middle School (formerly Fairborn Baker High School), grades 6–8
- Fairborn High School (formerly Park Hills High School), grades 9–12

In November 2016 a Fairborn City Schools Facilities Master Plan was begun that started construction on all new public schools.

- A new Fairborn Primary School opened in 2020
- A new Fairborn Intermediate School opened in 2022
- A new Fairborn High School opened in 2024
- A new Fairborn middle school is currently under construction

=== Private Schools ===
- Bethlehem Lutheran School, grades pre-K-8 (Lutheran)

=== Post-secondary institutions ===
- Wright State University, a public undergraduate and postgraduate university with over 19,000 students
- Air Force Institute of Technology, a postgraduate university located on Wright-Patterson Air Force Base (open to uniformed military and DoD civil service personnel only)

Fairborn is served by a branch of the Greene County Public Library.

== Notable people ==
- Brian Billick — head coach of the Baltimore Ravens, 1999–2007
- Roger B. Chaffee — astronaut who died in the Apollo 1 fire
- Kevin DeWine — Ohio Representative to the 70th district; Speaker Pro Tempore of the Ohio House of Representatives
- Gus Grissom — astronaut who died in the Apollo 1 fire
- J. D. Harmeyer — entertainment figure who appears on Howard Stern Show
- Colonel Gregory H. Johnson — NASA astronaut
- Gary A. Klein — pioneer in the field of naturalistic decision
- Martha Masters — classical guitarist
- Buddy Miller — roots musician, singer-songwriter, and producer, member of Emmylou Harris's Spyboy Band
- Roger Osborne — author
- Michael J. Saylor — founder of MicroStrategy
- Mark Turner — jazz saxophonist and teacher at the Manhattan School of Music
- Jackie (Waddell) Warner — actress in the reality television series Work Out

== See also ==
- Fairborn Daily Herald, local daily newspaper
- List of sundown towns in the United States
- Nutter Center
- Mercer Log House
