= The Herald-Dispatch =

Newspaper in Huntington, West Virginia

- Type: Daily newspaper
- Format: Broadsheet
- Owner(s): HD Media Co., LLC
- Publisher: Doug Reynolds
- Founded: 1909
- Headquarters: 5192 Braley Road; Huntington, West Virginia, United States
- Circulation: 25,684 Daily; 27,828 Sunday (as of March 2013)
- Sister newspapers: Charleston Gazette-Mail
- ISSN: 1099-3096
- OCLC number: 12897734
- Website: herald-dispatch.com

The Herald-Dispatch is a non-daily newspaper that serves Huntington, West Virginia, and neighboring communities in southern Ohio and eastern Kentucky. It is currently owned by HD Media Co. LLC. It currently publishes Tuesdays-Saturdays, with the Saturday edition dated "Weekend", with updates on its website on Sundays and Mondays.

== History ==
The Herald-Dispatch was founded in 1909 when two Huntington newspapers, the Herald and the Dispatch, merged. In 1927, the newspaper became a part of the Huntington Publishing Company, operated by Joseph Harvey Long, the owner of the Huntington Advertiser. The company was operated by the Long family until 1971, when it was sold to the Honolulu Star Bulletin and then to Gannett 10 months later. Its companion afternoon paper, the Huntington Advertiser, ceased as a separate publication in 1979. Prior to the Huntington Advertiser's demise, the combined Sunday newspaper was referred to as the Herald-Advertiser, correctly depicted in the movie We Are Marshall.

For the six-month period ending March 31, 2005, the total average paid circulation was 29,098 for the daily edition and 35,552 for the Sunday edition. On May 8, 2007, the newspaper was sold to Gatehouse Media, then a month later to Champion Industries. On May 23, 2009, Champion defaulted on a $70 million loan from Fifth Third Bank and the previous owners, and eliminated 24 positions, representing about 15% of its workforce. In October 2011, they laid off additional employees. In 2013, Champion Industries sold The Herald-Dispatch to local politician, Douglas Reynolds, the son of Champion's chief executive.

In 2015, the newspaper ceased printing itself, contracting the operation to the Charleston Gazette-Mail and laid off its production staff. The newspaper is now printed in Charleston and trucked 50 miles to Huntington for distribution.

On July 16, 2023, the newspaper announced the elimination of its Sunday print edition. Instead, a combined weekend edition would be sent out on Saturday starting Aug. 5.

== See also ==
- List of newspapers in West Virginia
