= Freedom Communications =

American media conglomerate (1950–2016)

Coordinates: 33.7511°N 117.8505°W

- Founded: April 1950; 76 years ago
- Founder: Raymond C. Hoiles
- Defunct: March 21, 2016; 10 years ago
- Fate: Chapter 11 bankruptcy; Broadcast assets acquired by Sinclair Broadcast Group; Newspaper assets acquired by Digital First Media
- Successor: Sinclair Broadcast Group; Digital First Media
- Headquarters: Irvine, California, United States

Freedom Communications, Inc. was an American media conglomerate that operated newspapers, magazines, television stations and websites across the United States. Raymond C. Hoiles organized the company in 1950 and headquartered it in Santa Ana, California, but later relocated to Irvine. Its flagship title was the Orange County Register. Under Hoiles and his two sons, the company embraced a libertarian philosophy in its editorial content. Hoiles died in 1970 and the company was then managed by his heirs. The Hoiles family lost control of Freedom Communications after it declared bankruptcy in 2009. Investment firms then sold off most assets, with the name and seven titles purchased by private equity firm 2100 Trust, established by investor Aaron Kushner. The company went bankrupt a second time in late 2015 and its two remaining newspapers were sold at auction in 2016 to Digital First Media.

== History ==
=== Origins and growth ===
In 1919, Ohio newsmen Raymond C. Hoiles and his brother Frank A. Hoiles, who owned The Alliance Review, purchased the Lorain Times-Herald. In 1922, R.C. Hoiles and F.A. Hoiles purchased the Mansfield News. In 1927, R.C. Hoiles acquired the Bucyrus Telegraph-Forum and at some point he sold his stake in the Review back to his elder brother. He also sold the Mansfield News and Lorain Times-Herald in 1930 to Brush-Moore Newspapers.

In March 1935, R.C. Hoiles bought The Orange County Register and moved his base of operations to Santa Ana, California. He then acquired the Clovis News-Journal in November 1935. His brother F.A. Hoiles died in a car crash in December 1936. R.C. Hoiles bought The Gazette-Telegraph in January 1946, and Marysville Appeal Democrat in March 1946.

In April 1950, R.C. Hoiles merged his three publishing companies together to form Freedom Newspapers, Inc. The newly formed company published daily newspapers in California, Colorado and Ohio. In October 1951, Freedom acquired three Texas newspapers: The Brownsville Herald, McAllen Valley Evening Monitor, and Harlingen Morning Star. With the sale, the company owned 10 daily newspapers with a total circulation of 135,000. In 1965, Freedom acquired the Turlock Journal.

In 1969, Freedom acquired four Florida papers: Panama City News-Herald, Fort Pierce News-Tribune, Fort Walton Beach Playground Daily News, and the Marianna Floridan. In 1970, Hoiles died at age 90. The Freedom Newspaper chain at that time was one of the largest in the United States, with a total circulation over 500,000. The company acquired the Seymour Tribune in October 1973, the Porterville Recorder in April 1974, New Bern Sun Journal in May 1974, Victorville Daily Press in January 1978, Burlington Times-News in July 1978, and Huron Plainsman in November 1980.

=== Legal battle for company ===
Following the death of Hoiles, the company was owned by his three children, Clarence H. Hoiles, Harry H. Hoiles and Mary Jane Hoiles Hardie. A bitter feud ensued over the fate of the company, with H.H. Hoiles against his two siblings. Harry Hoiles was named company president following his father's death. He was rebuked in his attempt at becoming Chief executive officer and later claimed his siblings froze him out of company management and stopped him from selling his shares to a third-party. The eldest of the three, Clarence Hoiles, who was instrumental and establishing the company and worked with his father in upper management and eventually became board chairman, died in 1982.

As Freedom Newspapers softened its stance on Libertarianism, Harry Hoiles became disenchanted and attempted to breakup the company. At that time, Freedom was the country's 15th largest chain. It was worth $640 million and owned 31 newspapers with a combined circulation of 800,000. The goal was to form his own company. After the breakup failed, Harry Hoiles attempted to buy the Freedom. One offer was $700 million. Clarence Hoiles's three daughters sued their uncle for mismanaging the trust of their deceased brother. The courts ruled against H.H. Hoiles in 1987 and he eventually resigned from the board of directors. Mary J. Hardie, who served on the company board for many years, died in 1996. Her brother Harry Hoiles died in 1998.

=== Expansion into TV ===
Freedom Newspapers expanded into television in 1981 when it purchased KTVL-TV from Sierra Cascade Communication. It then purchased WLNE-TV in 1982 from Pulitzer Broadcasting for $15.5 million, followed by KFDM-TV and WTVC-TV in 1983 from A.H. Belo Corp. for $49 million, and WRGB-TV in 1985 from Universal Communications Corporation. In August 1989, the Huron Plainsman was sold to the Omaha World-Herald Company.

In August 1992, Freedom acquired the Fullerton News Tribune. In 1993, the company was renamed to Freedom Communications. In September 1995, Freedom agreed to purchase WPEC-TV from Photo Electronics Corp. The deal was completed about six months later. In March 1993, Freedom acquired the San Clemente Sun-Post, owned by a subsidiary of Howard Publications. It was then merged into the San Clemente News.

In February 1995, Freedom acquired The Tustin News. In June 1995, Freedom traded the Bucyrus Telegraph-Forum in Ohio and Dothan Progress in Alabama to Thomson Newspapers for the Desert Dispatch, Jacksonville Journal-Courier and Sedalia Democrat In May 1996, Freedom sold the Turlock Journal to Central Valley Publishing, a subsidiary of USMedia Group, Inc. In January 1997, Freedom acquired the Portales News-Tribune and Quay County Sun. In January 1998, the company acquired WWMT-TV and WLAJ-TV from Granit Broadcasting Co. for $170 million. In 2000, Freedom purchased all the newspapers in Arizona owned by Thomson Newspapers. The sale included the Ahwatukee Foothills News, East Valley Tribune and Yuma Sun.

=== Sale to private equity ===
In March 2003, a majority of the Hoiles family voted to sell the company, which at that time included 25 newspapers and eight television stations. Freedom Communications was valued at $2 billion. That October, a majority interest in Freedom Communications was sold to a group of investors led by the Blackstone Group and Providence Equity Partners. Through a stock arrangement, the Hoiles family descendants retained control of the board. The private equity firms received a management fee from the company's gross revenue. The family sold a 40% stake for $470 million, which allowed some members to cash out. As part of this transaction, Freedom had acquired substantial debt.

In 2006, Freedom purchased WCWN from The Tribune Company for $17 million. In spring of 2009, amid the Great Recession, Freedom Communications instituted furloughs for all employees nationwide, followed by a permanent 5% pay cut starting in July 2009. On September 1, 2009, Freedom Communications went into a Chapter 11 bankruptcy reorganization. The company left bankruptcy on April 30, 2010, under the ownership of investment firms Alden Global Capital, Angelo, Gordon & Co. and Luxor Capital Group. Lenders to the company also retained a stake in Freedom. Thus, the Hoiles family lost control of the business after sixty years of ownership.

On November 2, 2011, Freedom sold its entire television division to Sinclair Broadcast Group for $385 million in a move to eliminate the company's debt. The sale was completed on April 2, 2012. Freedom began selling the majority of its newspaper portfolio in 2012. The Seymour Tribune was sold to Home News Enterprises in January. Four papers in the Midwest were sold to Ohio Community Media, an affiliate of the private equity firm Versa Capital Management, in May. In June, the Clovis News Journal and two other newspapers in New Mexico were sold to Clovis Media, Inc. Freedom papers in Texas were sold to AIM Media Texas in June. Its Florida and North Carolina papers were sold to Halifax Media Group.

=== 2100 Trust ===
On July 25, 2012, The Orange County Register and six other papers were purchased by 2100 Trust LLC. The papers continued to operate under the Freedom Communications name. The principal company owner was Aaron Kushner, a former greeting-card executive with no prior media experience. Kushner paid $50 million for the assets and agreed to assume the pension liabilities. He soon increased staff, added new sections at the Orange County Register and began a new daily, the Long Beach Register.

In November 2012, Freedom sold the Colorado Springs Gazette to Clarity Media, a subsidiary of The Anschutz Corporation. In April 2013, Freedom sold the Yuma Sun and the Porterville Recorder to Rhode Island Suburban Newspapers. In June 2013, Freedom sold the Appeal-Democrat to the Vista, California subsidiary of Horizon Publications.

In October 2013, the former owners of Freedom Communications filed a lawsuit against Aaron Kushner demanding his company pay more than $17 million remaining on the sale. Kushner claimed that the prior owners had given him an inaccurate valuation of the assets and he faced $62.3 million in unexpected financial liabilities as a result.

In November 2013, Freedom purchased the Riverside Press-Enterprise from A.H. Belo Corporation for $27 million. In January 2014, the company laid off 71 workers in Riverside and Santa Ana. In March 2014, Freedom sold the Daily Press and the Desert Dispatch to New Media Investment Group. In December 2014, the Long Beach Register closed.

On November 1, 2015, Freedom Communications filed for Chapter 11 bankruptcy protection for the second time in its history. In January 2016, Freedom closed several of its weekly papers in Orange County. On March 21, 2016, a bankruptcy judge approved the sale of Freedom Communications and its two major newspapers, the Orange County Register and the Riverside Press-Enterprise, to Digital First Media, the parent of the Los Angeles News Group, which operated eleven daily newspapers in Southern California. After the sale, the subsidiary was renamed to Southern California News Group.

== Leadership ==
Founder and chief executive officer R.C. Hoiles led Freedom until his death in 1970. He was succeeded as chief executive officer by his son, C.H. Hoiles, who served until 1981, and then by:

- D.R. Segal (1981–1992)
- James N. Rosse (1992–1999)
- Samuel C. Wolgemuth (1999–2002)
- Alan Bell (2002–2006)
- Scott N. Flanders (2006–2009)
- Burl Osborne (2009–2010)
- Mitchell Stern (2010–2012)
- Aaron Kushner (2012–2015)
- Rich Mirman (2015−2016)

== Newspapers ==
Freedom's newspaper portfolio consists of:

Los Angeles County

- Weekly newspapers:
  - Easy Reader of Hermosa Beach (managed by Freedom pursuant to long-term agreement); includes 3 Easy Reader magazines:

- Beach
- Peninsula People
- Drop Zone

Riverside County

- The Press-Enterprise of Riverside
- Weekly newspaper:
  - Desert Enterprise of Palm Springs

Regional

- Unidos en el Sur de California (regional Spanish-language weekly)

Orange County

- The Orange County Register of Santa Ana
- Weekly newspapers:
  - Anaheim Hills News of Anaheim Hills
  - Anaheim Bulletin of Anaheim
  - Capistrano Valley News of San Juan Capistrano
  - The Current of Newport Beach
  - Dana Point News of Dana Point
  - Fountain Valley View of Fountain Valley
  - Fullerton News Tribune of Fullerton
  - Huntington Beach Wave of Huntington Beach
  - Irvine World News of Irvine
  - La Habra/Brea Star Progress of La Habra
  - Ladera Post of Ladera Ranch
  - Laguna News-Post of Laguna Beach
  - Laguna Niguel/Aliso Viejo News of Laguna Niguel
  - Laguna Woods Globe of Laguna Woods
  - Orange City News of Orange
  - Placentia News-Times of Placentia
  - Rancho Canyon News of Rancho Santa Margarita
  - Saddleback Valley News of Lake Forest
  - Saddleback Valley News of Mission Viejo
  - Sun Post News of San Clemente
  - Tustin News of Tustin
  - Yorba Linda Star of Yorba Linda

== Former stations ==
- Stations are arranged in alphabetical order by state and city of license.

Stations owned by Freedom Communications
Media market	State	Station	Purchased	Sold
West Palm Beach	Florida	WPEC	1996	2012
Kalamazoo–Grand Rapids	Michigan	WWMT	1998	2012
Lansing	Michigan	WLAJ	1998	2012
Albany–Schenectady	New York	WRGB	1986	2012
Albany–Schenectady	New York	WCWN	2006	2012
Medford	Oregon	KTVL	1981	2012
Providence	Rhode Island	WLNE-TV	1982	2007
Chattanooga	Tennessee	WTVC	1983	2012
Beaumont	Texas	KFDM	1984	2012
