= 1980 United States presidential election in Virginia =

- November 4, 1980
- Turnout: 81.49% ▲

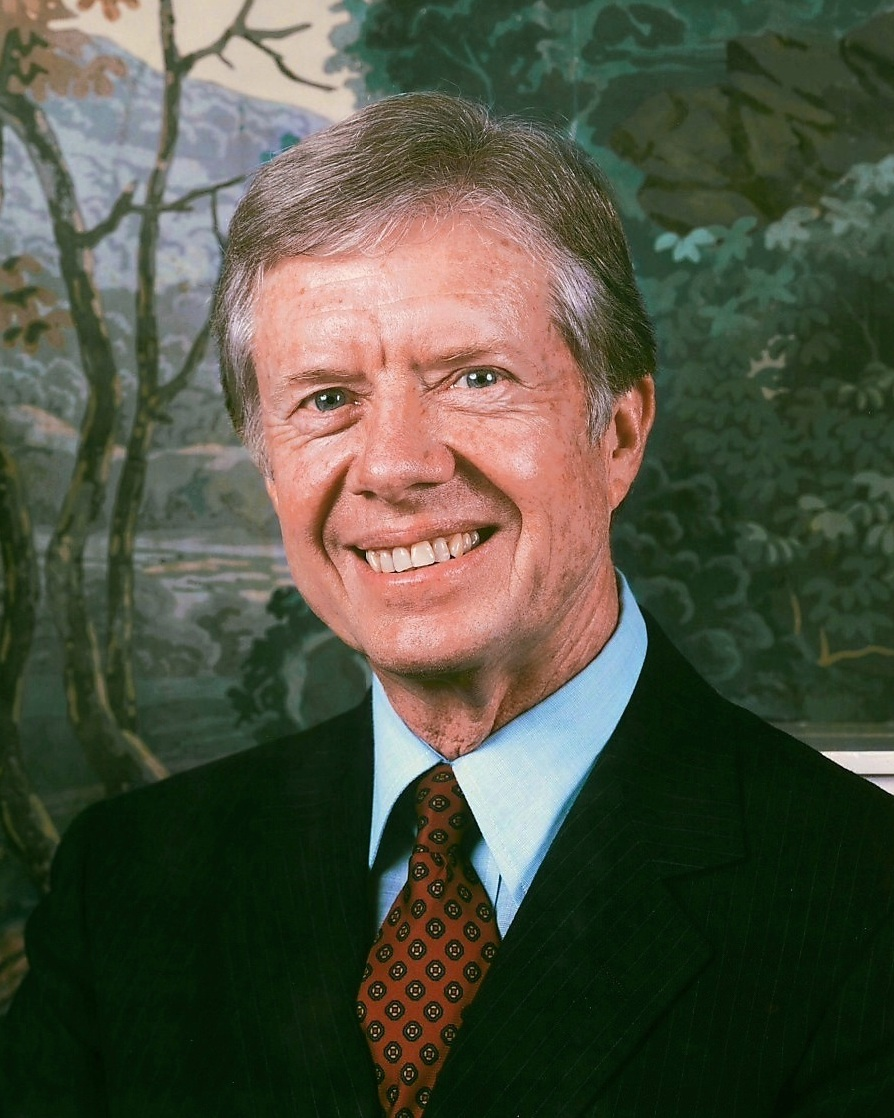

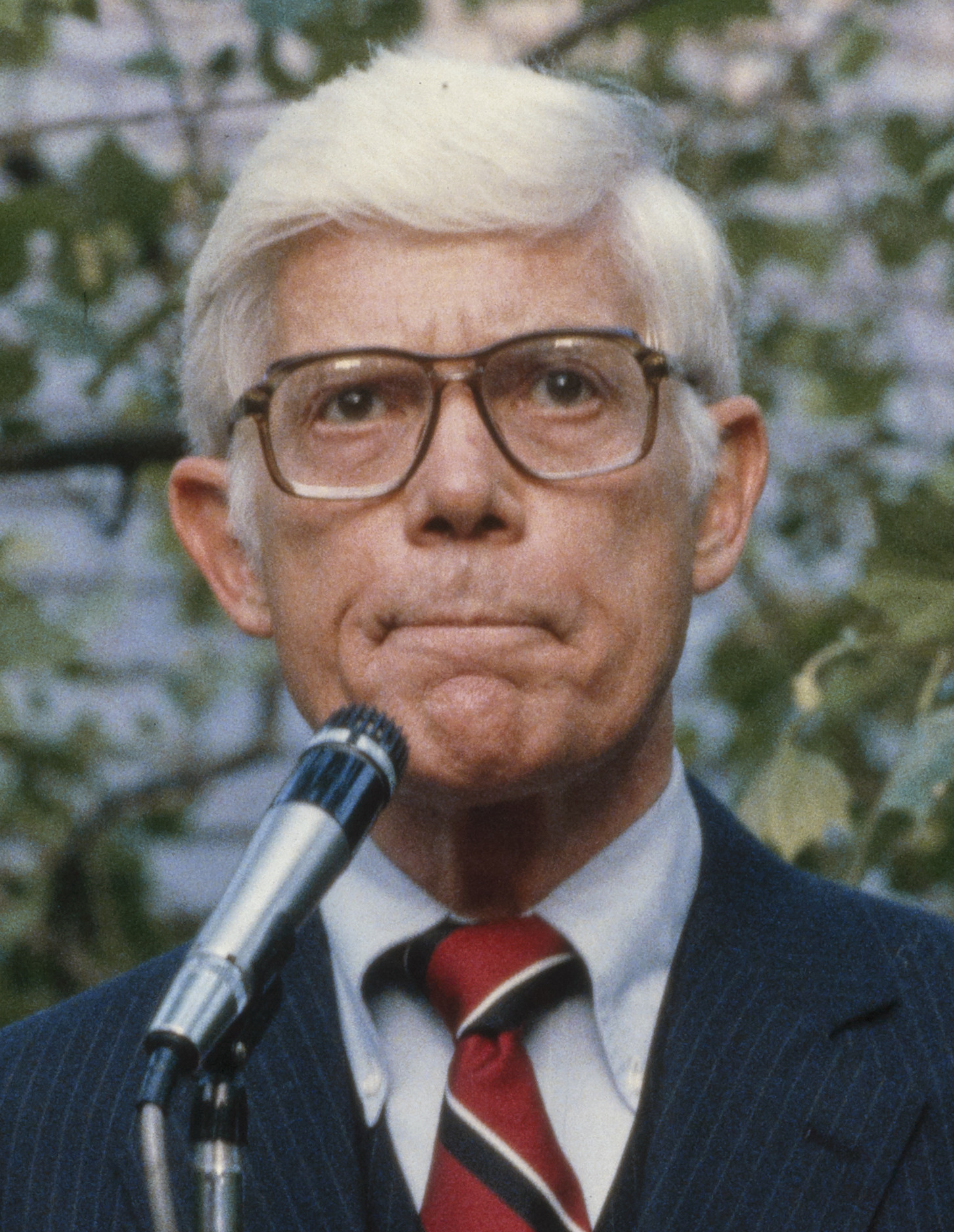
Nominee	Ronald Reagan	Jimmy Carter	John B. Anderson
Party	Republican	Democratic	Independent
Home state	California	Georgia	Illinois
Running mate	George H. W. Bush	Walter Mondale	Patrick Lucey
Electoral vote	12	0	0
Popular vote	989,609	752,174	95,418
Percentage	53.03%	40.31%	5.11%
County and independent city results
Reagan
40–50%
50–60%
60–70%
70–80%
Carter
40–50%
50–60%
60–70%
70–80%
President before election
Jimmy Carter
Democratic
Elected President
Ronald Reagan
Republican

The 1980 United States presidential election in Virginia took place on November 4, 1980. All 50 states and the District of Columbia were part of the 1980 United States presidential election. Virginia voters chose twelve electors to the Electoral College, which selected the president and vice president of the United States.

Virginia had voted Republican in all but one of the previous seven presidential elections, largely due to its large white Washington and Richmond suburbs that received large-scale in-migration from the traditionally Republican Northeast, alongside the Shenandoah Valley, being amongst the first traditionally Democratic areas of the former Confederacy to turn Republican at both the presidential level and in federal congressional elections. After the collapse of the Byrd Organization and the expansion of the state's formerly small electorate via the Voting Rights Act, these trends intensified except in the heavily unionized coalfield portions of Southwest Virginia, where unlike elsewhere in the former Confederacy, many newly registered poor and working-class whites voted Democratic. In addition to voting Republican in six of seven presidential elections, the state's Congressional delegation would gain a Republican majority as early as the 91st Congress. Nevertheless, it was 1970 before significant GOP gains occurred in the state legislature, and it was generally acknowledged that President Nixon offered no support to down-ballot Republican candidates as he was carrying the state by a landslide margin against George McGovern, who lost every county or city in the state except Charles City.

== Campaign ==
Republican nominee, former California Governor Ronald Reagan and Democratic candidate and incumbent United States President Jimmy Carter of Georgia both campaigned in Virginia during early October. Independent state Senator Harry F. Byrd Jr., who like his father had never previously endorsed a presidential candidate, endorsed Reagan in the middle of October, saying that Carter had a dismal record in controlling federal spending and the Soviet military build-up.

Among white voters, 59% supported Reagan while 33% supported Carter.

=== Predictions ===
Source	Ranking	As of
Kansas City Star	Lean R	October 12, 1980
The Roanoke Times	Likely R	October 26, 1980
Richmond Times-Dispatch	Likely R	October 26, 1980
Daily Press	Likely R	November 3, 1980

== Results ==
1980 United States presidential election in Virginia
Party	Candidate	Votes	Percentage	Electoral votes
Republican	Ronald Reagan	989,609	53.03%	12
Democratic	Jimmy Carter (inc.)	752,174	40.31%	0
Independent	John B. Anderson	95,418	5.11%	0
Independent	Barry Commoner	14,024	0.75%	0
Libertarian	Ed Clark	12,821	0.69%	0
Independent	Clifton DeBerry	1,986	0.11%	0
Totals		1,866,032	100.00%	12

=== By city/county ===
County or city	Ronald Reagan Republican		Jimmy Carter Democratic		John B. Anderson Independent		Barry Commoner Independent		Ed Clark Libertarian		Clifton DeBerry Independent		Margin		Total votes cast
County or city	#	%	#	%	#	%	#	%	#	%	#	%	#	%	Total votes cast
Accomack	5,371	50.21%	4,872	45.54%	292	2.73%	78	0.73%	73	0.68%	12	0.11%	499	4.67%	10,698
Albemarle	10,424	53.23%	7,293	37.24%	1,435	7.33%	140	0.71%	282	1.44%	8	0.04%	3,131	15.99%	19,582
Alexandria	17,865	44.23%	17,134	42.42%	4,546	11.26%	458	1.13%	326	0.81%	59	0.15%	731	1.81%	40,388
Alleghany	2,185	45.94%	2,411	50.69%	116	2.44%	16	0.34%	26	0.55%	2	0.04%	-226	-4.75%	4,756
Amelia	1,969	53.20%	1,643	44.39%	52	1.41%	8	0.22%	23	0.62%	6	0.16%	326	8.81%	3,701
Amherst	5,088	57.56%	3,476	39.32%	208	2.35%	20	0.23%	45	0.51%	3	0.03%	1,612	18.24%	8,840
Appomattox	2,548	60.42%	1,492	35.38%	85	2.02%	64	1.52%	23	0.55%	5	0.12%	1,056	25.04%	4,217
Arlington	30,854	46.15%	26,502	39.64%	8,042	12.03%	652	0.98%	744	1.11%	67	0.10%	4,352	6.51%	66,861
Augusta	11,011	64.32%	5,202	30.39%	539	3.15%	254	1.48%	100	0.58%	14	0.08%	5,809	33.93%	17,120
Bath	921	45.89%	999	49.78%	70	3.49%	1	0.05%	16	0.80%	0	0.00%	-78	-3.89%	2,007
Bedford	6,608	55.81%	4,721	39.87%	336	2.84%	90	0.76%	66	0.56%	19	0.16%	1,887	15.94%	11,840
Bedford City	1,145	47.26%	1,149	47.42%	75	3.10%	32	1.32%	20	0.83%	2	0.08%	-4	-0.16%	2,423
Bland	1,278	54.50%	1,002	42.73%	35	1.49%	16	0.68%	11	0.47%	3	0.13%	276	11.77%	2,345
Botetourt	4,408	51.24%	3,698	42.99%	329	3.82%	86	1.00%	71	0.83%	10	0.12%	710	8.25%	8,602
Bristol	3,432	52.68%	2,889	44.34%	160	2.46%	3	0.05%	31	0.48%	0	0.00%	543	8.34%	6,515
Brunswick	2,310	39.39%	3,430	58.49%	70	1.19%	22	0.38%	26	0.44%	6	0.10%	-1,120	-19.10%	5,864
Buchanan	4,554	42.85%	5,768	54.27%	95	0.89%	167	1.57%	37	0.35%	8	0.08%	-1,214	-11.42%	10,629
Buckingham	1,864	47.51%	1,933	49.27%	77	1.96%	22	0.56%	20	0.51%	7	0.18%	-69	-1.76%	3,923
Buena Vista	942	45.09%	1,031	49.35%	59	2.82%	38	1.82%	12	0.57%	7	0.34%	-89	-4.26%	2,089
Campbell	9,592	65.16%	4,473	30.39%	396	2.69%	167	1.13%	75	0.51%	18	0.12%	5,119	34.77%	14,721
Caroline	2,071	40.18%	2,924	56.73%	116	2.25%	15	0.29%	27	0.52%	1	0.02%	-853	-16.55%	5,154
Carroll	5,905	61.29%	3,437	35.68%	183	1.90%	37	0.38%	63	0.65%	9	0.09%	2,468	25.61%	9,634
Charles City	506	23.74%	1,564	73.39%	39	1.83%	7	0.33%	10	0.47%	5	0.23%	-1,058	-49.65%	2,131
Charlotte	2,322	51.26%	2,108	46.53%	59	1.30%	25	0.55%	8	0.18%	8	0.18%	214	4.73%	4,530
Charlottesville	5,907	40.56%	6,866	47.15%	1,377	9.46%	25	0.55%	8	0.18%	8	0.18%	-959	-6.59%	14,562
Chesapeake	17,888	48.47%	17,155	46.49%	1,189	3.22%	245	1.68%	148	1.02%	19	0.13%	733	1.98%	36,904
Chesterfield	37,908	70.71%	13,060	24.36%	2,182	4.07%	93	0.17%	353	0.66%	17	0.03%	24,848	46.35%	53,613
Clarke	1,876	57.44%	1,156	35.39%	177	5.42%	14	0.43%	40	1.22%	3	0.09%	720	22.05%	3,266
Clifton Forge	716	39.23%	1,012	55.45%	68	3.73%	21	1.05%	6	0.59%	2	0.18%	-296	-16.22%	1,825
Colonial Heights	5,012	70.96%	1,692	23.96%	219	3.10%	21	1.15%	6	0.33%	2	0.11%	3,320	47.00%	7,063
Covington	1,187	37.68%	1,813	57.56%	101	3.21%	99	1.40%	38	0.54%	3	0.04%	-626	-19.88%	3,150
Craig	768	43.17%	946	53.18%	41	2.30%	5	0.28%	18	1.01%	1	0.06%	-178	-10.01%	1,779
Culpeper	4,312	59.43%	2,519	34.72%	231	3.18%	127	1.75%	55	0.76%	11	0.15%	1,793	24.71%	7,255
Cumberland	1,515	50.10%	1,355	44.81%	51	1.69%	74	2.45%	19	0.63%	10	0.33%	160	5.29%	3,024
Danville	10,665	61.43%	6,138	35.35%	296	1.70%	198	1.14%	56	0.32%	9	0.05%	4,527	26.08%	17,362
Dickenson	3,687	46.12%	4,177	52.25%	77	0.96%	16	0.20%	31	0.39%	7	0.09%	-490	-6.13%	7,995
Dinwiddie	3,369	48.01%	3,475	49.52%	107	1.52%	27	0.38%	30	0.43%	10	0.14%	-106	-1.51%	7,018
Emporia	988	51.95%	855	44.95%	41	2.16%	7	0.37%	8	0.42%	3	0.16%	133	7.00%	1,902
Essex	1,581	52.93%	1,280	42.85%	76	2.54%	26	0.87%	20	0.67%	4	0.13%	301	10.08%	2,987
Fairfax	137,620	57.41%	73,734	30.76%	24,605	10.26%	1,557	0.65%	1,933	0.81%	256	0.11%	63,886	26.65%	239,705
Fairfax City	4,475	55.91%	2,614	32.66%	800	10.00%	42	0.52%	65	0.81%	8	0.10%	1,861	23.25%	8,004
Falls Church	2,485	52.23%	1,703	35.79%	497	10.45%	113	0.97%	93	0.80%	15	0.13%	782	16.44%	4,758
Fauquier	6,782	58.11%	4,119	35.30%	548	4.70%	113	0.97%	93	0.80%	15	0.13%	2,663	22.81%	11,670
Floyd	2,447	56.60%	1,642	37.98%	131	3.03%	59	1.36%	42	0.97%	2	0.05%	805	18.62%	4,323
Fluvanna	1,605	50.41%	1,424	44.72%	108	3.39%	17	0.53%	28	0.88%	2	0.06%	181	5.69%	3,184
Franklin	4,993	45.02%	5,685	51.26%	304	2.74%	40	0.36%	63	0.57%	5	0.05%	-692	-6.24%	11,090
Franklin City	1,045	42.55%	1,324	53.91%	62	2.52%	5	0.20%	15	0.61%	5	0.20%	-279	-11.36%	2,456
Frederick	7,293	67.61%	2,948	27.33%	455	4.22%	26	0.24%	62	0.57%	3	0.03%	4,345	40.28%	10,787
Fredericksburg	2,502	50.36%	2,174	43.76%	245	4.93%	9	0.18%	34	0.68%	4	0.08%	328	6.60%	4,968
Galax	1,188	51.81%	1,061	46.27%	31	1.35%	3	0.13%	6	0.26%	4	0.17%	127	5.54%	2,293
Giles	2,978	42.91%	3,627	52.26%	211	3.04%	54	0.78%	63	0.91%	7	0.10%	-649	-9.35%	6,940
Gloucester	4,261	53.96%	3,138	39.74%	354	4.48%	76	0.96%	56	0.71%	12	0.15%	1,123	14.22%	7,897
Goochland	2,423	49.68%	2,290	46.96%	113	2.32%	11	0.23%	32	0.66%	8	0.16%	133	2.72%	4,877
Grayson	3,494	53.37%	2,875	43.91%	106	1.62%	26	0.40%	39	0.60%	7	0.11%	619	9.46%	6,547
Greene	1,702	60.55%	925	32.91%	105	3.74%	47	1.67%	22	0.78%	10	0.36%	777	27.64%	2,811
Greensville	1,583	41.66%	2,142	56.37%	39	1.03%	18	0.47%	12	0.32%	6	0.16%	-559	-14.71%	3,800
Halifax	5,088	51.73%	4,528	46.03%	125	1.27%	57	0.58%	30	0.31%	8	0.08%	560	5.70%	9,836
Hampton	17,023	45.08%	18,517	49.03%	1,598	4.23%	329	0.87%	234	0.62%	64	0.17%	-1,494	-3.95%	37,765
Hanover	14,262	70.02%	5,383	26.43%	589	2.89%	32	0.16%	99	0.49%	3	0.01%	8,879	43.59%	20,368
Harrisonburg	3,388	58.45%	1,896	32.71%	403	6.95%	61	1.05%	39	0.67%	9	0.16%	1,492	25.74%	5,796
Henrico	50,505	66.85%	21,023	27.83%	2,956	3.91%	595	0.79%	422	0.56%	50	0.07%	29,482	39.02%	75,551
Henry	8,258	46.44%	8,800	49.49%	355	2.00%	247	1.39%	103	0.58%	20	0.11%	-542	-3.05%	17,783
Highland	751	58.76%	487	38.11%	25	1.96%	10	0.78%	5	0.39%	0	0.00%	264	20.65%	1,278
Hopewell	4,423	56.19%	3,102	39.41%	178	2.26%	97	1.23%	57	0.72%	15	0.19%	1,321	16.78%	7,872
Isle of Wight	3,526	45.30%	3,951	50.76%	197	2.53%	35	0.45%	64	0.82%	11	0.14%	-425	-5.46%	7,784
James City	4,289	53.29%	3,068	38.12%	551	6.85%	71	0.88%	55	0.68%	14	0.17%	1,221	15.17%	8,048
King and Queen	949	44.14%	1,128	52.47%	43	2.00%	5	0.23%	21	0.98%	4	0.19%	-179	-8.33%	2,150
King George	1,784	53.54%	1,318	39.56%	185	5.55%	7	0.21%	35	1.05%	3	0.09%	466	13.98%	3,332
King William	2,036	56.54%	1,446	40.16%	80	2.22%	14	0.39%	24	0.67%	1	0.03%	590	16.38%	3,601
Lancaster	2,780	61.01%	1,567	34.39%	106	2.33%	69	1.51%	24	0.53%	11	0.24%	1,213	26.62%	4,557
Lee	4,417	47.10%	4,758	50.74%	137	1.46%	28	0.30%	33	0.35%	4	0.04%	-341	-3.64%	9,377
Lexington	956	45.90%	963	46.23%	129	6.19%	16	0.77%	19	0.91%	0	0.00%	-7	-0.33%	2,083
Loudoun	12,076	58.93%	6,694	32.67%	1,312	6.40%	201	0.98%	166	0.81%	43	0.21%	5,382	26.26%	20,492
Louisa	2,633	46.14%	2,809	49.23%	160	2.80%	38	0.67%	58	1.02%	8	0.14%	-176	-3.09%	5,706
Lunenburg	2,045	49.44%	1,958	47.34%	59	1.43%	55	1.33%	8	0.19%	11	0.27%	87	2.10%	4,136
Lynchburg	15,245	62.44%	7,783	31.88%	854	3.50%	373	1.53%	128	0.52%	34	0.14%	7,462	30.56%	24,417
Madison	1,959	55.64%	1,351	38.37%	156	4.43%	27	0.77%	27	0.77%	1	0.03%	608	17.27%	3,521
Manassas	3,009	60.76%	1,565	31.60%	318	6.42%	23	0.46%	31	0.63%	6	0.12%	1,444	29.16%	4,952
Manassas Park	729	58.13%	447	35.65%	52	4.15%	7	0.56%	19	1.52%	0	0.00%	282	22.48%	1,254
Martinsville	3,433	48.82%	3,337	47.45%	162	2.30%	70	1.00%	22	0.31%	8	0.11%	96	1.37%	7,032
Mathews	2,204	59.31%	1,300	34.98%	148	3.98%	37	1.00%	19	0.51%	8	0.22%	904	24.33%	3,716
Mecklenburg	4,853	54.45%	3,790	42.52%	142	1.59%	81	0.91%	32	0.36%	15	0.17%	1,063	11.93%	8,913
Middlesex	1,810	54.13%	1,395	41.72%	90	2.69%	25	0.75%	15	0.45%	9	0.27%	415	12.41%	3,344
Montgomery	8,222	47.41%	7,455	42.98%	1,400	8.07%	93	0.54%	161	0.93%	13	0.07%	767	4.43%	17,344
Nelson	1,866	41.50%	2,410	53.60%	143	3.18%	35	0.78%	41	0.91%	1	0.02%	-544	-12.10%	4,496
New Kent	1,739	57.30%	1,204	39.67%	68	2.24%	9	0.30%	15	0.49%	0	0.00%	535	17.63%	3,035
Newport News	22,423	47.73%	22,066	46.97%	2,068	4.40%	114	0.24%	268	0.57%	43	0.09%	357	0.76%	46,982
Norfolk	27,506	40.93%	35,118	52.26%	3,333	4.96%	623	0.93%	488	0.73%	132	0.20%	-7,612	-11.33%	67,200
Northampton	2,165	45.65%	2,363	49.82%	114	2.40%	53	1.12%	34	0.72%	14	0.30%	-198	-4.17%	4,743
Northumberland	2,598	60.00%	1,551	35.82%	109	2.52%	42	0.97%	20	0.46%	10	0.23%	1,047	24.18%	4,330
Norton	572	40.86%	762	54.43%	42	3.00%	12	0.86%	11	0.79%	1	0.07%	-190	-13.57%	1,400
Nottoway	2,813	50.13%	2,593	46.21%	113	2.01%	63	1.12%	22	0.39%	7	0.12%	220	3.92%	5,611
Orange	3,381	54.90%	2,420	39.30%	241	3.91%	54	0.88%	58	0.94%	4	0.06%	961	15.60%	6,158
Page	4,297	60.20%	2,607	36.52%	161	2.26%	27	0.38%	41	0.57%	5	0.07%	1,690	23.68%	7,138
Patrick	3,436	56.12%	2,382	38.90%	105	1.71%	154	2.52%	35	0.57%	11	0.18%	1,054	17.22%	6,123
Petersburg	5,001	37.67%	7,931	59.73%	254	1.91%	21	0.16%	63	0.47%	7	0.05%	-2,930	-22.06%	13,277
Pittsylvania	12,022	59.28%	7,653	37.74%	250	1.23%	275	1.36%	54	0.27%	26	0.13%	4,369	21.54%	20,280
Poquoson	2,338	68.78%	877	25.80%	158	4.65%	5	0.15%	21	0.62%	0	0.00%	1,461	42.98%	3,399
Portsmouth	13,660	38.00%	20,900	58.14%	1,124	3.13%	79	0.22%	171	0.48%	15	0.04%	-7,240	-20.14%	35,949
Powhatan	2,933	64.18%	1,484	32.47%	98	2.14%	9	0.20%	39	0.85%	7	0.15%	1,449	31.71%	4,570
Prince Edward	2,774	49.55%	2,553	45.61%	137	2.45%	82	1.46%	41	0.73%	11	0.20%	221	3.94%	5,598
Prince George	3,389	57.56%	2,310	39.23%	130	2.21%	12	0.20%	40	0.68%	7	0.12%	1,079	18.33%	5,888
Prince William	23,061	58.95%	12,787	32.69%	2,676	6.84%	226	0.58%	313	0.80%	56	0.14%	10,274	26.26%	39,119
Pulaski	5,747	47.73%	5,769	47.92%	343	2.85%	92	0.76%	81	0.67%	8	0.07%	-22	-0.19%	12,040
Radford	1,964	44.01%	2,225	49.85%	233	5.22%	18	0.40%	21	0.47%	2	0.04%	-261	-5.84%	4,463
Rappahannock	1,179	49.81%	1,055	44.57%	99	4.18%	11	0.46%	21	0.89%	2	0.08%	124	5.24%	2,367
Richmond	1,567	62.81%	854	34.23%	49	1.96%	8	0.32%	14	0.56%	3	0.12%	713	28.58%	2,495
Richmond City	34,629	39.76%	47,975	55.08%	3,502	4.02%	330	0.38%	625	0.72%	45	0.05%	-13,346	-15.32%	87,106
Roanoke	17,182	55.76%	12,114	39.31%	1,286	4.17%	45	0.15%	180	0.58%	7	0.02%	5,068	16.45%	30,814
Roanoke City	15,164	43.39%	18,139	51.91%	1,350	3.86%	75	0.21%	207	0.59%	11	0.03%	-2,975	-8.52%	34,946
Rockbridge	2,784	49.04%	2,475	43.60%	296	5.21%	62	1.09%	54	0.95%	6	0.11%	309	5.44%	5,677
Rockingham	11,397	63.82%	5,294	29.64%	771	4.32%	233	1.30%	143	0.80%	21	0.12%	6,103	34.18%	17,859
Russell	4,778	43.94%	5,764	53.01%	125	1.15%	159	1.46%	38	0.35%	10	0.09%	-986	-9.07%	10,874
Salem	4,862	51.78%	4,091	43.57%	359	3.82%	17	0.18%	50	0.53%	10	0.11%	771	8.21%	9,389
Scott	4,744	50.54%	4,314	45.96%	153	1.63%	145	1.54%	27	0.29%	4	0.04%	430	4.58%	9,387
Shenandoah	7,517	67.10%	3,137	28.00%	385	3.44%	59	0.53%	95	0.85%	10	0.09%	4,380	39.10%	11,203
Smyth	6,033	50.86%	5,335	44.98%	224	1.89%	190	1.60%	64	0.54%	15	0.13%	698	5.88%	11,861
South Boston	1,615	60.97%	971	36.66%	51	1.93%	5	0.19%	6	0.23%	1	0.04%	644	24.31%	2,649
Southampton	2,997	45.50%	3,347	50.81%	163	2.47%	24	0.36%	49	0.74%	7	0.11%	-350	-5.31%	6,587
Spotsylvania	5,385	53.82%	4,039	40.37%	464	4.64%	29	0.29%	72	0.72%	16	0.16%	1,346	13.45%	10,005
Stafford	7,106	58.85%	4,211	34.87%	623	5.16%	28	0.23%	100	0.83%	7	0.06%	2,895	23.98%	12,075
Staunton	4,819	60.79%	2,658	33.53%	311	3.92%	89	1.12%	42	0.53%	8	0.10%	2,161	27.26%	7,927
Suffolk	7,179	42.82%	9,064	54.07%	360	2.15%	56	0.33%	98	0.58%	8	0.05%	-1,885	-11.25%	16,765
Surry	962	34.10%	1,756	62.25%	63	2.23%	9	0.32%	24	0.85%	7	0.25%	-794	-28.15%	2,821
Sussex	1,664	38.94%	2,447	57.27%	86	2.01%	31	0.73%	26	0.61%	19	0.44%	-783	-18.33%	4,273
Tazewell	7,021	48.67%	7,003	48.55%	225	1.56%	110	0.76%	61	0.42%	5	0.03%	18	0.12%	14,425
Virginia Beach	47,936	60.50%	24,895	31.42%	4,830	6.10%	690	0.87%	764	0.96%	120	0.15%	23,041	29.08%	79,235
Warren	3,861	55.79%	2,597	37.53%	297	4.29%	104	1.50%	46	0.66%	15	0.22%	1,264	18.26%	6,920
Washington	8,402	53.87%	6,390	40.97%	382	2.45%	320	2.05%	79	0.51%	24	0.15%	2,012	12.90%	15,597
Waynesboro	3,697	61.84%	1,926	32.22%	255	4.27%	72	1.20%	23	0.38%	5	0.08%	1,771	29.62%	5,978
Westmoreland	2,510	50.31%	2,271	45.52%	133	2.67%	44	0.88%	24	0.48%	7	0.14%	239	4.79%	4,989
Williamsburg	1,344	45.51%	1,199	40.60%	340	11.51%	41	1.39%	26	0.88%	3	0.10%	145	4.91%	2,953
Winchester	4,240	64.02%	2,006	30.29%	320	4.83%	18	0.27%	34	0.51%	5	0.08%	2,234	33.73%	6,623
Wise	5,767	43.89%	6,779	51.59%	258	1.96%	267	2.03%	50	0.38%	20	0.15%	-1,012	-7.70%	13,141
Wythe	4,758	54.28%	3,677	41.95%	164	1.87%	95	1.08%	61	0.70%	11	0.13%	1,081	12.33%	8,766
York	6,744	55.58%	4,532	37.35%	723	5.96%	36	0.30%	95	0.78%	3	0.02%	2,212	18.23%	12,133
Totals	989,609	53.03%	752,174	40.31%	95,418	5.11%	14,024	0.75%	12,821	0.69%	1,986	0.11%	237,435	12.72%	1,866,032

==== Counties and independent cities that flipped from Democratic to Republican ====
- Accomack
- Amelia
- Arlington
- Bedford
- Botetourt
- Charlotte
- Cumberland
- Fluvanna
- Gloucester
- Goochland
- Grayson
- Halifax
- King George
- New Kent
- Nottoway
- Patrick
- Prince George
- Rappahannock
- Rockbridge
- Scott
- Smyth
- Spotsylvania
- Stafford
- Tazewell
- Warren
- Westmoreland
- Alexandria
- Bristol
- Chesapeake
- Fredericksburg
- Galax
- Manassas Park
- Martinsville
- Newport News
- Salem

==== Counties and independent cities that flipped from Republican to Democratic ====
- Franklin
- Lexington

=== Results by congressional district ===
Reagan won 9 of 10 congressional districts. Carter and Reagan each won a district won by the other party.

District	Reagan	Carter	Representative
1st	50%	44%	Paul Trible
2nd	51%	41%	G. William Whitehurst
3rd	55%	40%	Thomas J. Bliley Jr.
4th	46%	51%	Robert Daniel
5th	56%	40%	Dan Daniel
6th	53%	42%	M. Caldwell Butler
7th	57%	36%	J. Kenneth Robinson
8th	56%	33%	Herbert Harris
8th	56%	33%	Stanford Parris
9th	49%	47%	William C. Wampler Jr.
10th	54%	34%	Joseph L. Fisher
10th	54%	34%	Frank Wolf

== Analysis ==
Virginia was ultimately won by Reagan with a substantially larger majority than predicted by the Roanoke Times a week before the poll. Reagan received 53.03 percent of the vote to Carter's 40.31 percent and Independent Representative John B. Anderson of Illinois’s 5.11 percent, which was still Anderson's second-best performance in a former Confederate state. The national election was ultimately won by Reagan with 50.75 percent of the vote. In this election, Virginia voted 2.98 points to the right of the nation at-large.

As of the 2020 presidential election, this is the last occasion when Franklin County, Isle of Wight County, Craig County, Louisa County and Pulaski County voted for a Democratic presidential candidate. It is also the last time Arlington County and Alexandria City voted for a Republican presidential candidate.

== Works cited ==
- Black, Earl; Black, Merle (1992). The Vital South: How Presidents Are Elected. Harvard University Press. ISBN 0674941306.
