= The Gazette (Colorado Springs) =

Newspaper published in Colorado Springs, Colorado

- The June 16, 2009, front page of The Gazette
- Type: Daily newspaper
- Format: Broadsheet
- Owner: Clarity Media Group
- Founder(s): William Jackson Palmer; J.E. Liller
- Editor: Vincent Bzdek
- Founded: 1872 (as Out West)
- Political alignment: Conservative
- Language: English
- Headquarters: 30 E. Pikes Peak Ave. Colorado Springs, CO 80903; United States
- Circulation: 93,300 Daily; 156,500 Sunday
- Website: gazette.com

The Gazette is a daily newspaper based in Colorado Springs, Colorado, United States. It has operated since 1872.

== History ==
=== The Gazette ===
==== Palmer era (1871-1896) ====
William J. Palmer, founder of Colorado Springs, freighted in a Gordon press and other equipment starting in July 1871 and had two story building constructed which would house the new town's first newspaper. On March 23, 1872, the first edition of a weekly tabloid called Out West was published, with Englishman J.E. Liller as editor. On January 4, 1873, The Colorado Springs Gazette and El Paso County News was launched. It replaced Out West, which continued on briefly as a monthly literary publication before ceasing.

In 1875, Liller died suddenly. The cause of death was an unintentional overdose of laudanum. Henry McAllister, Jr., succeeded him as Gazette editor. He stepped down after about a year and M.E. deCoursey replaced him. Printer James M. Bolton, Edward F. Draper and Ernest P. Stephenson, Palmer's brother-in-law, ran the paper for a brief period. In 1877, Benjamin W. Steele was named editor. On May 1, 1878, the Gazette was expanded into a six-day daily.

In 1882, Steele acquired the Gazette. He had a new four-story building constructed for the paper, which had its grand opening in March 1891. The project cost $75,000 and was located at 15 E. Pikes Peak Avenue. In November 1891, Steele died at age 41. Palmer assumed control and, upon learning the business was in debt, put is lawyer Judge H.A. Risley in charge. A year later Palmer named William A. Platt as editor and S.N. Francis as business manager. In 1894, Platt and Francis leased the paper for two years.

==== Stevens, Dodge and Nowels (1896-1946) ====
In 1896, Palmer sold the Gazette for $30,000 to an ownership group which consisted of Cornelius Vanderbilt as the principal owner; Henry Russell Wray as editor and William McKay Barbour as business manager. In 1900, Isaac N. Stevens acquired the paper. In February 1903, Stevens and his associate C.V. Barton sold the Gazette to Kurnal R. Babbit in order to buy The Pueblo Chieftain.

The paper was acquired by George Knox McCain in July 1903, followed by Clarence P. Dodge, owner of the Colorado Springs Telegraph, in October 1904. Dodge sold off the Telegraph two years later. In 1909, Dodge launched an evening edition called The Herald. At the same time the rival Evening Telegraph announced it would launch a morning edition. In 1910, The Herald was sold to and consolidated by the Telegraph. In 1922, managing editor Manitou Alfred Ege bought the Gazette from Dodge. In 1923, Ege sold the paper to a syndicate compromised of the owners of the Telegraph, local investors and a hotel owner. Clarence C. Hamlin was president and T. Ernest Nowels was editor.

=== The Telegraph (1891-1946) ===
In February 1891, Charles S. Sprague launched the Evening Telegraph, a daily newspaper in Colorado Springs, Colorado. That June, the paper merged with the Republic to form the Republic-Telegraph, with Sprague as editor and L.H. Goudy as business manager. H.H. Eddy acquired the paper in 1893 and reverted the name back to the Evening Telegraph. G.W. Temple was appointed business manager.

In 1897, the paper's management was reorganized with Sprague as president, H.S. Rogers as editor and Lewis W. Gaylord as business manager. At that time the Evening Telegraph became affiliated with the Free Silver Movement. In 1898, Sprague and fellow stockholder W.S. Stratton sold their interests to Gaylord. In October 1901, a man struck Gaylord in the face with a hammer in an attempt to murder him over a dispute regarding power for an automobile. A month later, Gaylord sold the Evening Telegraph for $120,000. Clarence P. Dodge was the new owner and E. E. Rittenhouse was editor.

In 1904, Dodge acquired the Gazette, and in 1906 sold the Evening Telegraph to C.F. Yeager, Edward F. McKay and C.E. Perry. McKay left the paper later that year. In 1909, Yeager launched a morning edition of the Telegraph as the rival Gazette under Dodge launched an evening edition called The Herald. In 1910, the Evening Herald and Evening Telegraph merged under the new management of Clarence C. Hamlin to form the Herald-Telegraph. The named reverted back to the Telegraph after a few years. David Elliot was editor of the consolidated paper, until retiring from the firm in 1916. At that time T. Ernest Nowels became editor. In 1923, Hamlin and Nowels became part of a syndicate of investors which acquired the Gazette.

=== Merger ===
==== Hoiles family era (1946-2012) ====
In 1946, Raymond C. Hoiles and his company Freedom Newspapers acquired the Colorado Springs Gazette and the Colorado Springs Evening Telegraph. At that time Nowels retired and was succeed as publisher by Harry Hoiles. In January 1947, the two papers ceased publication after union printers at the Gazette and Telegraph went on strike in solidary with striking workers at the Clovis News-Journal. Soon union workers at the Marysville Appeal Democrat voted to walk out too in support of the Clovis employees. The paper resumed later at the end of the month with newly hired workers. At that time the morning edition was dropped and the evening and Sunday editions continued as Gazette-Telegraph.

That February, the striking Colorado workers launched a rival paper called the Colorado Springs Free Press. In 1970, the Free Press was renamed to the Colorado Springs Sun. In 1977, the Gazette-Telegraph relaunched its morning edition. In 1986, the Gazette-Telegraph bought the Sun for $30 million and absorbed it into the paper. At the time of closure the Sun had a daily circulation of 49,000. In 1987, the paper's afternoon edition was discontinued. In 1990, Dava Curtin, a writer at the paper, won a Pulitzer Prize for Feature Writing. In 1997, the paper was renamed to The Gazette.

==== Clarity Media (2012-present) ====
In 2012, Freedom Communications sold Colorado Springs Gazette to Clarity Media Group, a subsidiary of The Anschutz Corporation. In 2014, Gazette reporter David Philipps won the Pulitzer Prize for National Reporting. On 2020, The Gazette launched The Denver Gazette, an online newspaper whose editorial pages lean conservative.

== Santa Claus incident ==
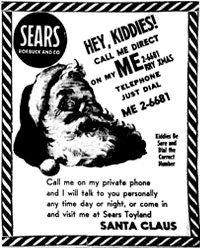
1955 Sears ad in the Colorado Springs Gazette-Telegraph with the misprinted telephone number that led to the NORAD Tracks Santa Program

An ad by a Colorado Springs-based Sears store in the Colorado Springs Gazette-Telegraph in December 1955 with a misprinted telephone number to call Santa Claus sparked numerous Christmas Eve telephone calls by children on December 24, 1955, to the Continental Air Defense Command Operations Center in Colorado Springs, asking about Santa Claus, and led to the current NORAD Tracks Santa program.

== See also ==
- Chuck Asay
- Robert H. Jackson (photographer)
- Wayne Laugesen
- Al Lewis
