= Appeal-Democrat =

Newspaper in Marysville, California, US

- Type: Daily newspaper
- Format: Broadsheet
- Owner: Horizon Publications
- Founder(s): G. W. Bloor; W. B. Michels
- Publisher: Stefan Sabich
- Founded: 1860
- Language: English
- Headquarters: Marysville, California, U.S.
- Sister newspapers: Colusa County Sun-Herald; Corning Observer; Glenn County Transcript
- OCLC number: 27480879
- Website: appeal-democrat.com

The Appeal-Democrat is a broadsheet newspaper published five days a week in Marysville, California, United States and covering Yuba and Sutter counties. The paper also is sold in Colusa County to the west and Butte County to the north.

There is an unproven claim Mark Twain wrote for the paper and a desk at a former office belonged to the famous writer, although there is no supporting evidence and this is considered a myth.

== History ==
=== Marysville Appeal ===
The first issue of the Marysville Appeal was published on January 23, 1860. W. B. Michels was editor and the owner was G. W. Bloor. Six months later B. F. Avery bought the paper and switched it from independent to a Republican affiliation. In October 1860, the Appeal absorbed another paper called the Daily National Democrat.

C. D. Dawson became the sole proprietor of the Appeal after Bloor at some point. In 1885, he sold it to A. S. Smith, who sold his interests two years later. D. E. Knight was the next owner, followed by F. W. Johnson. In 1905, Johnson sold the Appeal to Colonel E. A. Forbes for $20,000. Following his death, the paper was sold in 1921 to Victor. M. Cassidy. Two years later Cassidy sold the paper in 1923 to James Cremin.

=== Marysville Democrat ===
On 6, 1884, the first issue of the Marysville Evening Democrat was published. It was founded by Rev. Milton McWhorter. McWhorter had previously edited the Willows Advocate in Colusa County and purchased the physical assets of the defunct Red Bluff newspaper, The Democrat, to start his new paper in Yuba City. Around that time there was a fight between local farmers and miners over water rights. In an article published in 1886, McWhorter made accusations against T. G. Robinson of Sacramento, a deputy with the United States Marshals Service who was in charge of serving injunctions on those guilty of bootleg Hydraulic mining. The article claimed Robinson was secretly working for the miners as a spy and that the married man with children was patronizing a house of prostitution in Dutch Flat. In response Robinson threatened McWhorter. One day, McWhorter traveled to the state capital and Robinson confronted him outside the State House hotel. The two fought and McWhorter shot Robinson with a revolver in self-defense. Robinson later died from the gunshot wound and a jury in 1889 found McWhorter not guilty.

In 1907, J. M. Cremin purchased the Democrat. In 1916, W. S. O'Brien sold the paper to Arthur W. Gluckman, who published the paper for nearly a decade until selling it in 1925 to Fred W. McKechnie.

=== Marysville Appeal-Democrat ===
In August 1927, Eugene McLain merged his Marysville Democrat with the Marysville Appeal, owned by V. M. Cassidy and Alvin Weis. The first edition of the newly formed Marysville Appeal-Democrat was published on Sept. 1, 1927. In 1931, a company owned by Marysville businessmen sold the paper to Horace E. Thomas and S. J. Pickens. In 1943, Thomas sold the paper to George E. Payne for $250,000, and then resold it three years later in 1946 to R.C. Hoiles for over $300,000.

Hoiles went on to build Freedom Communications, a newspaper chain around the Santa Ana paper that became the Orange County Register. After the sale, he placed his son-in-law Robert C. Hardie in charge of the Appeal-Democrat as its publisher. In 1947, unionized workers at the paper staged a walk out in solidarity with striking workers at the Colorado Springs Gazette-Telegraph. Hardie directed the paper for 55 years, as circulation rose from about 7,500 to more than 20,000. Even as residents and businesses gradually shifted west from Marysville to nearby Yuba City, Hardie kept the Appeal-Democrat in its longtime home, twice acquiring new headquarters there (in 1950 and 1986).

In 2013, Freedom sold the Appeal-Democrat to Vista California, a subsidiary of Horizon Publications. At that time, it had a daily circulation of approximately 16,300. In 2020, the paper reduced publication to five days a week; circulation fell to 4,500 during the 2020s. As of 2024 the Appeal-Democrat has four reporters; Robert Summa became the editor in 2021 and resigned in 2024. Stefan Sabich has been the publisher since 2023.
