= WDJQ =

Commercial FM radio station in Ohio, US

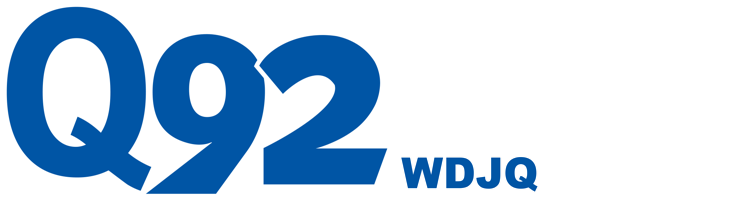
- Alliance, Ohio; United States
- Broadcast area: Canton metropolitan area
- Frequency: 92.5 MHz
- Branding: Q92

Programming
- Format: Top 40 (CHR)

Ownership
- Owner: D.A. Peterson, Inc.
- Sister stations: WDPN

History
- First air date: 1947 (as WFAH at 101.7)
- Former call signs: WFAH (1947–1953); WFAH-FM (1953–1980); WDJQ (1980–1992); WZKL (1992–2008)
- Former frequencies: 101.7 MHz (1947–1968)
- Call sign meaning: (husband and wife) Don and Josephine Peterson or: (son and daughter) Don Jr. and Jill Peterson

Technical information
- Facility ID: 14914
- Class: B
- ERP: 50,000 watts
- HAAT: 152 meters (499 ft)
- Transmitter coordinates: 40°47′24.00″N 81°6′26.00″W

Links
- Webcast: Listen Live
- Website: q92radio.com

WDJQ (92.5 MHz, "Q92") is a commercial FM radio station licensed to Alliance, Ohio, and serving the Canton metropolitan area. WDJQ broadcasts a Top 40/CHR radio format and is owned by the family company of Don Peterson, the former publisher of The Alliance Review newspaper. The Peterson Family also owns WDPN 1310 AM.

WDJQ has an effective radiated power (ERP) of 50,000 watts. The transmitter is off Whitacre Avenue in Minerva, Ohio.

== History ==
The station originally signed on as WFAH on 101.7 MHz in 1947. One of the oldest established FM stations in the entire region. The owners in 1953 added an AM station, 1310 WFAH (now WDPN). The FM station's call sign was modified to WFAH-FM with the launch of the AM station. Both stations were founded by Arthur Hoiles, with the call letters as a tribute to his father, Frank Austin Hoiles (FAH).

WFAH-FM moved to 92.5 in 1968 upon the establishment of WJER-FM Dover, Ohio on 101.7. The 92.5 spot on the dial had been the home of WAND-FM Canton from 1948-early 1950s, when the owners gave up the station license due to financial problems. WFAH-FM switched to a Top 40 (CHR) format on January 1, 1980. The call letters were switched to WDJQ. The call sign was selected because the names of the station owners began with the letters D and J (Don and Josephine (Hoiles) Peterson) as did their children (Don Jr. and Jill). The "Q" rhymed with the dial position 92, hence the "Q92" moniker. The station at the time also went with a secondary branding "Hitradio 92". In 1990, the station began leaning towards hot adult contemporary, retaining the "Q92" name as its primary branding, but also went with a secondary branding "92.5 DJQ".

In the late 1980s, the station was involved in a ratings controversy. Pittsburgh station 92.9 WLTJ sued Arbitron in January 1992 claiming that listeners who said they were listening to "92 FM" were credited to WDJQ incorrectly due to overlap in the markets as defined by Arbitron. The WLTJ management saw an unusual number of listeners to WDJQ closer to Pittsburgh and believed those people were actually tuning in WLTJ.

WDJQ became WZKL on March 13, 1992. As WZKL, the station played oldies as "Kool 92" and later "Oldies 92.5", then returned to hot adult contemporary as "Z-92.5 - Today's Music For All People" in January 2000. The station returned to Top 40 (CHR) back with its original "Q92" branding in September 2002, although there was no "Q" in the station's call letters. Attempts to reclaim WDJQ were initially unsuccessful. But on February 29, 2008, it was announced that the radio station had successfully obtained the callsign WDJQ, which took effect March 7, 2008.

== Former airstaff ==
The DeLuca Show, which ran weekdays from 5:30-10:00am, included host Pat DeLuca (once the station night jock), co-host Charlotte DiFranco, and producer Jason 'Virgil' Pantea. On February 2, 2012, the show went on hiatus pending contractual resolutions. On February 6, 2012, it was announced no agreement with management was made and The DeLuca Show was off the air permanently on WDJQ. After the expiration of a non-compete clause, DeLuca returned to the air in August 2013 on 94.1 WHBC-FM alongside Kathy Vogel, who co-hosted the morning show at WDJQ (then WZKL) before DeLuca.

Other former staff members include John Stewart (later at WONE in Akron), Kathy Vogel (later at WNWV in Cleveland, now at WONE), Eric Bradley, Liz Custer, Jim Steele, Tim Richards (now Morning Host at WDOK in Cleveland), Joe Slider, Robbie Mack (now Program Director and Afternoon Host at WJFX in Fort Wayne, IN), Raven (now Afternoon Host at KHKS in Dallas), David Michaels (who spent over 12 years at the station when it was Q92/KOOL92/WZKL/The New Q92), Mark Nolan, who went on to do weather for WKYC-TV in Cleveland and currently serves as the morning host on WMJI, and the late Jim Chenot, who was at WAPS from 2002 until his death in November 2016.
