= The Twisted Sisterhood =

Non-fiction book by Kelly Valen

The twisted sisterhood: unraveling the dark legacy of female friendships
- First edition
- Author: Kelly Valen
- Subject: Female friendships
- Genre: Non-fiction
- Publisher: Random House/Ballantine Books
- Publication date: 2010
- ISBN: 9780345520517
- Dewey Decimal: 302.3/4/082
- LC Class: 2010033478

The Twisted Sisterhood: Unraveling the Dark Legacy of Female Friendships is a non-fiction book by essayist and attorney Kelly Valen published by Random House/Ballantine Books on October 26, 2010.

The book is based on the author's December 2007 article and includes the results of a women's relationships survey the author conducted with 3000 women, studies and insights from experts in the fields of sociology, psychology, and neuroscience, and elements of humor, memoir and popular culture.

== Reception ==
Pamela Paul wrote for The New York Times that the survey Valen used in the book was misguided, writing "Rather than setting a time frame, Valen asks if women have ever suffered because of jealousy, manipulation or ridicule," instead of just within the past 3–6 months, later stating that "casting blame gender-wide is a stretch". Michelle Wiener, writing for The Alliance Review, praised the book, writing that the book is "well-researched" and "earnest". Ashley Sayeau at The Washington Post has mixed feelings about the book, stating that the book is "moving" but dismisses sexism as the explanation for female infighting.
