= WDPN =

WDPN may refer to:

- WDPN (AM), a radio station (1310 AM) licensed to Alliance, Ohio, United States
- WDPN-TV, a television station (channel 2) licensed to Wilmington, Delaware, United States
