= The Tustin News =

- Type: Weekly newspaper
- Format: Tabloid
- Founder: Timothy Brownhill
- Publisher: OC Register
- Founded: November 1922; 103 years ago
- Ceased publication: 2018
- City: Tustin, California
- ISSN: 0892-6441
- OCLC number: 15307712
- Website: www.ocregister.com/sections/city-pages/tustin/

The Tustin News was a newspaper covering the community of Tustin, California, from 1922 to 2018.

== History ==
In November 1922, Timothy Brownhill published the first edition of the weekly Tustin News in Tustin California. It was acquired by Rev. John Winterbourne in June 1923, Frank H. Fowler in February 1925, and Dr. C.D. Williamson in March 1930. A month later the News was sold to Winterbourne's sons, Dale and John Jr.

After selling the News, Fowler purchased another paper in Orange County called the Yorba Linda Star. Fowler returned to the News in September 1932. Clyde Simmons was put in charge in June 1937 so Fowler could focus his attention on Costa Mesa Globe.

After a few years his wife Gretchen A. Simmons replaced her husband as publisher. The News was taken over by C.W. Mast in August 1944, Edward N. Reed Jr. and Raymond L. Baker in July 1946. Fowler returned as publisher for a third time in March 1947. Harry Young was then named editor, and give an option to buy the business.

However, the paper was soon acquired by James W. Quinn later that year, followed by R. Robert Evans in April 1955, and William A. and Lucille Moses on July 25, 1956. Fowler, sometimes called the "dean of country newspapermen in Southern California", died in 1961. The Moses family retained ownership of the News for 39 years. The couple sold the paper in 1995 to Freedom Newspapers, owner of the OC Register. In 2018, the Register merged the News into the Irvine World News.
