= The Eastern New Mexico News =

Newspaper in Clovis, New Mexico

- Type: Daily newspaper
- Format: Broadsheet
- Owner: Clovis Media Inc.
- Founder: Arthur E. Curren
- Founded: 1907
- Headquarters: Clovis, New Mexico
- Sister newspapers: Quay County Sun
- Website: easternnewmexiconews.com

The Eastern New Mexico News is a daily broadsheet newspaper published in Clovis in Curry County, New Mexico. It was formed in 2016 by the merger of the Clovis News Journal and the Portales News-Tribune. Owner Clovis Media acquired both papers from Freedom Communications in 2012.

== History ==
On May 1, 1907, Arthur E. Curren published the first edition of the Clovis News in Clovis, Arizona. The newspaper was Republican affiliated and its motto was "Home First, County Next, and the World Last." Part of his salutatory read: "I do not come before you with any axes to grind nor enemies to punish, but expressly with the sole purpose in view of publishing a news medium that will be a credit to Clovis and Roosevelt County." The News was printed on hand press and its first subscribers were mostly railroad construction workers and surveyors, with some local ranchers.

In 1909, the News was briefly suspended during "the dull summer season." During that break, Thomas J. Mabry founded a rival paper called the Clovis Journal. In 1910, a fire destroyed the News' printing plant. In 1911, Mabry, then age 26, became the youngest person at that time elected to the New Mexico Senate. H.A. Armstrong then replaced Mabry as editor. In 1912, Mabry almost established another paper in town called the Clovis Call until he bought out W.D. McBee, and then resumed Journal editorship.

Due to financial difficulties, the First Nation Bank of Clovis took control of the Journal from Mabry in 1914 and appointed S.A. Jones as editor. Mabry attempted to reacquire the paper, but instead, in 1915, the bank sold the Journal to A.L. Dillon. Mabry then left the news business and went on to serve as governor and as a state supreme court justice, making him the first to serve in all three branches of government in New Mexico. In 1916, Curren sold the News to Clyde C. Buckingham, who later that year sold it to Edward L. Manson. In 1917, Dillon sold the Journal to Edmund Earnest Hull. In 1921, Curren founded the Clovis Herald, but closed it after a year.

In February 1929, Mack Stanton purchased the News from Manson and the Journal from Hull. That April, the two weekly papers were merged to form a daily called the Clovis News Journal. The Nunn-Warren Publishing Co. acquired the paper from Stanton at the end of the year. J.L. Nunn was president of the company which also published the Roswell Morning Dispatch and Carlsbad Current-Argus. In 1930, former Journal publisher Hull died. In 1931, a new company led by George H. Hill and Nunn's son Gilmore N. Nunn was formed to operate the three New Mexican papers, along with the Raton Range in Texas.

In 1934, Stanton reacquired the News Journal. In 1935, Stanton sold the paper to Raymond C. Hoiles, owner of the Santa Ana Daily Register. In 1938, Stanton died. In 1947, publisher Richard Hindley abruptly resigned due to personal reasons after a decade at the paper. Ralph N. Julliard was then appointed as his successor. Holies founded Freedom Communications, which in 1997 purchased the Portales News-Tribune and Quay County Sun in Tucumcari from Southern Newspapers Inc., of Houston. In 2012, Freedom sold its three New Mexican papers to Clovis Media Inc. In 2016, the News Journal and News-Tribune were merged to form The Eastern New Mexico News.
