= WDPN (AM) =

Radio station in Alliance, Ohio

- Alliance, Ohio; United States
- Frequency: 1310 (kHz)
- Branding: 1310 WDPN

Programming
- Format: Classic hits
- Affiliations: ABC News Radio

Ownership
- Owner: D.A. Peterson, Inc.
- Sister stations: WDJQ

History
- First air date: September 2, 1953; 72 years ago (as WFAH)
- Former call signs: WFAH (1953–1990)
- Call sign meaning: Don Peterson

Technical information
- Licensing authority: FCC
- Facility ID: 14913
- Class: B
- Power: 1,000 watts daytime; 480 watts nighttime
- Transmitter coordinates: 40°55′34″N 81°07′41″W

Links
- Public license information: Public file; LMS
- Website: www.am1310wdpn.com

WDPN is an AM radio station in Alliance, Ohio, operating on 1310 kHz. The station airs a classic hits format. It is owned by the family company of Don Peterson who is the former publisher of The Alliance Review, and is co-owned with FM station WDJQ.

The station first signed on the air in 1953 as WFAH, originally owned by The Review Publishing Co., with D.A. Peterson as general manager. On September 1, 1990, it became WDPN.
