= Levi L. Lamborn =

American politician and physician (1829–1910)

- Born: Levi Leslie Lamborn; October 10, 1829; Chester County, Pennsylvania, U.S.
- Died: June 14, 1910 (aged 80); Alliance, Ohio, U.S.
- Education: Western Reserve College (MD)
- Occupations: Politician; physician; horticulturalist
- Spouse: Maria Grant (m. 1851; died 1905)
- Children: 6

Levi Leslie Lamborn (October 10, 1829 – June 14, 1910) was an Ohio medical doctor, horticulturalist, and politician.

== Early life ==
Levi Leslie Lamborn was born on October 10, 1829, in Chester County, Pennsylvania, to Townsend Lamborn and Anna (Clayton) Lamborn. Townsend Lamborn was involved in local politics and once ran for governor as the nominee of the Anti-Masonic party. The Lamborns were a Quaker family, and Levi was educated in schools of that sect. The family moved to Ohio when Lamborn was a boy and settled in Salem, Ohio. Lamborn decided at the age of fifteen to pursue a career in medicine. After studying under Dr. Solomon Sleeve of Damascus, Ohio, he moved to Philadelphia for additional training, then returned to Ohio to attend lectures at Western Reserve College (now Case Western Reserve University) in Cleveland. He graduated from there in 1848 with a Doctor of Medicine.

== Career ==
After graduating, Lamborn moved to Mount Union and later relocated to Alliance, Ohio, and set up a medical practice. In 1854, he founded the Alliance Ledger, the town's first newspaper, but sold it a few months later. He was also its editor. Lamborn became involved in local politics, running for a seat in the Ohio House of Representatives as a Free Soil candidate in 1858. He was unsuccessful, but was appointed the clerk of the house from 1859 to 1861.

Around 1865, Lamborn formed a real estate practice with Elisha Teeters and Hugh Blakley called Teeters, Lamborn and Company. Lamborn and his associates helped bring Marchand & Morgan Steam Hammer Works of Pittsburgh (later Morgan Engineering Company) to Alliance.

In 1866, he retired from the practice of medicine, but remained active in politics. In 1874, Lamborn ran for a state senate seat, this time as a Democrat. He was not elected, but ran again in 1876, this time for the United States House seat for Ohio's 17th congressional district. Lamborn's opponent in 1876 was his friend William McKinley, the future president, who defeated Lamborn by some 3300 votes.

In 1874, Lamborn founded a bank with several associates, including E. W. Gray. He also became a trustee of the State Asylum for the Deaf and Dumb. Although he no longer ran for office after 1876, Lamborn remained a popular speaker on behalf of Democratic candidates in the area. Lamborn was a serious student of horticulture, specifically dealing with breeding carnations. He grew some of the first carnations in the United States in 1866. Before a debate in his 1876 race against McKinley, he gave his opponent a red carnation; after McKinley won, he adopted the flower as a good-luck token for the rest of his career in politics, keeping a vase of them in the White House. In 1892, Lamborn published a book on the subject, "American Carnation Culture".

== Personal life ==
Lamborn married Maria Grant in June 1851. His wife was the niece of Ulysses S. Grant. She died in 1905. They would have six children, all of whom were given the initials L.L.L.

In 1856, Lamborn built a brick and stone house at the northwest corner of Main Street and Union Avenue in Alliance. It was called the Lamborn house. In 1865, Lamborn purchased 250 acres (100 ha) of land near Alliance. He died on June 14, 1910, in Alliance.

== Legacy ==
The carnation that McKinley adopted from Lamborn would become the state flower of Ohio because of its association to McKinley. In the late 1950s, the city of Alliance was named the "Carnation City".

== Sources ==
- Bara, Craig; Crist, Lyle (1998). Alliance (Images of America series). Charleston, South Carolina: Arcadia Publishing. ISBN 9780738562995.
- Goodman, Rebecca; Brunsman, Barrett J. (2005). This Day in Ohio History. Cincinnati, Ohio: Emmis Books. ISBN 9781578601912.
- Lamborn, Levi Leslie (1892). American Carnation Culture. (Dianthus caryophyllus semperflorens.): Its Classification, History, Propagation, Varieties, Care, culture, etc. Alliance, Ohio.
- Lamborn, Samuel (1894). The Genealogy of the Lamborn family: with Extracts from History, Biographies, Anecdotes, etc. Philadelphia, Pennsylvania: Press of M.L. Marion.
- Morgan, H. Wayne (2003). William McKinley and His America (revised ed.). Kent, Ohio: The Kent State University Press. ISBN 978-0-87338-765-1.
