= Orange County Register =

Daily newspaper in Orange County, California

- The January 1, 2013, front page of the Register
- Type: Daily newspaper
- Format: Broadsheet
- Owner(s): Southern California News Group (MediaNews Group)
- Publisher: Ron Hasse
- Editor: Frank Pine
- Founded: 1905; 121 years ago (as Santa Ana Daily Register)
- Language: English
- Headquarters: 1925 Main Street; Suite 225; Irvine, California 92614
- Circulation: 21,400 Average print circulation
- ISSN: 0886-4934
- OCLC number: 12199155
- Website: ocregister.com

The Orange County Register logo in 2007

The Orange County Register is a paid daily newspaper published in California. The Register, published in Orange County, California, is owned by the private equity firm Alden Global Capital via its Digital First Media News subsidiaries. It was founded as the Santa Ana Daily Evening in 1905 and owned by Freedom Communications from 1935 to 2016.

== History ==
=== Founding ===
In 1905, printers Frank Ormer and Fred Unholz moved from San Diego to Santa Ana and then gathered the support of around a dozen local investors to form the Register Publishing Co. The business published the Santa Ana Daily Evening that November. J. P. Baumgartner purchased a three-fourths interest in September 1906 from James McFadden, E.N. Smiley, E.S. Wallace, and others. Baumgartner was a well known local newspaper man, public speaker and editorial essayist who owned the Long Beach Press. Two decades later he sold the Register in 1927 to J. Frank Burke, who previously owned and co-founded the Elyria Chronicle Telegram in Ohio. Baumgartner walked away with $750,000, went into banking and helped establish a local bank.

Around 1928 a rival paper called the Santa Ana Times was founded by M.C. and D.E. Maloney. Burke acquired the Times in 1930 and absorbed it into the Register. It was rumored the transaction was the first step in a sale of the Register to Ira C. Copley. Another rival paper called The Santa Ana Journal was soon launched by the publishers of the Ventura County Star. It appeared the Star could buy the Register. Instead, Burke sold it in 1935 to Raymond C. Hoiles, who owned the Bucyrus Telegraph-Forum and co-owned The Alliance Review with his elder brother. He also previously owned two other Ohio newspapers (the Mansfield News and Lorain Times-Herald) until selling them a few years prior to Brush-Moore Newspapers. Burke and Hoiles both operated papers in Lorain County and became associated after Burke sold Hoiles the Bucyrus Telegraph-Forum.

=== Hoiles family ===
Hoiles shortened the paper's to the Santa Ana Register in 1939. He also made his son Clarence H. Holies a co-publisher. After the Pearl Harbor attack, R.C. Hoiles was one of the few newspaper publishers in the country to oppose the forced relocation and internment of Japanese Americans and Japanese residents away from the West Coast. Hoiles continued buying newspapers across the United States and in 1950 reorganized his holdings as Freedom Newspapers, Inc. In 1951, C.H. Holies was named president of the California Newspaper Publishers Association. In 1952, the Santa Ana paper was renamed to The Register. By 1957, Holies owed 11 papers with The Register as the largest with a circulation of 47,000. In 1959, the paper launched a morning edition and became the first paper on the West Coast to install Elgrama, an electronic photoengraver from Switzerland. Under Holies, the company and its newspapers embraced a Libertarian philosophy.

In 1970, Holies died at age 90. Throughout his life he was controversial figure who was anti-Socialist, opposed the United States' membership in the United Nations and wanted to abolish public schools, believing it be a form of compulsory taxation. He declined to endorse Dwight D. Eisenhower or Robert A. Taft, believing neither to be conservative enough. President Richard Nixon and Governor Ronald Reagan wished Holies a happy birthday right before his death. At that time the Freedom Newspaper chain was one of the largest in the nation, with a total circulation over 500,000. Clarence Holies was joined by his brother Harry H. Holies as co-publishers of the Register in 1975. At that time C.H. Holies was board chairman and H.H. Holies was company president. In 1979, R. David Threshie, Clarence's son-in-law, was named publisher. A year later N. Christian Anderson III was named editor and he ended the paper's practice of referring to public schools as "taxpayer-supported schools."

In 1985, the paper assumed the name The Orange County Register. In the same year it won its first Pulitzer Prize, for its photographic coverage of the 1984 Summer Olympics in Los Angeles. In 1989, the paper won another Pulitzers in beat reporting by Edward Humes on U.S. military problems with night-vision goggles. In 1990, the newspaper launched the 24-hour OCN news channel with news and feature stories about Orange County. In 1992, Freedom launched Excélsior, a Spanish-language weekly covering Orange County. About 35,000 copies would be freely distributed at retail and grocery stories in five cities. In 1996, the Register won a third Pulitzer for an investigation into Ricardo Asch's fertility clinics. In 1998, Threshie was promoted to company chairman and was succeeded as Register publisher by Anderson. At that time the paper had a daily circulation of 365,000. In 2001, the OCN news channel ceased.

=== Private equity ===
In March 2003, a majority of the Hoiles family voted to sell the company, which at that time included 25 newspapers and eight television stations. Freedom Communications was valued at $2 billion. That October, a majority interest in Freedom Communications was sold to a group of investors led by the Blackstone Group and Providence Equity Partners. Through a stock arrangement, the Hoiles family descendants retained control of the board. The private equity firms received a management fee off the company’s gross revenue. The family sold a 40% stake for $470 million, which allowed some members to cash out. In August 2006, the company launched Freedom launched The OC Post, a tabloid with shortened versions of Register stories as well as news articles from the Associated Press.

In September 2007, Terry Horne replaced Anderson as publisher. The paper also cut three dozen newsroom jobs. The OC Post also ceased publication. Freedom Orange County Information, the subsidiary that operated the Register and its sibling publications was absorbed into the larger company, saving an estimated $10 million annually. In June 2008, the Register began a one-month trial of outsourcing some layout and copy-editing work to India to save costs. In spring of 2009, Freedom Communications instituted furloughs for all employees nationwide, followed by a permanent 5% pay cut starting in July 2009. News reports in August 2009 indicated that Freedom Communications planned to file for bankruptcy and turn control of its publications, including The Orange County Register, over to its lenders. The Holies family lost control of the business upon exiting bankruptcy, succeeded by Wall Street investment firms, including Alden Global Capital.

On July 25, 2012, The Orange County Register and six other papers were purchased by 2100 Trust LLC. The papers continued to operate under the Freedom Communications name. That December, the Register changed its logo and branding, dropping "The" in favor of Orange County Register. A lawsuit was filed in October 2013 by the former owners of Freedom Communications against Aaron Kushner, principal of 2100 Trust, demanding that Kushner's company pay more than $17 million remaining on the sale. The Los Angeles Times wrote that Kushner, "a former greeting-card executive with no prior media experience," claimed that the prior owners had given him "inaccurate valuations for a host of crucial financial indicators" and that he faced "$62.3 million in unexpected financial liabilities as a result." On August 19, 2013, the Long Beach Register was launched as an edition of The Orange County Register serving the Long Beach, California, community. It was focused solely on community news, including city government, public and private education, local sports coverage, business and entertainment as an intended competitor to the Long Beach Press-Telegram. In addition, on January 20, 2014, The Press-Enterprise became an edition of The Orange County Register while maintaining coverage of the Inland Empire. That same month the company laid off 71 workers in Riverside and Santa Ana.

In March 2014, Excélsior launched a Southern California edition called Unidos en el Sur de California. On April 16, 2014, The Orange County Register launched the Los Angeles Register, "more a print play than a digital one" serving Los Angeles County. It was the first time since the Herald-Examiner folded on November 1, 1989, that a main competitor to the Los Angeles Times was launched, this time intended to be "as local as one edition can be for the entire county." Five months later, Kushner announced in a company memo that the Los Angeles Register was ending publication effective immediately. Kushner wrote that "pundits and local competitors" will be quick to call the effort a failure while he believes that "not taking bold steps toward growth" would have been the true failure. The Long Beach Register became a Sunday-only publication in June 2014, and ceased publication in December 2014. In October the Los Angeles Times sued the Register for failing to pay more than $2 million to the Times for delivery services for the now-defunct Register newspapers in Los Angeles and Long Beach. In March 2014, the Los Angeles County Superior Court granted the Times a $4.2 million writ of attachment to secure the ability of the Times to enforce a possible judgment in its favor.

=== Digital First Media ===
On March 10, 2015, Aaron Kushner and his partner, Eric Spitz, resigned from executive duties at the paper and Freedom Communications Inc. The company was rumored to be readying itself for a potential sale. Publisher Rich Mirman, a former Las Vegas casino executive who had invested in Freedom, was announced as the new president and chief executive.

On February 12, 2016, Freedom Communications announced that The Orange County Register and the Press-Enterprise along with its websites, community weeklies and the two Spanish-Language weeklies Excelsior in Orange County and La Prensa in the Inland Empire, were being placed in a "stalking horse" auction after the company declared bankrupt at the end of 2015. Both Digital First Media and Tribune Publishing were the bidders. The auction started on March 21 and was completed on March 31, 2016. The U.S. Department of Justice blocked the sale of Freedom Communications to Tribune Publishing because it would create a newspaper monopoly in both Orange and Riverside Counties. On March 21, 2016, Digital First Media acquired both The Orange County Register and the Press-Enterprise for $52.3 million in a U.S. Bankruptcy Court in Santa Ana. Los Angeles News Group was renamed Southern California News Group on March 31, 2016, once the sale of Freedom Communications to Digital First Media was completed. La Prensa in the Inland Empire and Impacto USA in Los Angeles were merged into Excélsior along with Unidos. Moving forward the Spanish-language weekly had three editions for each county. On Sept. 21, 2016, it was announced that the Register would move its headquarters to 2190 Towne Centre Place, Anaheim, and vacate its longtime home at 625 N. Grand Avenue, Santa Ana. The new headquarters opened April 24, 2017.

The Alliance for Audited Media reported in 2017 that the Register's circulation had dropped to 80,000 on weekdays and 180,000 on Sundays. As of 2024, circulation further dropped to 25,700, which includes all other newspapers in the Southern California News Group except the San Diego Union-Tribune, as they are all identified as editions of the Register.

== Editorial stances ==
The Register was notable for its generally libertarian-leaning editorial page. It generally supported free markets and social liberties, though at least some on the editorial board said they would not call it libertarian. Although it sometimes supported Republican politicians and positions, it was the largest newspaper in the country to have opposed the Iraq War from the beginning and opposed laws regulating issues such as prostitution and drug use. It was one of a handful of newspapers that opposed the internment of Japanese aliens and Japanese-Americans during World War II. It also opposed Proposition 8 in 2008, which proposed to define the word "marriage" in the California Constitution to mean between a man and a woman definitively. After the Digital First purchase of Freedom Communications, the Register's editorial page was merged with that of the Los Angeles Daily News and Digital First's other papers in the region to form a single editorial board for the Southern California News Group on regional and national issues.

== Controversies ==
In September 2009, a column written by Register sports columnist Mark Whicker caused controversy. In the column, Whicker wrote about various sporting events that had occurred over the preceding 18 years, and how they had been missed by Jaycee Dugard, a girl who had been kidnapped, raped, and forced to bear her kidnapper's children. Whicker ended his column with the line "Jaycee, you have left the yard." The column generated criticism in blogs such as The Huffington Post and Deadspin, who called it "the single worst piece of journalism ever committed on this page". Whicker later issued an apology to readers citing a “lapse of professionalism”.

== Other publications ==
In addition to publishing The Orange County Register, Southern California News Group publishes OC Family magazine, Coast magazine – until shutting down that magazine in 2020, and the following affiliated weeklies:

- Anaheim Bulletin of Anaheim
- Coastal Current (North and South editions) of Newport Beach
- North County News Tribune of Fullerton
- Irvine World News of Irvine
- Laguna Woods Globe of Laguna Woods
- Saddleback Valley News of Lake Forest/Mission Viejo
- The Wave of Huntington Beach

== Online content ==
On April 1, 2013, the Orange County Register began providing its online content through a metered paywall. Most online content requires a subscription, with the exception of local weather, traffic, Associated Press or non-Register articles, and a few select local news articles.

== See also ==
- OC Weekly
