= Haines House (Alliance, Ohio) =

Historic house in Ohio, United States

- U.S. National Register of Historic Places
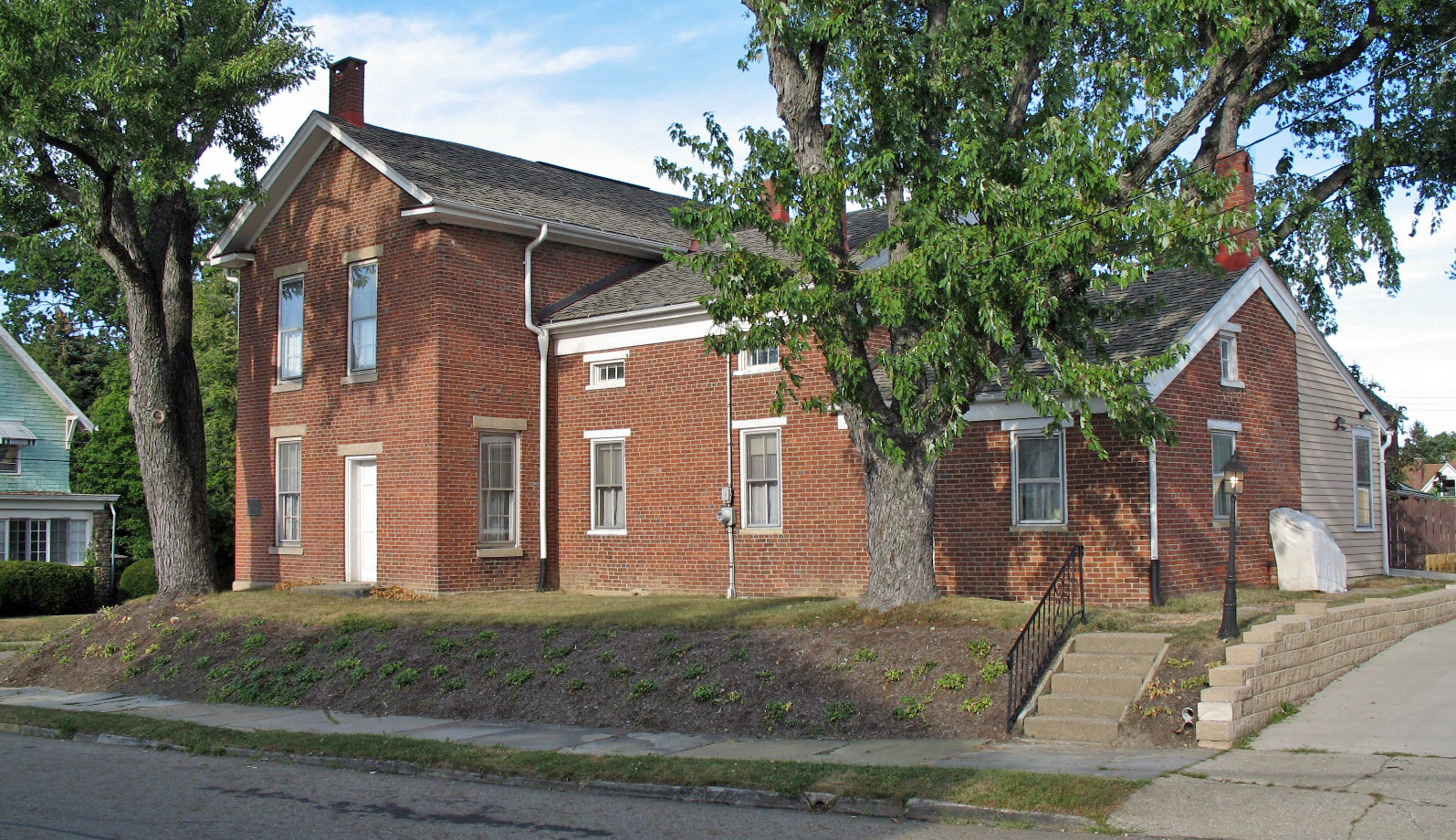
- Haines House in 2008

- Location within Ohio Location within the United States
- Location: 186 W. Market St., Alliance, Ohio
- Coordinates: 40°55′14.9″N 81°6′35″W
- Area: less than 1 acre (0.40 ha)
- Built: 1834
- Architect: John Grant
- Architectural style: Federal
- Restored by: Eric Johannesen
- NRHP reference No.: 74001623
- Added to NRHP: 30 July 1974

The Haines House is a historic house in Alliance, Ohio that was an Underground Railroad station.

== Description and history ==
The house is located at 186 W. Market Street. The architect was John Grant and the building was constructed between 1827-1842. The architectural style is Federal. It was placed on the National Register of Historic Places on July 30, 1974.

== History of the Home and Family ==
John and Nancy Grant were some of the earliest families to settle in Stark County, Ohio. Upon their settling in Stark County the couple purchased a grant of land of 160 acres in 1812. This land would make up a large portion of the west side of Alliance. The house was completed in stages beginning in 1827 and finalized in 1842. It was inherited in 1852 by Grant's son-in-law Jonathan Ridgeway Haines. Haines was married to Grant's daughter Sarah. The Haines had six children, one of whom fought in the civil war.

Haines and his wife would go on to operate the home as an underground railroad station. The home was located in a “hotbed of Abolition” since the area was known for underground railroad activity in the years prior to the civil war. Johnathan and Sarah along with their families were avid abolitionists and members of the Western Anti-Slavery Society of which Johnathan would later be elected the Vice President in 1860 . The Haines would often host meetings and famous abolitionists like Abby Kelley Foster and her husband on their 126-acre farm. The family would use their small attic to hide former slaves and provide shelter before moving them to Limaville or Marlboro then to Randolph.

The Haines would raise their children on the home and later in life would sell pieces of the property to sustain their life. Ridgeway Haines died in 1899 and Mrs. Haines in 1903. They are buried in Alliance City Cemetery.

After the Haines family passed the home was turned into two apartments. Over the years multiple repairs were made including electricity in 1921 and the addition of two bathrooms. In 1941 the home suffered a fire which left charred wood in the attic. The home was reduced in 1966 by an art professor at Mount Union College. Work began to restore the home to its original status and have it placed on the National Register of Historic Places.

== Today ==
The Home was purchased by the Alliance Area Preservation Society in August 2001 who continued the work to restore the home. Restorations are still ongoing but the Preservation Society has worked to recreate the historical home and get the atmosphere as accurate as possible. Today the home is used as a museum to educate on the history of Alliance and the underground railroad. The Museum provides accurate rooms that recreate what the home would have looked like for the Haines family. It also has several exhibits about the preservation work that the museum does. The museum also works to provide underground railroad re-enactments to create a hands-on experience. The Home has also been recognized by the National Park Service's Network.

== Layout ==
=== First Floor ===
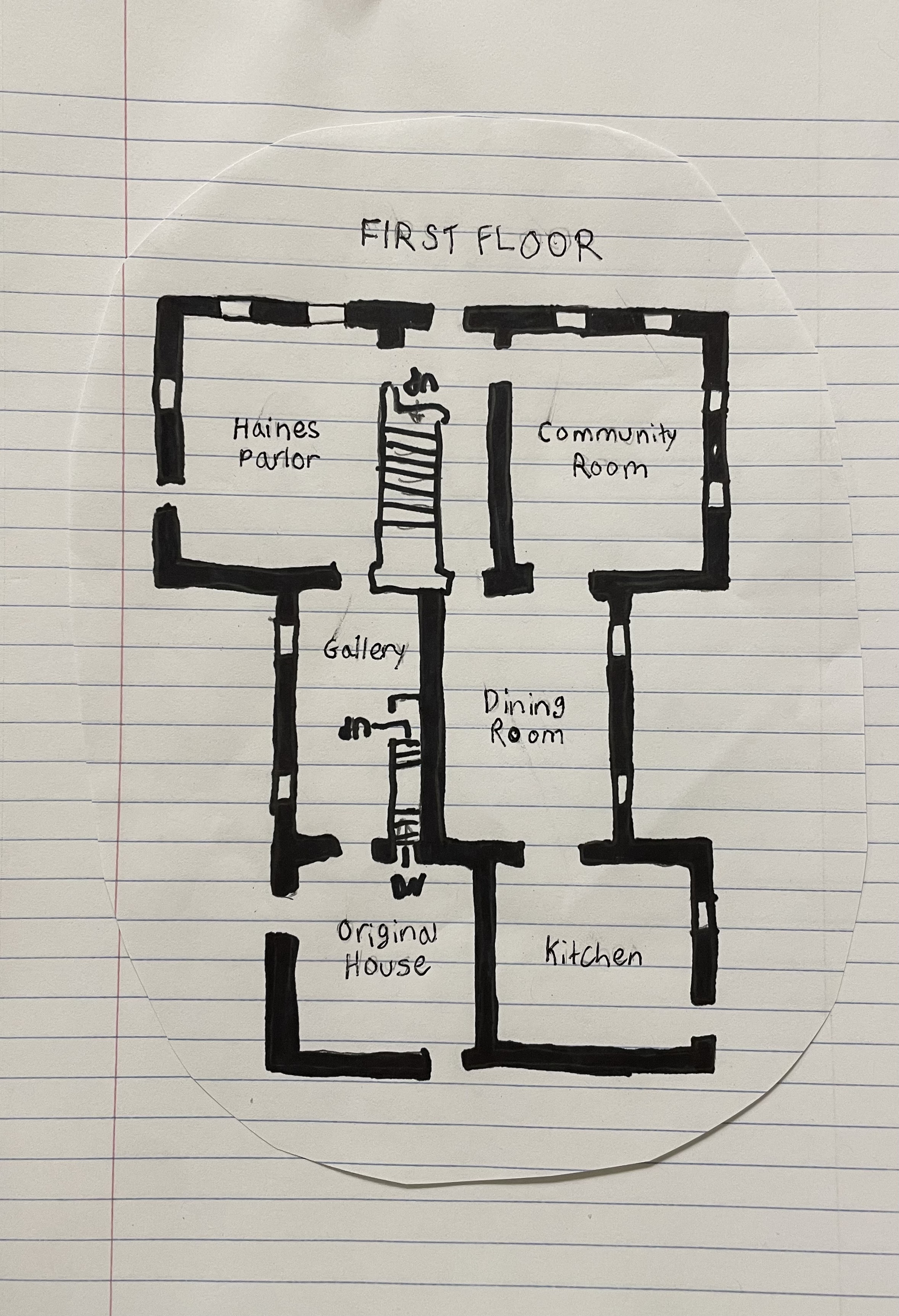
Drawing of the first floor of the Haines House

The first floor comprises 6 rooms and two sets of stairs. At the front of the home is the Haines Parlor which has been restored as a formal parlor of the 1870s. This room is filled with various antiques and restored, period accurate woodworking. Across from the Parlor is the Community Room. Formally known as the Evan and Suzanne Morris Community Room it was once the East Parlor. It is one of two rooms in the home with a fireplace. It is currently used for meetings and events.

Behind the Community Room is the dining room. This room is known for its multiple doors to let air during the summer. It is believed the room originally served as a work or sewing room. It is currently used to house exhibits. Connected to the dining room is the new kitchen that was originally the back porch. It was enclosed in 1910 when the home was divided into apartments. Connected to and across from the new kitchen is the original home or old kitchen. This section of the home was the first piece of the one-room home. It houses a loft for sleeping. In the original home the only piece of furniture that was owned by the Haines family is housed. In Between the main parlor and the original house is the Gallery.

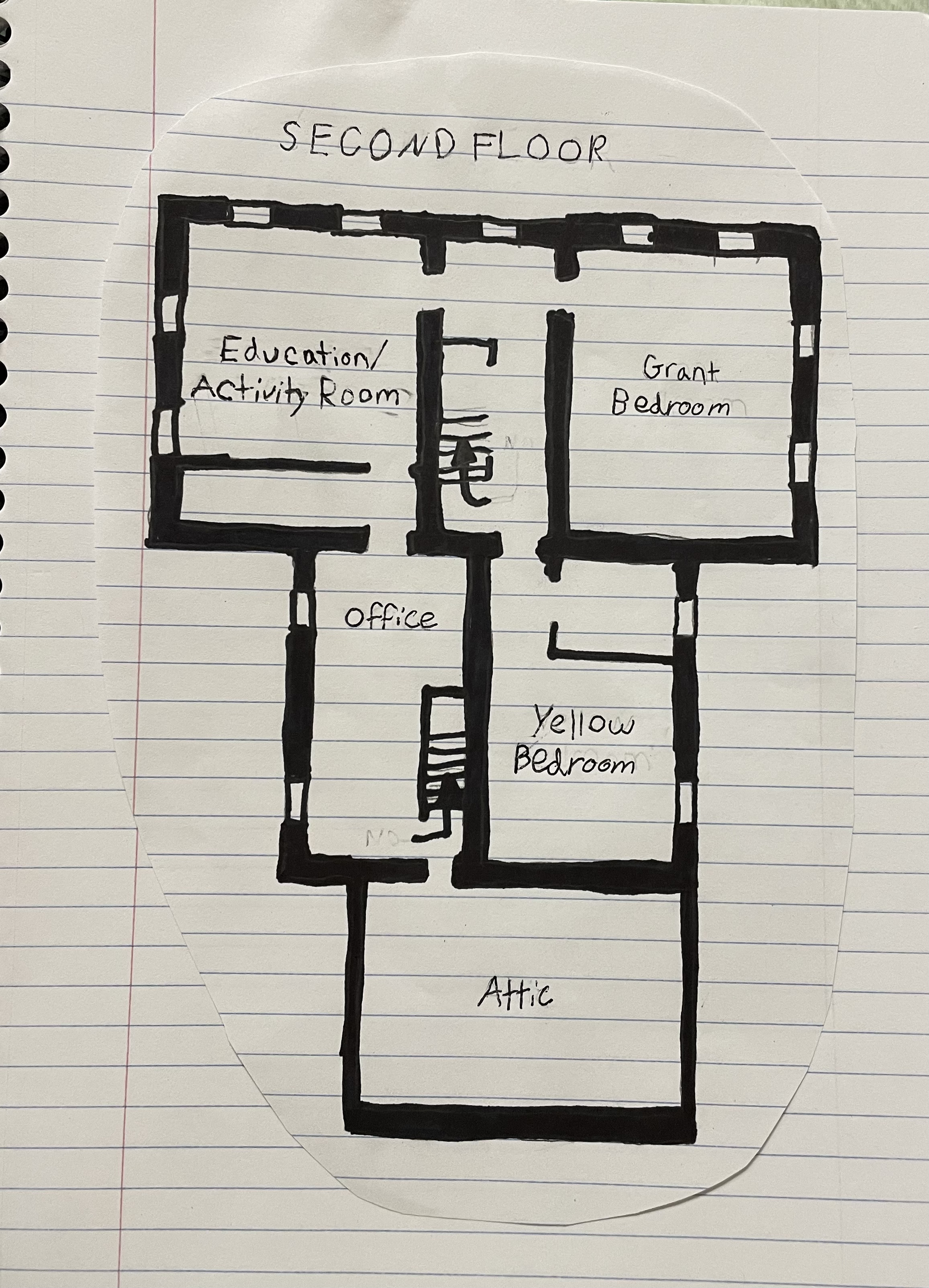
Drawing of the second floor

=== Second Floor ===
After walking up the steps and to the right is the Grant bedroom. Named for the original owner of the home John Grant and reflects mid-19th century bedrooms. The second floor also has a children's bedroom that was decorated to reflect what child's room might have looked like This room also contains a rope bed and straw tickling. Behind the children's room is the attic that was used to hide fugitive slaves while on the underground railroad. It was also used for storage. There is also an office that was a bedroom that had been decided into a nursery and bathroom. It is currently used as an office for the preservation society. The founder's preservation room is also on the second floor. It was once a fourth bedroom but currently houses education programs and exhibits about local preservation efforts. There is also a small research library for historic preservation.

== See also ==
- Slavery in the United States
- Alliance, Ohio
