= Desert Dispatch =

Newspaper in California

- Type: Daily newspaper
- Owner: Gannett
- Founder: T.G. Nicklin
- Founded: 1910
- Ceased publication: 2017
- Language: English
- Headquarters: Barstow, California
- Website: desertdispatch.com

The Desert Dispatch was a newspaper published in Barstow, California, from 1910 to 2017.

== History ==
On July 15, 1910, T.G. Nicklin published the first edition of the Barstow Printer. Nicklin sold the paper in 1912 to F.M. LaSage.

In 1933, R.E. Forbush started the Barstow Weekly Review. In October 1936, Caryl Krouser purchased the Barstow Printer from Lloyd E. Tiernan, who operated the paper for two decades. That November, Krouser and Forbush merged their papers to form the Barstow Printer-Review.

On July 3, 1958, Charles K. Dooley, owner of the Colton Courier, published the first edition of the Desert Dispatch in Barstow. In October 1958, Courier Enterprises, owned by Dooley, acquired the Barstow Printer-Review from Caryl Krouser and absorbed it into the Dispatch. In October 1959, the paper expanded print editions to five days a week. At that time it had a circulation of 30,000. A new press was installed in 1964.

In 1978, Dooley sold the paper to Thomson Newspapers, who traded it in 1995 to Freedom Communications. As of 2011, newspaper had a daily circulation of 3,259. In 2014, Freedom sold the Dispatch and Victorville Daily Press to New Media Investment Group. In 2017, the paper ceased.
