= Raymond C. Hoiles =

American journalist (1878–1970)

Raymond Cyrus Hoiles
- Born: November 24, 1878; Alliance, Ohio, U.S.
- Died: 31 October 1970 (aged 91)
- Occupation: Newspaper publisher

Raymond Cyrus "R.C." Hoiles (November 24, 1878 – October 31, 1970) was an American newspaper publisher. He was born in Alliance, Ohio, and started his career as a subscription solicitor in the local newspaper The Alliance Review. Hoiles and his brother bought the Santa Ana Daily Register in 1935, among other newspapers Hoiles became president of Freedom Newspapers in 1950, a position he held until his death in 1970.

Holies was posthumously inducted into the California Newspaper Hall of Fame in 1979.

== Biography ==
Hoiles was born on November 24, 1878, in Alliance, Ohio, into a middle-class family. His parents were Samuel Harrison Hoiles, a farmer, and his wife, Ann Ladd Hoiles. The family farm was located on the outskirts of the town, which had 4,000 inhabitants at that time.

Hoiles went to a school in town. In old age, he remarked that the most important thing he had learned there was "that the State, or a majority of citizens, had the right to use taxation to support the public school system". He once mockingly said of his education that "attending government schools … handicapped me in developing my moral and mental faculties. … [I]n short it retarded my education."

According to Carl Watner, Hoiles learned from his father at the time he graduated from high school that he should "never ask anybody to do something for him that he was not prepared to do himself". He later studied electrical engineering at Mt. Union College in Ohio, where he worked as a subscription solicitor for The Alliance Review, a newspaper edited by his elder brother.

In 1919, shortly after the end of World War I, Hoiles, together with his elder brother, sought to expand their media empire. The first newspaper they took possession of was the Lorain Times Herald, the second was the Mansfield News—Hoiles served as publisher for both of them. Believing that what the country needed were newspapers that "believe in moral principles and have enough courage to express these principles", Hoiles, then aged 56, purchased the Santa Ana Register, a daily newspaper for the Californian town of Santa Ana.

== Political views ==
Hoiles wanted to abolish public schooling, which he called "taxpayer supported schools", and advocated the secession of the United States from the United Nations. He opposed the presidential candidacies of Dwight D. Eisenhower and Robert A. Taft, finding their views not sufficiently libertarian. None of his newspapers endorsed any candidate for public office.

The Register was one of the few American newspapers that decried the internment of Japanese Americans during World War II.

In a 1964 interview with The New York Times, Hoiles described himself as a voluntaryist, stating that "government should exist only to try to protect the rights of every individual, not to redistribute the property, manipulate the economy, or establish a pattern of society."
