= North County News Tribune =

Former daily newspaper in Orange County, California

- Type: Weekly newspaper
- Owner: Digital First Media
- Founder: Edgar Johnson
- Founded: 1891
- Language: English
- City: Fullerton, California
- Country: United States
- Sister newspapers: The Orange County Register
- Website: ocregister.com

The North County News Tribune, formerly the Fullerton News Tribune, was once the oldest continuously published independent daily newspaper in Orange County, California. The paper was founded in 1891 and became a local edition of The Orange County Register in 1992. It is owned by Digital First Media.

== History ==
In 1891, Edgar Johnson founded the Weekly Tribune of Orange County. It initially had 300 subscribers. By 1914, the paper had expanded to five print editions a week and was named he Daily Tribune. In 1926, Johnson purchased the Fullerton News and merged it into his paper to form The Fullerton News Tribune. Soon after he signed up for the United Press wire service. In 1929, Johnson sold the News Tribune for $125,000 to W. Kee Maxwell, former publisher of the Daily Bloomington Bulletin.

In the early and middle part of the 20th century, the Fullerton News Tribune was one of the more modern California daily newspaper organizations; it was the first California newspaper to print with Linotype printing presses, and the first small city daily in Southern California to have leased a teletype news wire and a UPI photo wire service. In 1939, Edgar F. Elstrom purchased the Fullerton News Tribune. Elfstrom previously had worked as the secretary to newspaper magnate E.W. Scripps,

On December 28, 1973, Elfstrom retired and sold the paper to the Scripps-Howard Newspaper chain. In 1983, the newspaper cut nearly 25% of its editorial staff. It then also reduced daily coverage areas, and decreased its print editions to one day a week. Until it moved to a weekly publication schedule in 1985, The Daily News Tribune was Orange County's longest-running daily newspaper. In 1987, Community Media Enterprises acquired the paper. In 1992, The News Tribune was sold to Freedom Newspapers, owners of The Orange County Register. In 2012, the paper was expanded from a tabloid to a 24-page broadsheet.
