= Herbert Harris =

American politician (1926–2014)

Herbert E. Harris
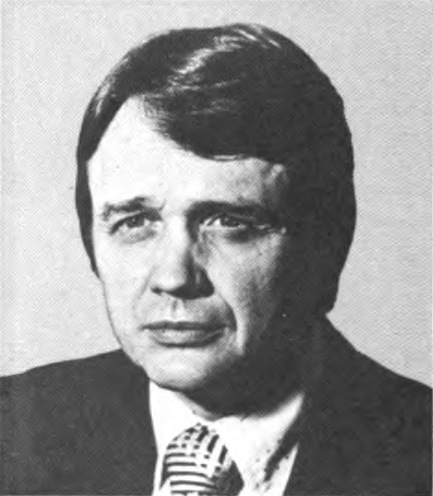

Member of the U.S. House of Representatives from Virginia's 8th district
- In office January 3, 1975 – January 3, 1981
- Preceded by: Stanford Parris
- Succeeded by: Stanford Parris

Member of the Fairfax County Board of Supervisors from the Mount Vernon District
- In office 1968–1974
- Preceded by: Frank F. Everest, Jr.
- Succeeded by: Warren I. Cikins

Personal details
- Born: Herbert Eugene Harris II; April 14, 1926 Kansas City, Missouri, U.S.
- Died: December 24, 2014 (aged 88) Fairfax County, Virginia, U.S.
- Resting place: Quantico National Cemetery
- Party: Democratic
- Spouse: Nancy
- Children: Herbert (Bert) Eugene Harris III, Frank Edward Harris, Susan Ellen (Harris) Hept, Sean Hull Harris, Kevin Harris
- Education: Rockhurst College (BA); Georgetown University Law School (JD)

Herbert Eugene Harris II (April 14, 1926 – December 24, 2014) was an American lawyer and politician who served as a Democratic member of the United States House of Representatives from Virginia. He served three consecutive terms from 1975 to 1981.

His district included part of Fairfax County.

== Early life ==
Born in Kansas City, Missouri, Harris attended St. Francis Xavier Elementary School, Kansas City from 1930 to 1939. He graduated from Rockhurst High School, Kansas City, 1943. He attended Missouri Valley College, Marshall, from 1944 to 1945, and University of Notre Dame from 1945 to 1946. He earned a B.A. from Rockhurst College in 1948 and a J.D. from Georgetown University Law School, Washington, D.C., 1951. He was admitted to the Missouri and District of Columbia bars in 1951 and commenced practice in Kansas City.

He moved to the Washington, D.C., area in 1951. He is the cofounder, vice president, and general counsel of the international trade consultants firm of Warner & Harris, Inc. He served on the Fairfax County, Virginia, Board of Supervisors from 1968 to 1974. He served as member of the Northern Virginia Transportation Authority from 1968 to 1974. He served as vice-chairman of the Washington Metropolitan Area Transit Authority from 1970 to 1974.

== Congress ==
Harris was elected as a Democrat to the 94th Congress in 1974, defeating incumbent Rep. Stanford E. Parris. He was re-elected to the 95th and 96th Congresses, serving January 3, 1975 to January 3, 1981, overall. He was an unsuccessful candidate for reelection in 1980 to the 97th Congress, defeated by Stanford E. Parris, who regained his former congressional seat. In 1982, Harris attempted a comeback, but lost 48.6%-49.7%. Harris offered sympathy when Stanford E. Parris died in 2010.

== Electoral history ==
Virginia's 8th congressional district: Results 1974–1980
Year	Democrat	Votes	Pct	Republican	Votes	Pct	3rd Party	Party	Votes	Pct
1974	Herbert Harris	53,074	58%	Stanford Parris	38,997	42%				
1976	Herbert Harris	83,245	52%	James Tate	68,729	43%	Michael Cannon	Independent	9,292	6%
1978	Herbert Harris	56,137	50%	Jack Herrity	52,396	47%	Charles Coe	Independent	2,632	2%
1980	Herbert Harris	94,530	48%	Stanford Parris	95,624	49%	Deborah Frantz	Independent	5,729	3%
1982	Herbert Harris	68,071	48%	Stanford Parris	69,620	50%	Austin W. Morrill	Independent	2,373	2%

== Personal life ==
He resumed the practice of law with the firm of Harris & Berg in Washington, D.C. He was a resident of Mount Vernon, Virginia.

Harris died on December 24, 2014, at his house in Fairfax County, Virginia, aged 88.

While in Congress, he was a key proponent for establishing the Quantico National Cemetery. He was interred there with his wife, Nancy Fodell Harris.

U.S. House of Representatives
Preceded by Stanford E. Parris	Member of the U.S. House of Representatives from Virginia's 8th congressional district 1975–1981	Succeeded by Stanford E. Parris
