= Daily Press (California) =

Daily newspaper published in Victorville, California

- Type: Daily newspaper
- Owner: USA Today Co.
- Founder: John E. Barry
- Founded: 1937
- Language: English
- Headquarters: Victorville, California
- Circulation: 23,000 Daily; 30,000 Sunday (as of 2010)
- ISSN: 1042-8496
- OCLC number: 19227667
- Website: vvdailypress.com

The Daily Press is a newspaper published in Victorville, California. The Daily Press also publishes the Hesperia Star and the Lucerne Valley Leader.

== History ==
On Oct. 15, 1937, the first edition of The Victor Press was published by John E. Barry and his wife Betsy Barry. Barry went on to write several novels that he sold to publishers in London and taught a journalism class at Victor Valley College. He retired from the business in September 1958 after selling his half-interest to Murray S. Flander.

Two years later, Flander sold his stake in June 1960 to Mrs. Jerene Appleby Harnish, owner of The Daily Report and president of the KASK radio station in Ontario, California. Frank Barnett, former partner of Flander, sold two-thirds of his 30% stake to Harnish, giving her 70% ownership.

In 1978, Freedom Communications bought the Daily Press, and sold it, along with the Desert Dispatch of Barstow, for $8 million to New Media Investment Group in 2014. The Dispatch was absorbed into the Daily Press in 2017. The company transferred ownership to GateHouse Media, which it merged with Gannett in 2019. In March 2024, the Daily Press deceased the number of weekly print editions to two and switched from carrier to postal delivery.
