= Stanford Parris =

American lawyer and politician from Virginia (1929–2010)

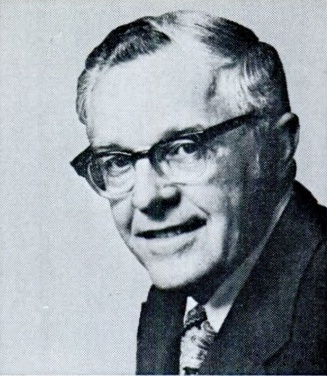

Member of the U.S. House of Representatives from Virginia's 8th district
- In office January 3, 1981 – January 3, 1991
- Preceded by: Herbert Harris
- Succeeded by: Jim Moran
- In office January 3, 1973 – January 3, 1975
- Preceded by: William L. Scott
- Succeeded by: Herbert Harris

Member of the Virginia House of Delegates
- In office April 11, 1969 – November 21, 1972
- Preceded by: Guy Farley
- Succeeded by: Jim Tate
- Constituency: 20th district (1969–1972); 19th district (1972)

Member of the Fairfax County Board of Supervisors from the Mason district
- In office 1964–1967
- Preceded by: Anne A. Wilkins
- Succeeded by: Harold O. Miller

Personal details
- Born: Stanford Elmer Parris; September 9, 1929 Champaign, Illinois, U.S.
- Died: March 27, 2010 (aged 80) Mathews County, Virginia, U.S.
- Party: Republican
- Education: University of Illinois at Urbana-Champaign; George Washington University

Military service
- Allegiance: United States
- Branch/service: United States Air Force
- Years of service: 1950–1954
- Rank: First lieutenant
- Battles/wars: Korean War
- Awards: Dist. Flying Cross; Purple Heart; Air Medal

Stanford Elmer Parris (September 9, 1929 – March 27, 2010) was an American lawyer and Republican politician. He represented Virginia's 8th congressional district in the United States House of Representatives from 1981 to 1991. He served in the Fairfax County Board of Supervisors, Virginia House of Delegates, and also as Virginia Secretary of the Commonwealth. He served in the United States Air Force during the Korean War, earning several medals.

== Early life ==
Parris was born in Champaign, Illinois, and educated in the public schools there. He earned a B.S. at University of Illinois (1950), and an LL.B. at the George Washington University (1958) while working as a doorkeeper at the United States Senate. He was a U.S. Air Force F-84 Thunderjet jet fighter aircraft pilot in the Korean War, and was shot down once and rescued. His military decorations include the Distinguished Flying Cross with cluster, Air Medal with clusters, Purple Heart, Presidential Unit Citation for the Republic of Korea, and Presidential Unit Citation for the United States. Following his discharge from the military, Parris worked briefly as an airline pilot, before starting law school. He was admitted to the bar in 1958, and set up a private law practice in Alexandria, Virginia. Parris was president of a Chrysler dealership in Woodbridge, Virginia, and the Flying Circus Aerodrome, an air show.

== Politics ==
Parris was elected to the Fairfax County Board of Supervisors and served one term (1964–1967). In 1969, he was elected to the Virginia House of Delegates and served from April 11, 1969, to November 21, 1972. During that time he made a controversial comment when he joked that the 14th Street Bridge between Virginia and Washington, DC was the "longest in the world" because it "stretches from Northern Virginia to Africa." Nonetheless, he was elected in 1972 to the United States House of Representatives, but lost his 1974 reelection bid to Democrat Herb Harris in the post-Watergate scandal. However, in the 1980 House elections, he defeated Harris by 1,090 votes. He sought his party's nomination for the 1985 election of Governor of Virginia, but withdrew in May. In 1989, Parris again ran for Governor of Virginia. He lost in the Republican primary to former Attorney General Marshall Coleman and former United States Senator Paul S. Trible. He also served a term as Virginia Secretary of the Commonwealth in the late 1970s.

In the 93rd Congress, Parris was a member of the House Committee on Science and Technology, its subcommittees on Aeronautics and Space Technology, Science, Research, and Development and Energy. Economic woes and a federal budget stalemate contributed to his 1990 election loss to then Alexandria mayor James P. Moran Jr. Parris was also known for introducing a bill during his first term which prohibited the National Football League from imposing television blackouts of non-sold-out games. His position as the ranking Republican member of the House District Committee often put him at odds with the city government of the District of Columbia, and resulted in frequent quarreling with the mayor, Marion Barry.

Parris thought about running for the United States Senate in 1982 after Harry F. Byrd Jr. retired, but opted to run for reelection to the House after Harris sought to regain his old seat. He defeated Harris by 1,600 votes, spending $700,000 in Virginia's most expensive congressional campaign up to that point. He defeated State Senator Dick Saslaw with somewhat less difficulty in 1984, and easily defeated underfunded Democrats in 1986 and 1988. However, in 1990, he lost to Alexandria mayor Jim Moran by seven points in what is still considered an upset. During the campaign, Parris, referring to the issue of the Gulf War, said, "The only three people I know who support Saddam Hussein's position are Moammar Gadhafi, Yasser Arafat, and Jim Moran." Moran angrily responded by saying that Parris was "a deceitful, fatuous jerk", and that he wanted "to break his nose". Moran's well-financed campaign also focused on Parris' opposition to abortion. Moran upset Parris, winning by 7.1 percent.

President George H. W. Bush appointed him to a seven-year term as President of the Saint Lawrence Seaway Development Corporation in 1991, weeks after he left Congress. He resigned four years later to run for a seat in the Virginia Senate. His primary residence after leaving Congress was in Melbourne, Florida; but he also owned property in Mathews County, Virginia.

== Death ==
Stanford Parris died from heart disease on March 27, 2010, at his home in Mathews County in eastern Virginia. He was buried at Arlington National Cemetery.

Following the death of Parris, Virginia Governor Bob McDonnell said in a statement that Parris "played major leadership roles" in endeavors as varied as the establishment of the Torpedo Factory Art Center in Old Town Alexandria to flood control and closing the District of Columbia's former Lorton Reformatory in Fairfax County, Virginia, and that "He used his time on this Earth to help others, and to effectively advance the ideas and principles in which he believed."

== Electoral history ==
Year	Subject	Party	Votes	%	Opponent	Party	Votes	%	Opponent	Party	Votes	%
1972	Stanford Parris	Republican	60,446	44.4	Robert F. Horan	Democratic	51,444	37.7	William Durland	Independent	18,654	13.7
1974	Stanford Parris	Republican	38,997	42.3	Herbert E. Harris	Democratic	53,074	57.6				
1980	Stanford Parris	Republican	95,624	48.8	Herbert E. Harris	Democratic	94,530	48.2	Deborah Frantz	Independent	5,729	3.0
1982	Stanford Parris	Republican	69,620	49.7	Herbert E. Harris	Democratic	68,071	48.5	Austin W. Morrill	Independent	2,373	1.6
1984	Stanford Parris	Republican	125,015	55.7	Richard L. Saslaw	Democratic	97,250	43.3	Donald Carpenter	Independent	1,814	0.8
1986	Stanford Parris	Republican	72,670	61.7	James H. Boren	Democratic	44,965	38.2				
1988	Stanford Parris	Republican	154,761	62.3	David G. Brickley	Democratic	93,561	37.6				
1990	Stanford Parris	Republican	76,367	44.6	James Moran	Democratic	88,745	51.7	Robert T. Murphy	Independent	5,958	3.5

Virginia House of Delegates
Preceded by Guy Farley	Member of the Virginia House of Delegates from the 20th district County of Fairfax; Cities of Alexandria, Fairfax, and Falls Church; 1969–1972	Succeeded by Jim Tate
Preceded by Guy Farley	Member of the Virginia House of Delegates from the 19th district Counties of Fairfax (part) and Prince William (part); City of Fairfax; 1972	Succeeded by Jim Tate
U.S. House of Representatives
Preceded by William L. Scott	Member of the U.S. House of Representatives from Virginia's 8th congressional district 1973–1975	Succeeded by Herbert Harris
Preceded by Herbert Harris	Member of the U.S. House of Representatives from Virginia's 8th congressional district 1981–1991	Succeeded by Jim Moran
