= Bucyrus Telegraph-Forum =

Local newspaper in Ohio, US

Bucyrus Telegraph-Forum is a newspaper based in Bucyrus, Ohio. It was established as The Bucyrus Telegraph-Forum in 1923 by Crawford Co. Print. and Pub. Co., having evolved from several preceding entities and mergers: The Bucyrus Evening Telegraph (1894–1923), Bucyrus Journal (1864–1923), The Daily Forum (1888–1923), and The News-Forum (1901–1923). It is part of the USA Today Network, published by Gannett Co. Inc. Its focus is as a local newspaper, covering events and news in Bucyrus and its surrounding area, especially Crawford County, Ohio.
