= Alliance, Ohio =

- City
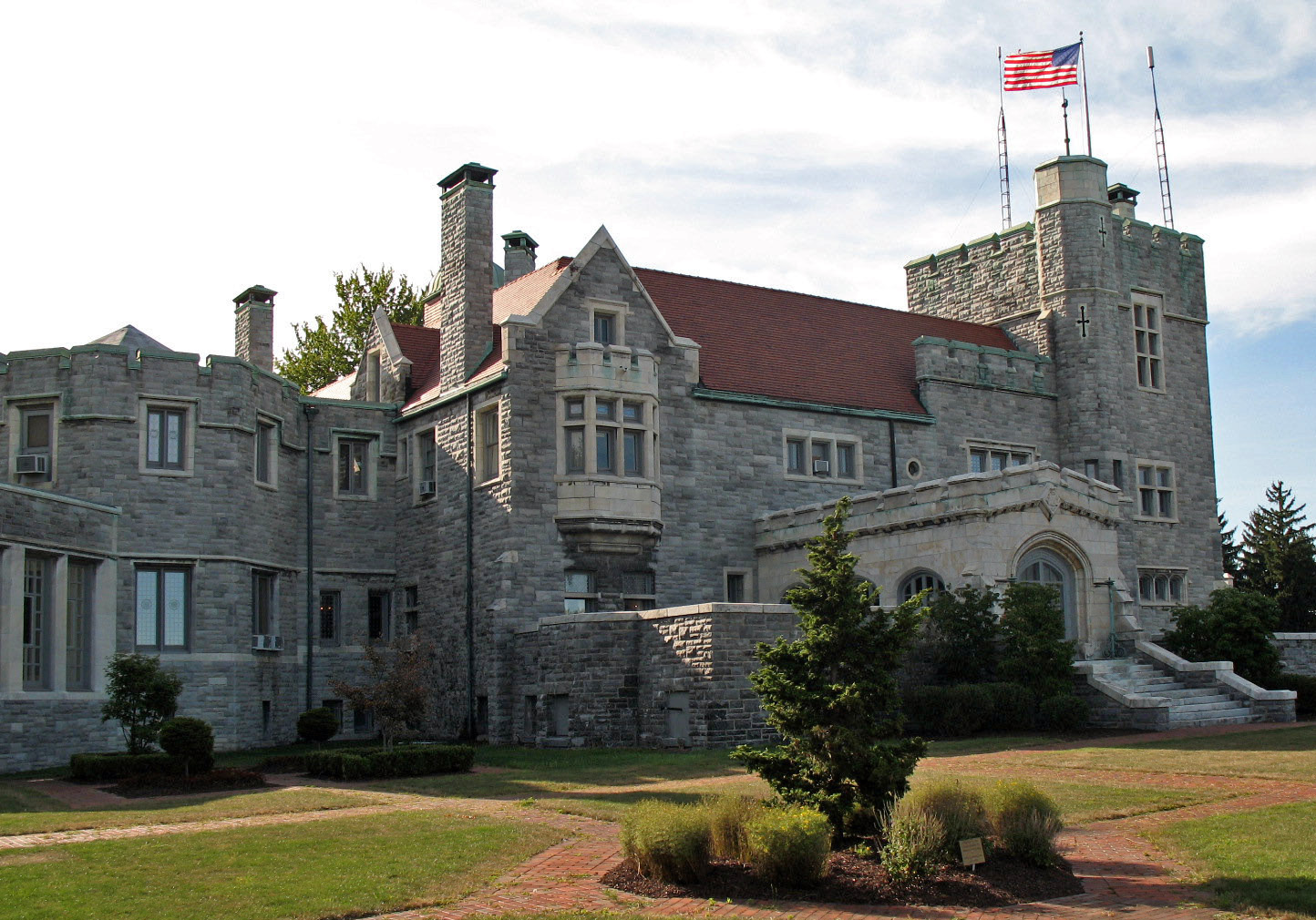
- Glamorgan Castle

- Flag
- Nickname: Carnation City
- Interactive map of Alliance, Ohio
- Location within Ohio Location within the United States
- Coordinates: 40°54′33″N 81°08′21″W
- Country: United States
- State: Ohio
- Counties: Stark, Mahoning

Government
  - Type: Mayor–council
  - Mayor: Andrew Grove (R)
  - Council President: Arthur Garnes

Area
  - Total: 9.06 sq mi (23.46 km^{2})
  - Land: 9.01 sq mi (23.34 km^{2})
  - Water: 0.046 sq mi (0.12 km^{2})
- Elevation: 1,181 ft (360 m)

Population (2020)
  - Total: 21,672
  - Estimate (2023): 21,525
  - Density: 2,404.9/sq mi (928.52/km^{2})
- Time zone: UTC-5 (Eastern (EST))
  - Summer (DST): UTC-4 (EDT)
- ZIP code: 44601
- Area codes: 330, 234
- FIPS code: 39-01420
- GNIS feature ID: 1086972
- Website: www.cityofalliance.com

Alliance is a city in Stark County, Ohio, United States. The population was 21,672 at the 2020 census. It was established in 1854 by the merger of three smaller communities and was a manufacturing and railroad hub in the 20th century. Alliance is associated with the state flower of Ohio, the scarlet carnation, and is known as the "Carnation City". The University of Mount Union, a private liberal arts college established in 1846, is located in the city. Partially extending into Mahoning County, Alliance is part of the Canton–Massillon metropolitan area.

== History ==
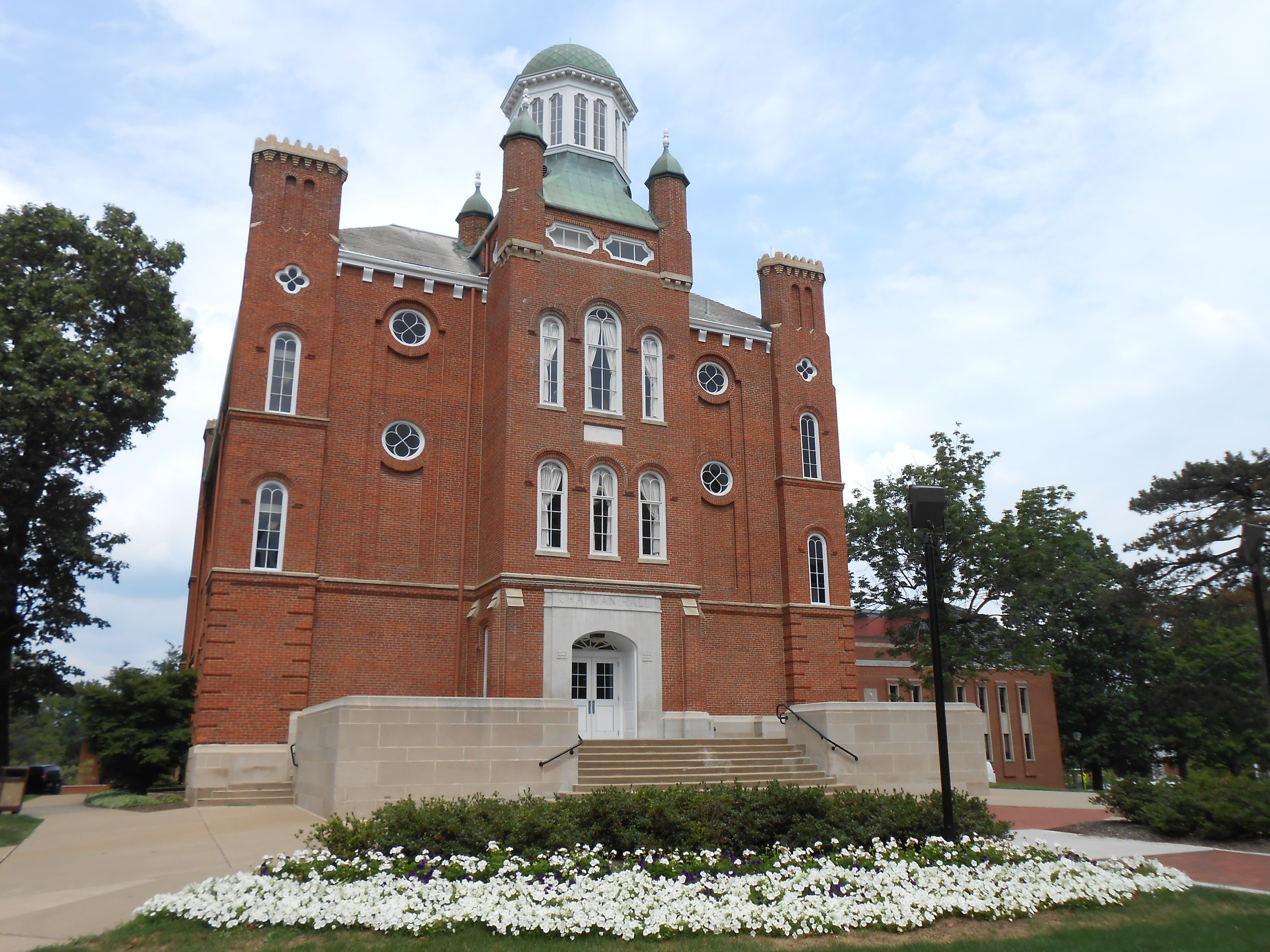
Chapman Hall, University of Mount Union campus (1864)

Alliance was founded in 1854 by the merger of three smaller communities called Williamsport, formed in 1827, Freedom, formed in 1838, and Liberty, formed in 1850 to act as a station and support hub for the Cleveland and Pittsburgh Railroad. A fourth community, Mount Union, was added in 1888. Alliance was incorporated as a city in 1889.

There are two popular theories regarding the origin of the city's name. One holds that it was chosen because of the "alliance" of three small settlements into a larger entity. The other theory says the name reflects the fact that two major railroad lines, the Cleveland and Pittsburgh Railroad and the Ohio and Pennsylvania Railroad, intersected at Alliance, once known as "The Crossing".

On April 12, 1856, Alliance was directly struck by a tornado, causing extensive damage. A roof of a church was removed, and another church was moved off its foundation. A train that stopped at the Alliance Station was pushed off its rails. The destruction was estimated to be $15,000 to $20,000 (in 1856 dollars, equivalent to $716,667 in 2025). A few injuries and one fatality were confirmed.

In 1923, Alliance Rubber Company was founded in Alliance. It was a manufacturer of rubber bands cut from discarded rubber rings into small strips.

Alliance's Main Street was originally laid out to bring traffic to the train station, the heart of the city's transportation hub. The railroads were central to industry and personal transportation, bringing in raw materials for factories and sending out finished goods. Due to this, Alliance is sometimes referred to as "the town where Main Street is a dead end".

Alliance became a qualified Tree City USA as recognized by the National Arbor Day Foundation in 1982.

== Geography ==
Alliance is located approximately 16 miles (26 km) northeast of Canton, 27 miles (43 km) southwest of Youngstown and 51 miles (82 km) southeast of Cleveland. According to the United States Census Bureau, the city has a total area of 8.96 square miles (23.21 km^{2}), of which 8.92 square miles (23.10 km^{2}) is land and 0.04 square miles (0.10 km^{2}) is water. There are no lakes within city limits, although the Mahoning River flows through the northeastern part of the city.

== Demographics ==
Historical population
Census	Pop.	Note	%±
1840	315		—
1850	500		58.7%
1860	1,421		184.2%
1870	4,063		185.9%
1880	4,636		14.1%
1890	7,607		64.1%
1900	8,974		18.0%
1910	15,083		68.1%
1920	21,603		43.2%
1930	23,047		6.7%
1940	22,405		−2.8%
1950	26,161		16.8%
1960	28,362		8.4%
1970	26,547		−6.4%
1980	24,322		−8.4%
1990	23,376		−3.9%
2000	23,253		−0.5%
2010	22,322		−4.0%
2020	21,672		−2.9%
2025 (est.)	21,582		−0.4%
U.S. Decennial Census

=== 2020 census ===
As of the 2020 census, Alliance had a population of 21,672. The median age was 37.5 years. 20.7% of residents were under the age of 18 and 18.7% of residents were 65 years of age or older. For every 100 females there were 92.1 males, and for every 100 females age 18 and over there were 88.8 males age 18 and over.

100.0% of residents lived in urban areas, while <0.1% lived in rural areas.

There were 8,666 households in Alliance, of which 26.5% had children under the age of 18 living in them. Of all households, 33.3% were married-couple households, 21.0% were households with a male householder and no spouse or partner present, and 35.1% were households with a female householder and no spouse or partner present. About 35.0% of all households were made up of individuals and 15.0% had someone living alone who was 65 years of age or older.

There were 9,604 housing units, of which 9.8% were vacant. Among occupied housing units, 51.0% were owner-occupied and 49.0% were renter-occupied. The homeowner vacancy rate was 2.1% and the rental vacancy rate was 5.8%.

Racial composition as of the 2020 census
Race	Number	Percent
White	17,530	80.9%
Black or African American	2,084	9.6%
American Indian and Alaska Native	37	0.2%
Asian	125	0.6%
Native Hawaiian and Other Pacific Islander	14	0.1%
Some other race	242	1.1%
Two or more races	1,640	7.6%
Hispanic or Latino (of any race)	534	2.5%

=== 2010 census ===
As of the census of 2010, there were 22,322 people, 8,631 households, and 5,232 families living in the city. The population density was 2,502.5 inhabitants per square mile (966.2/km^{2}). There were 10,022 housing units at an average density of 1,123.5 per square mile (433.8/km^{2}). The racial makeup of the city was 84.6% White, 10.5% African American, 0.2% Native American, 0.8% Asian, 0.5% from other races, and 3.4% from two or more races. Hispanic or Latino of any race were 1.9% of the population.

There were 8,631 households, of which 29.8% had children under the age of 18 living with them, 37.6% were married couples living together, 17.1% had a female householder with no husband present, 5.9% had a male householder with no wife present, and 39.4% were non-families. 32.0% of all households were made up of individuals, and 13.6% had someone living alone who was 65 years of age or older. The average household size was 2.38 and the average family size was 2.96.

The median age in the city was 35.3 years. 22% of residents were under the age of 18; 16.1% were between the ages of 18 and 24; 22.4% were from 25 to 44; 23.9% were from 45 to 64; and 15.7% were 65 years of age or older. The gender makeup of the city was 47.9% male and 52.1% female.

=== 2000 census ===
As of the census of 2000, there were 23,253 people, 8,908 households, and 5,665 families living in the city. The population density was 2,700.1 inhabitants per square mile (1,042.5/km^{2}). There were 9,730 housing units at an average density of 1,129.8 per square mile (436.2/km^{2}). The racial makeup of the city was 85.51% White, 11.19% African American, 0.17% Native American, 0.77% Asian, 0.02% Pacific Islander, 0.41% from other races, and 1.93% from two or more races. Hispanic or Latino of any race were 1.17% of the population.

There were 8,908 households, out of which 28.5% had children under the age of 18 living with them, 44.2% were married couples living together, 14.9% had a female householder with no husband present, and 36.4% were non-families. 30.8% of all households were made up of individuals, and 14.1% had someone living alone who was 65 years of age or older. The average household size was 2.41 and the average family size was 2.98.

In the city, the population was spread out, with 23.5% under the age of 18, 15.5% from 18 to 24, 24.8% from 25 to 44, 20.1% from 45 to 64, and 16.2% who were 65 years of age or older. The median age was 34 years. For every 100 females, there were 87.5 males. For every 100 females age 18 and over, there were 83.3 males.

The median income for a household in the city was $30,078, and the median income for a family was $37,011. Males had a median income of $31,033 versus $20,063 for females. The per capita income for the city was $15,185. About 12.7% of families and 18.0% of the population were below the poverty line, including 26.8% of those under age 18 and 10.7% of those age 65 or over.

== Arts and culture ==
Alliance is a town rich with social, industrial and railroad history, with the restored Glamorgan Castle, previous home of the owner of Morgan Engineering; the Haines House, a restored underground railroad home; and the Mabel Hartzell historic home; all three properties are listed on the National Register of Historic Places. The name of Levi L. Lamborn, the man who cultivated the scarlet carnation, Ohio's state flower, can still be seen on the facade of a building in the old downtown district. The Richardsonian Romanesque stone house of the Devine family is currently being renovated. The historic downtown area is experiencing a gradual renaissance, with the opening of a Saturday Farmers' Market on Main Street near the historic Caboose, and the renovation of a storefront on Main Street as an art gallery and live performance space, joining a scattering of antique shops and other businesses.

The Cat Fanciers' Association relocated to the former Midland-Buckeye bank, at 260 East Main Street, in June 2011, opening the CFA Foundation's Feline Historical Museum, the first of its kind of the United States.

Alliance was also home to the World War History & Art Museum (WWHAM), located in College Plaza at 1300 East State Street. WWHAM had a dozen exhibits including a world class collection of 320 original paintings and drawings by the troops of World War I, an HO scale model of the German 2nd Panzer Division in 1944, and original art by the pilots and airmen of World War II. It closed to the public on April 17, 2014, and now does traveling shows.

=== The Carnation City ===
Alliance is commonly referred to as the Carnation City, having been given that designation by the Ohio General Assembly in 1959. Alliance gave Ohio its official state flower, the scarlet carnation. Alliance's association with the carnation began in 1866 when an Alliance doctor, Levi L. Lamborn, purchased six potted carnation plants to grow in a greenhouse at his house. At that time this flower was rarely cultivated in the United States. In 1876 Lamborn ran against William McKinley for the Congressional seat from this district. The two men were personal friends, although they were political opponents. McKinley had expressed his admiration for Lamborn's carnations, so before each of their political debates Lamborn gave McKinley a carnation to wear on his lapel. Mr. McKinley won the election and associated the carnation with his success, and wore carnations during his successful campaigns for Governor of Ohio and then President of the United States.

In 1884, Lamborn suggested that Ohio should make the carnation a state emblem. In 1904, three years after President McKinley's assassination, the Ohio General Assembly designated the scarlet carnation as the official state flower as a "token of love and reverence to the memory of William McKinley". On January 29 of each year (President McKinley's birth anniversary), a bouquet of red carnations is placed in the hands of McKinley's statue at the Capitol in Columbus.

Since 1960, Alliance has held an annual Carnation Festival during August.

== Government ==
Alliance operates under a mayor–council government. Eight council members are elected as a legislature for 2-year terms, comprising four separate wards, three at-large districts, and a council president. In addition, an independently elected mayor serves as an executive. The current mayor is Andrew Grove. The current council president is Art Garnes. The mayor, auditor, treasurer, and law director are all elected to 4-year terms.

== Education ==
=== Primary and secondary schools ===
Alliance is served by the public Alliance City School District, which oversees the following schools serving the city:

- Alliance Early Learning School – grades PK-1
- Alliance Elementary School at Rockhill – grades 2–3
- Alliance Intermediate School – grades 4–5
- Alliance Middle School – grades 6–8
- Alliance High School – grades 9–12
- Parkway Learning and Development Center – alternative & online education

The local Catholic parish school, Holy Cross Academy – Regina Coelli Campus, is overseen by the Diocese of Youngstown and serves students from pre-kindergarten to eighth grade.

=== Higher education ===
The University of Mount Union was founded in 1846 and is near the intersection of Union Avenue and State Street.

== Media ==
Alliance is the city of license for PBS affiliate WNEO, channel 45, which has its studios and offices in Kent. Alliance is also the city of license for radio stations WDJQ (92.5 FM) and WDPN (1310 AM).

== Transportation ==
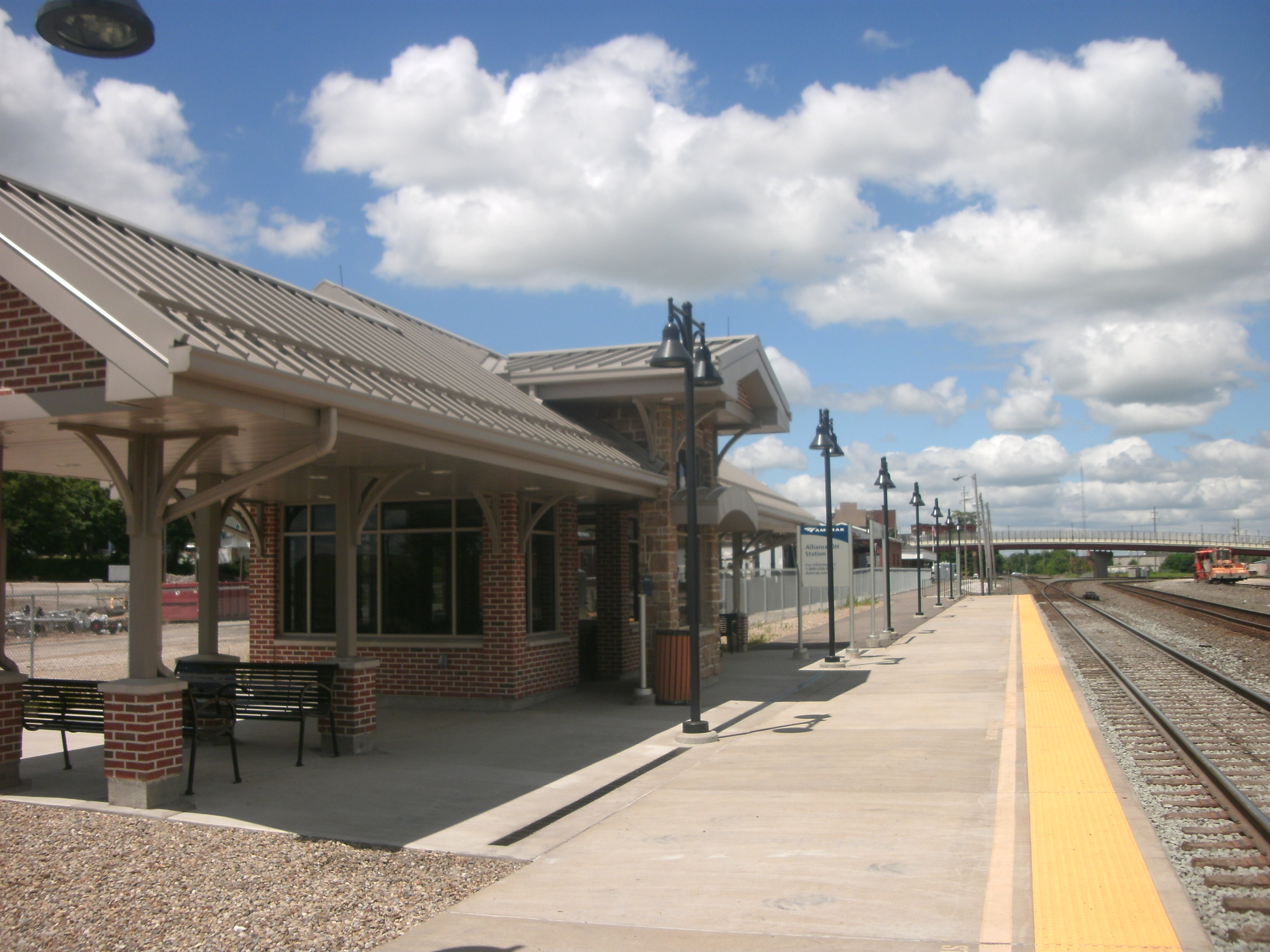
Alliance station

Alliance is served by Amtrak's Capitol Limited between Chicago and Washington, D.C., via Alliance station, located at 820 East Main Street. The municipality is also served by the Stark Area Regional Transit Authority (SARTA) bus system.

Barber Airport is a privately owned, public-use airport located 10.5 miles (16.9 km) north of Alliance. The airport historically hosted the Ohio Aeronca Aviators Fly-In.

== Notable people ==
- Charles Armstrong, virologist
- Ken Blackwell, 48th Ohio secretary of state and 43rd Ohio treasurer
- Kierstan Bell, WNBA guard for the Las Vegas Aces
- Herman Carr, physicist and pioneer of magnetic resonance imaging
- Len Dawson, 1987 Pro Football Hall of Fame inductee
- Hilan Ebert, US Naval Academy graduate lost at sea in World War II
- Allan Funk, professional wrestler
- William Miller Jenkins, 5th Governor of Oklahoma Territory
- Gertrude Alice Kay, children's book illustrator and author
- Perry King, actor and star of Riptide
- Levi L. Lamborn, doctor, horticulturalist, and politician
- Yuri Lowenthal, American voice actor
- Don Panoz, pharmaceutical and motorsport entrepreneur
- Dymonte Thomas, NFL player
- Gertrude Tressel Rider, braille librarian
- Ivan Sag, linguist and cognitive scientist
- Lorin B. Sebrell, rubber chemist
- Hugh Wilson, botanist and professor at Texas A&M University
