= Mansfield News Journal =

Daily newspaper in Mansfield, Ohio, U.S.

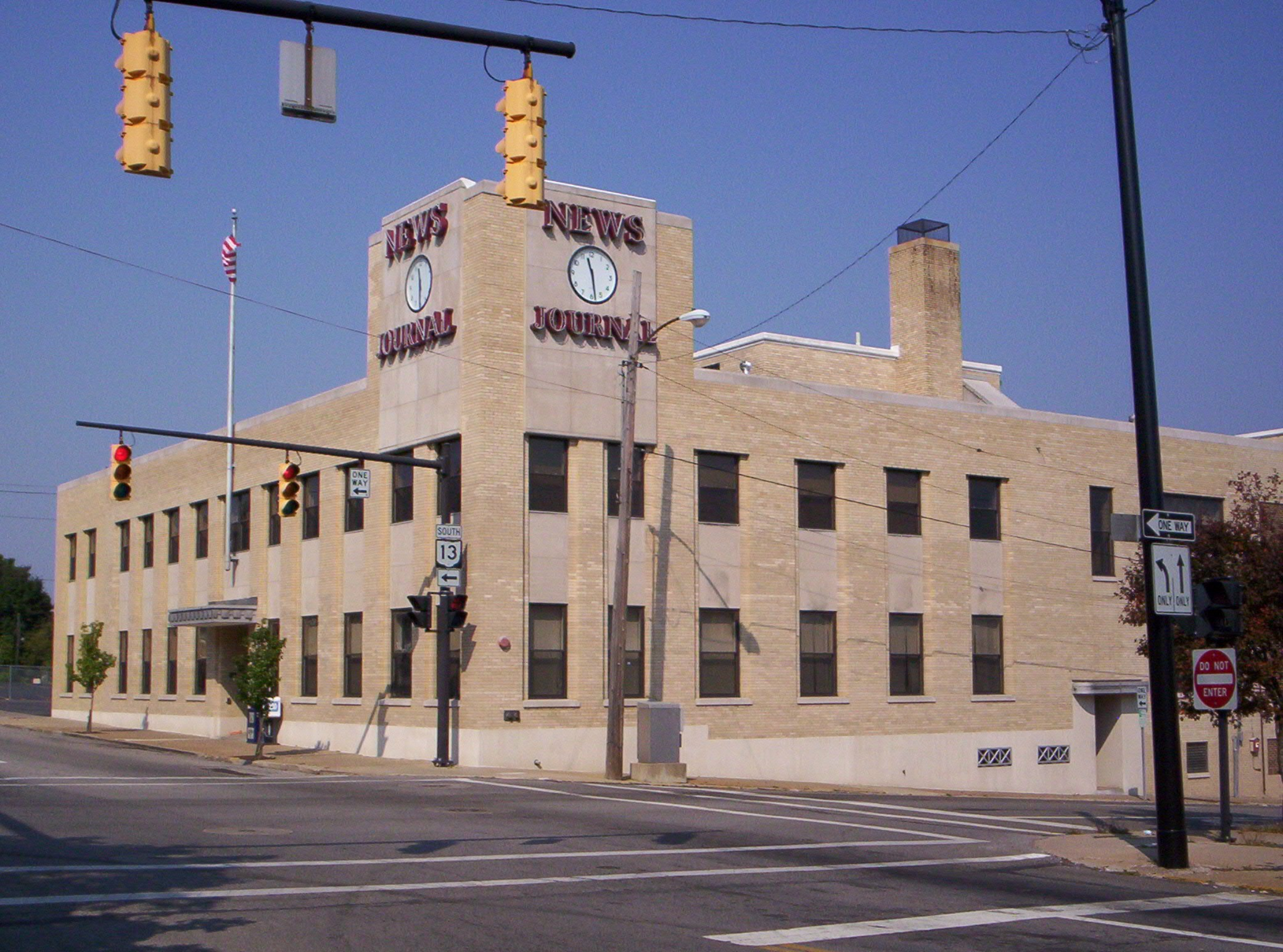
- The Mansfield News Journal building in downtown Mansfield
- Type: Daily newspaper
- Format: Broadsheet
- Owner: USA Today Co.
- Publisher: Tom Brennan
- Editor: David Yonke
- Founded: 1930
- Language: English
- Headquarters: 70 W. Fourth St. Mansfield, OH 44903; United States
- Circulation: 31,665 morning 40,744 Sunday
- Price: $0.50 Weekday $1.50 Sunday
- Website: MansfieldNewsJournal.com

The Mansfield News Journal is an American daily newspaper based in Mansfield, Ohio. It serves Richland, Ashland and Crawford counties, as well as parts of Morrow, Knox and Huron counties in the north central part of the state.

== History ==
The Library of Congress records the Manfield News as operating from 1894 to 1932. W.S. Cappeller and H.S. Heistand were its publishers. Howard Louis Conard, who went on to serve as Ohio State Librarian and who authored biographies, and edit encyclopedias, was an editor at the paper.

The News Journal was formed by the merger of the Mansfield News and the Mansfield Journal in 1932. The paper celebrated its 75th anniversary in December 2007.

== Overview ==
Ted Daniels is the newspaper's managing editor. Daniels filled the role in January 2016 after the retirement of longtime editor Tom Brennan.

The paper is owned by Gannett (The USA Today Network of Ohio) and has downsized its print operation in recent years to focus more upon online content. Effective March 5, 2022, the Saturday newspaper moved to an only online format they call their e-edition.

== Awards ==
The newspaper's web site was chosen the state's best among newspapers in its circulation category in 2007 in the annual AP contest.
