= The Alliance Review =

American local newspaper

- Type: Daily newspaper
- Owner: USA Today Co.
- Founded: 1888
- City: Alliance, Ohio
- Circulation: 4,822 (as of 2018)
- Website: the-review.com

The Alliance Review is a community-based newspaper in Alliance, Ohio, and nearby areas of Northeast Ohio. The paper publishes six days a week.

The Review was founded in 1888, and is currently owned by USA Today Co. (formerly GateHouse Media), who acquired the newspaper in February 2017 from Dix Communications.
