= List of newspapers in Ohio =

This is a list of newspapers in Ohio. Eight of these are part of the Ohio News Organization and most are part of the Ohio Newspaper Association.

== Major papers ==
- Akron Beacon Journal - Akron
- The Repository - Canton
- The Cincinnati Enquirer - Cincinnati
- The Plain Dealer - Cleveland
- The Columbus Dispatch - Columbus
- Dayton Daily News - Dayton
- The Blade - Toledo
- Tribune Chronicle - Warren
- The Vindicator - Youngstown

== Daily newspapers ==
- Akron Beacon Journal - Akron
- The Alliance Review - Alliance
- Ashland Times-Gazette - Ashland
- Star Beacon - Ashtabula
- The Athens Messenger - Athens
- Beavercreek News-Current - Beavercreek
- The Bryan Times - Bryan
- The Daily Jeffersonian - Cambridge
- The Repository - Canton
- Geauga County Maple Leaf - Chardon
- Chillicothe Gazette - Chillicothe
- The Cincinnati Enquirer - Cincinnati
- Ameriska Domovina - Cleveland
- The Daily Standard - Celina
- The Plain Dealer - Cleveland
- The Columbus Dispatch - Columbus
- Coshocton Tribune - Coshocton
- Dayton Daily News - Dayton
- The Crescent-News - Defiance
- The Delaware Gazette - Delaware
- The Review - East Liverpool
- Fairborn Daily Herald - Fairborn
- The Courier - Findlay
- The News-Messenger - Fremont
- Gallipolis Daily Tribune - Gallipolis
- Journal-News - Hamilton
- The Times-Gazette - Hillsboro
- Huber Heights Courier - Huber Heights
- Ironton Tribune - Ironton
- Record-Courier - Kent-Ravenna
- The Kettering Sentinel - Kettering
- Lancaster Eagle-Gazette - Lancaster
- The Lima News - Lima
- Morning Journal - Lisbon and Columbiana County
- The Logan Daily - Logan
- The Morning Journal - Lorain
- Mansfield News Journal - Mansfield
- The Marietta Times - Marietta
- Martins Ferry Times Leader - Martins Ferry
- The Marysville Journal-Tribune - Marysville
- Medina County Gazette Leader Post – Medina
- The Independent - Massillon
- The Middletown Journal - Middletown
- The Times Reporter - New Philadelphia
- The Advocate - Newark
- Norwalk Reflector - Norwalk
- Norwalk Ohio News - Norwalk
- Piqua Daily Call - Piqua
- The Daily Sentinel - Pomeroy
- Portsmouth Daily Times - Portsmouth
- Salem News - Salem
- The Sandusky Register - Sandusky
- Scioto Valley Guardian - Chillicothe
- The Sidney Daily News - Sidney
- Springfield News-Sun - Springfield
- Herald-Star - Steubenville
- Urbana Daily Citizen - Urbana
- Tribune Chronicle - Warren
- Record Herald - Washington Court House
- The News-Herald - Willoughby
- The Daily Record - Wooster
- Xenia Daily Gazette - Xenia
- The Vindicator - Youngstown
- Times Recorder - Zanesville
- Weirton Daily Times - Steubenville

== Nondaily newspapers ==
- Cleveland Jewish News - Beachwood
- The Sentinel-Tribune - Bowling Green
- News on the Green - Brookfield
- Harrison News-Herald - Cadiz
- The Journal and The Noble County Leader - Caldwell
- Centerburg Gazette - Centerburg
- American Israelite - Cincinnati
- Cincinnati CityBeat - Cincinnati
- The Cincinnati Herald - Cincinnati
- The Catholic Telegraph - Cincinnati
- Circleville Herald - Circleville
- Sun News - Cleveland
- Call and Post - Cleveland
- Dirva - Cleveland
- West Park Times - Cleveland
- Columbus Alive - Columbus
- The Columbus Free Press - Columbus
- The Ohio State Sentinel - Columbus
- The Other Paper - Columbus
- Active Dayton - Dayton
- The Oakwood Register - Dayton
- Crescent News - Defiance
- The Register-Herald - Eaton
- The Enon Eagle - Enon
- Sunday Times-Sentinel - Gallipolis
- The Neighborhood News-Garfield Heights Tribune - Garfield Heights
- The Weekly Villager - Garrettsville
- The Granville (Ohio) Sentinel - Granville
- The Daily Advocate -Greenville
- Heath News Heath, Ohio
- The Highland County Press - Hillsboro
- The Telegram - Jackson
- Gazette Newspapers - Jefferson
- Johnstown Journal - Johnson
- The Western Star - Lebanon
- Logan-Hocking Times - Logan
- Maple Heights Press - Maple Heights
- The Marietta Register - Marietta
- The Vinton County Courier - McArthur
- The Community Post - Minster
- Mount Vernon News - Mount Vernon
- New Carlisle News - New Carlisle
- The Oxford Press - Oxford
- Perry County Tribune - New Lexington
- The News - Newcomerstown
- Pataskala Post - Pataskala
- Paulding County Progress - Paulding County
- The West Bend News - Paulding County
- The Beacon - Port Clinton
- Springboro Star-Press - Springboro
- Ohio Valley Newspaper - Steubenville
- Swanton Enterprise - Swanton
- Tippecanoe Gazette - Tipp City
- Toledo Free Press - Toledo
- Miami Valley Today - Troy
- Troy Tribune - Troy
- Utica Herald - Utica
- Fulton County Expositor - Wauseon
- The Pike County News Watchman - Waverly
- The People's Defender - West Union
- News Journal - Wilmington, Ohio
- Monroe County Beacon - Woodsfield
- Yellow Springs News - Yellow Springs
- The Blade - Toledo
- Valley Press - Newark
- The Times Bulletin - Van Wert

== Student newspapers ==
- The Buchtelite (University of Akron) - Akron
- Flyer News (University of Dayton) - Dayton
- The Lantern (Ohio State University) - Columbus
- The Miami Student (Miami University) - Oxford
- The Post (Ohio University) - Athens
- The Wittenberg Torch (Wittenberg University) - Springfield
- The Wright State Guardian (Wright State University) - Fairborn

== Defunct newspapers ==
- The Athens News (1977-2026)
- The Akron Press joined in 1925 with Akron Times to be The Akron Times-Press.
- The Barberton Herald (1923-2022)
- Celina Democrat (1895–1921)
- The Cedarville Herald (from July 1890 to December 1954)
- Cincinnati Herald
- The Cincinnati Post (1881–2007)
- Cincinnati Times-Star (1880–1958)
- Cincinnati Volksfreund
- Cleveland Leader
- Cleveland News (1905-1960)
- Cleveland Press (1878-1982)
- Commercial Register (Sandusky) (1859–1869)
- The Columbus Citizen-Journal (1959–1985)
- Columbus Star
- Daily Register (Sandusky) (1856–1859)
- Dayton City Paper (April 2003 to September 2018)
- Dayton Journal-Herald
- Evening and Morning Star (Kirtland)
- Holmes County Republican
- The Jackson County Times-Journal (Jackson) (?-2018)
- The Louisville Herald
- Penny Evening Telegram (Springfield) (1860s)
- The Philanthropist (Cincinnati) (1836–1843)
- Sandusky Clarion (1822–1852)
- Sandusky News (?-1941)
- Sandusky Star-Journal (?-1929)
- Springfield Republic
- Tägliches Cincinnati Volksblatt (1836–1919)
- Toledo News-Bee
- Toledo Commercial (1892–1900)
- Toledo Times (1900–1975)
- The Yellow Springs American (from June 11, 1953 through at least April 15, 1954)

== See also ==
Comprehensive

- Lists of newspapers
- List of newspapers in the United States

Frequency

- List of free daily newspapers in the United States
- List of weekly newspapers in the United States

Circulation

- List of international newspapers originating in the United States
- List of national newspapers in the United States
- List of newspapers in the United States by circulation

Foreign language

- List of French-language newspapers published in the United States
- List of German-language newspapers published in the United States
- List of Spanish-language newspapers published in the United States

Specialty

- List of African-American newspapers in the United States
- List of alternative weekly newspapers in the United States
- List of business newspapers in the United States
- List of family-owned newspapers in the United States
- List of Jewish newspapers in the United States
- List of LGBTQ periodicals in the United States
- List of student newspapers in the United States
- List of supermarket tabloids in the United States
- List of underground press in the United States

Other

- List of defunct newspapers of the United States
