= Bob Nutting =

American businessman and sports team owner

Robert Nutting
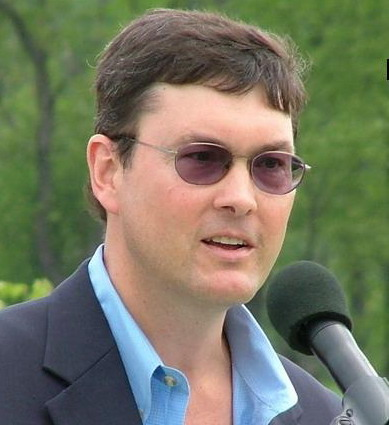
- Nutting in 2009
- Born: March 29, 1962 (age 64); Wheeling, West Virginia, U.S.
- Education: Williams College
- Known for: Owner of Pittsburgh Pirates Major League Baseball franchise; former owner, chairman, and CEO of Seven Springs Mountain Resort

Robert Nutting (born March 29, 1962) is an American businessman and sports team owner. Since 2007, he has been the principal owner and chairman of the board of the Pittsburgh Pirates of Major League Baseball. His other business activities include serving as president and CEO of Ogden Newspapers Inc. He is also the former chairman of Seven Springs Mountain Resort, Hidden Valley Resort, and Laurel Mountain Ski Area, which he sold to Vail Resorts in December 2021 in a $118 million deal.

== Sports ownership ==
Nutting became the sixth principal owner in Pirates history on January 12, 2007. He has served as chairman of the board and represented his family's interest in the club since 2002. The Nutting family had become the largest shareholders in the Pirates at some point after 2005 (the exact date is not known publicly since the Pirates are privately held), and eventually acquired controlling interest. However, Kevin McClatchy remained CEO and operating head of the franchise until the end of the 2007 season.

Nutting led the construction of the Pirates' new training academy in the Dominican Republic, which had its grand opening on April 30, 2009. The facility was built on a 46-acre site just outside Santo Domingo, and included two full fields, a half field, batting cages, clubhouses, dorm rooms and class rooms. In 2007, he had also led the efforts to modernize Pirate City and McKechnie Field, the Pirates' spring training facilities in Bradenton, Florida. Pirate City improvements included a new dormitory, clubhouse, staff offices, enhanced training/rehab facilities and a fifth field. Lights were installed at McKechnie Field, making night baseball possible there for the first time in 2008. In order to take further advantage of the upgraded facilities, Nutting led the purchase of a Florida State League franchise, the Bradenton Marauders. The addition of the Class A-Advanced affiliate was part of an effort to further the development of Pirates minor league players, in addition to rehabilitation assignments for major league players. The Marauders won the Florida State League title in 2016.

The highlight of Nutting's tenure as owner of the Pirates to date has been the three-year period from 2013 to 2015 when Pittsburgh compiled a 280–206 record (.576 winning percentage). It was the second-best mark in Major League Baseball during that period behind only N.L. Central Division rival St. Louis (287–199). The Pirates captured an N.L. Wild Card spot each of those three seasons. In 2013, they compiled a 94–68 mark and defeated Cincinnati in the Wild Card Game before losing to St. Louis in the Division Series, three games to two. Pittsburgh went 88–74 and 98–64 during the regular season in 2014 and 2015, but lost to San Francisco and Chicago respectively in the Wild Card Game. The Pirates hosted all three of those Wild Card contests at PNC Park.

After the Pirates' 2013 season, Nutting was named Newsmaker of the Year by the Pittsburgh Business Times.

Nutting is also chairman of the Pirates' philanthropic arm, Pirates Charities, which constructs baseball and softball fields for youth in the Pittsburgh region and Bradenton, Florida, through its Miracle League and Fields for Kids programs. Pirates Charities also supports military families and veterans as well as those who are battling cancer.

=== Criticism ===
Due to Nutting's perceived tendency to put profits ahead of a competitive product on the field, he is often ranked in both the local press and nationally as one of the worst owners in sports, earning the nickname "Bottom-Line Bob". Despite Nutting being the 10th richest owner in MLB, the Pirates have constantly been in the bottom third of payroll under his direct ownership and that of his predecessor and former business partner Kevin McClatchy when Nutting was a minority partner. Following McClatchy turning away Dallas Mavericks owner and Mt. Lebanon native Mark Cuban from buying the team around the time the Nutting family was becoming majority owners, Nutting has also turned down bids by Pittsburgh Penguins owners Mario Lemieux & Ron Burkle, as well as Pittsburgh Steelers minority owner Thomas Tull, insisting that the team isn't for sale.

He has been the subject of harsh criticism due to trades the team made in the 2017–2018 offseason, moving pitcher Gerrit Cole to the Houston Astros, and centerfielder Andrew McCutchen to the San Francisco Giants in an apparent fire sale. Following the two trades, Pirates fans launched a petition drive on Change.org demanding Nutting sell the team to someone who spend what was necessary to be competitive. The McCutchen trade did net pitcher Kyle Crick and outfielder Bryan Reynolds. Crick made 116 appearances as a late-inning reliever for the Pirates in 2018 and 2019, and Reynolds finished 7th in the N.L. batting race with a .314 mark as a rookie in 2019. The Pirates' trades, along with allegations of similar "salary dumps" by the Miami Marlins, led to the Major League Baseball Players Association (MLBPA) to accuse both teams of failing to use revenue sharing funds to improve the team's on-field performance, as required in the collective bargaining agreement. On February 23, 2018, MLBPA filed a formal grievance with MLB against the Pirates, Marlins, Oakland Athletics, and Tampa Bay Rays over the teams misuse of revenue sharing funds. MLB responded that the claims had "no merit." The grievance did not result in a hearing. Miami (63–98) was the only team named in the grievance to post a losing record in 2018. Oakland went 97–65 and captured an A.L. Wild Card spot, while Tampa Bay (90–72) and Pittsburgh (82–79) finished above .500.

On February 1, 2018, it was reported by the Pittsburgh Post-Gazette that the Weirton Medical Center, a major advertiser for three of Nutting's papers (Weirton Daily Times in Weirton, West Virginia, Herald-Star in Steubenville, Ohio, and The Review in East Liverpool, Ohio), were pulling its ads from the papers over "the failure of the Pirates to craft a deal to keep Andrew McCutchen a Pirate."

On April 10, 2022, two days before the Pirates home opener, the Post-Gazette published a report based on Pirates financial data (publicly available due to the team's lease with Allegheny County) that showed the team's player payroll was strictly tied to ticket sales and concession stand revenue. The newspaper’s investigation found that all TV revenue, MLB revenue sharing, and profits from concession sales after payroll was kept as net profits for Nutting. This story was published as the Pirates had the fourth-lowest payroll in MLB at the start of the 2022 season, less than half of their National League Central rival, the Cincinnati Reds—whose fans criticized owner Bob Castellini for cutting payroll in 2022. That prompted longtime sports talk show host Mark Madden to suggest that the Sports & Exhibition Authority of Pittsburgh and Allegheny County to force Nutting to spend to the MLB average as a condition of renewing the team's lease with PNC Park in 2030. On August 3, 2022, a fan took a photo with Nutting wearing a shirt (made and sold by the website of Pittsburgh native Pat McAfee) with the words "Sell The Team", which quickly went viral and was popular with many Pirates fans who shared his sentiments.

As of 2025, the Pirates have not made the playoffs since 2015, the second-longest drought in MLB, and finished either 4th or 5th in the division each of the last eight years.

== Ogden Newspapers, Inc. ==
Nutting serves as the president and CEO of Ogden Newspapers, Inc. headquartered in Wheeling, West Virginia. He is the great-grandson of company founder H. C. Ogden, and is the fourth generation of his family to run the company. Ogden Newspapers publishes 40 daily newspapers, multiple weekly newspapers and magazines as well as many phone directories. The company has newspapers and other media forms in 12 states.

== Seven Springs Mountain Resort ==
Nutting is the former chairman of Seven Springs Mountain Resort, a four-season resort located approximately 50 miles (80 km) southeast of Pittsburgh. In late 2013, Nutting acquired nearby Hidden Valley Resort when it was purchased by Seven Springs. It was announced on December 31, 2021, that all resorts under the Seven Springs Mountain Resort umbrella (Seven Springs, Hidden Valley, and Laurel Mountain Ski Area would be sold to Vail Resorts in a $118 million deal.

== Personal life ==
Nutting was born on March 29, 1962, in Wheeling, West Virginia. He earned a bachelor's degree in history from Williams College in Williamstown, Massachusetts. Nutting and his wife, Leslie, have three daughters.

Preceded by Kevin McClatchy	Owner of the Pittsburgh Pirates; 2007–present	Succeeded by current
