= The Alpena News =

- Type: Daily newspaper
- Format: Broadsheet
- Owner: Ogden Newspapers
- Publisher: William Speer
- Editor: Steve Murch
- Founded: 1899
- Headquarters: 130 Park Place, Alpena 49707
- Circulation: 5,918 Daily (as of 2022)
- Website: thealpenanews.com

The Alpena News is a general daily newspaper in the city of Alpena, Michigan in the United States. It is published by Ogden Newspapers Inc. News reports are available on line. The paper was founded in 1899. (Note: Another source erroneously claims the founding was in 1909. In fact, that was the year that The Alpena News was incorporated by James Collins, W. R. Roberson and Thomas J. Ferguson.) The paper currently has between 20 and 50 employees.

It is the newspaper of record for Alpena County. The circulation area of the Alpena News covers much of Northern Michigan, with a particular emphasis on counties in the northeast lower peninsula.

== History ==
On August 1, 1899, E.S. Meers began publishing The Alpena Evening News. It was renamed as The Alpena News in 1914.

In its early years it was edited by James Collins, a fiery and opinionated Irishman, who continued as editor until 1909 when he then edited the Alpena Argus-Pioneer.

Alpena had many papers initially. There have been at least a dozen papers (some are name changes) over the years. In 1900, there were two dailies, the Echo and the News; and three weeklies, Alpena Weekly Argus, Farmer and Pioneer. The News was left as the sole survivor by 1918.

The Alpena News is owned by Ogden Newspapers, which includes Escanaba's Daily Press, Houghton's The Daily Mining Gazette, Iron Mountain Daily News, Marquette's The Mining Journal, and Discover.

== Sources ==
- Law, John Wesley; Law, Deloris A. (1975). Home Was Alpena. Alpena, Michigan: Village Press. ISBN 978-1-60307-240-3.
