= Wayside Theatre =

- U.S. Historic district – Contributing property
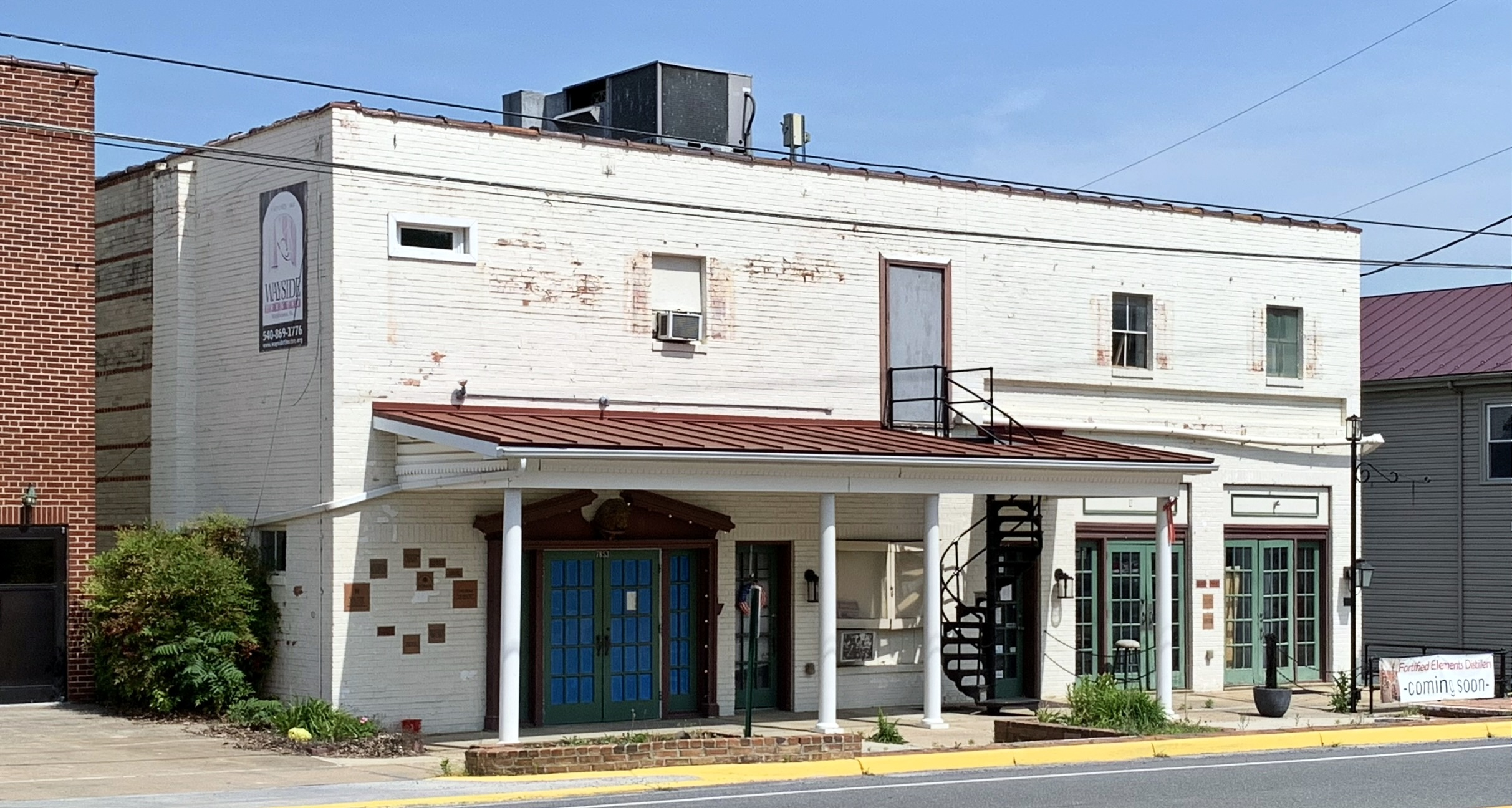
- The former Wayside Theatre in 2023
- Location: 7853 Main Street; Middletown, Virginia, USA
- Coordinates: 39.028864°N 78.279034°W
- Built: 1946
- Part of: Middletown Historic District
- Designated CP: June 23, 2003

Wayside Theatre is a former regional theatre located at 7853 Main Street in Middletown, Virginia, United States. The theatre company began after businessman and philanthropist Leo M. Bernstein purchased the property, along with the nearby Wayside Inn and other buildings in the surrounding area. The building had previously operated as a movie theatre from the time it was constructed in 1946 until 1961. The professional theatre company staged its first performance in 1963 and operated for 50 years before abruptly closing in 2013 due to financial troubles. At the time of its closing, Wayside was the second oldest professional theatre in Virginia.

There is often confusion about the early history of Wayside Theatre, with most people having been told the theatre was founded in 1961 and that the original company was called the Maralarrick Players. No evidence has been found for any group by that name performing at Wayside and the first performance of the theatre company took place in June 1963, as was noted by news articles at the time. During its history, Wayside Theatre was led by eight artistic directors, the first being Larry Gleason. The last, Warner Crocker, served as artistic director for the longest period.

During its opening season, Peter Boyle was among the actors who performed at Wayside. In the following years, other actors who would eventually become stars in film, television, and on Broadway appeared at Wayside Theatre, including Chris Sarandon and his then-wife Susan Sarandon, Cathryn Damon, Donna McKechnie, Sam Gold, and Clark Middleton, among others. Kathy Bates appeared in Wayside's traveling company, Wayside Theatre on Tour, early in her career.

Most of the productions at Wayside were well received by critics. For the majority of its history, Wayside hired from the Actors' Equity Association, except during periods of financial troubles in the 1980s and from 2011 until the theatre closed. The small building was not designed to be an acting theatre. There were renovations throughout the years, but a planned expansion that would have added a second theatre and additional backstage space was cancelled due to effects from the Great Recession.

The economic downturn later spiraled into a worsening financial situation for Wayside. After years of lower ticket sales, a reduction in grants and other funding, and the expenses of a needed renovation that was completed in 2008, Wayside board members closed the theatre in August 2013. Since that time, the theatre has remained mostly vacant. The building is one of many contributing properties to the Middletown Historic District, which was listed on the National Register of Historic Places and Virginia Landmarks Register in 2003.

== History ==
=== Pre-theatre site history ===
The site at 7853 Main Street in Middletown, Virginia was first owned by John Campbell in the late-18th century and later transferred to Jacob Danner. A building was constructed on the property which housed a tavern and store, the Danner Hotel and the Storehouse. The building later became the Shenandoah Normal School before the teaching college relocated to nearby Reliance, Virginia. In the early-20th century, the town hall and town jail, a dry cleaner, and a barbershop occupied the building. In 1941 the property was destroyed in a fire. At the time, it housed Little & Larrick's Store, a restaurant owned by Ed Goode, and a store owned by Ed Sperry. The site remained empty for the next three years.

In 1946 Herschel C. Borden constructed the current building, which was known as the Bordon-Lee Theatre or Middletown Movie Theatre until 1961. The building was subdivided, with the first floor containing the movie theatre, a pharmacy, and a store. The second floor contained an apartment in the back of the building where Borden lived for several years. There was also an office in the front portion of the second floor where Bob O'Neil practiced law. The office was later converted into another apartment. The space where the pharmacy was located later housed offices for the town government and police department. During this time the basement level housed a barbershop, a beauty shop run by a reported alcoholic who later disappeared, and an alleged betting parlor. The film projection system and theatre seats were sold to local movie theatres around two years after Joe Dwyer purchased the property in 1959.

On February 22, 1962, Dwyer sold the property to Leo M. Bernstein, a real estate developer, banker, and philanthropist from Washington, D.C. Bernstein had previously purchased and restored the nearby Wayside Inn, a historic building and the namesake of Wayside Theatre which opened as a tavern in 1797, and restored numerous other properties in the area including the Hotel Strasburg, Stonewall Jackson Museum, and Crystal Caverns in Strasburg, the Battletown Inn in Berryville, and the Burwell-Morgan Mill in Millwood.

=== Theatre company ===
==== Opening season ====
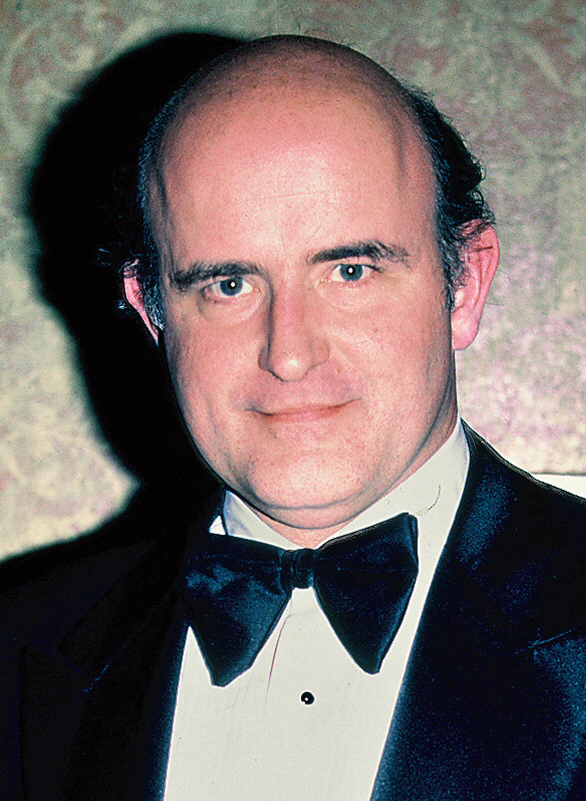
Peter Boyle is one of several actors who performed during the Wayside Theatre's opening season.

Many sources, citing the Wayside Theatre's playbills, list the theatre's founding taking place in 1961 as the Maralarrick Players (sometimes spelled Marralarrick Players). According to James H. Laster, a historian, retired professor, and former Wayside Theatre actor who has extensively researched the theatre's history, there is no evidence of any group named the Maralarrick Players ever performing at the building. Two possible explanations are there was a local stock company that performed in 1962 or the group was based out of the Wayside Inn, but Laster has stated: "Therefore, to date, no documentation can be located that gives any definitive information about the Marralarrick group, what they performed, the name of their director, or how they came to be in Middletown."

After Bernstein's purchase, extensive renovations took place for the building to house a theatre company. Advertisements announcing the theatre's opening began appearing in newspapers in 1963 with one advertisement stating "See these Broadway shows performed by a professional New York cast, including [Mitch Miller's daughter] Andrea Miller." The theatre opened on Tuesday night June 18, 1963, the beginning of an 11-week, 9-play season. The first play performed at the theatre, featuring members of the Actors' Equity Association, was Neil Simon's Come Blow Your Horn. Larry Gleason, Wayside's first artistic director, had previously worked at Arena Stage and the Theater Lobby. Gleason's former coworker, Zelda Fichandler of Arena Stage, was a member of Wayside's advisory board.

Attendees during the first season received a 12-page playbill. In addition to the company's biographical information, the playbill included a statement by Gleason:

Summer Theater is an adventure. The Wayside Theater is proud to be a part of this adventure. Our season is ambitious, but every adventure is fueled with the same fire. During our first season you shall meet many people on our stage, we trust you will welcome their work. As you travel from Maine to Pennsylvania, many summer theaters spring up in front of you. We at Wayside are proud to bring summer theater to Northern Virginia. This area, rich in history past, seemed a natural spot for such a theater. During the season you will find something that will please you, whatever your taste. You will be amused or impressed or even amazed. You will spend an evening with Shaw and Tennessee Williams. You will see the old, the new, the borrowed and the ‘blue’. We are glad to welcome you to this adventure. Won’t you join us many times this summer?

Mitch Miller, who at the time hosted the television show Sing Along with Mitch, drew considerable attention from local media when he visited the area to see his daughter perform. Before the season began, Andre had served as marshall of that year's Shenandoah Apple Blossom Festival Fireman's Parade. She and fellow actor Jane Lowry shared a room at the Wayside Inn during the season while many of the company and staff lived in apartments above the theatre.

After Come Blow Your Horn, plays performed during the 1963 season included Charley's Aunt, Summer and Smoke starring Peter Boyle and Lowry, Bus Stop, Light Up the Sky, The Fantasticks, The Drunkard, Misalliance, and Two for the Seesaw. The first year was so successful that Gleason extended the season by one month, adding four plays to the roster. Among these additions were Under the Yum-Yum Tree, Dial M For Murder, and Bell, Book and Candle. After the last performance of the season, attendees walked onto the stage to congratulate the actors.

==== 1964-1969 ====
The theatre was renovated between the 1963 and 1964 seasons. The exterior was painted white and decorative elements including shutters, awnings, urns, and a spiral staircase were added to the façade. The interior was renovated by stage designer Thomas (Tom) McKeehan. The stage was expanded, which allowed a larger array of performances, a new lighting system was installed, and additional seats were added, bringing the total seat capacity to 276.

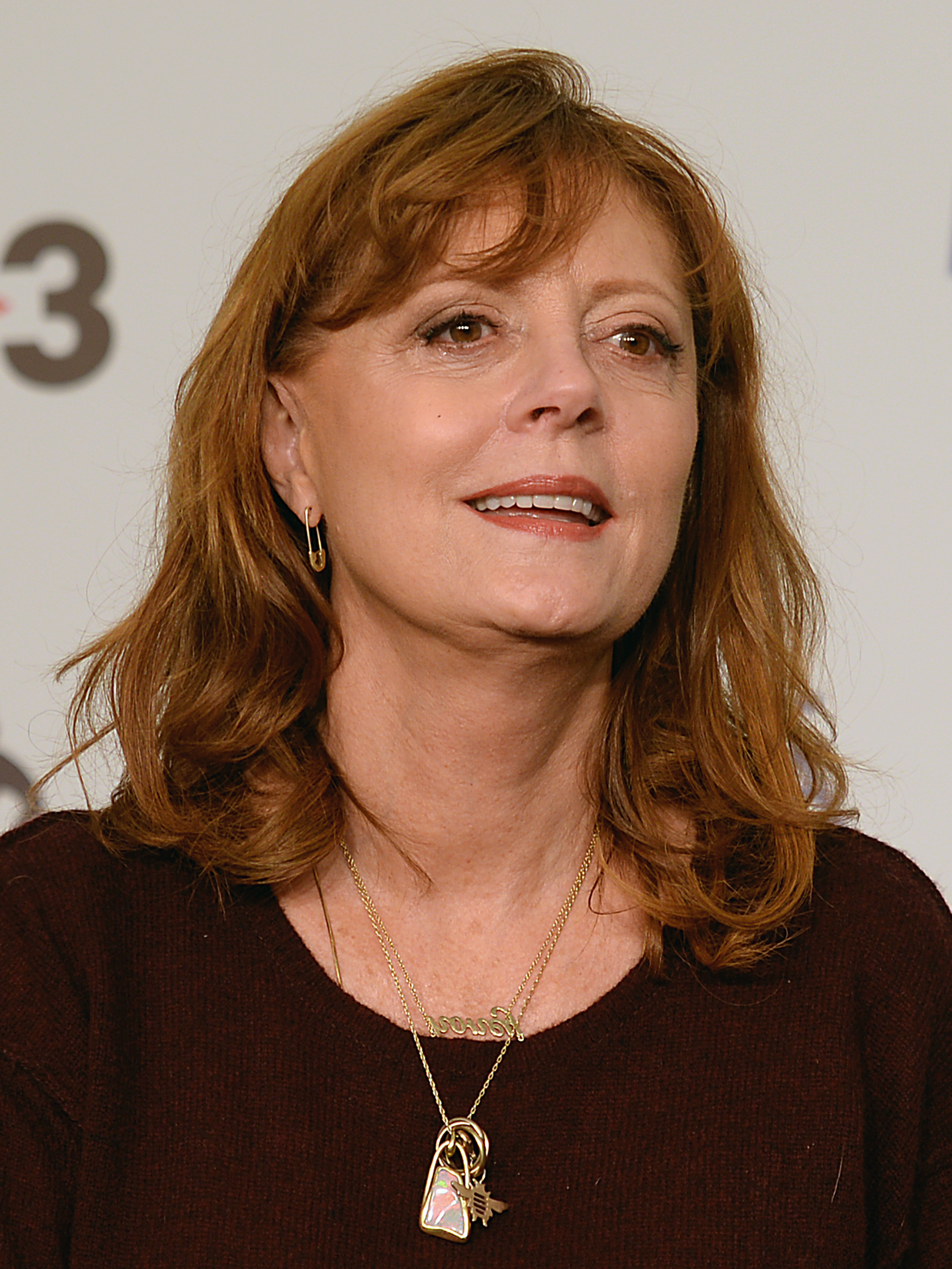
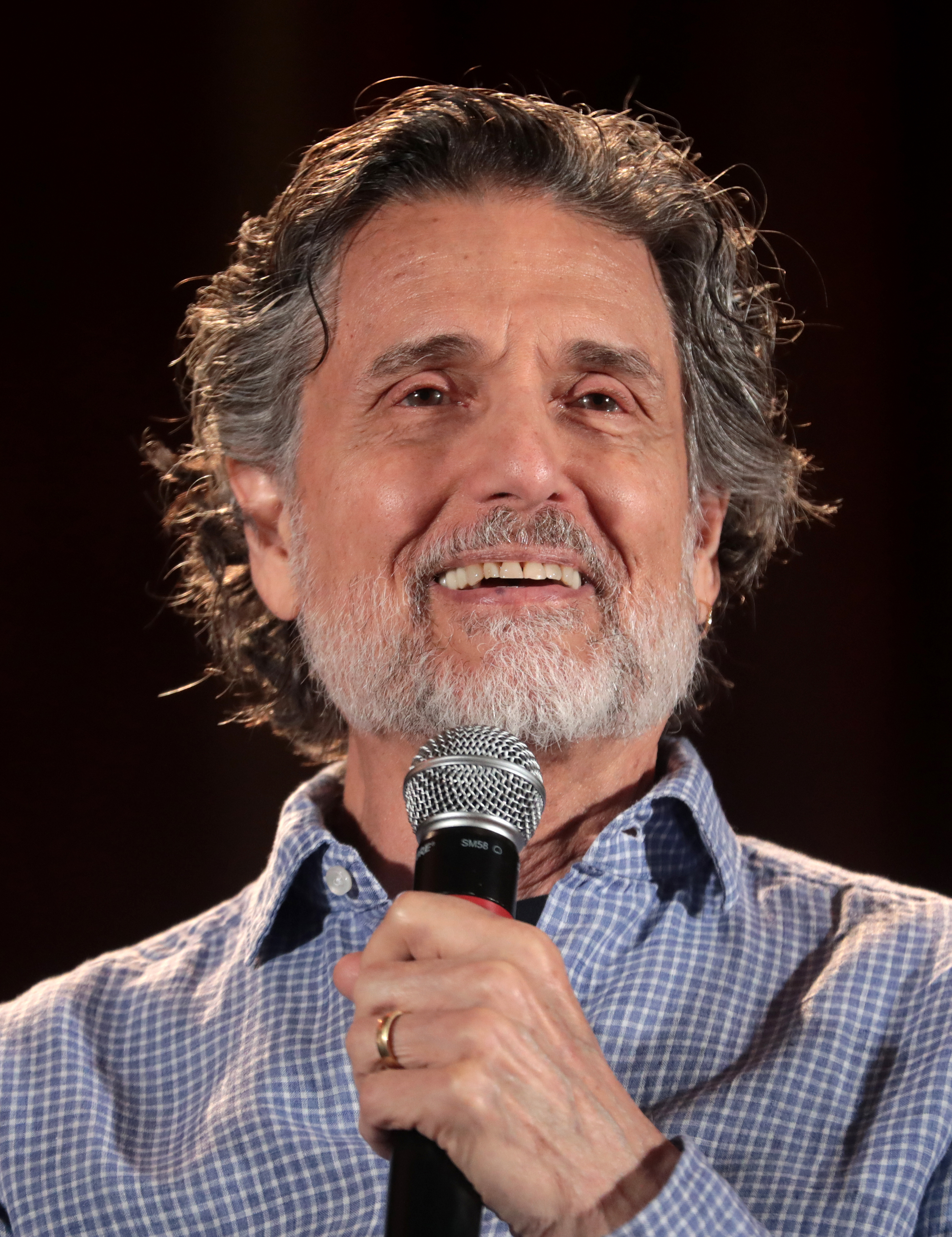
Susan Sarandon and her then-husband, Chris Sarandon, performed at Wayside during the 1968 season.

Owen Phillips, who had previously served as production director of the Barter Theater, was named Wayside Theatre's new artistic director for the 1964 season, the first of four seasons he would lead the company. To promote the theatre, Phillips appeared in front of local civic groups and spoke at public events. Echoing the plans made by Bernstein, he advertised the theatre as a place to visit during the busy tourist season, which runs from May through autumn in the area surrounding Skyline Drive. A bus tour company from Washington, D.C., offered a weekend excursion package that included a stay at the Wayside Inn, a ticket to the theatre, and meals, along with visits to Harpers Ferry, West Virginia, all for $33.25 per person. Attendees at the opening night of The Pursuit of Happiness in 1964 included Luci Baines Johnson, daughter of President Lyndon B. Johnson. Similar to what happened in 1963, the 1964 season was extended, this time to November.

Between the 1964 and 1965 seasons a new arc spot light was installed and a grand curtain was added. A gallery featuring works from local artists was added to the second floor. Along the hallway to the gallery were photographs of previous performances at the theatre. The gallery was later moved downstairs to the space that would later become the Curtain Call Cafe in 1968, which was decorated with Tudor-style wood paneling and glass lamps.

During the remainder of the decade, the theatre's reputation grew considerably. Local media provided reviews of each new play and Bernstein assisted in promoting the inn and theatre. Bernstein brought a group of government officials and business leaders from Washington, D.C., to attend a performance in 1965. That same year Bernstein and Phillips established the Wayside Foundation for the Arts. Ownership of the theatre was transferred to the nonprofit for $1 while Bernstein retained ownership of the inn. Harold Herman and Lindé Hayen were among the theatre's actors in 1965. They would later establish the theatre program at Shenandoah College and the Shenandoah Conservatory of Music, before the two schools were merged to form Shenandoah University.

The opening night for each season was a black-tie event, often attended by notable members of the media along with government officials from Washington, D.C. Attendees at these events included journalist Merriman Smith, Senator Estes Kefauver, Dutch Ambassador Carl Willem Alwin Schurmann, and White House official James W. Symington. Special events held at the theatre during this time included a fundraiser for the restoration of Middletown's St. Thomas Chapel and a mobile art gallery outside the building featuring works donated by Paul Mellon to the Virginia Museum of Fine Arts. An acting workshop was also created with Phillips and the theatre's actors serving as teachers. Attendees, apprentices, and locals would stage a performance at the conclusion of the workshop.

Phillips left Wayside at the conclusion of the 1967 season and returned to the Barter Theatre. He is credited with the success of Wayside during its early years. Gerald Slavet was hired as the new artistic director and, like Phillips, appeared before local civic groups to advertise the theatre. Slavet's group ensemble, The Garrick Players, were among the actors during his first year after the five members had been evicted from their space at Grace Episcopal Church in Washington, D.C. The 1968 season was postponed due to the assassination of Senator Robert F. Kennedy and the national observance that followed. Prior to the season opening, directed by James Waring, the theatre's lighting and sound equipment had been rebuilt and Herb White, who Bernstein hired to restore the inn, also remodeled the theatre.

In addition to Boyle and Lowry, notable actors that performed at the theatre during the 1960s include Chris Sarandon and his then-wife, Susan Sarandon, Nancy Barrett and her husband, David Ford, Jerry Lacy, and Cathryn Damon. Plays performed at Wayside during this timeframe include Bye Bye Birdie, A Streetcar Named Desire, Mary, Mary, The Women, The Odd Couple, Dracula, and Who's Afraid of Virginia Woolf?.

==== 1970s ====
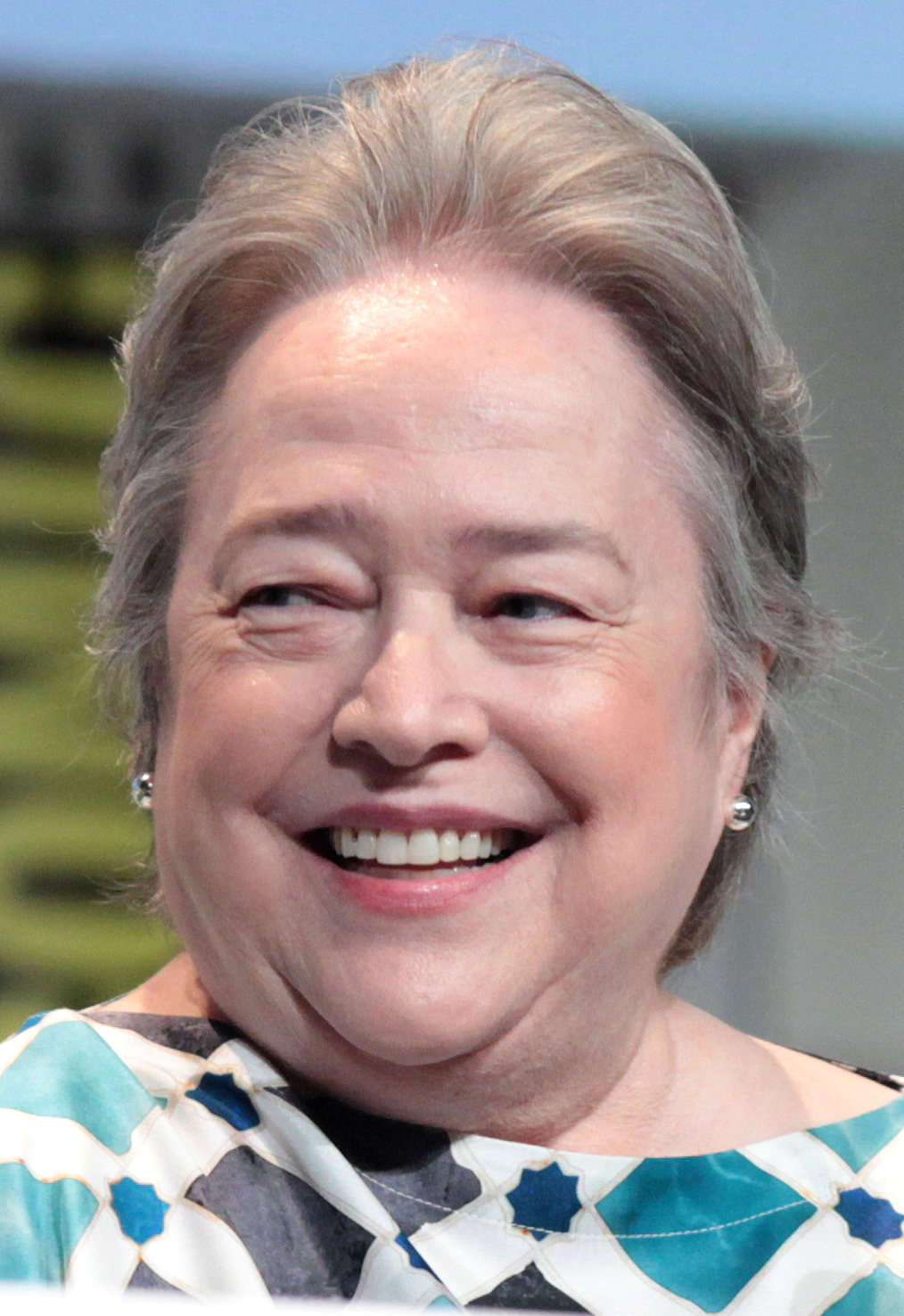
Kathy Bates performed in Wayside's traveling company, Wayside Theatre on Tour (WTOT), in 1973.

Slavet continued his tenure as artistic director at Wayside Theatre into the early 1970s. In 1971 actors from Story Book Theatre, a comedic play that was running on Broadway, traveled to Middletown for a one-night only performance at the theatre. It was "the first time that members of the cast of a currently running Broadway hit, which opened to universally rave reviews, have made such an appearance simultaneously with the show's Broadway run." The actors who performed that night included Hamilton Camp, Lewis Arquette, Richard Libertini, Melinda Dillon, and Paul Sand.

That same year W. Raymond Jennings oversaw renovation work that included installation of a brick terrace, fencing, kiosk, and an outdoor seating area. One event that took place during a 1971 performance of Play It Again, Sam attracted media attention due to the attendance of a group of a few dozen inmates from a local prison. Local Rotarians had organized the outing for inmates. One of the members told a reporter "We were not motivated by any feeling of charity toward the convicts, but we saw the need, the need for any diversion from the daily bind of working on the highways, the need for communication, and the need for understanding where they stood in relation to society." Slavet directed two plays at Shenandoah College and the Shenandoah Conservatory of Music in a joint venture that saw students earn credits for drama performances. He also reportedly taught five theatre courses at nearby Lord Fairfax Community College (now Laurel Ridge Community College).

By 1972 additional staff were required at the theatre. Barbara Swink was hired as the general manager and Helen Royall as a secretary, roles both women served for several years. That year Wayside celebrated its 10-year anniversary, based on the premise the Maralarrick Players had performed in 1962, which was the subject of many news articles praising the theatre and noting its importance to the local cultural scene. Organizations that provided financial support to the theatre were also noted, including the National Foundation on the Arts and the Humanities, the Virginia Commission for the Arts (VCA), the Andrew W. Mellon Foundation, and the Armstrong Foundation.

Slavet announced his resignation in early 1974, but he was convinced to stay and assist planning the upcoming season. His tenure was noted as being successful in increasing attendance, broadening community outreach, and creating the theatre's tour company, Wayside Theatre on Tour (WTOT), which existed until the early 2000s. The tour company was founded in 1971 and performed at various venues, often schools. Their 1973 season proved to be very successful, with WTOT performing at 122 locations between Virginia and New York, attended by an estimated 50,000 people. Among WTOT's five members that year were Kathy Bates (credited as "Bobo Bates") and Dan Gilvezan.

A planned renovation of the theatre in 1974 was postponed due to the need for actor housing. In 1974 Bernstein purchased the nearby Old Dominion Motel on U.S. Route 11 to house the actors, a living arrangement that continued for several years. In later years actors lived in a house across the street from the theatre before a larger house down the block was purchased.

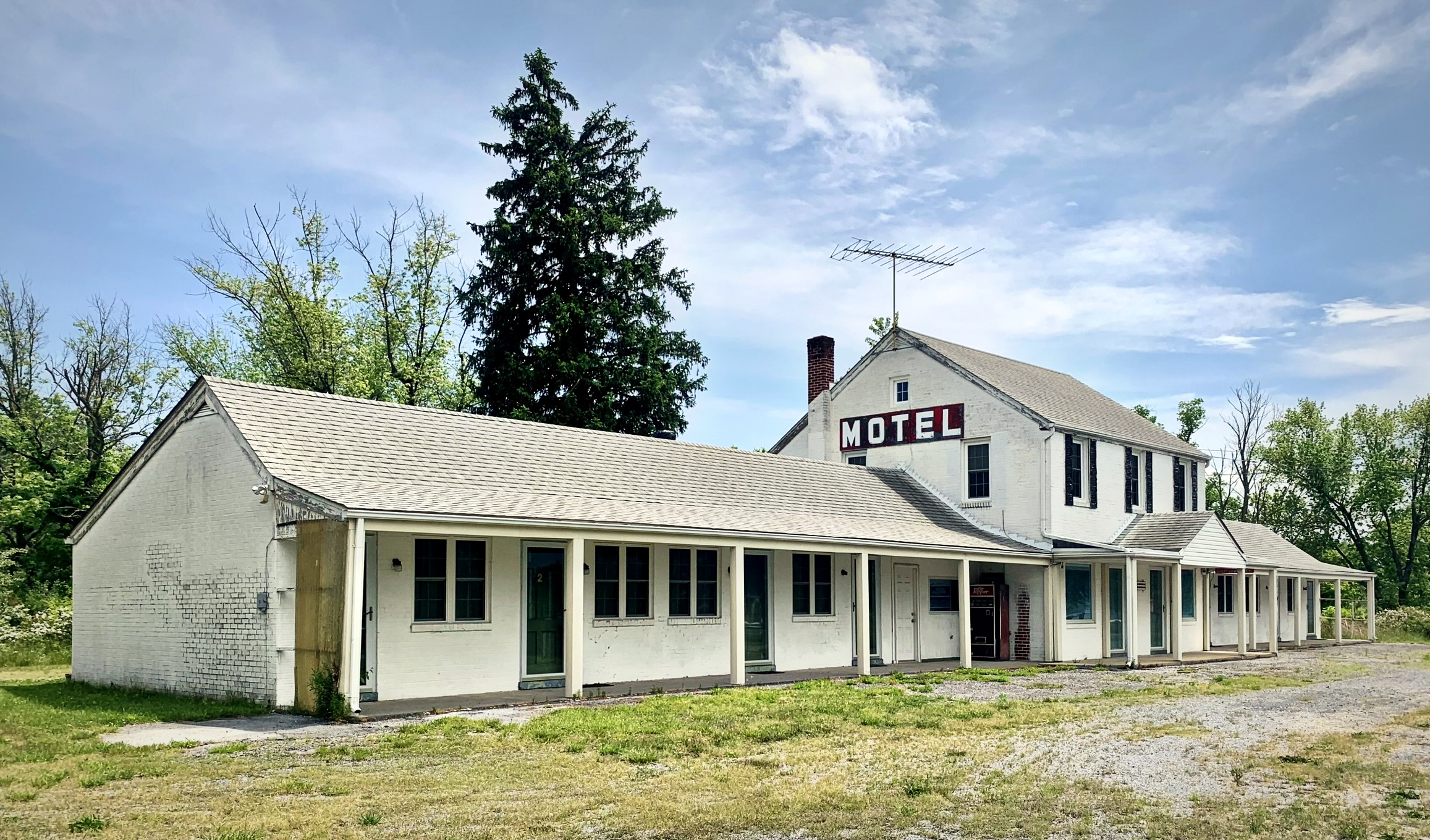
The former Old Dominion Motel where some of the Wayside actors were housed in the 1970s.

Lou Furman took over as artistic director in 1975, but his first year was not always a success. Several plays were criticized for less than stellar acting, costuming, set design, and for technical issues. One positive aspect of Furman's first year was the continued success of the WTOT, which he oversaw. Furman received additional criticism for his handling of the company during the first half of his second year, with local media continuing to notice faults in play selection and technical details. His third and final year as artistic director saw Furman receive some praise, especially his choice to hire William Koch, who directed five plays during the 1977 season. Furman announced his resignation in late 1977.

James Kirkland, who previously worked at the Virginia Museum Theatre, took over the role as artistic director in January 1978. The opening play for the 1978 season, Round and Round the Garden, was directed by Davey Marlin-Jones and praised by critics. Most of the 1978 season was considered successful. In addition to Marlin-Jones, guest directors included Keith Fowler. In December 1978 the theatre presented its first performance of A Christmas Carol which proved immensely popular and became a Wayside tradition. Despite that season's positive reception, the theatre needed additional funds to remain in operation, which locals and regional groups attempted to raise. The VCA provided grants in 1979, helping to ensure another season at Wayside. Due to high gasoline prices during the 1979 oil crisis, the theatre provided a van to pick up attendees from the Handley Library in Winchester. The decade ended with Swink retiring as general manager and Edward Steele taking over the role as artistic director.

Actors who performed at Wayside in the 1970s, in addition to the aforementioned group from Story Book Theatre, include Cara Duff-MacCormick, whose mother accepted her Theatre World Award while her daughter was performing at Wayside, future Tony Award-winner Donna McKechnie, Richard Bauer, Ken Olfson, and Tandy Cronyn, daughter of Jessica Tandy and Hume Cronyn. John Lee Beatty, who later in life won Tony Awards for scenic design, served as the theatre's set designer from 1972 to 1974 and also presented a puppet show called "Puppet Personalities". Some of the plays performed at Wayside during that decade include A Funny Thing Happened on the Way to the Forum, You're a Good Man, Charlie Brown, Irma La Douce, Cat on a Hot Tin Roof, Once Upon a Mattress, and Hamlet.

==== 1980s ====
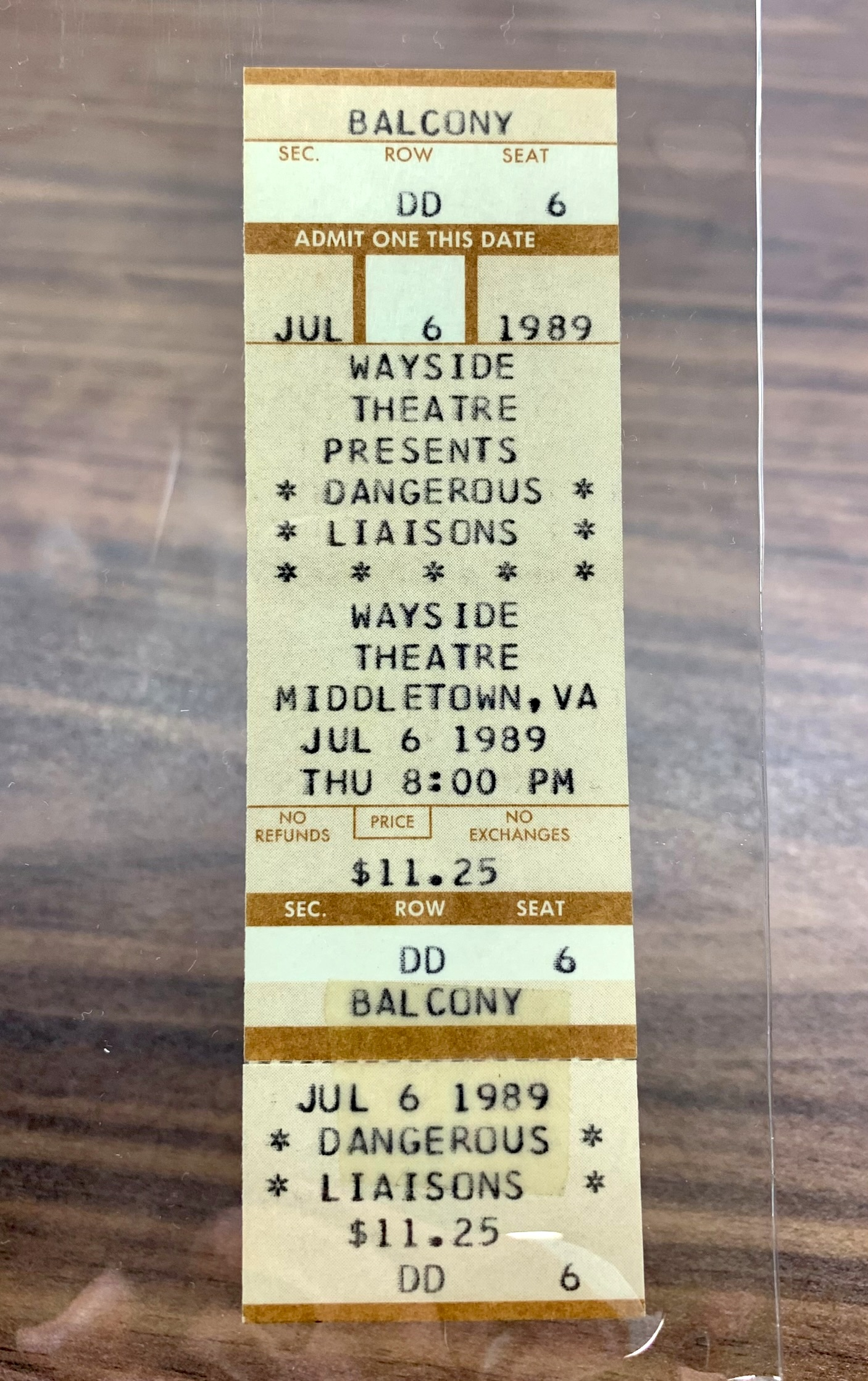
A ticket for the 1989 staging of Les Liaisons Dangereuses (Dangerous Liaisons)

One of the first things Steele had to address as new artistic director was a budget deficit. It was revealed under Kirkman, the deficit had grown from $10,000 to more than $80,000, partly because of an unsuccessful venture of planned William Shakespeare performances that proved unpopular and cost $30,000 to produce. Steele and members of the board began a fundraising campaign. It was also decided in order to cut expenses, the season would only include three plays, each performed by only two actors with minimal set designs, in addition to the annual Christmas show. WTOT continued to operate, which brought in much-needed revenue.

The 1981 season was a success, with each new play receiving acclaim from critics, despite the cost-cutting measure of hiring non-Equity performers. A new feature that began in 1981 were cabaret performances held in the Curtain Call Cafe. In recognition of Wayside's 20th anniversary, which the theatre celebrated in 1982, congratulatory messages were sent from state politicians, including Governor Chuck Robb, Senator Harry F. Byrd Jr., State Senator William Truban, and Delegate Andy Guest. The next several seasons, which saw Steele and guest director George Black both perform on stage, received praise from critics. Each season included six plays and ended with the annual Christmas series.

In 1985 Wayside hosted a two-show event at John Handley High School in Winchester, featuring Johnny Cash and his wife, June Carter Cash. A major change that took place in 1986 was Wayside once again becoming an Equity theatre, which allowed for the hiring of more experienced actors. At the end of the 1986 season, Steele announced his resignation as artistic director and Christopher Owens was named his replacement.

Owens wanted to extend the season from its standard summer schedule to nine months, but for the 1987 seasons, the schedule remained the same. One of the successful ventures that year was the Mystery Tour, also known as the Mystery Dinner-Theatre, which was extended due to popular demand. For the following season, the schedule was extended to its longest yet and light remodeling took place, including new carpeting and paint, rearranged seating, and a renovation of the cafe. Prior to the 1988 season opening performance, a reception held in the cafe was attended by Marlin-Jones and actors from The Guiding Light. Despite some good performances, the 1988 season received mixed reviews from critics.

After receiving a grant from the VCA, the theatre's company was expanded. Mark Lewis, who played Kurt Corday in The Guiding Light, also guest starred at Wayside that season. Renovations that took place before the season began include expansion of both restrooms, rearrangement of the balcony seating, and rebuilding the stage. Ornate cast-iron theatre seats dating from 1927 were also found in the basement. A fundraising campaign to restore each of the 185 seats soon began. The final season of the 1980s was well received, except for the production of Filthy Rich, which was panned by critics. Plays performed at Wayside during the 1980s include Same Time, Next Year, Deathtrap, On Golden Pond, The Glass Menagerie, Agnes of God, The Good Doctor, and Les Liaisons Dangereuses (Dangerous Liaisons).

==== 1990s ====
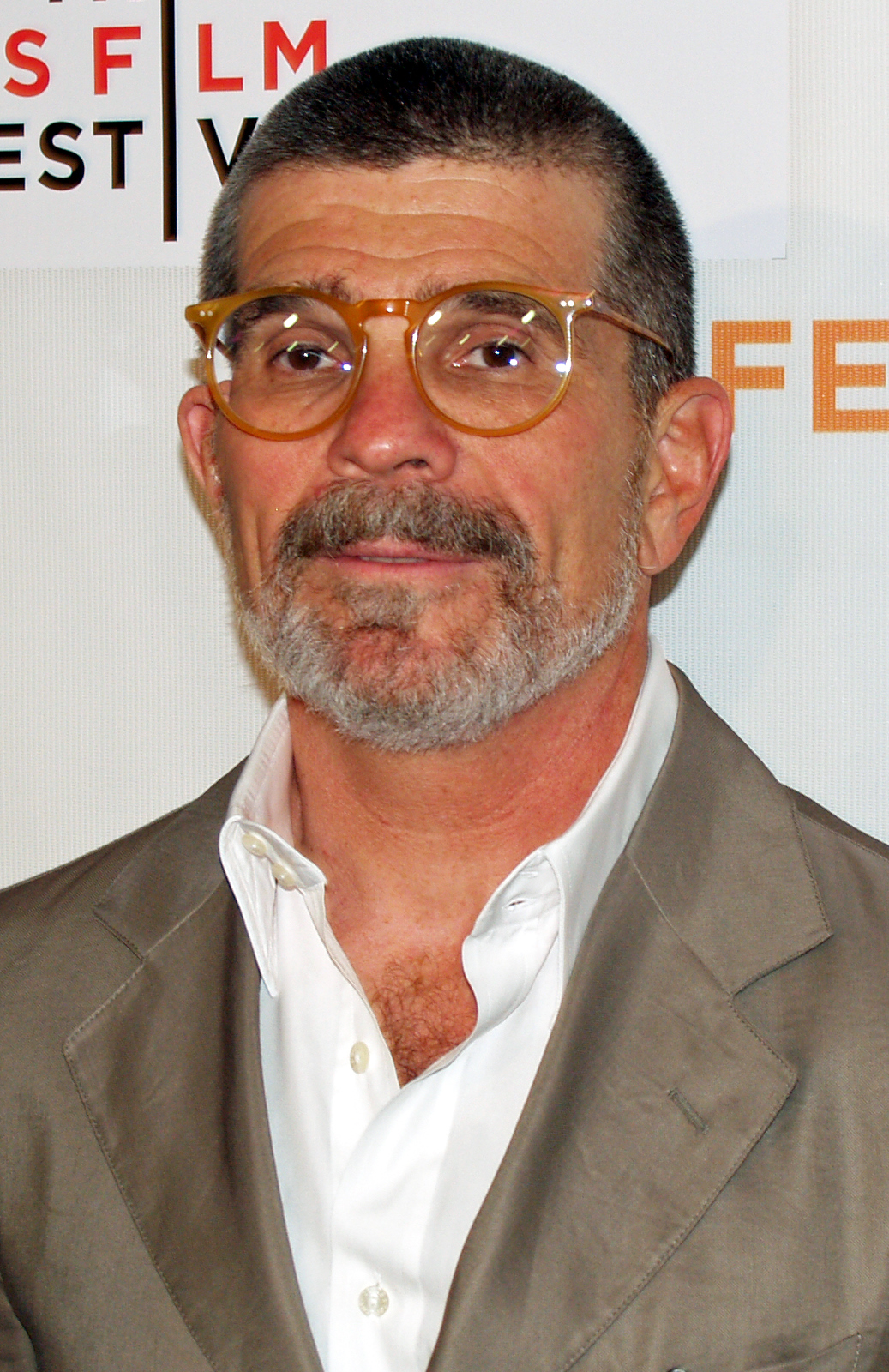
Oleanna, by David Mamet, was staged at Wayside in 1993. It was reportedly the first time a regional production took place while a play was still on Broadway.

The opening play of the 1990 season, Romance/Romance, featured two soap opera actors, David Buffam and Catherine Cooper, the latter having also starred in A Chorus Line on Broadway. The performances that season received praise from critics, especially Driving Miss Daisy, but it was noted in reviews from Romance/Romance, that due to sexual innuendos used in the script, "many ticketholders not only didn’t return for the second act but some left after it began." The following season began with a 30th anniversary gala held at the Wayside Inn. A major change that took place in 1991 was the schedule being changed from 10 weeks to 25 weeks, a goal of Owens, which resulted in a 20% increase in attendance. Due to continued financial constraints, the number of works performed by WTOT was reduced to one and the number of guest directors at Wayside was also reduced. Owens was often singled out in reviews that season, praising him along with the actors for a successful year.

Instead of the standard six plays performed each season in addition to the Christmas show, there were seven in 1992. A new audio system, new stage curtain, and new drapes for the stage were added that season. Amadeus was lauded by critics and is noted as being "perhaps one of the most expensive in Wayside’s history and perhaps one of the most beautiful" due to the cast of 19 actors, the almost three dozen period costumes and wigs that were used, an elaborate stage design, and music.

Due to Owens' friendship with a Broadway agent associated with David Mamet, Wayside was able to stage Oleanna. An article in The Winchester Star noted "For the first time, the second-oldest theatre company in the state, will stage the first regional production of a major Broadway hit." It was also reportedly "the first time that a regional production of a play would be playing while it is still running on Broadway." The two-person play starred John Michalski, who had appeared on Broadway and General Hospital, and Cheryl Gaysunas.

To advertise the 1994 season opening of Nunsense, two of the actors rode a scooter in that year's Apple Blossom Parade dressed as nuns. Among the productions that year was A Few Good Men, which was co-produced with Mill Mountain Theatre, the first time Wayside had staged a co-production with another company. This allowed the two theatres to split the cost of the expensive production. Later that year a champagne and chip reception was held at the Route 11 Potato Chips factory, which was located in Middletown at that time.

During the 1995 season Wayside once again joined forces with Mill Mountain Theatre, staging Forever Plaid in Middletown, before the show moved to Roanoke. The majority of productions that season received praise, a notable exception being Sherlock’s Veiled Secret. Before the 1996 season began, Wayside hosted four performances of Always Patsy Cline by the Arkansas Repertory Theatre, which took place at John Handley High School, since Wayside's stage was too small for the event. It was the first and only time Wayside acted as hosts of another company's show.

During an interview before the 1996 season began, Owens was asked about how Wayside selects its actors each season. He noted around 90% of Wayside's actors were based in New York City and he would see "1,000 actors for the 60 or so slots available each summer." Many of the actors he wanted were also sought after by theatres in New York City, but two things that benefitted his search were the positive reputation Wayside had and that some actors wanted a chance to work outside of the city one summer.

The 1997 season was expanded to nine plays, with the first two being children's theatre productions, one of which was made possible by a grant from the VCA. A bluegrass concert benefiting the theatre's purchase of a new lighting system took place that year, with performances by the Lynn Morris Band and other musical acts. Another benefit that year which coincided with the 200th anniversary of the Wayside Inn was a black-tie event with special guest James Earl Jones, which raised $16,000. According to one news article, Jones "captivated the audience which gave him a standing ovation after he finished."

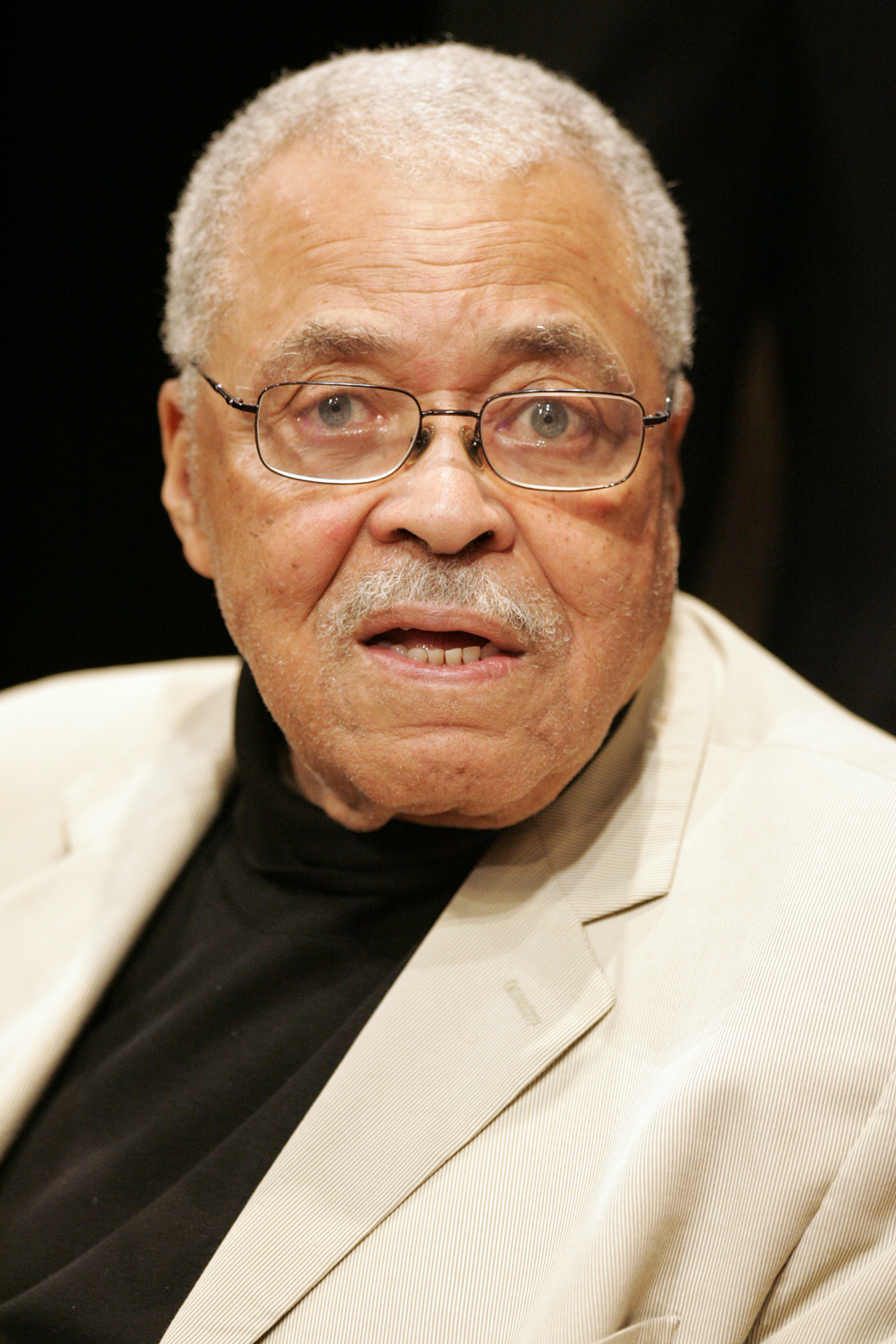
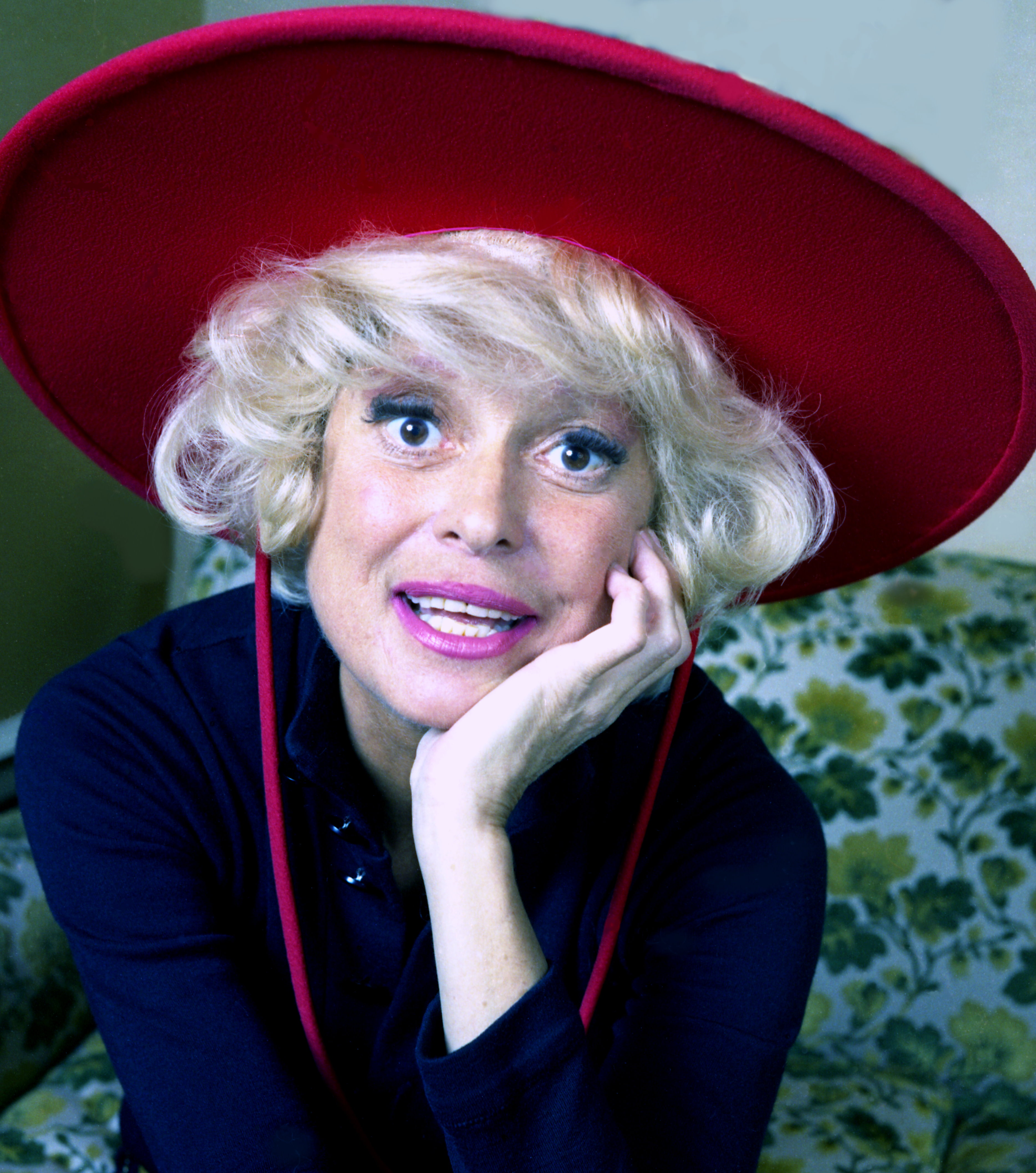
James Earl Jones and Carol Channing were the guests of honor at Wayside fundraisers in the 1990s.

Among the performances in 1997 was Pump Boys and Dinettes, which included the rear end of a Dodge car. Because there was no door in the rear of the theatre where the rear end could fit, it was brought in through the entrance and carried over the seats. During this time period, there were hopes of the theatre company moving to a new cultural center that Lord Fairfax Community College was raising funds to build. Owens noted that although Wayside only paid $1 in rent each year to Bernstein, the theatre would have stability in a new space, one that wouldn't require constant maintenance.

Owens' last season as artistic director was 1998, which featured the same number of plays as the previous season, including the two children's productions. Another black-tie fundraiser was held that year featuring Carol Channing as the guest of honor. The event was held behind the Wayside Inn and Channing entered by walking under raised swords held by students from Randolph-Macon Academy. Before the event Channing said "I'm thrilled to be able to do this benefit for Wayside Theatre. Live theatre is so important to our country and has been my whole life. I think we'll have a great time that night and help keep professional theatre growing in Virginia."

During his first year as artistic director, Warner Crocker hired actors not only from New York City, Washington, D.C., and the local area, but also from Chicago, where he had previously worked. He initially retained the theatre's staff that had worked there for many years, but soon replaced them with new hires. The first play in the 1999 season, Measure for Measure, was the first time a Shakespeare play was performed at Wayside. Some of the plays during that season receive mixed reviews, but Stonewall Jackson's House received acclaim and, according to Laster, was "one of the most meaningful, yet controversial, works ever performed during all of Wayside's history."

In addition to Jackson, actors who appeared at Wayside in the 1990s include Sam Gold, who would later become a Tony Award-winning director, Clark Middleton, David Engel, Ron Palillo, and Bart Shatto. Plays performed at Wayside that decade include A Walk in the Woods, The Lion in Winter, I Hate Hamlet, Equus, Marvin's Room, The Mousetrap, and La Bête.

==== 2000s ====
In early 2000 a fire destroyed one of the houses near the theatre where some visiting actors stayed. Around that same time Wayside began to host stage readings by theatre staff and locals that took place on weekends from January to April, a new venture that was repeated the following two years. The regular season was well received, with much praise for the staging of Talley's Folly and Steel Magnolias. In September 2000 another fundraising event was held for the theatre, with special guests The Drifters. The following year Crocker gave an interview where he noted the financial changes that took place since he took over as artistic director: the theatre retiring its $85,000 debt, reducing the annual budget from $500,000 to $400,000 which included hiring non-union actors in addition to Equity actors, extending the theatre's season, and hosting acting classes for children on Mondays, the traditional "dark day" for theatre. He also noted the theatre's mission had changed from being "strictly professional" to a "community-based professional theatre." In 2001 Bernstein donated $60,000 for renovation costs of the theatre's electrical, heating, and air conditioning systems. The season's plays were well received, including Yes, Virginia, There is a Santa Claus, which replaced the annual staging of A Christmas Carol.

Wayside's schedule was dramatically changed beginning in 2002. Crocker told a reporter "Because of the increase in subscription sales...the theatre is expanding its 2002 season with two more shows and monthly theatre activities...There will be entertainment at Wayside Theatre for 44 of this year's 52 weeks." The expanded season included performances in the Curtain Call Cafe and children's theatre. Among the performances that season was a benefit for Beth El Congregation in Winchester. That year Wayside received a $41,000 grant from the VCA to cover expenses and educational outreach. Despite the grant, after state funding was cut, the number of staff and interns was reduced from 20 to 12.

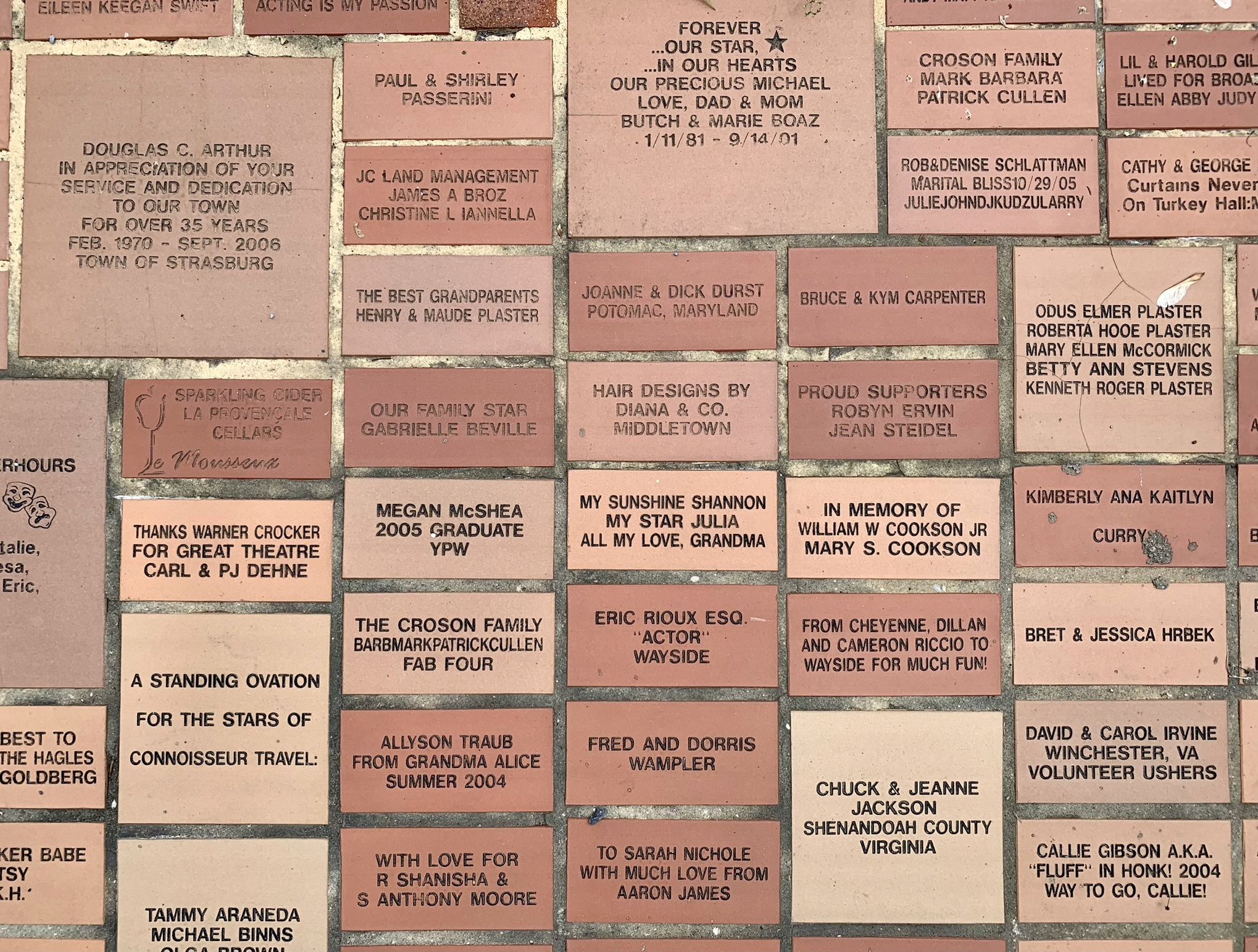
The Sidewalk of Fame are engraved bricks outside the theatre that was started as a fundraising campaign in 2003.

Starting in 2003, Wayside's seasons began running into the following year, due to the change of year-round activities. The 2003/2004 season began with the theatre having around 1,000 season subscriptions. The Wayside Foundation of American History and Arts donated the building's deed to the theatre company along with a gift of $100,000. The 2003 staging of The Complete Works of William Shakespeare (Abridged) and Cotton Patch Gospel were among the plays that were praised by critics. The following year Wayside hosted its first production performed at the theatre about Patsy Cline, a native of Winchester, titled A Closer Walk with Patsy Cline.

In 2003 there was a proposal to expand the theatre by adding 7,000 sq ft (650 sq m) of additional space, including a 90-seat black box theater and more dressing rooms. The new space would be located behind the current theatre, fronting Second Street. After initial plans were announced, the fourth-grade class from Middletown Elementary School raised $521 for the project. The class was honored in the Sidewalk of Fame, engraved bricks outside the theatre that was started as a fundraising campaign in 2003. Plans for the expansion were submitted in front of the Middletown Planning Commission in 2004. Crocker told the commission the benefit of Wayside having two performance spaces would be the ability to stage more productions, including children's theatre and experimental plays.

The 2004/2005 season was changed to premiere in June 2004 to align with the scheduling of other regional theatres. During that year's opening night, the theatre was renamed The Leo M. Bernstein Wayside Theatre, but the name was soon changed back. Among the plays staged in 2004 was Robert E. Lee and John Brown, Lighting the Fuse, written by Crocker, that included lectures beforehand, including ones by historians Merrill D. Peterson and Mark Snell. During the 2005/2006 season, most of the plays were well received, except Sister Amnesia's Country Western Nunsense Jamboree, a sequel to Nunsense, that was panned by critics.

Plans for the theatre's expansion continued into 2006, with management announcing they had received donations and funding commitments of around $600,000 since 2004. That was less than half of what the expected costs would be. Revenue from tickets sales had climbed to $425,000 each year, but that only covered around 60% of expenses. The remainder was funded by grants, donations, and fundraising activities. On November 26, 2006, a groundbreaking ceremony took place behind the theatre. At that point around $700,000 had been raised for the project. The scene shop and another outbuilding were demolished to clear the land. Construction was slated to begin the following year, but due to stalled funding, an increase in the theatre's debt, and the 2008 financial crisis, the expansion never took place.

To prepare its patrons for an upcoming renovation that would require the theatre to temporarily close, Wayside hosted two Christmas shows in 2006, A Christmas Story in Middletown and Sanders Family Christmas at the Old Town Events Center in Winchester. The 2007/2008 season didn't take place in Middletown due to the $650,000 renovation happening at the theatre. Changes to the theatre included enlarging the stage by expanding the back portion of the building, renovating the bathrooms, new lighting, new plumbing, new seats, and new roof support beams. While the renovation was taking place, Wayside's performances were held at the Royal Phoenix, a former office building for Avtex Fibers in Front Royal, and the Glaize Studio Theatre at Shenandoah University. Despite these temporary changes, the plays during this time were well received, but ticket sales dropped by around 45% due to the relocations. It was hoped the Royal Phoenix space could become a permanent second location for the theatre, but like the expansion project, this never occurred due to finances.

Performances returned to Wayside for the 2008/2009 season. The Great Recession began taking its toll on the theatre with lower ticket sales. One way management reduced expenses was by replacing the staging of Lies and Legends, the Songs and Stories of Harry Chapin, which would have involved paying a large sum in royalties, with Southern Crossroads, created by Crocker and Steve Przybylski. Among the plays to receive praise that season were The Gin Game and Buddy: The Buddy Holly Story.

Actors who appeared at Wayside in the 2000s include Lonnie Burr, one of the original Mousketeers. Plays performed at Wayside during the 2000s include All I Really Need to Know I Learned in Kindergarten, Laughter on the 23rd Floor, The Spitfire Grill (musical), Othello, and Man of La Mancha.

==== 2010s ====
Due to the lingering effects of the Great Recession, ticket sales for the 2010/2011 season continued to decline and Wayside's financial struggles worsened. In 2010 theatre officials held public meetings to inform locals of the financial issues and a fundraising event at Lord Fairfax Community College took place. There was also uncertainty about the theatre's future after Bernstein's death when his family began selling his properties in Strasburg and Middletown, including the Wayside Inn. Although the theatre was no longer owned by Bernstein, its connection to the inn worried locals. Despite the financial constraints, the theatre was still able to stage a number of well-received plays, including Groucho and Dead Man's Cell Phone.

By the start of the 2011/2012 season, Wayside's debt stood at $900,000. Management was only able to raise $106,225 during an emergency fundraising campaign. Money-saving measures followed including firing two staff members and, similar to Wayside's 1980s financial crisis, the theatre ended its affiliation with the Actors' Equity Association. The theatre celebrated its 50th anniversary (based on the premise it opened in 1961) before the 2011-2012 began, despite questions in the press about whether or not Wayside would continue to operate. Before the season opener, it was announced that following a $100,000 donation by James R. Wilkins, the theatre's auditorium had been renamed in his honor. The success of Wayside's annual Christmas play and a well-attended staging of Greater Tuna in 2012 did help alleviate some financial stress, but the theatre's debt remained high.

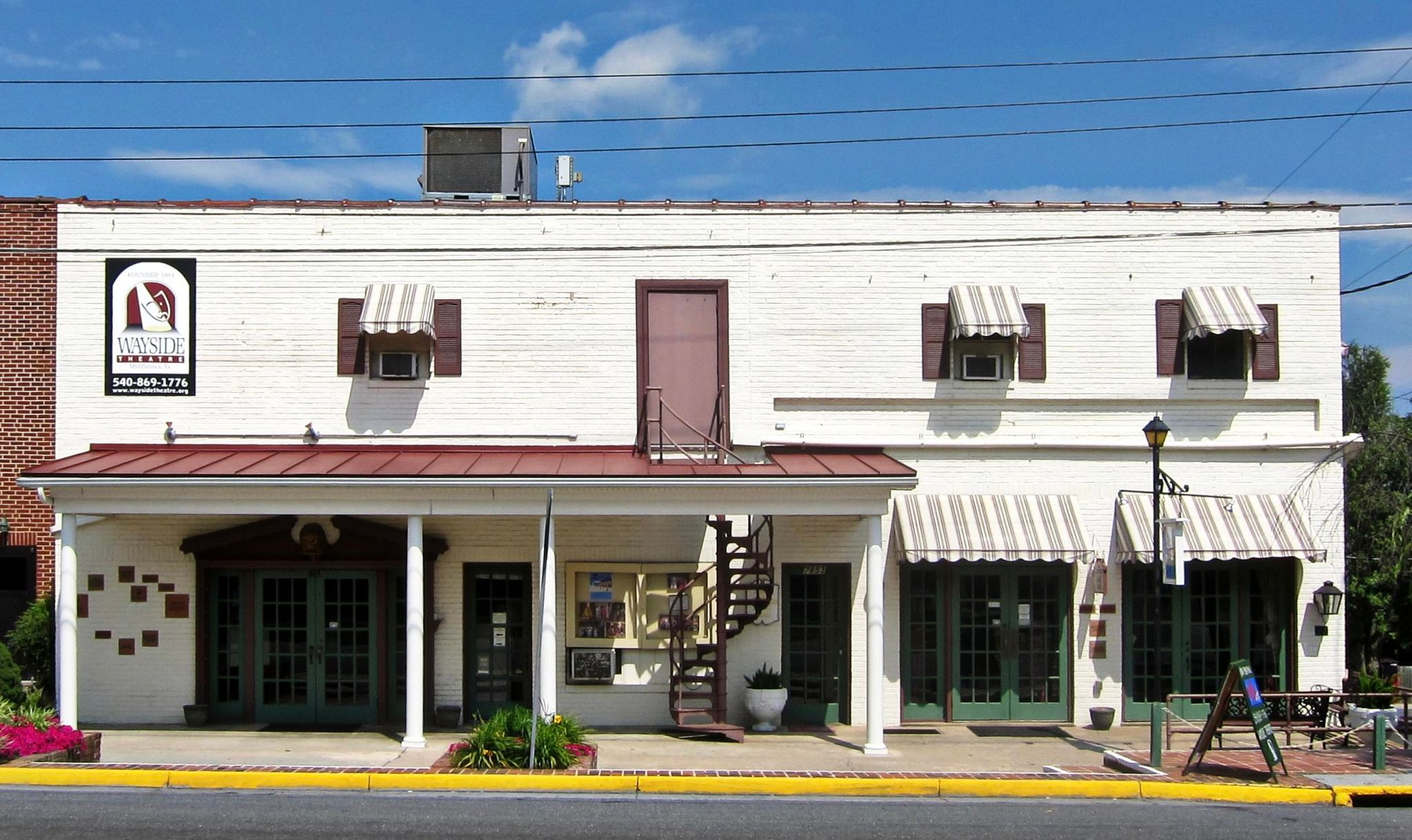
The theatre a few weeks before it closed in 2013, during the staging of its last production, Boeing-Boeing.

During the first half of the 2012/2013 season, ticket sales were substantially less than expected. This included the annual Christmas play, traditionally a financial boon for the theatre. In January 2013 Crocker announced the theatre may close if it didn't raise $90,000 within the next 90 days. Another warning sign was that subscriptions for the 2013/2014 were not being sold. Despite the announcement of Wayside's potential closure, one reporter noted after seeing Smoke on the Mountain: Homecoming: "no one could tell a dark cloud looms over the theater on Main Street of Middletown with the excellent acting and musical performance of the cast."

A few weeks after Crocker's plea, he said the theatre had received over $30,000 in donations. By March he announced Wayside had raised almost $86,000 and, not only would the theatre remain open, plans were being made for the 2013/2014 season and fundraising events would take place that June and December.

The 2013/2014 season started with Church Basement Ladies in June 2013 followed by Boeing-Boeing in July. During the rehearsals of Boeing-Boeing, members of Wayside's board informed Crocker his employment was terminated. He was allowed to continue rehearsals for the play, and on opening night, Crocker informed everyone it would be the last play he'd direct at Wayside. Boeing-Boeing was intended to run until August 11, but during rehearsals of the next planned production, I Love You, You're Perfect, Now Change, board members announced Wayside was $1 million in debt and would close effective immediately. Local business owners began to worry about the rippling effect it could cause. At that time of its closing, Wayside was the second oldest professional theatre company in Virginia, with the Barter Theatre being the oldest.

After the theatre closed, the Wayside Foundation for the Arts donated memorabilia to the Handley Library. The interior of the theatre was gutted and the men's bathroom was renovated into kitchen space for a short-lived brewery. The building was put for auction in 2015, but there were no bidders. A website chronicling the theatre's history was created by Laster, which The Northern Virginia Daily called "the answer to a years-long effort to unearth the history of Wayside Theatre and prevent the disappearance of its stories from the collective consciousness." Wayside Inn's business declined after the theatre closed and it went through a series of sales during the following decade.

== Design ==
The brick building measures 11,853 sq ft (1,110 sq m) and is two-stories tall, not including the basement level. It features six bays, a flat metal roof, and a rear shed. A portion of the façade includes a one-story porch supported by four Tuscan columns. A metal spiral staircase leading to a door on the second floor interrupts the porch. The main entrance is a set of French doors, composed of fifteen windows, flanked by sidelights. Above the main entrance are decorative wood panels. There are two other doors on the façade in addition to the set of French doors leading to the former cafe. Above this set of doors are wood panels. The side of the building has four entrances. Due to the age of the building and its architectural integrity, the former theatre is a contributing property to the Middletown Historic District, which was listed on the National Register of Historic Places and Virginia Landmarks Register in 2003.
