= Observer (Dunkirk, New York) =

- Type: Daily newspaper
- Format: Broadsheet
- Owner: Ogden Newspapers Inc.
- Publisher: John D'Agostino
- Editor: Gregory Bacon
- Founded: 1882
- Language: English
- Headquarters: 10 E. Second Street; Dunkirk, NY 14048; United States
- Circulation: 7,383 Daily (as of 2017)
- Website: observertoday.com

The Observer is a newspaper for the residents of northern Chautauqua County, New York and northwestern Cattaraugus County, New York, with offices located in Dunkirk. It was formerly known as the Evening Observer, and before then, the Dunkirk Evening Observer. Originally delivered in the afternoon six days a week (Monday through Saturday), the Observer later changed to morning delivery seven days a week, before changing back to delivery six days a week with a combined Saturday/Sunday weekend edition on August 31, 2019.

== History ==
The Observer was first published December 4, 1882 by founder Dr. Julien T. Williams. John D'Agostino, former news and managing editor, is the current publisher.

The newspaper describes itself as a hometown paper, but it is owned by Ogden Newspapers Inc. of Wheeling, West Virginia; the paper is operated in a cluster along with The Post-Journal of Jamestown, New York and the Times-Observer of Warren, Pennsylvania.

From March 13, 2014, to October 31, 2016, the entirety of the newspaper's website was placed behind a paywall. The site had been behind a paywall for most of the early 2000s but that paywall was also eventually removed.
