= Times Leader (disambiguation) =

Times Leader is a privately owned newspaper in Wilkes-Barre, Pennsylvania.

Times Leader may also refer to:

- The Times Leader (Kentucky), a newspaper in Caldwell County, Kentucky
- Martins Ferry Times Leader, a newspaper in Belmont County, Ohio
- Daily Times Leader, a newspaper in West Point, Mississippi
- Times leader, a leading article in The Times of London
- Times Leader, a newspaper in Wilkes-Barre, Pennsylvania

== See also ==
- Leader Times
