= Westfield Republican =

American newspaper

- Type: Weekly Newspaper
- Publisher: Ogden Newspapers
- Editor: Jeff Keller
- Founded: April 25, 1855
- Language: American English
- Headquarters: 39 E Main St. Westfield, New York
- City: Westfield
- Country: United States
- Circulation: 482
- ISSN: 1071-1074
- OCLC number: 10035175
- Website: westfieldrepublican.com

The Westfield Republican is an American, English language newspaper providing news and information on the town and village of Westfield, as well as northern Chautauqua County in the state of New York. It began with the April 25, 1855 issue. The paper is currently published weekly. The paper claims to be the "First Republican paper printed in the USA."

== History ==
The paper was founded by Martin C. Rice in 1855, shortly after the formation of the Republican Party in New York, and about a year after the Republican Party's beginnings in Wisconsin. Rice, who was born in 1827 in St. Lawrence County, had moved to Chautauqua with his family in 1832.

The first issue went out on April 25, 1855.

In 1861, the paper famously covered the meeting of Abraham Lincoln and Westfield resident Grace Bedell. Bedell, a young girl, had written Lincoln and suggested growing a beard would improve his appearance. Lincoln returned a letter seeming to gently dismiss the idea, but on a train tour through New York he stopped at Westfield and during a speech asked if Bedell was in the crowd, stating that it had been her suggestion that had prompted the growing of his beard during that campaign. The February 20, 1861 edition of the paper recounts the story in a small item on the final page:

"He stated that soon after his nomination he received a letter from a little girl in this place, making some comments on his personal appearance, and suggesting that his looks would be improved by whiskers, and that having no little girl to answer the letter, he answered it himself, and as the crowd could see, had acted upon her suggestion; and desired if the little girl was in the crowd, that she would come forward. The little Miss alluded to is a daughter of Mr. Bedell, a resident of this place, and is some twelve years of age. She was soon brought forward, and Lincoln stepped from the car, shook hands with her, kissed her, and asked how she liked the improvements she advised him to make. Every one was feeling so well at this time, and there were so many good-natured remarks that our reporter's pencil did not catch the reply."

Rice continued to run it until 1873, after which it passed to F. A. Hall, and later Alfred E. Rose. From 1889 through 1939, H. W. Thompson was publisher, and it remained in the Thompson family until 1963, at which point it was sold to Ogden Newspapers. In 2014, it absorbed the Mayville Sentinel News.

Both the Post-Journal and the Westfield Republican were recipients of the County Executive's Award for Innovative Energy Initiatives.
