= Sentinel (Fairmont) =

American newspaper

Coordinates: 43.652589°N 94.462799°W

- Type: Daily newspaper
- Owner: Ogden Newspapers
- Publisher: Brooke Wohlrabe
- Editor: Brooke Wohlrabe
- Founded: 1874
- Headquarters: 64 Downtown Plaza; Fairmont, Minnesota 56031
- City: Fairmont
- Country: United States
- Circulation: 2,527 (as of 2024)
- OCLC number: 20669095
- Website: fairmontsentinel.com

The Sentinel is an American, English language daily newspaper headquartered in Fairmont, Martin County, Minnesota. It was founded in 1874 and is owned by Ogden Newspapers as of 2020.

== History ==
The Sentinel is descended from the following newspapers:

- The Daily Sentinel (1958–1966), publisher: Walter Mickelson Jr. OCLC 20669108
- Fairmont Daily Sentinel (1901–1958), publisher: Day & Aldrich OCLC 1568756
- Martin County Independent (1896–1929), publisher: Martin County Independent Co OCLC 1586163
- The Fairmont News (1885–1905), publisher: H.M. Blaisdell OCLC 1568755
- The Martin County Democrat (1892–1896), publisher: St. John & Bilderbac OCLC 1714641
