= The Page News and Courier =

- Type: Weekly newspaper
- Owner: Ogden Newspapers
- Founded: 22 May 1911
- Headquarters: PO Box 707, 1113 East Main Street Luray, Virginia 22835
- Circulation: 4,128 (as of 2021)
- OCLC number: 14979218
- Website: www.dnronline.com/page_news_and_courier/

The Page News and Courier is Page County, Virginia’s largest general circulation newspaper and provides coverage of local and regional news, events, issues, people, and industries.

== History ==
The newspaper was founded in Luray, Virginia in 1911 by a merger between The Page News (established in 1881) and The Page Valley Courier (established March 1867).

An earlier newspaper, the Luray Review, may have been the predecessor of Page Valley Courier, having been established before the American Civil War. Due to financial woes experienced on account of the war, however, the Luray Review may have ceased production as early as 1862.

On March 6, 2018, it was announced that The Page News and Courier, along with the other Byrd family newspapers, was sold to Ogden Newspapers.

== Notes ==
- With a circulation of 2,500, the weekly newspaper is viewed by a limited number of households of the county.
- The paper is released on Thursdays to newsstands and sold on the corner of Main and Broad in Luray. Those who subscribe to the paper via the United States Postal Service receive their copy on Thursday in the mail, hence the paper is printed and dated for Thursday distribution.
- The price of the paper was raised to $1.00 in 2024.
