= Flyer News =

University of Dayton student newspaper

- The January 9, 2009 front page of Flyer News
- Type: Student newspaper
- Format: Tabloid
- Owner(s): University of Dayton student newspaper
- Editor-in-chief: Zoë Hill and Bridgett Dillenburger
- Founded: 1959
- Headquarters: Kennedy Union; Suite 232; Dayton, OH; 45469-0626; United States
- Circulation: 4,000 Monday
- Website: www.flyernews.com

Flyer News, also known as "fn", is the independent student newspaper of the University of Dayton in Dayton, Ohio. It was first published October 21, 1959 and is now published in print monthly while classes are in session, for a total of nine issues per academic year. Currently, 4,000 copies of each issue are distributed throughout campus. Each issue is typically 12 pages long and includes four sections: news, arts and entertainment, opinions and sports. Flyer News' website is updating weekly with campus, local and national news; editorials, Flyer sports recaps and breaking news.

== History ==
The history of the student press at the University of Dayton starts with The Exponent, which began publication in 1902. The Exponent was more literary magazine than newspaper. It was published annually at first, then monthly. Over time, The Exponent expanded its mission to include news, particularly during World War I, but it reverted to a literary magazine with the introduction of The University of Dayton News in 1933. This paper was published every two weeks. The Exponent lasted into the early 1960s as a literary magazine.

The University of Dayton News newspaper became a four-page broadsheet in 1935. It was discontinued in 1944, partly to save paper during World War II, and was restored in 1946, still a broadsheet published once every two weeks. The paper continued on that basis until February 1955. At that time, the newspaper changed printers to a non-union shop to allow students to help with production and to save money. The new printer could not handle broadsheet pages, and The University of Dayton News would not fit across the top of a tabloid page, so the name of the paper was changed to the Dayton Flyer. For the October 21, 1959 issue, the name was changed to Flyer News. The page count and publication schedule were occasionally irregular. By the end of the decade, however, advertising had stabilized and Flyer News began publishing twice a week, a schedule that continued until 2013. At the start of the 2013-2014 academic year, the paper became weekly and expanded to 16 pages per issue. Although the paper was only published once a week, the website is consistently updated with relevant breaking news stories. Flyer News was then published biweekly until the COVID-19 pandemic. All "print" issues were published as digital PDF issues monthly when students returned to campus in August 2020. Print newspapers returned in 2021, continuing the monthly print schedule.

In October 2022, Flyer News launched a podcast called The Aerial View which includes reoccurring segments and interviews that follow current events and campus news. The podcast partners with the university's largest organization, Red Scare, to produce Redscare Radio, a Flyers sports recap and talk show. Porch Profile, previously a regular segment in Flyer News, shifted to The Aerial View format; Roommate groups are interviewed by a host and discuss their on-campus residences.

Though the newspaper was not called Flyer News until 1959, it generally includes the Dayton Flyer as part of its lineage, as it too was a student-produced tabloid at the University of Dayton. This places the first year of the newspaper in 1955. In addition, both volume 31 and volume 32 were produced during the 1984-1985 academic year; it is unknown why this was done.

== Structure ==
Because the University of Dayton is a private university, it is theoretically in control of all content produced on university property. However, due to a long-standing agreement with the university, Flyer News has remained independent. The current advisor for the paper, Professor J. Frazier Smith, has been in his position since 2012. Unlike many other private college newspapers, the advisor exists only to provide feedback and advice to the current staff. The holder of the post does not act to censor, edit or otherwise control the content of the newspaper.

Flyer News is a branch of Flyer Media, which includes FlyerTV and Flyer Radio.

The newspaper employs numerous students who fill positions in the news, arts and entertainment, opinions, sports, graphic design, advertising, photography, circulation, podcasting and web departments of the newspaper. At the end of each academic year, a panel of senior staff members selects a Print Editor-in-Chief and Online Editor-in-Chief for the following year. These Editors-in-Chief then selects his or her own staff for the following year.

Previously, unlike many student publications, employees were not paid through an hourly wage or a salary but rather through a scholarship. The amount of the scholarship was based on the position held. The cost of these scholarships, along with all other expenses, were paid by Flyer News through the advertising that is included in the newspaper. Currently, staff is paid based on an hourly wage schedule as of 2020.

== Honors ==
In 1989, Flyer News received its first All-American award from the Associated Collegiate Press. The award is based on above average performance in four of five categories, which are coverage and content, writing and editing, layout and design, leadership, and photography, art and graphics. The newspaper continued to receive this award each year for the following nine years until it was inducted into the ACP Hall of Fame in 2000. Flyer News was the 34th newspaper to be named to this group. There are currently 57 members of the ACP Hall of Fame.

The publication has also received a number of other awards. It received the Top Organization Award from the University of Dayton in both the 1996-1997 and 2000-2001 academic years. It also received a Certificate of Appreciation from the University of Dayton Department of Military Science Army ROTC in 2001 an Award of Merit from the Ohio College Newspaper Association.

== Archives ==
The newspaper has a near complete archive of its publications. Archives begin with volume 3 (1956–1957). Partially complete archives exist through volume 21 (1974–1975), with many, but not all, issues of the paper existing in the form of bound volumes. Starting with volume 22 (1975–1976), there is a complete physical archive of all issues of the newspaper.

In addition to this paper archive, construction has begun of a digital archive of all issues produced dating back to 1956. Complete soft copy records have been compiled for all issues produced after September 1, 1998, with the notable exception of issues appearing between January 13, 2004, and April 20, 2004, due to the loss of an archival disc. Digital scans of the print archives can be found at the following location: https://flyernews.com/print-archives/

== See also ==
- List of college and university student newspapers in the United States
- List of newspapers in Ohio
