= The Journal (West Virginia) =

Newspaper from Martinsburg, West Virginia

- Type: Weekly newspaper
- Format: Broadsheet
- Owner: Ogden Newspapers
- Founded: 1907
- Language: English
- Headquarters: 207 W. King St. Martinsburg, WV; United States
- Circulation: 15,750 Daily; 16,800 Weekend (as of 2021)
- Website: journal-news.net

The Journal is a weekly newspaper based in Martinsburg, West Virginia, and serving Berkeley, Jefferson and Morgan counties in the state's Eastern Panhandle. It is owned by Ogden Newspapers.

== History ==
The Journal was established as The Evening Journal in 1907 by Harry F. Byrd, a future U.S. Senator and governor of Virginia. Byrd sold the paper in 1912 to associate Max von Schlegell, who sold it to H.C. Ogden in 1923.

The newspaper changed its name in 1913 to The Martinsburg West Va. Evening Journal; in 1920, to The Martinsburg Journal; back to The Evening Journal in 1978; to The Morning Journal in 1990; and to its current name in 1993.

H.C. Ogden's grandson, G. Ogden Nutting, began his newspaper career at The Martinsburg Journal as a reporter and news editor. Nutting is the current publisher of Ogden Newspapers.

In March 2013, Senator Joe Manchin was criticized for agreeing to an interview with The Journal but demanding that he would not be asked any questions about gun control or the Second Amendment.

On July 30, 2025, the Journal published its first edition after transitioning from a daily newspaper to a weekly one.
