= Norwalk Reflector =

Newspaper in Norwalk, Ohio, USA

- Type: Daily newspaper
- Owner: Ogden Newspapers
- Publisher: Jeremy Speer
- Editor: Brandon Addeo
- Founded: 1830
- Relaunched: Grand Haven (Mich.) Tribune, Johnson City (Tenn.) Press, Kingsport (Tenn.) Times-News, Lebanon (Tenn.) Democrat and Sandusky Register
- Headquarters: 61 East Monroe Street; Norwalk, Ohio 44857
- City: Norwalk, Ohio
- Country: United States
- Circulation: 5600 (as of 2018) (as of 2008)
- ISSN: 0745-4023
- Website: norwalkreflector.com

The Norwalk Reflector is a newspaper in Norwalk, Ohio, published Monday through Saturday, except U.S. federal holidays, in Norwalk, Ohio, United States with a daily distribution of approximately 5,600.

The newspaper serves Norwalk and the rest Huron County, plus the Milan and Berlin Heights communities in southern Erie County. It is part of the Sandusky Newspaper Group — a seven-paper organization based in Sandusky, Ohio.

The SNG papers are the Grand Haven (Mich.) Tribune, Johnson City (Tenn.) Press, Kingsport (Tenn.) Times-News, Lebanon (Tenn.) Democrat, Norwalk Reflector and the Sandusky Register.

The group recently announced the sale of the Standard-Examiner to the Provo Daily Herald.

== History ==
The Huron Reflector issued its first edition on Feb. 2, 1830. Newspapers.com has available the paper's run through 1863.

Owners of the new project were Samuel Preston and George Buckingham. The latter gentleman had been a co-owner of Norwalk's very first newspaper, the Reporter. The Reporter ceased to exist in 1830. The Firelands Historical Society preserves an original file, which has also been microfilmed and is available at the public library.

The first Reflector office was in the second story of a mercantile building at 9 W. Main St. Samuel Preston's daughter, Lucy, married Frederick Wickham in January 1835. Samuel soon bought the lot at 38 W. Main St. (next to the present public library), and in the summer of 1835 began building a building there. This building was completed and occupied in 1836, and since being moved in 1954, houses the museum of the Firelands Historical Society.

It was planned that the Prestons and Wickhams would occupy the first floor and basement, with the newspaper office on the second floor. There are marks in the flooring said to have been made by the Stanbury press used in the earliest time. A year or so into the venture, the editor announced that the paper being used was “homemade” in Norwalk by the Norwalk Manufacturing Company.

Before the first Reflector was ever issued, Preston and Buckingham pondered over an appropriate name. It is a family story that Samuel Preston was in the taproom of Obadiah Jenney's Mansion House hotel (where the Chamber of Commerce is now) and noticed a reflector lamp or candle holder on the wall. It suddenly occurred to him that “Reflector” would be a good name, on the premise that the paper would “reflect” the news.

The newspaper office moved out of the house when both the paper and the growing Wickham family needed more room. Lucy Preston's husband, Frederick Wickham, took over editorship of the paper, and it stayed in the family until a century ago. In 1913 it was purchased by R. C. Snyder, who already owned the Norwalk Evening Herald. The papers were combined into the Norwalk Reflector-Herald, and every so often you hear an old-timer refer to the paper as the Reflector-Herald ... but not too often any more.

Mr. Snyder was president of the Associated Ohio Dailies and the vice-president of the World Press Congress prior to his death in 1941. The publication was subsequently purchased by Dudley A. White, Mrs. Dudley A. White, Mrs. Alice White Rau and Dudley White, Jr.

Inasmuch as he is a son-in-law of the late R.G. Snyder, and James G. Gibbs was the son-in-law of Frederick Wickham, who in turn, was the son-in-law of the founder, Samuel Preston, it can be said that two families have owned the Reflector throughout the 188-plus years it has been a “part and parcel” of Norwalk's history.

== Modern newspaper ==
The newspaper now is located at 34 East Main St. Jeremy Speer is the publisher, and Brian Gott is the managing editor. Mark Hazelwood is sports editor, and Angela LaRosa is the lead reporter.
