= Marshall Independent =

Coordinates: 44.450491°N 95.792646°W

- Type: Daily newspaper
- Owner: Ogden Newspapers
- Publisher: Grant Gibbons
- Editor: Mike Lamb
- Founded: 1873
- Headquarters: 508 West Main Street; Marshall, MN 56258-0411
- City: Marshall
- Country: United States
- Circulation: 3,540 (as of 2024)
- Readership: Lyon County
- OCLC number: 22756175
- Website: marshallindependent.com

The Marshall Independent is an American, English-language newspaper headquartered in Marshall, Lyon County, Minnesota. It is published Monday through Saturday, and is owned by Ogden Newspapers. It has been called the Independent since 1974. The newspaper was originally founded in 1875 and called The Prairie Schooner. The newspaper includes a supplement called the Southwestern Peach.

== History ==
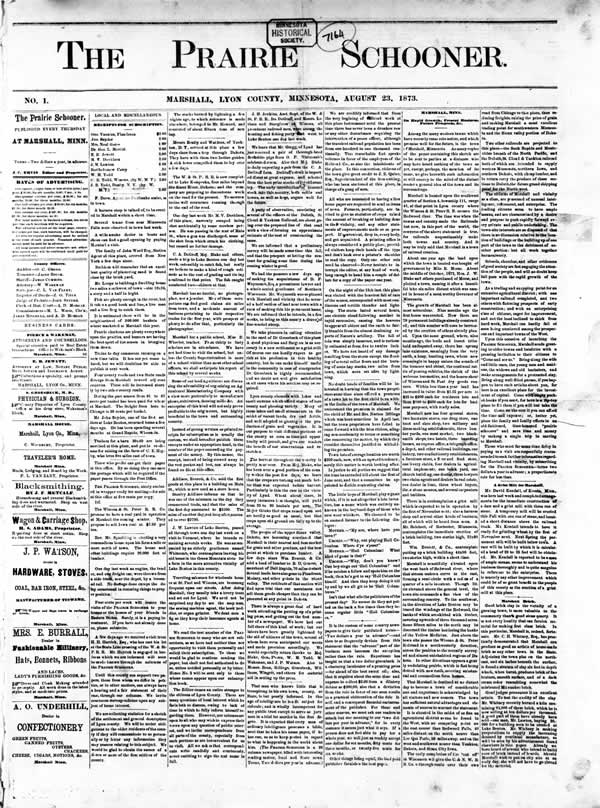
The Prairie Schooner, Marshall, Minnesota, August 23, 1873

The Marshall Independent traces its history back to shortly after the formation of Lyon County in 1878. It has had the following names:

- Messenger Independent (1973-1974)
- Lyon County independent (1932-1973)
- Messenger (1973-1973)
- Marshall Messenger (1961-1973)
- The Marshall Daily Messenger (1955-1961)
- The Marshall Messenger (1942-1955)
- Marshall Daily Messenger (1932-1942)
- The News Messenger of Lyon County (1885-1932)
- The Farmers Reporter (1918-1921)
- Lyon County Mews (1879-1885)
- Marshall Messenger (1875-1885)
- The Prairie Schooner (1873-1875)

The Marshall Independent has a website and Facebook presence for distribution of news and interacting with readers.

The newspaper covers local, Minnesota, national, and international news. Other sections of the newspaper include business news, crime reports, agriculture and extension news, public notices, and featured articles.

In 2019, the newspaper had a daily circulation of 4,321, which ranks 17th of the newspapers in Minnesota publishing at least five days a week.
