= Daily News-Record =

Daily American newspaper

- Type: Daily newspaper
- Owner: Ogden Newspapers
- Publisher: Shari Keyes
- Editor: Derek Armstrong
- Founded: Rockingham Register (1822); Spirit of the Valley (1878); Evening News (1899); Daily News-Record (1913)
- Headquarters: 231 S Liberty St; Harrisonburg, Virginia
- Circulation: 14,579 Daily; 15,682 Saturday (as of 2021)
- Website: dnronline.com

The Daily News-Record is a daily newspaper published in Harrisonburg, Virginia. It serves the Shenandoah Valley in Virginia and West Virginia.

== History ==
=== 19th century ===
The earliest predecessor Daily News-Record was the Rockingham Weekly Register that began publication on July 27, 1822. In 1833 the Rockingham Weekly Register became the Rockingham Register.

On May 8, 1899, The Evening News was first published. The Evening News is the oldest direct parent of the Daily News-Record. When The Evening News became a morning paper it changed its name to Harrisonburg Daily News.

=== 20th century ===
In 1905 the Harrisonburg Daily Times was founded as a continuation of the Spirit of the Valley of 1878. Yet another competitor, the Rockingham Daily Record, was founded in 1911. The Daily Times folded in 1912. The Harrisonburg Daily News merged with Rockingham Daily Record resulting in the Harrisonburg Daily News-Record, published from June 4, 1913. The Rockingham Register was published as a weekly supplement of the Harrisonburg Daily News-Record until 1914.

In 1923, the Rockingham Publishing Company, led by State Senator Harry Byrd Sr., acquired the Daily News-Record. Byrd became the publisher. Two years later, Byrd won the elections for Governor of Virginia yet continued to function as the Daily News-Record publisher. In 1939 Harry Byrd Jr. became the new publisher only to be replaced in 2001 by his own son, Thomas Byrd.

=== 21st century ===
In 2016 the newspaper was printed in 26,000 copies and digitally circulated another 800 copies. In 2018 Ogden Newspapers bought the Byrd Newspapers group. Craig Bartoldson became the first publisher not from the Byrd family after 95 years. In 2019, the print figure was down to 23,000. The combined daily readership (print plus online) was estimated at more than 70,000.
