= The Messenger (newspaper) =

Newspaper in Fort Dodge, Iowa

- The September 12, 2001, front page of The Messenger
- Type: Daily newspaper
- Format: Broadsheet
- Owner(s): Ogden Newspapers Inc.
- Publisher: Terry Christensen
- Editor: Bill Shea
- Founded: July 31, 1856 (as Fort Dodge Sentinel)
- Political alignment: Nonpartisan
- Headquarters: 713 Central Avenue; Fort Dodge, Iowa 50501-3813, United States
- Circulation: 6,418
- Website: messengernews.net

The Messenger is a newspaper that is printed and delivered to the Fort Dodge, Iowa, area. That area covers Buena Vista, Calhoun, Greene, Hamilton, Humboldt, Kossuth, Palo Alto, Pocahontas, Sac, Webster, and Wright counties. It was founded on July 31, 1856. The Messenger's slogan is: "Spend a few minutes with us ... 7 days a week!" In early May 2020, The Messenger began delivering the Sunday edition on Saturday, effectively merging Saturday and Sunday into a weekend edition. According to the press release for the 2020 Iowa Newspaper Association Convention & Trade Show, The Messenger is a 'Daily Class I, a newspaper published daily with a circulation of 9,999 and under'. The Messenger is one of three newspapers serving Webster County, Iowa.

== Brief history ==
Fort Dodge Messenger and Chronicle

The Messenger of Fort Dodge, Iowa, came into existence as the Fort Dodge Sentinel on July 31, 1856, as a weekly poetry and prose publication. Selling for $2 per year, The Sentinel had a circulation of 1,200 at the time. In 1860, the name changed to The Fort Dodge Republican and increased its size to eight pages. In 1864, the name was changed to Iowa North West to reflect the expanded coverage of the newspaper. In fact, the publication at the time was the only newspaper between Sioux City, Iowa, and Fort Dodge. In 1884, the newspaper went daily as the population and news in the Fort Dodge region increased. In 1917, the newspaper merged with The Chronicle, another Fort Dodge newspaper, and the name became The Fort Dodge Messenger and Chronicle. In later years, the "Chronicle" title was dropped and the newspaper was officially known as The Fort Dodge Messenger. In 1963, The Messenger was purchased by Ogden Newspapers of Wheeling, West Virginia, a newspaper group with more than 40 newspaper holdings. In 2006, The Messenger celebrated its 150th anniversary.

== Sections ==
The Messenger 150th Anniversary Logo

- Classifieds
- Comics
- Education
- Lotteries
- Obituaries
- Opinion
- Region
- Sports
- Weather
