= The Northern Virginia Daily =

Daily American newspaper

- Type: Daily newspaper
- Format: Broadsheet
- Owner: Ogden Newspapers
- Editor: Robyn Taylor
- Founded: 1932
- Headquarters: 152 North Holliday Street; Strasburg, Virginia 22657
- Country: United States
- Circulation: 6,080 Daily; 6,670 Saturday (as of 2021)
- OCLC number: 35305939
- Website: www.nvdaily.com

The Northern Virginia Daily is a daily newspaper based in Strasburg, Virginia, serving the northern Shenandoah Valley, including Shenandoah County, Frederick County, Clarke County, Warren County, and the City of Winchester. It is owned by Ogden Newspapers.
