= Sandusky Register =

Ohio daily newspaper

Coordinates: 41.455703°N 82.713585°W

- Type: Daily newspaper
- Owner: Ogden Newspapers
- Publisher: Jeremy Speer
- Editor: Brandon Addeo
- Founded: 1822
- Language: American English
- Headquarters: 314 West Market Street; Sandusky, OH 44870
- City: Sandusky, Ohio
- Country: United States
- Circulation: 11,000 (as of 2023)
- OCLC number: 10384663
- Website: sanduskyregister.com

The Sandusky Register is a daily newspaper serving Sandusky, Ohio, as well as nearby Port Clinton and the Lake Erie Islands (collectively known regionally as Vacationland).

== History ==
The Sandusky Register has been in production since 1822, originally known as the Sandusky Clarion. Published in a building at the corner of Columbus Avenue and East Water Street, the Clarion became a daily newspaper on April 24, 1848.vThe Clarion office burned down in January 1852, destroying almost all files. Rechristened the Daily Register, the paper continued to grow with its city, becoming a paper of Republican affiliation in 1856.

In 1859, the paper was renamed the Commercial Register. The name plate Sandusky Register first appeared in 1869. A charter member of the Western Associated Press, parent of the present Associated Press, the Register was one of the first newspapers able to supply, through radio dispatch, instant news. In 1929, the Sandusky Register purchased the Democratic-affiliated paper the Sandusky Star-Journal and moved to its present location at Jackson and Market Streets in Sandusky. Both the Register and the Star-Journal continued publication under the corporate name of Sandusky Newspapers Inc. In 1941, the company acquired the rival Sandusky News, and the name on all editions was changed to the Register Star-News. The paper resumed its original name Sandusky Register in 1958.

Its website went live in 1996.

The Sandusky Register was purchased in 1869, by Isaac Foster "I.F." Mack, an Oberlin College graduate and union soldier who was captured by the Confederacy and held as a Prisoner of War. Mack served in various roles during his 40 years at the Register, as editor, business manager and publisher, from 1869 to 1909. Mack's descendants owned the newspaper until July 2019 when Ogden Newspapers purchased the Sandusky Register.

The Sandusky Register has been named the best daily in Ohio in its circulation group by the Associated Press of Ohio eight times since 2007, in the general excellence category, placing second place in those other years. It has earned more awards than any newspaper of its size in Ohio, and in 2018 captured all three of the best investigative reporting awards from the AP. There are seven reporters, three editors, three page editors, a sports editor, two photographers, and a news/obits clerk.

== Awards and honors ==
- 2005: Digital Edge Award from the Newspaper Association of America for Best Online Advertising Program. Par 3 Golf Shootout.
- Eight-time Associated Press General Excellence Award winner - 2007, 2008, 2009, 2010, 2011, 2013, 2016, 2017.
- 2008: Best Web Site by the Associated Press in 2008 (Sanduskyregister.com).
- 2008: Associated Press Best Enterprise Fallen Sons series)
- 2012 Numerous individual Associated Press awards
