= Morning Journal =

- Type: Daily newspaper
- Format: Broadsheet
- Owner: Ogden Newspapers
- Founded: 1909; 117 years ago
- Headquarters: 308 Maple Street; Lisbon, Ohio 44432; United States
- Circulation: 6,000
- Website: morningjournalnews.com

The Morning Journal is an American daily newspaper based in Lisbon, Ohio. It is published by Ogden Newspapers and is circulated in Columbiana County, Ohio, and environs. The result of multiple mergers, it began printing in 1909.
