= The Winchester Star =

Newspaper published in Winchester, Virginia

- Type: Daily newspaper
- Owner: Ogden Newspapers
- Publisher: Mike Gochenour
- Managing editor: Cynthia Burton
- Opinion editor: OPEN
- Photo editor: Jeff Taylor
- Founded: July 4, 1896
- Language: English
- Headquarters: 100 N.Loudoun St, Ste 110, Winchester, Virginia United States
- Circulation: 11,829 Daily; 12,591 Saturday (as of 2021)
- Website: winchesterstar.com

The Winchester Star is a daily newspaper (Monday-Friday) based in Winchester, Virginia, covering the northern Shenandoah Valley area.

== History ==
On March 6, 2018, it was announced that The Winchester Star, along with the other Byrd family newspapers, were to be sold to Ogden Newspapers. Members of the Byrd family had been the sole owners of The Winchester Star since 1897.
