= The Courier (Findlay) =

Newspaper based in Findlay, Ohio, US

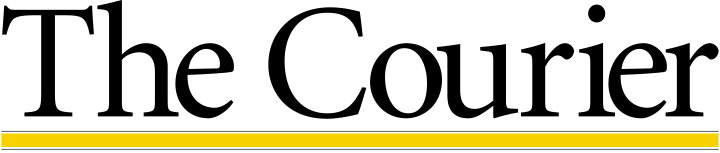

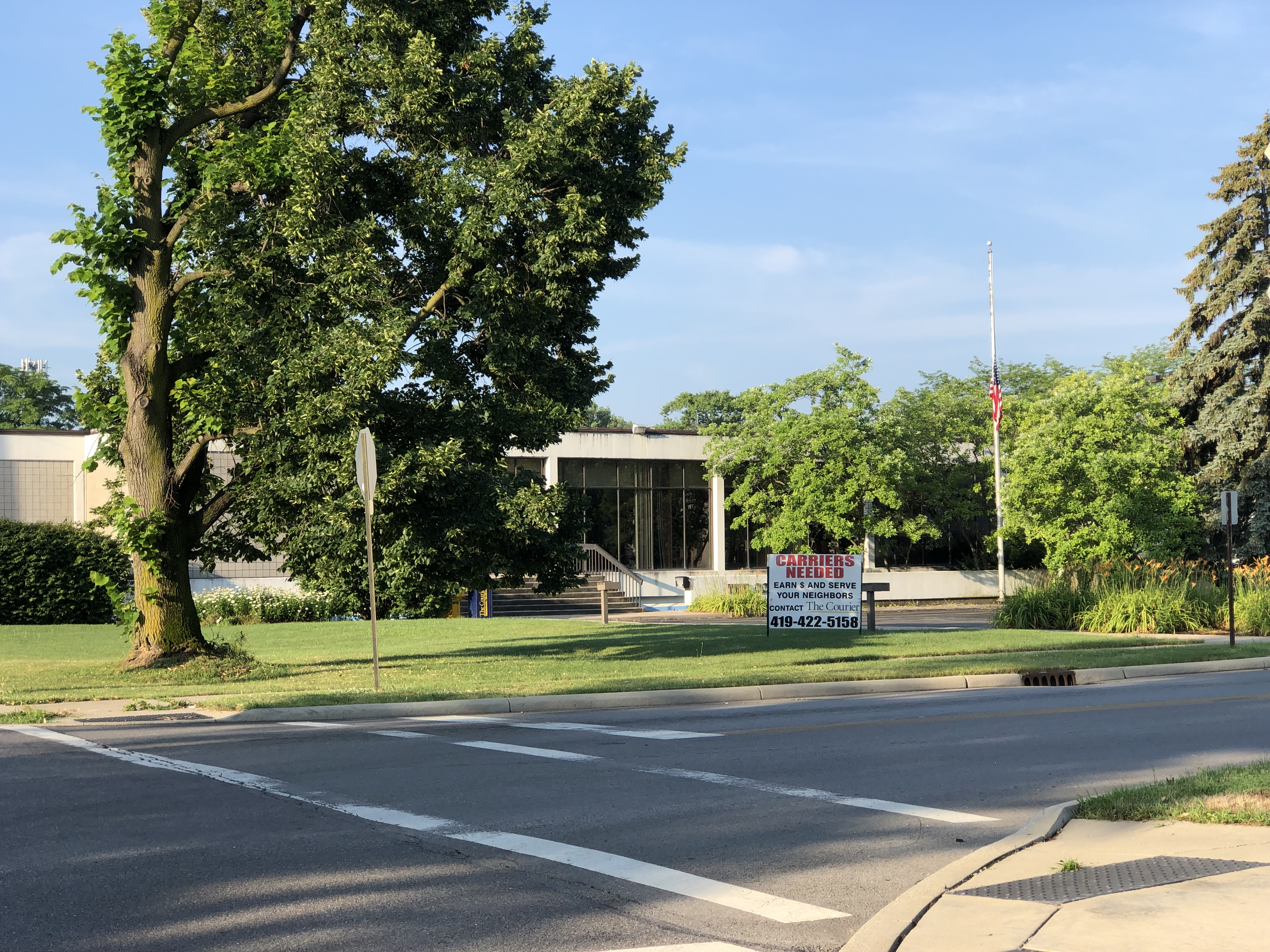
- Type: Daily newspaper
- Format: Broadsheet
- Owner: Ogden Newspapers
- Publisher: Jeremy Speer
- Editor: Bret Nye
- Founded: 1836
- Political alignment: Neutral
- Language: English
- Headquarters: Findlay, Ohio
- Circulation: 10,000 daily
- Sister newspapers: Review Times, The Tiffin Advertiser-Tribune, Norwalk Reflector, and Sandusky Register
- Website: thecourier.com

The Courier is a daily newspaper based in Findlay, Ohio. It is delivered primarily to Hancock County and parts of Wyandot, Putnam, Seneca, Wood, Allen and Henry counties in Ohio. It was owned and operated by the Heminger family of Findlay for 131 years before being sold in November 2019 to Ogden Newspapers of Wheeling, West Virginia. The Courier is still headquartered and published in Findlay.

== History ==
The first publication of The Courier was on November 10, 1836. The Republican-Courier was formed from the merger of the Morning Republican and the Daily Courier on the date of December 31, 1932.

Composing room workers unionized as part of the International Typographical Union, Local 260 in 1890 and lasted till 1981. The newspaper was known as the Republican Courier from 1945 to 1975. At one point in its history, Findlay had 11 local newspapers, but only The Courier is in circulation today.
