= Daily Herald (Utah) =

Newspaper of Utah County (Provo), Utah

- Type: Daily newspaper
- Format: Broadsheet
- Owner: Ogden Newspapers
- Publisher: Jim Konig
- Editor: Jared Lloyd; Ryan Christner
- Founded: 1873 (as the Provo Daily Times)
- Language: English
- Headquarters: 1200 Towne Center Blvd. STE1058; Provo, Utah 84601; USA
- Circulation: 32,000 daily 42,000 Thursday; 36,000 Sunday (as of 2013)
- Sister newspapers: Ogden Standard-Examiner
- ISSN: 0891-2777
- Website: heraldextra.com

The Daily Herald is a daily newspaper that covers news and community events in Utah County, central Utah. Much of the coverage focuses on the Provo-Orem metropolitan area in Utah Valley. (Note: Though the official name of the newspaper is the Daily Herald and "Provo" has not been part of the official name for nearly a century, the publication is frequently described as the Provo Daily Herald in part to distinguish from the many other newspapers using the Herald or Daily Herald name.)

The Daily Herald is owned by Ogden Newspapers. The paper has a daily circulation of 32,000, with a Thursday circulation of 42,000 and a Sunday circulation of 36,000, as of 2013. It also owns nine community publications in Utah and Sanpete counties.

== History ==
On August 1, 1873, the Provo Daily Times was established by Robert T. McEwan, Robert G. Sleater, Oscar F. Lyons and Joseph T. McEwan. It was published by Washington hand press. Business was poor, so the paper switched from a daily to a tri-weekly on April 7, 1874, and was soon renamed to the Provo Tri-Weekly Times.

A month later it was renamed again, this time to the Utah County Times, which ceased in late December 1875. Lyons and R.T. McEwan left, but Sleater and J.T. McEwan launched another newspaper on January 13, 1876, called the Utah County Advertiser, issued twice a week. The Advertiser ceased in July 1876. Sleater and J.T. McEwan then launched a third paper called the Utah County Enquirer on July 4, 1876. J.T. McEwan left the business in June 1877. With only 290 subscribers, Sleater called it quits on September 5, 1877.

Sleater was succeeded by John C. Graham, an Mormon-convert from England who was a prominent theater actor with the Salt Lake Theatre. He previously published the LDS Church-affiliated Millennial Star in Liverpool. Graham renamed the paper to the Territorial Enquirer and grew the circulation to 2,000 by July 1884. The paper was renamed to the Utah Enquirer on January 3, 1888, and expanded to daily publication on November 30, 1889. At its height under Graham, the paper employed 21 people and had a circulation of 4,700. Business declined amid the Panic of 1893.

On August 31, 1898, Fred Nelson published the first edition of the Utah County Democrat. On March 18, 1906, Graham died. A year later his daughter Mrs. Sarah "Sadie" Elmo Graham Haws sold the Enquirer to brothers Heber C. Hicks and Nephi C. Hicks, who then renamed the paper to the Provo Post. In March 1908, the Democrat was sold to William M. Roylance and George A. Storrs, with J. David Larson as editor. On January 2, 1909, the Democrat was renamed to the Provo Herald. In October 1910, Wilford F. Giles acquired the Herald, and on May 3, 1911, he sold it to Lester G. Baker and O.C. Soots. Soots soon left and J. David Larson bought a half interest a month later.

On February 10, 1912, Ira H. Masters and Sam H. Wood bought the Herald. Wood left the partnership after a few weeks. On March 31, 1921, Masters sold the Herald to Edward C. Rodgers, and on April 17, 1922, he expanded the paper into a daily. On May 9, 1924, Rodgers bought the Provo Post from the Hicks and merged it into the Daily Herald. That October, Rodgers sold the paper to W.H. Hornibrook. In 1926, Hornibrook sold the paper to James G. Scripps, eldest son of newspaper magnate E. W. Scripps. In 1996, Scripps League Newspapers was sold to Pulitzer, which in 2005 was acquired by Lee Enterprises.

In February 2009, the Daily Herald discontinued five weekly papers that covered northern Utah County: the American Fork Citizen, Pleasant Grove Review, Lehi Free Press, Lone Peak Press and Orem Times. In January 2011, the Daily Herald discontinued three weekly newspapers that covered southern Utah County: the Springville Herald, Spanish Fork Press, and Nebo Reporter. The Pyramid in Mount Pleasant was spared. In February 2013, the Daily Herald eliminated its opinion section and laid off 10% of staff, including the executive editor. In 2016, Lee Enterprises sold the Daily Herald to Ogden Newspapers. Two years later Ogden bought the Ogden Standard-Examiner.
