= Daily Press (Michigan) =

American newspaper

Escanaba Daily Press
- Type: Daily newspaper
- Format: Broadsheet
- Owner: Ogden Newspapers Inc.
- Publisher: Sarah Maki
- Editor: Brian Rowell
- Founded: 1909
- Headquarters: Escanaba, Michigan, U.S.
- Circulation: 5,596 Daily; 5,858 Sunday (as of 2022)
- Website: dailypress.net

The Daily Press is a newspaper published in Escanaba, Michigan, United States. The newspaper serves Delta, Schoolcraft, and northern Menominee counties. The Daily Press publishes editions Monday through Saturday. The newspaper offices are located at 600 Ludington St. in downtown Escanaba, Michigan. The Daily Press was founded as the Escanaba Morning Press on March 19, 1909. It competed with the Escanaba Mirror, an evening publication founded in the 1880s. On June 30, 1924, the Mirror was taken over by the Press and the evening paper was discontinued. Daily Press founder John P. Norton left the Press and most of the rest of his estate to the Escanaba Schools upon his death in 1951. The Press was sold shortly after to Frank Russell, publisher of the Marquette Mining Journal, with the proceeds used to create large scholarship program for graduating seniors, as directed by Norton’s will.The paper passed through a succession of owners before being bought by its current owner, The Ogden Newspapers. The newspaper remained a morning publication until 1947, when it switched to afternoons. From 1922 to 1978, the Daily Press was known as The Escanaba Daily Press.
