= The Daily Mining Gazette =

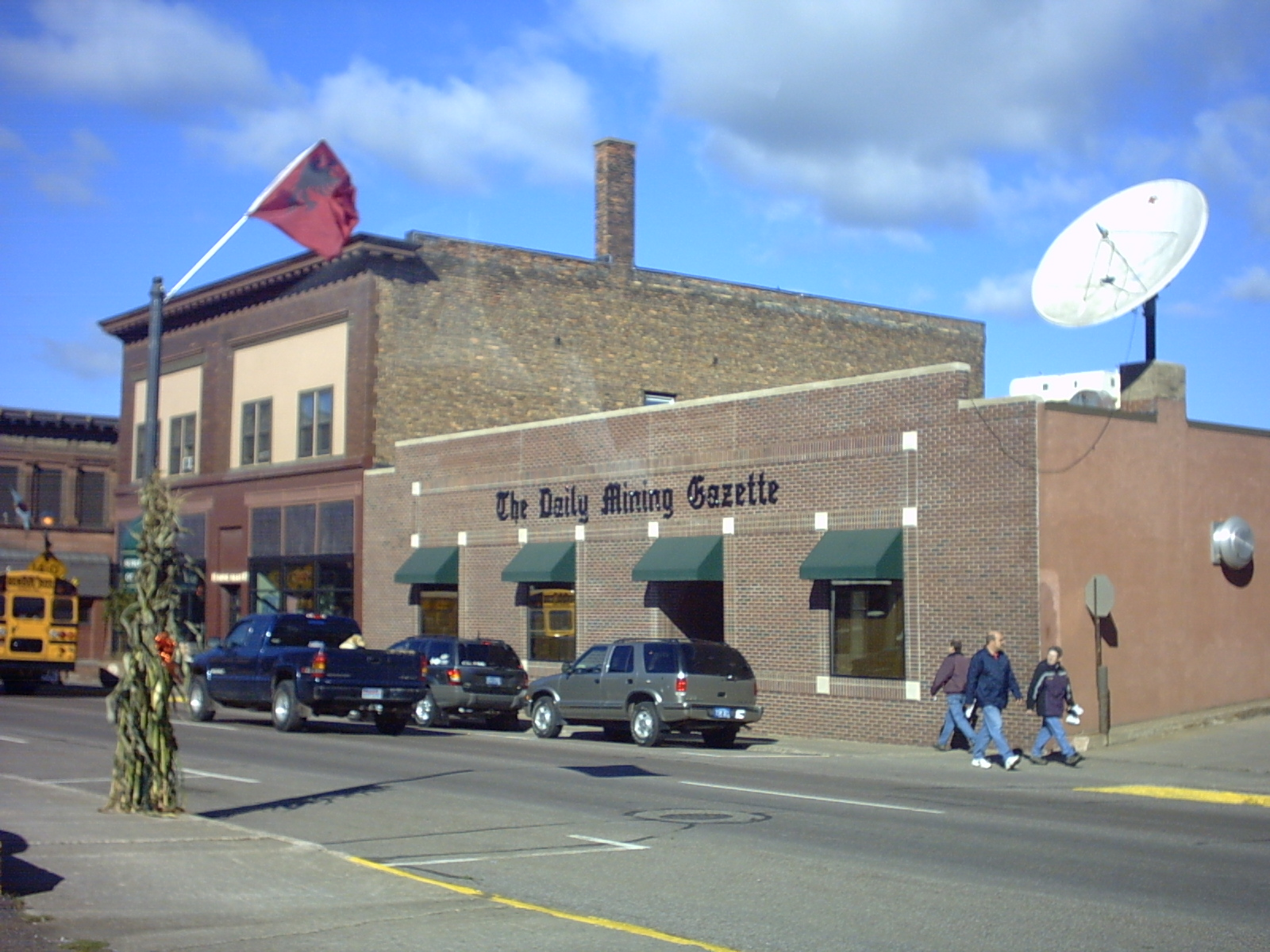
- Offices in Houghton
- Type: Daily newspaper
- Owner: Ogden Newspapers Inc.
- Publisher: Candace Wolf
- Editor: Candace Wolf
- Founded: July 1858
- Headquarters: Houghton, Michigan, U.S.
- Circulation: 4,504 (as of 2022)
- OCLC number: 9940134
- Website: mininggazette.com

The Daily Mining Gazette is a newspaper published in Houghton, Michigan. The paper is also distributed over most of the Upper Peninsula and some northern parts of the Lower Peninsula of Michigan. It is a daily Monday through Friday, with an expanded, combined Saturday-Sunday edition.

== History ==
The Mining Gazette was founded in Ontonagon, Michigan in July 1858 by George Emerson. In 1860, the paper was purchased by James R. Devereau and moved to Houghton, where it was published weekly as The Portage Lake Mining Gazette. The paper began daily publication on 14 September 1899.
