= Ogden Newspapers =

Newspaper and magazine publisher

Ogden Newspapers Inc.
- Type: Private
- Industry: Newspapers, Magazines, Yellow Pages
- Founded: 1890; 136 years ago
- Headquarters: Wheeling, West Virginia
- Key people: Bob Nutting (CEO and president); Duane D. Wittman (CFO); Bill Nutting (VP)
- Products: 54 daily newspapers 81 weekly newspapers, shoppers, and magazines
- Number of employees: 3,500
- Website: ogdennews.com

Ogden Newspapers Inc. is a Wheeling, West Virginia based publisher of daily and weekly newspapers, magazines, telephone directories, and shoppers guides. It has operations in California, Florida, Hawaii, Indiana, Iowa, Kansas, Maryland, Michigan, Minnesota, New Hampshire, New York, North Dakota, Ohio, Pennsylvania, Utah, Virginia and West Virginia, serving mostly small markets, such as Cape Coral, Florida, Fort Wayne, Indiana and Lawrence, Kansas.

== History ==
The company was founded by H.C. Ogden in 1890, and is currently run by the family of his grandson, G. Ogden Nutting. Current CEO Bob Nutting, son of G. Ogden Nutting, is the fourth generation of the Ogden-Nutting family to run the company, and is also principal owner of the Pittsburgh Pirates.

In October 1984, two Ogden newspapers (The Intelligencer and The Evening Journal) dropped the Doonesbury comic strip because they objected to Doonesbury's coverage of Ronald Reagan.

On January 30, 2018, it emerged that the company was the apparent high bid to purchase the bankrupt Charleston Gazette-Mail. It withdrew the bid on March 8, 2018. Also in March 2018, the company purchased all newspapers owned by the Byrd family. The sale included The Winchester Star, Daily News-Record, The Page News and Courier, The Warren Sentinel, The Shenandoah Valley-Herald and The Valley Banner.

On January 1, 2022, Ogden Newspapers took over Swift Communications, which has publications in Colorado, Utah, Nevada, and California. In 2024, Ogden purchased The Dominion Post of Morgantown, West Virginia. In 2025, Ogden agreed to license the content management system LocalRoad from CherryRoad Media. In 2026, Ogden sold The Maui News to a local nonprofit.

== Magazines ==
=== Kansas ===
- Grit (magazine)
- Mother Earth News
- Motorcycle Classics

== Newspapers ==
=== California ===
- Sierra Sun of Truckee
- Tahoe Daily Tribune of South Lake Tahoe

=== Colorado ===
- Craig Press of Craig, Colorado
- Glenwood Springs Post Independent of Glenwood Springs, Colorado
- Snowmass Sun of Snowmass Village, Colorado
- Sky-Hi News of Granby, Colorado
- Steamboat Pilot & Today in Steamboat Springs, Colorado
- Summit Daily News of Frisco, Colorado
- The Aspen Times of Aspen, Colorado
- The Citizen Telegram of Rifle, Colorado
- Vail Daily of Vail, Colorado

=== Florida ===
- Cape Coral Daily Breeze of Cape Coral, Florida
- Pine Island Eagle of Bokeelia, Florida
- The Journal Gazette of Fort Wayne, Indiana

=== Iowa ===
- Estherville Daily News of Estherville, Iowa
- Fort Dodge Messenger of Fort Dodge, Iowa
- Marshalltown Times Republican of Marshalltown, Iowa
- Tama-Toledo News Chronicle of Tama, Iowa
- North Tama Telegraph of Traer, Iowa
- Webster City Daily Freeman Journal of Webster City, Iowa

=== Kansas ===
- Lawrence Journal-World of Lawrence, Kansas

=== Maryland ===
- The Frederick News-Post of Frederick, Maryland

=== Michigan ===
- Alpena News of Alpena, Michigan
- The Daily Mining Gazette of Houghton, Michigan
- Daily Press of Escanaba, Michigan
- The Daily News of Iron Mountain, Michigan
- The Mining Journal of Marquette, Michigan

=== Minnesota ===
- Sentinel of Fairmont, Minnesota
- Marshall Independent of Marshall, Minnesota
- The Journal of New Ulm, Minnesota

=== New Hampshire ===
- The Telegraph of Nashua, New Hampshire

=== New York ===
- Adirondack Daily Enterprise of Saranac Lake, New York
- The Observer of Dunkirk, New York
- Leader Herald of Gloversville, New York (through July 31, 2021)
- Lake Placid News, a weekly of Lake Placid, New York
- The Post-Journal of Jamestown, New York
- Westfield Republican, a weekly of Westfield, New York

=== North Dakota ===
- Minot Daily News of Minot, North Dakota
- Pierce County Tribune of Rugby, North Dakota

=== Ohio ===
- The Courier of Findlay, Ohio
- Review Times of Fostoria, Ohio
- Herald-Star of Steubenville, Ohio
- Marietta Times of Marietta, Ohio
- Martins Ferry Times Leader of Martins Ferry, Ohio
- Morning Journal of Lisbon, Ohio
- Norwalk Reflector of Norwalk, Ohio
- The Review of East Liverpool, Ohio
- Salem News of Salem, Ohio
- Sandusky Register of Sandusky, Ohio
- Tiffin Advertiser Tribune of Tiffin, Ohio
- Warren Tribune Chronicle of Warren, Ohio
- The Vindicator of Youngstown, Ohio

=== Pennsylvania ===
- Altoona Mirror of Altoona, Pennsylvania
- Lewistown Sentinel of Lewistown, Pennsylvania
- Lock Haven Express of Lock Haven, Pennsylvania
- Observer-Reporter of Washington, Pennsylvania
- Warren Times Observer of Warren, Pennsylvania
- Williamsport Sun-Gazette of Williamsport, Pennsylvania
- The Herald-Standard of Uniontown, Pennsylvania

=== Utah ===
- Daily Herald of Provo, Utah
- Standard-Examiner of Ogden, Utah
- Pyramid-Daily Herald of Mount Pleasant, Utah

=== Virginia ===
- Northern Virginia Daily of Strasburg, Virginia
- Daily News-Record of Harrisonburg, Virginia
- The Winchester Star of Winchester, Virginia
- Loudoun Times-Mirror of Leesburg, Virginia

=== West Virginia ===
- The Dominion Post of Morgantown, West Virginia
- The Inter-Mountain of Elkins, West Virginia
- The Journal of Martinsburg, West Virginia
- The Parkersburg News and Sentinel of Parkersburg, West Virginia
- Weirton Daily Times of Weirton, West Virginia
- Wheeling Intelligencer of Wheeling, West Virginia
- The Shepherdstown Chronicle of Shepherdstown, West Virginia
- The Wetzel Chronicle of New Martinsville, West Virginia
- The Tyler Star News of Sistersville, West Virginia
