= The Review (East Liverpool) =

Daily newspaper in East Liverpool, Ohio

- Type: Daily newspaper
- Format: Broadsheet
- Owner(s): Ogden Newspapers
- Publisher: Tammie McIntosh
- Editor: J.D. Creer
- Founded: 1879; 146 years ago
- Headquarters: 210 East Fourth Street; East Liverpool, Ohio 43920; United States
- Circulation: 4,000 (Daily and Sunday)
- Website: reviewonline.com

The Review is an American daily newspaper based in East Liverpool, Ohio. It is published by Ogden Newspapers and reports on the city as well as the vicinity in Columbiana County, Ohio, and Hancock County, West Virginia.

== History ==
The paper was founded in 1879 by former Pittsburgh Gazette city editor William McCord as a weekly paper called The Saturday Review, launching on October 29 of that year. In 1885, the paper increased its publication to a daily basis, a frequency the paper maintains to the present. Following this change, the paper was retitled The Evening News Review.

In 1904, this was shortened to The Evening Review and by the 1930s, the paper had been retitled as the East Liverpool Review. Today, the paper is simply called The Review and is owned by Ogden Newspapers.
