= The Post-Journal =

Newspaper

- Type: Daily newspaper
- Format: Broadsheet
- Owner(s): Ogden Newspapers Inc.
- Publisher: Michael Bird
- Editor: John Whittaker
- Founded: 1826
- Language: English
- Headquarters: 15 West 2nd Street; Jamestown, NY 14702; United States
- Circulation: 13,023 Daily (as of 2017)
- Website: post-journal.com

The Post-Journal is a daily newspaper, serving the area around Jamestown, New York. The current editor of the paper is John Whittaker. It is owned by Ogden Newspapers Inc. and is billed as "southwestern New York's leading newspaper" with a circulation of over 10,000 newspapers. The morning newspaper is published six days a week, with the Saturday edition branded as the Weekender; a Sunday edition was launched in the early 1990s but was discontinued in 2019.

Its nearby sister publications include the Warren Times-Observer and the Dunkirk Observer.

== History ==
The Jamestown Journal (weekly) was founded in 1796 by Adolphus B. Fletcher. The Jamestown Journal (daily) was founded by Fletcher in June 1826. In 1941, the Jamestown Evening Journal and Jamestown Post consolidated.

On March 13, 2014, the entirety of the newspaper's Web site was placed behind a paywall. The paywall was removed November 1, 2016. The site had previously been behind a paywall for most of the early 2000s but that paywall was also removed.

On May 4, 2024, the Post-Journal began using the U.S. Postal Service for home delivery of the print edition.

== See also ==
- Jamestown, New York
- Chautauqua County, New York
