= Herald-Star =

The Herald-Star
- Type: Daily newspaper
- Owner: Ogden Newspapers
- Publisher: John Hale
- Editor: Ross Gallabrese
- Language: English
- Headquarters: 401 Herald Square, Steubenville, Ohio United States
- Website: heraldstaronline.com

The Herald-Star is a daily newspaper based in Steubenville, Ohio.

== History ==
Its history began in 1806 with the founding of the Western Herald by William Lowry and John Miller. Miller, who left the paper to fight in the War of 1812, eventually became governor of Missouri.

James Wilson, grandfather of US President Woodrow Wilson, purchased the paper in 1815 and served for 23 years as proprietor and editor.

In 1847, the theretofore weekly Herald published its first daily edition. The initiator of this move was William R. Allison, who owned and edited the paper from 1846 to 1873.

The paper merged with the Steubenville Star in 1897 to form the Herald-Star.

Brush-Moore Newspapers bought the paper in 1926. For a number of years, the paper was part of the Thomson Newspapers, who acquired Brush-Moore Newspapers in 1967.

Ogden Newspapers bought the paper from Thomson in 1996.
