= Martins Ferry Times Leader =

Daily newspaper in Ohio

- Type: Daily newspaper
- Owner: Ogden Newspapers
- Publisher: Lori Figurski
- Editor: Robert Kapral
- Headquarters: 200 S Fourth St, Martins Ferry Ohio 43935; United States
- Website: timesleaderonline.com

Martins Ferry Times Leader (also known as The Times Leader) is the daily newspaper serving Martins Ferry, Ohio. The Times Leader is published each afternoon, Saturday, and Sunday mornings.

The paper is owned by Ogden Newspapers.
