= The Yadkin Ripple =

Newspaper in Yadkinville, North Carolina

- Type: Weekly newspaper (Published Thursday afternoons)
- Format: Broadsheet
- Owner: Adams MultiMedia
- Publisher: Sandra Hurley
- Editor: Kitsey Burns Harrison
- Founded: 1892
- Headquarters: 115 Jackson Street; Yadkinville, North Carolina 27055; United States
- Country: United States
- Circulation: 864 (as of 2021)
- Website: yadkinripple.com

The Yadkin Ripple is a weekly newspaper based in Yadkinville, North Carolina. It was first published in East Bend, North Carolina, on October 18, 1892.

The Ripple, published on Thursdays, was purchased in June 2007 by Heartland Publications. It shares a publisher and its production staff with The Tribune in Elkin and is printed at The Mount Airy News.

== History ==
Mattie Johnson Hall, who used the pseudonym "Meddlesome Mattie," started The Ripple in East Bend in 1892. She named it after watching a ripple over a dam on the Yadkin River. In 1896, the paper was sold to attorney Elisha Stanford who moved the offices to Yadkinville. She in-turn sold The Ripple to Samuel Carter (S. Carter) Williams who in 1909 sold the publication to Mr Rutledge.

In 1909, it was sold to W.E. Rutledge Sr. (November 13, 1887 – April 2, 1966). Rutledge was owner, editor and publisher of the paper until his death in 1966. The paper remained in the Rutledge family until 2002 when it was sold to Mid-South Management Company Inc. of Spartanburg, South Carolina. The Yadkin Enterprise, another weekly Yadkinville newspaper, then merged into The Ripple.

In June 2007, The Ripple and its sister publications were sold to Heartland Publications LLC of Connecticut. A week after the sale, Rebel Good, publisher of The Ripple and The Tribune, left his position along with a number of senior staffers. Good and former Mount Airy News publisher Michael Milligan plan to launch a newspaper to compete with The Mount Airy News.

In 2012 Versa Capital Management merged Heartland Publications, Ohio Community Media, the former Freedom papers it had acquired, and Impressions Media into a new company, Civitas Media. Civitas Media sold its properties in the Carolinas to Champion Media in 2017. Later in 2017, Champion Media sold its Mount Airy area newspapers to Adams Publishing Group.
