= Sedalia Democrat =

Newspaper in Sedalia, Missouri

- Type: Daily newspaper
- Format: Broadsheet
- Owner: Carpenter Media Group
- Publisher: Jamila Khalil
- Editor: Nicole Cooke
- Founded: 1868, as Democratic Press
- Headquarters: 111 W. Fourth St., Sedalia, Missouri 65301, United States
- Circulation: 4,000 daily
- ISSN: 1061-1762
- Website: sedaliademocrat.com

The Sedalia Democrat is an American daily newspaper published in Sedalia, Missouri. It publishes a print edition five days a week, Tuesday through Saturday.

== History ==
It was founded in 1868 as the Democratic Press, a weekly newspaper. It became the Sedalia Democrat soon after. It began its daily edition, originally called the Daily Democrat, December 19, 1871 until 1873. It was also published as the Sedalia Weekly Democrat from 1872 and the Sedalia Evening Democrat from 1891 until 1906. In 1906 it merged with the Sedalia Evening Sentinel, a newspaper published from 1896 until 1906 and as the Sedalia Sentinel in 1906. The Sentinel published the infamous poem "Niggers in the White House." It was succeeded by the Sedalia Democrat-Sentinel published from 1907 until 1911. In 1912 it returned to being called the Sedalia Democrat and has continued under that title to the present.

In 1995, it became part of the Freedom Communications chain; it was sold in May 2012 to Ohio Community Media. The Democrat was one of three daily newspapers that Ohio Community Media owned outside the state of Ohio. The other two were the Journal-Courier and The Telegraph in Illinois. These three newspapers, along with The Lima News in Ohio, constituted Freedom's Central Division. September 11, 2012, Versa Capital Management, LLC (Versa), a private equity investment firm, announced the creation of Civitas Media, LLC (Civitas), a new community news media company. Civitas, Latin for “community” or “citizen,” combined four media entities owned by Versa: Freedom Communications Central, Heartland Publications, Impressions Media, and Ohio Community Media.

In 2017, Civitas Media sold the Sedalia Democrat to Phillips Media Group. In 2024, the newspaper was sold again to Carpenter Media Group.
