= The Hazard Herald =

Weekly newspaper based in Hazard, Kentucky

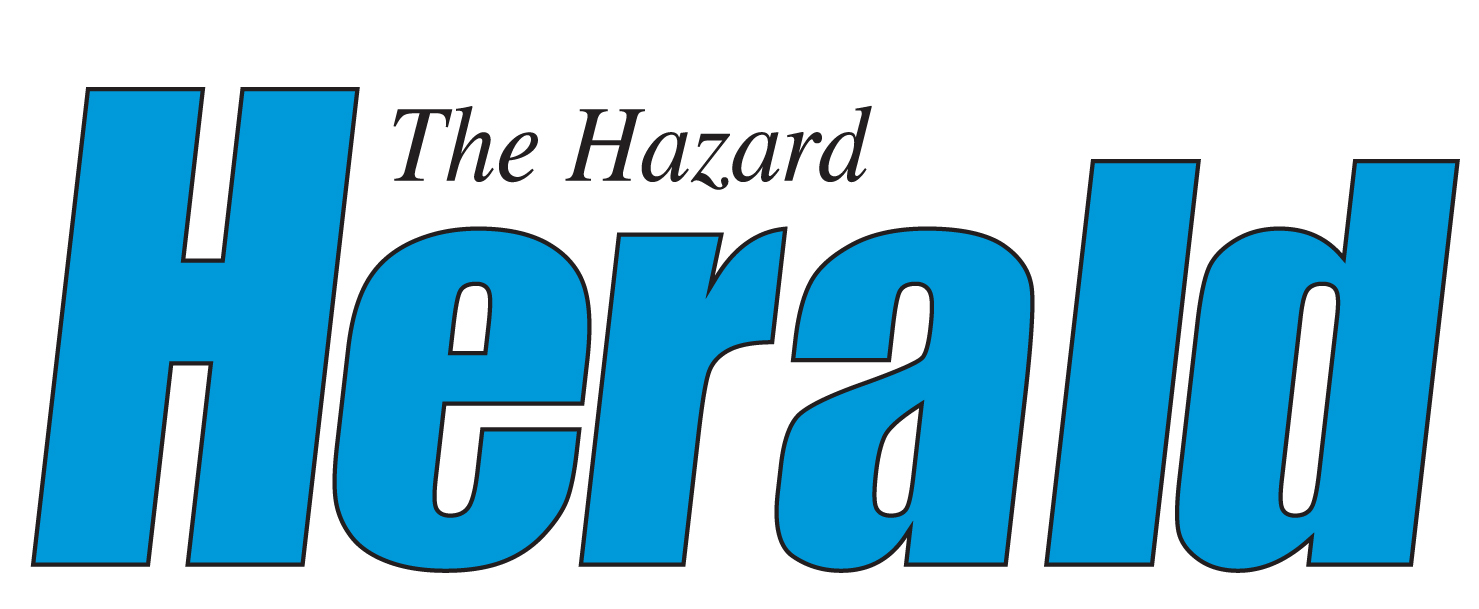
- Type: Weekly newspaper
- Format: Broadsheet
- Owner: Lancaster Management
- Publisher: Jeff Vanderbeck
- Editor: Justin Begley
- Managing editor: Russ Cassady
- Founded: 1911
- Political alignment: Middle
- Language: English
- Headquarters: Hazard, Kentucky
- Circulation: 6,125
- Sister newspapers: Appalachian News Express, Paintsville Herald, Floyd County Chronicle & Times, Mingo Messenger
- Website: Official website

The Hazard Herald is a weekly newspaper based in Hazard, Kentucky. The newspaper was founded by Bailey P. Wootton in 1911. The paper celebrated 100 years on June 22, 2011. Today the paper is located at 100 Cooksey Street in downtown Hazard and comes out every Wednesday morning.

== History ==
=== 1911–1919 ===
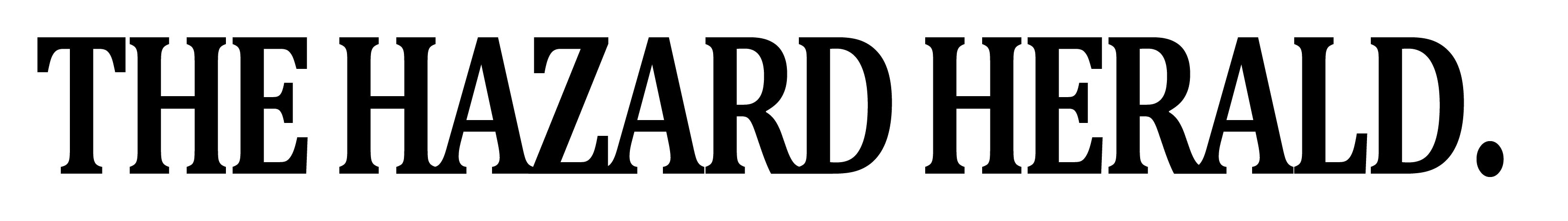
The banner from the third issue of The Hazard Herald. The third issue only survives on micro film and is the earliest copy of the paper that can still be found.

The first edition of The Hazard Herald was hand set and came off the gasoline powered printing press on June 22, 1911. Though there does not seem to be a copy of that first edition still in existence, the effect the Herald had on the local community during its first decade is certainly on record. The Herald was operated by its founder and president at the time, Bailey P. Wootton, along with officers George W. Humphries, James B. Hoge and W.C. Trosper. During that first year, a one-year subscription to the Herald could be purchased for one dollar as the paper's staff covered the growth of Hazard, which at the time was still looking forward to the coming of the railroad a year later, a move that would open up a town that in the years prior was a remote hamlet nearly cut off by the rough and tumble foothills of the Appalachian Mountains.

The first train arrived in Hazard in 1912, and the railroad not only opened avenues of travel in and out of the county, but it also paved the way for a more robust coal industry, as noted in the Herald's October 7, 1912 edition: "It will not be long before the coal from this city will be counted by the trainloads instead of the carload." Other notable events during the decade include a fire in December 1913 that ravaged the business section of town, destroying $50,000 worth of property, according to a headline of the day. Consumed in the fire was the D.Y. Combs Hotel as well as the offices of Drs. Gross and Hurst.

On August 17, 1914, the Herald reported on the first automobile to arrive in Perry County: "Last Thursday, Hazard and Perry county (sic) were honored by the first automobile ever inside the county limits. We have had the railroad trains upward of two years, and that has ceased to be a wonder; we have had one autocycle, which remained for a few days and departed from whence it came. But the crowning glory of all was the advent of the Ford touring car which passed through our city last Thursday. Now we are on the qui vive for the first aeroplane."

While the Herald maintained a local flavor during its first decade, in this age before the Internet and instant news delivery, the paper also made note of issues of national importance. By 1918, World War I ended with the abdication of Kaiser Wilhelm II on November 9. The Herald carried the story with the headline: "War Is Ended; Kaiser Abdicates."

By the end of the decade, the paper's yearly subscription rate had increased to $1.50 while Bailey Wootton remained the president of the Herald Publishing Company, and John B. Horton has been serving as the editor.

=== 1920–1929 ===
The 1920s began with the Herald's founder remaining in control as publisher. John B. Horton had been serving as the editor, and the Herald had also carried over from the previous decade a habit of weekly printing "The Herald's Platform for Hazard," still keeping in line with the publishing every Thursday, the Herald remained the county's main source of information, and in 1922 moved into a new building on High Street.

It was during this decade that the Herald began offering joint subscriptions with Kentucky's oldest newspaper, The Courier-Journal of Louisville. A one-year subscription for both papers could be purchased for a tidy sum of $6. The Herald also began advertising its job department, which was equipped as a printer service, specializing in ruled mine forms. Prohibition was a heavy topic during the 1920s, with regular arrests of moonshiners being made.

In 1926, with Wootton remaining as publisher, Carroll Wilson became the editor and Arthur M. Hernon was serving as advertising manager. It was perhaps a weather event that defined the decade for Hazard, as the flood of 1927 brought with it thousands of dollars' worth of destruction, and the Herald was there to cover it. According to reports in the June 10, 1927 edition of The Hazard Herald, the Lothair community of Perry County suffered a loss of approximately $200,000 in total. The report reads: "The combined loss of the four camps and the business section of Lothair from the flood has been estimated as being in the neighborhood of $200,000. The hardest hit was the Ky. & West Virginia Power Company, which suffered a loss of $75,000 in the plant and $12,000 in the camp."

In 1928, the paper also covered the Carr Creek basketball team who made it to the state championship game. An editorial was published in March 1928 that praised the Carr Creek team as its members "live clean lives, think pure thoughts, go to bed early, study hard, are accustomed to physical hardships and are unspoiled by worshiping undergraduates and alumni." The editorial noted that the Carr Creek boys were the talk of Richmond and Lexington where tales of their exploits centered on their backwoods lifestyle, not being accustomed to trains and automobiles: "Their reason for success is not that they live in the 'romantic' Cumberlands, beyond the pale of civilization; but rather that they have not had the opportunity to become contaminated with the loose-living, fast-moving, sensation-seeking younger sets of our more thickly populated towns and cities." It was during this decade that the paper also began a second publication day, printing every Tuesday and Friday then in 1929, Overton S. Warren became editor-manager.

=== 1930–1939 ===
The 1930s were a period of growth for the Herald, with founder Bailey Wootton still head of the Herald Publishing Company, but his sights were also set on political office.

In 1931, Wootton, a Democrat, won the election for Kentucky's Attorney General, and in 1935 was announced on the front page of The Hazard Herald as a "Probable Candidate" for governor. A small, one-column mugshot stood atop a cutline, which read: "Mr. Wootton, attorney general and chairman of the State Democratic Central Committee, is being mentioned as a candidate for the Democratic nomination for Governor of Kentucky." Wootton did run in the Democratic primary, and lost to eventual governor A.B. "Happy" Chandler.

Just as the success of the Carr Creek basketball squad in the 1920s brought sports coverage to the front page, Hazard High School's own state championship team kept sports events front and center.

The Herald's March 24, 1932 edition detailed Hazard's "thrilling" victory over Louisville Male by a final score of 15-13 on a field goal by Morton Combs, which "crowned Hazard the best boys' team in Kentucky." The Herald's coverage included several letters of congratulation, including from Mayor of Louisville William B. Harrison, who wrote to Hazard Mayor J.C. Steele: "As long as the boys from my old school, Louisville Male High, had to be defeated, I know of no one to whom I would rather extend my congratulations than you." More than 1,000 people assembled on the square in Hazard to welcome the team, according to the Herald's coverage, as they returned to town from the tournament in Lexington.

The Great Depression was also a major factor across the nation in the 1930s, and times at The Hazard Herald were no different. In his book, The Hazard Herald and other Perry County Newspapers, Charles Wooton, who was first hired on at the Herald in 1933 as a printer's devil, noted that "times were hard" at the paper, and O.S. Warren, the paper's advertising manager, "had problems collecting enough from advertisers and job customers to meet payroll." The paper's press was eventually repossessed, but Wooton was able to locate another press and kept the paper in print.

The Herald continued to cover local items of interest. On September 16, 1936, the paper carried the story of the death of Miss Katharine Pettit, founder of the Hindman Settlement School in Knott County. Pettit was a nationally renowned educator and winner of the Algernon Sidney Sullivan Award for outstanding service to the people of Kentucky.

Coal continued as heavy figure in the Herald's coverage in 1937. A headline in the paper's September 2 edition proclaims coal as "The First and Best Source of Power." The resource was described as "black gold" in the same article in which plans were being made for the city's Labor Day carnival, billed as the Hazard Coal Carnival. It was held on September 6 of that year, celebrating the 25th anniversary of the founding of the Hazard coal fields. The carnival included a "mile long parade," a fireworks display, the annual golf tournament and an hour of continuous entertainment, as well as the crowning of the Hazard Coal Queen. Along with items of jubilation such as carnivals and state championships, the Herald also told the tales of the other side of society, just as it did on July 20, 1939 with the photo of Jack Davis, who was convicted of slaying Abram Combs on July 8, 1938. Davis, the item noted, was set to die by electric chair at midnight on July 20.

Only two weeks later, on August 4, 1939, The Hazard Herald became The Hazard Daily Herald, printed every evening except Sundays to keep the public informed on news of the fighting in Europe that would eventually draw in the United States and spark World War II.

=== 1940–1949 ===
The Hazard Herald went through many changes in the 1940s. In 1939 Germany invaded Poland and local people wanted a way to quickly get up-to-date news about the war in Europe. The only daily papers that could be bought in the region were from Louisville and Lexington and were a day old by the time they got to Perry County. As a result, The Hazard Herald became a daily newspaper in August 1939 and printed six days a week throughout the 1940s. Bailey Wootton continued as publisher, although mostly ceremonially, from Frankfort. Charles Wooton was made editor-manager of the paper. Charles Wooton hired a public relations and advertising businessman named Ivey Peebles. Peebles was from Jackson, Mississippi. He started selling advertising with year-long contracts which had never been done before at The Hazard Herald. With the change in staffing and frequency of printing came a name change, The Hazard Daily Herald. The paper became a member of the Associated Press Wire Service that gave them rights to up-to-date war news that could be printed in the paper and delivered to residents of Perry County in a timely manor. The circulation rate went up to over 4,000 and could be bought for 25 cents a week. The papers were sold in stores that surrounded coal mines called "Little Merchant." Staff at The Hazard Daily Herald started to gain recognition for their efforts when they won second place as best small daily for the state of Kentucky in 1940.

In 1941, Bailey Wootton and his family returned to Hazard from Frankfort after spending a term as Kentucky Attorney General and a term as Director of the Department of Forestry. He continued as publisher, although in a more active role. Wootton's wife, Clara Wootton, was added to the staff of The Hazard Daily Herald. Charles Wooton and Clara Wootton had difficulty working together, Wooton noted in his book about the history of newspapers in Perry County. At this time, Charles Wooton and his father owned the majority of the stock in the company. Wooton's father, E.C. Wooton, had been a partner in Bailey Wootton's law firm and gave his shares to him. Bailey then bought five more shares in the company. This gave him the controlling number of shares. Bailey then bought out the rest of Charles's shares in the paper. Charles then decided to leave the company.

The Hazard Daily Herald printed war news on the front cover of nearly every issue through 1945. They had such headlines as: "Hiroshima becomes valley of the dead" and "Third fleet roaming in Japs waters." After the Japanese surrender during World War II, Hazard residents held a citywide celebration. The spontaneous party was described in the Herald as one of the "greatest and noisiest in city's history." After the war the Herald continued as a daily paper. They still used the wire service for many national and international stories, although they began turning their focus back to more local issues. Bailey P. Wootton had been president and publisher of the Herald since he founded it, but in 1945 he relinquished control and George L. Carey became publisher, with R. W. Griffith as managing editor.

In 1948 Perry County was gripped with a debate over becoming a wet or dry county. The July 4 headline read "Perry Votes Wet." The previous paper, July 2, 1948, had five advertisements urging voters to vote to be a wet county. During the 1940s, the Herald ran a weekly "funnies" section that could be bought for just 10 cents. The section came out on Sundays and boasted some of the first color printing the newspaper had ever used.

In the latter part of the 1940s, R.D. Maney replaced R.W. Griffith as manager-editor, and Leslie Wilson was made news editor. Bailey Wootton moved back to Frankfort in 1946, where he would die of cancer at the age of 79, on April 16, 1949. He was buried in Frankfort Cemetery. In 1949 the Hazard radio station, WKIC, bought the Herald, which for a time carried the slogan: "Read it in the Herald, hear on WKIC."

=== 1950–1959 ===
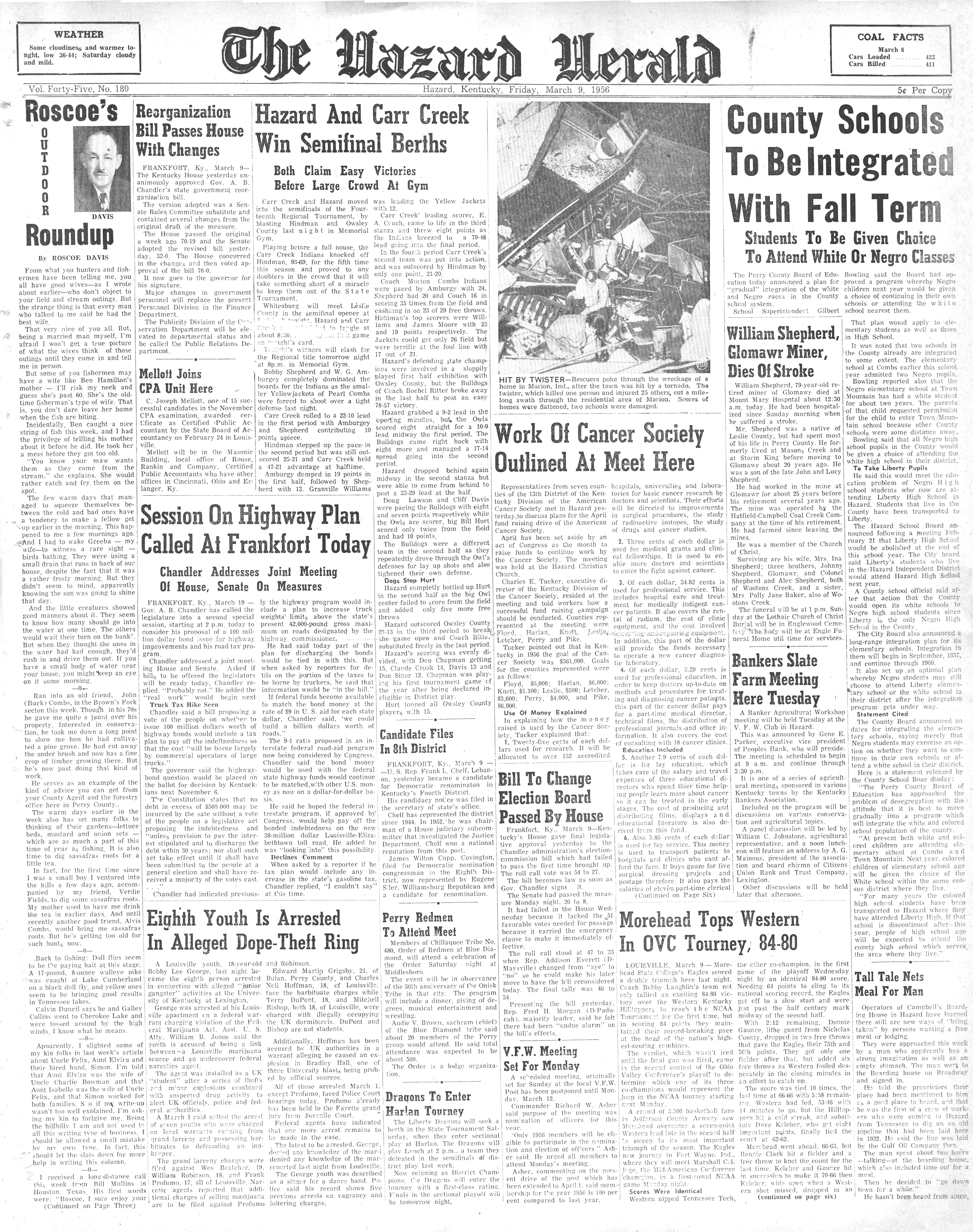
The March 9, 1956 issue of The Hazard Herald.

The Hazard Herald continued as a daily paper throughout most of the 1950s, switching to a twice weekly in the latter part of the decade. The newspaper was printed six days a week through 1956. In the early 1950s the newspaper continued to use the AP's wire service. The paper continued to be owned and printed by the Hazard Publishing Company. Fred B. Bullard was the publisher with John Potisek as editor. In 1953, the newspaper started to focus more on local news. After several years, the paper stopped using the wire service. The newspaper started to print fewer pages but with more of their own reporting. During this time, Kyle Whitehead was made publisher and managing editor and Otis Perkins was editor. The year 1956 marked a large amount of change in Perry County as well as in The Hazard Herald. Perry County Schools began to be integrated in the fall of 1956 after the school board decided to close the only African American school in the county by the end of the school year in 1957. Students were given the choice to stay at their African American school for that year or enroll at a different school. That year also saw a change in ownership for the Herald. The owners of the Mountain Eagle, Martha and Pearl Nolan, of Whitesburg, Kentucky, decided to sell their paper and bought the Herald . The Nolan's turned the paper into a twice a week paper that printed on Mondays and Thursdays. W.P. Nolan was the Publisher and Fred W. Luigart Jr. managing editor. In 1956, the Nolan's moved the Herald offices to a building on North Main Street. Previous to the move, the newspaper had been in the Herald Building, which was built by the paper's founder, Bailey P. Wootton.

The largest flood recorded in Hazard happened on January 29, 1957. The North Fork of the Kentucky River rose 38 feet and flooded all of Main Street. Businesses all along Main Street were destroyed. According to records, over 50 homes were swept off their foundations. The Hazard Herald's new office was hit hard by the floodwater. The office lost a lot of equipment, but more importantly nearly all of the archived newspapers from the early days of the paper were destroyed. The only copies of the papers from before the 1940s that exist can be found on microfilm at the Perry County Library.

=== 1960–1969 ===
In the early 1960s, The Hazard Herald was a "semi-weekly" newspaper, publishing twice a week on Mondays and Thursdays. Martha and Pearl Nolan remained as owners. During this decade the staff also put out a weekly paper called the Mountain Messenger, which was slated as being "published in the interest of the people of Knott, Leslie, and Perry County." The Publisher was W. P. Nolan and Fred W. Luigart Jr was the managing editor in 1960. Luigart was replaced when he left to assume the position of Washington DC correspondent for the Courier Journal and Louisville Times in 1962 by W.P. Nolan who took on the role of both editor and publisher. Nolan remained the editor and publisher throughout the rest of the 1960s and into the 1970s. The only other person to hold an editor position during the 1960s was Gurney Norman. Norman was from Allais and went to the University of Kentucky and earned a degree in English and journalism. He then joined the army for two years. In 1963, he returned to Eastern Kentucky and became a staff writer for the Herald. He had written for the newspaper since the late 1950s but had not joined the staff. By 1964 he was listed as assistant editor. Norman was with the paper until 1966 when he left to focus on his fiction writing. He went on to become a well-known author and professor at the University of Kentucky. In 2009 he was named Kentucky's poet laureate.

In November 1963 President John F. Kennedy was assassinated. The Hazard Herald ran an article about the passing of the president on the front page their Thanksgiving issue. One of the largest changes to the community was the forming of Hazard ARH. The largest hospital in Hazard had been The Miners Memorial Hospital, which was operated by United Mine Workers Welfare and Retirement Fund. The Fund ran ten hospitals in the region since the mid-1950s. In 1963, Appalachian Regional Hospitals was formed and took over these 10 facilities, forming Hazard ARH and creating a well-rounded healthcare system. Ever since the Nolans took over the newspaper the focus shifted toward local content written by local reporters. This became an even larger part of the paper as more and more people had access to national television broadcasts and no longer counted on the newspaper for national news. Several local reoccurring columns emerged like "Hill Talk," which focused on events at the area schools. In February 1968 Robert F. Kennedy came to Hazard as a part of his Tour of Appalachia. He announced his candidacy for president within a week of coming to Hazard. According to news reports at the time, residents feared that Senator Kennedy's visit was going to be a publicity stunt showing the people of Eastern Kentucky as backwards "and with out hope." Once he announced his candidacy for president it became apparent that this tour was a campaign stop. In July 1969 Apollo 11 carried the first human to the moon. The Herald put the news on the front page of the July 24 issue with the headline reading "Apollo 11 Lands Safely."

=== 1970–1979 ===
W.P. Nolan was the publisher and editor of the Herald as the 1970s began, and a one-year subscription could be purchased for $10.50 for local residents. For both the Herald and for its town, the decade marked a number of changes. In Hazard, several businesses sprang up and a new mayor was elected in 1978 who would help transform the face of the city over the next three decades. Competition was also a steady influence on the Herald in the 1970s, especially from the East Kentucky Voice, owned and operated by former Herald reporter Oscar Combs, who has since gone on to head the successful and popular Cats Pause magazine. Combs operated the Voice until 1975 which, according to Charles Wooton, which "became a topnotch weekly and grew rapidly, making heavy inroads on all newspaper circulation and advertising in Perry County."

The year 1975 was a busy one for the Herald as it was sold to Worrell Newspapers and Donald Gipson was named president and publisher. The paper's office moved to East Main Street, and it was that same year the Herald and The East Kentucky Voice merged, forming the Hazard Herald-Voice newspaper, with Gipson staying on as publisher and Edmund Shelby as news editor. In an editorial published in the October 20, 1975 edition of the Herald-Voice, Gipson announced the merger and noted an "increased sense of responsibility for providing fair and thorough news coverage and responsible advertising." Billed as the "Courier of the East Kentucky Coal Fields," the Herald-Voice continued publishing each week, just as the City of Hazard continued to grow.

New businesses and other areas of progress were springing up across the county. The Daniel Boone Parkway (now called Hal Rogers Parkway), extending from Hazard to London opened in June 1975, while construction began on the Hazard Magic Mart three months later. The Citizens Bank, now known as Community Trust, opened a branch on Main Street in April 1975. Perhaps the most defining event of the decade came in November 1977 as Hazard businessman William D. Gorman was elected mayor, defeating Lester Roberts by more than 800 votes. It was Gorman's first term as an elected official in the city, and it was an office he would hold until his death in October 2010. Gorman's tenure at City Hall was as successful as it was lengthy. He oversaw the construction of the new City Hall, the expansion of the city interests to what is now referred to as "Hospital Hill," Jacklot Hollow and the Daniel Boone Shopping Center, and was present to help introduce a myriad of new businesses to the area. He also played an important role in the expansion of water service to several areas of the county, making water service one of his number one priorities while in office. Mayor Gorman would also become a frequent name on the front page of the Herald over the next 30 years, but change with the Herald's staff was also continuing. The decade ended with Berkely F. Scott as publisher, Bobby Watson as general manager and editor, and Erin O' Donnell as associate editor and later editor.

=== 1980–1989 ===
The Hazard Herald became The Herald-Voice in 1975 and remained the Herald-Voice throughout the 1980s. The newspaper was weekly and came out every Thursday. Scripps Newspaper League bought the Newspaper in 1978 and continued to publish the paper until 1988 when it was then published by the Perry County Publishing Company. Jack Thomas was the editor and publisher of the paper throughout the 1980s. While Scripps owned the newspaper, the staff had more editors than they would have for the rest of the decade. They wrote more stories for the paper, making it a near entirely local paper.

The newspaper began to run profiles of people within the community frequently. In 1981, they had the "Pep Spotlight" which showed members of the local cheer squads as well and the "Players of the week," showing football and basketball players from M.C. Napier High School and Hazard High School. The newspaper also began showcasing the history of Hazard by running pieces about local historical events on the front page. Many of the pieces were taken from old papers. The paper also boasted a food and nutrition section. The section gave tips on creating healthy meals, how to keep leftovers and recipes. The food section also had news stories pertaining to raising food prices. This section was a great way for advertisers to focus on a specific consumer, so the section held all of the food ads as well as weekly coupons.

In September 1981, for the Black Gold Festival the stars of the "Dukes of Hazzard" came to Hazard. The attendance for the festival was the highest it had ever been with thousands turning out to see the television stars. The Herald-Voice reported that 100,000 spectators turned out to see the "Dukes" opening parade of the festival.

In 1988, plans were made for a mall to come to Hazard. The Black Gold Shopping Mall's plans were revealed on May 18. Ground was broken for the center the same day, and the mall was to be the first of its kind in Perry County and was slated to cost $50 million. The shopping center was to hold a JC Penney, Watsons and Walmart.

In October 1989 flooding hit Hazard, causing the North Fork of the Kentucky River to rise to 27 feet. According to the Herald-Voice, the flooding was sudden and was the first major flood in over five years. The Hazard Herald-Voice celebrated its 200th paper under that name on September 14, 1989. The paper had changed names five times at this point in its 79-year existence.

=== 1990–1999 ===
Still more changes were in store at the Herald as 1989 gave way to a new decade. Jack Thomas remained publisher while Rex Boggs continued as editor, a combination that would remain intact until October 1994. The Herald's sports pages also gained a now well-known name as Jay Crawford pulled double duty, reporting also for WYMT-TV. As many know, Crawford has since gone on to gain notoriety as the host of ESPN's "Second Take." Much like the previous two decades, the City of Hazard saw a lot of progress during the decade, first in March 1990 as construction got underway at the Black Gold Mall for fast food restaurant Rax and the Watson's and JC Penney department stores. Walmart had opened it doors there the year before.

In 1994, as several officials were sworn into office following the 1993 election, the staff at the Herald remained the same, but only 10 months later Editor Rex Boggs announced his departure on the front page, as Publisher Jack Thomas took over editing duties as well. During the 1990s, color also became a mainstay on the front page, where grayscale photography had been the norm. Red lettering marked the occasion when the M.C. Napier Lady Navajos took home the state basketball championship, while a story just below marked the end of an era for local radio broadcasting as Ernest Sparkman was set to call his final Sweet 16 game on radio station WSGS.

The Herald also began reporting on a more disturbing trend in the mountains – illegal drug trafficking. A May 19, 1994 story written by Boggs details the arrest of 27 people in Perry County on suspicion of dealing illegal drugs. Such roundups would become a sad part of life in the mountains in the coming years. Another personnel change for the Herald's staff was announced on October 2, 1997, as Mike Rindahl was named publisher and Paul David Taulbee was promoted to managing editor while Midge Bowling remained advertising manager. Owned by American Publishing Company out of Marion, Illinois, the Herald-Voice, as it was known then, cost 50 cents per copy, and a one-year subscription could be purchased for $17. The following year, Jenny Jones was named circulation manager, a position which she still holds at the paper today. It was on October 9, 1997, without any fanfare, that the paper reverted to its old title, The Hazard Herald, and dropped the "Voice" all together. The following year, the paper covered another significant local election during which a one-term Magistrate named Denny Ray Noble captured the county judge's seat, an office he still holds today in an unprecedented fourth term.

On July 7, 1999, the Herald published its "Presidential Edition," marking the visit of President Bill Clinton, who gave a speech to a welcoming crown during a very hot summer day on Hazard's Main Street. "Pres. Clinton brings message of prosperity," the headline read, and a special supplement to the paper contained photos and a detailed story on the president's visit. The 1990s closed with Rindahl still serving as the Herald's publisher.

=== 2000–2009 ===
The new millennium would bring with it a new set of challenges for an industry that for decades relied on a print product to keep the public informed. With the use of the Internet becoming much more widespread, other methods of news delivery became more and more popular. In 2000, the Herald continued its tradition of local news coverage, but in only a few years the Internet would push for one of the biggest changes the paper has undertaken. The Hazard Herald launched the first version of its online presence in 2004. Since then, hazard-herald.com has remained an online presence for local news coverage and information, recently joining in on the popularity of social networking with pages on Facebook and Twitter. Today, hazard-herald.com provides daily news updates, obituaries and other content, but at the turn of the century the Herald remained a print-only product.

Mike Rindahl remained as publisher until 2003, and after a few months without a publisher in name, parent company Community Newspaper Holdings, Inc. announced the promotion of Rodney Heath Wiley to the position on December 17, 2003. Wiley had served as the composing director at the Herald's sister publication, the Floyd County Times, prior to his promotion to the Hazard property. In 2004, the Herald, along with sister publications in Harlan, Prestonburg and Middlesboro, were sold to a newly formed company called Heartland Publications. That same year, Wiley named former Times reporter Sheldon Compton the managing editor of the Herald, a position he would hold for roughly a year before departing the paper's staff. Midge Bowling, who began her career in the composing room of the Herald, continued to serve as advertising manager. The first half of the decade included much controversy on the local scene, first with the local county school board and an investigation into the superintendent's contract, which ultimately turned up no wrongdoing. Another investigation saw a circuit judge indicted by a federal grand jury and subsequently convicted. Besides controversy, the Herald also chronicled growth in Perry County during that first half as well, from the extension of waterlines to outlying communities to the opening of the Daniel Boone Shopping Center along the Carl D. Perkins Parkway. The second half of the decade began with Wiley remaining as publisher, but with no editor-in-name on staff. Cris Ritchie and Randy Walters, both staff reporters, made up the paper's editorial staff at the time.

Much of the news coverage of the time dealt with the region's ongoing problem with prescription drug abuse. With the inception of Operation UNITE, a federally funded drug task force formed in 2003, the fight against drug abuse continued making headlines throughout the decade, and continues today. On March 8, 2006, Luke Keith, Jr., the former owner and operator of the Sentinel-Echo in London, was named publisher of the Herald, while only a few months later Erica Slone took over as advertising manager. In September of that year, Ritchie left the paper for a brief stint at WYMT-TV in Hazard before returning to the Herald in December to fill the open editor's position, a role in which he still serves today. More controversy made the headlines in 2007, as two union strikes rocked the Hazard ARH, but it was other stories that had more lasting effects. Then state Senator Daniel Mongiardo became the first native of Perry County to hold statewide office as he ascended to his role as governor.

In 2008, as the nation elected its first African American president and Hazard High School's football team competed in the state championship, the issue of coal mining and its environmental effects again created a stir. A local pro-coal group called Coal Mining Our Future formed with Perry County Clerk Haven King as its director. In 2008, Josh Byers, the publisher of the Floyd County Times, was named publisher of the Herald as well.

=== 2010–present ===
It was in 2010 that the Herald reported on the loss of three of the local community's more well-known names, including longtime Mayor Bill Gorman, who died in October 2010. Ernest Sparkman, a name now synonymous with radio broadcasting in Perry County, died in January 2010 at the age of 84, and well-known land developer Roy Campbell was murdered in his Brownsfork home in November 2010. His case remains unsolved to this day.

In 2012 Versa Capital Management merged Ohio Community Media, the Freedom papers it had acquired, Impressions Media, and Heartland Publications into a new company, Civitas Media. Civitas Media sold its Ohio papers to AIM Media Midwest in 2017. In 2017, Civitas sold The Hazard Herald to Lancaster Management.

== Sources ==
- Hazard Chapter of the Daughter of the American Revolution. Perry County, Kentucky: A History. Print.
- Hazard Herald [Hazard]. Print
- Wooton, Charlie, and Martha Quiggly. The Hazard Herald and Other Perry County Newspapers. Print.
