= Miami Valley Today =

Newspaper from Ohio, USA

- Type: Semi-weekly newspaper
- Format: Broadsheet
- Owner: HD Media
- Publisher: Ron Clausen
- Editor: Sheryl Roadcap
- Founded: 1909
- Headquarters: 1001 N. County Rd 25A, Troy, Ohio 45373, United States
- OCLC number: 17420181
- Website: miamivalleytoday.com

Miami Valley Today (formerly the Troy Daily News) is an American semi-weekly newspaper published Wednesdays and Sundays in Troy, Ohio. It is owned by HD Media.

In addition to Troy, Miami Valley Today circulates in several communities of Miami County, Ohio, including Casstown, Conover, Covington, Fletcher, Piqua, Pleasant Hill, Tipp City and West Milton. Miami Valley Today is printed in Miamisburg.

== History ==
The newspaper was founded as a daily in 1909.

In 1955, the newspaper was bought by George Kuser. He owned the paper until 1998. Kuser was an eccentric businessman who lived abroad in Africa, Italy and Turkey for much of that time. Upon his return to Troy, he sometimes lived in an apartment built atop the Daily News' newsroom. In the late 1990s, Daily News employees bought stock in the company through an innovative employee stock ownership program.

Pulitzer, Inc., of St. Louis, Missouri, bought the paper and its commercial printing operations in November 1998, intending to build a regional chain. Instead, the company sold the Daily News for an undisclosed price to Brown Publishing Company, which already owned several properties in the area.

Brown, a Cincinnati-based family business, purchased the Daily News in April 2001, integrating it with the Piqua Daily Call and Sidney Daily News as its "I-75 Group", sharing the printing plant at Tipp City. In February 2009, these three newspapers stopped printing Tuesday editions because of the weak economy, reducing the Troy paper to six publication days per week, including the Miami Valley Sunday News.

Brown Publishing filed for Chapter 11 bankruptcy protection on April 30, 2010; its Ohio assets, including 14 daily newspapers and about 30 weeklies, were transferred to a new business, Ohio Community Media, which was purchased in May 2011 by Philadelphia-based Versa Capital Management.

In 2012 Versa merged Ohio Community Media, former Freedom papers it had acquired, Impressions Media, and Heartland Publications into a new company, Civitas Media. Civitas Media sold its Ohio papers to AIM Media Midwest, a subsidiary of AIM Media Management, in 2017.

On December 5, 2018, AIM Media Midwest merged the Troy Daily News and Piqua Daily Call into a single daily newspaper, Miami Valley Today. The two former rival newspapers moved into a single newsroom in a building across the street from the Miami County Fairgrounds, roughly midway between the two cities. The merger eventually resulted in staffing cuts.

In February 2023, Miami Valley Today reduced its publishing schedule to Wednesdays and Sundays as part of cost-cutting across AIM Media Midwest.

In August 2026, the paper was sold to HD Media.

== Notable alumni ==
The Troy Daily News has produced several well-known journalists, especially photojournalists. Among the alumni are:

- Tyler Hicks, international photographer for The New York Times and winner of the 2014 Pulitzer Prize for Breaking News Photography
- Chris Hondros, war photographer for Getty Images
