= Piqua Daily Call =

American daily newspaper

Miami Valley Today
- Type: Daily newspaper
- Format: Broadsheet
- Owner: AIM Media Midwest
- Publisher: Ron Clausen
- Editor: Sheryl Roadcap
- Founded: January 1, 1884
- Ceased publication: December 2018
- Headquarters: 1001 N. County Rd. 25A; Troy, Ohio 45373, United States
- OCLC number: 17420156
- Website: miamivalleytoday.com

The Piqua Daily Call was an American daily newspaper that was consolidated with the Troy Daily News in April 2019 to form Miami Valley Today, which is published Tuesday through Friday in Troy, Ohio. Its Sunday edition is called the Miami Valley Sunday News. It is owned by AIM Media Midwest.

In addition to the city of Piqua, Miami Valley Today circulates in several other communities in Miami County, Ohio, including Troy. It is printed in nearby Miamisburg, Ohio.

== History ==
The Piqua Daily Call was founded in 1884, around the same time as the Piqua Daily Dispatch and Piqua Daily Leader. By 1922, all three newspapers had merged into the Piqua Daily Call and Piqua Press-Dispatch, which shortened its name in 1927 to the Piqua Daily Call.

In the early 21st century, the Daily Call formed part of the "I-75 Group" of Brown Publishing Company, a family-owned business based in Cincinnati. Other Brown-owned dailies along Interstate 75 north of Dayton included the Sidney Daily News and Troy Daily News. In February 2009, all three of these newspapers stopped printing Tuesday editions because of the weak economy, reducing the Daily Call to five publication days per week.

Brown Publishing filed for Chapter 11 bankruptcy protection on April 30, 2010; its Ohio assets, including 14 daily newspapers and about 30 weeklies, were transferred to a new business, Ohio Community Media, which was purchased in May 2011 by Philadelphia-based Versa Capital Management.

In 2012 Versa merged Ohio Community Media, former Freedom papers it had acquired, Impressions Media, and Heartland Publications into a new company, Civitas Media. Civitas Media sold its Ohio papers to AIM Media Midwest in 2017.
