= Durant Democrat =

Weekly newspaper in Durant, Oklahoma, serving Bryan County

The Durant Democrat
- Type: Weekly newspaper
- Format: Broadsheet
- Owner: Wesner Publications Company
- Publisher: Larry Miller
- Managing editor: Matt Swearingen
- Founded: 1901 (1910 under present name)
- Headquarters: 200 West Beech Street; Durant, Oklahoma 74701; United States
- Circulation: 7,000 Daily
- ISSN: 2996-5012
- OCLC number: 23715706
- Website: durantdemocrat.com

The Durant Democrat is a weekly newspaper located in the city of Durant, Oklahoma. The Durant Daily Democrat serves all of Bryan County and parts of other South Central Oklahoma counties. The Circulation is 7,000 Daily

== History ==
For over a century, The Durant Daily Democrat has served the people of Durant and Bryan County as their major source of news, as well as a guide for shoppers through advertising of local merchants.

It is a survivor of nearly 50 newspapers published at one time or another in what is now Bryan County. Most were born - and died - shortly before or after 1900.

The Democrat traces its heritage back to 1901, when R. H. Glenn and Lewis Paullin, already publishers of the Durant Times, bought the Durant Eagle. They changed the name to the Durant Weekly News and started the Durant Daily News.

In the spring of 1909, two young men came to Durant to enter the newspaper business: R. F. (Bob) Story of Mineral Wells, Texas, and Walter Archibald, of Marietta, Oklahoma. The following year they purchased the Durant Daily News and changed the name to the Durant Daily Democrat. The first issue under the new - and present - name was dated June 1, 1910. Their association continued through the years, ending with Archibald's death in 1940.

In 1941, Story and his son, Bennett, bought Archibald's interest.

In 1957, they sold the newspaper and the radio station they had started in 1946 to the newly formed Durant Publishing Broadcasting Co., with brothers Robert H. Peterson and Richard P. Peterson as co-publishers. Other stockholders were their parents, Robert V. Peterson, a veteran Oklahoma newspaperman and a professor of journalism at the University of Oklahoma, and his wife, Berdena.

The new corporation continued in business at 127 North Third, long familiar as the "newspaper corner" in Durant, for 10 years. In 1967, it moved to a new building, at 200 W. Beech. As the Story era had ended, so did the Peterson years with the unexpected death of Dick Peterson in May 1981.

In October of that year, the newspaper was sold to Donrey, Inc. and became part of the Fort Smith, Arkansas-based Donrey Media Group, a substantial group of daily and weekly newspapers and other media.

August 31, 1993, the Donrey Media Group was purchased as a unit of the Stephens Group, parent of Stephens Inc. of Little Rock, one of the nation's largest off-Wall Street brokerage houses. Publisher David Crouch, who joined the Democrat in 1981, served through both the Donrey and Stephens eras.

The Donrey era ended in Durant in 1998, when the Democrat became a unit of the far-flung Community Newspaper Holdings, Inc., headquartered in Birmingham, Alabama.

== Bankruptcy and Bailout 2009-2010 ==
The former owner Heartland Publications filed for Chapter 11 bankruptcy protection in 2009[4], and left bankruptcy in 2010[5] under control of its creditors. It was acquired by Versa Capital Management in 2012[6], and along with Freedom Central, Impressions Media, and Ohio Community Media, were consolidating into Civitas Media. Civitas Media sold its Oklahoma papers to Greystone Media Group in 2017.

In October 2020, the newspaper was acquired by Matt Swearengin, who sold it again in December 2023 to Wesner Publications Company.
