= The Times-Gazette =

The Times–Gazette
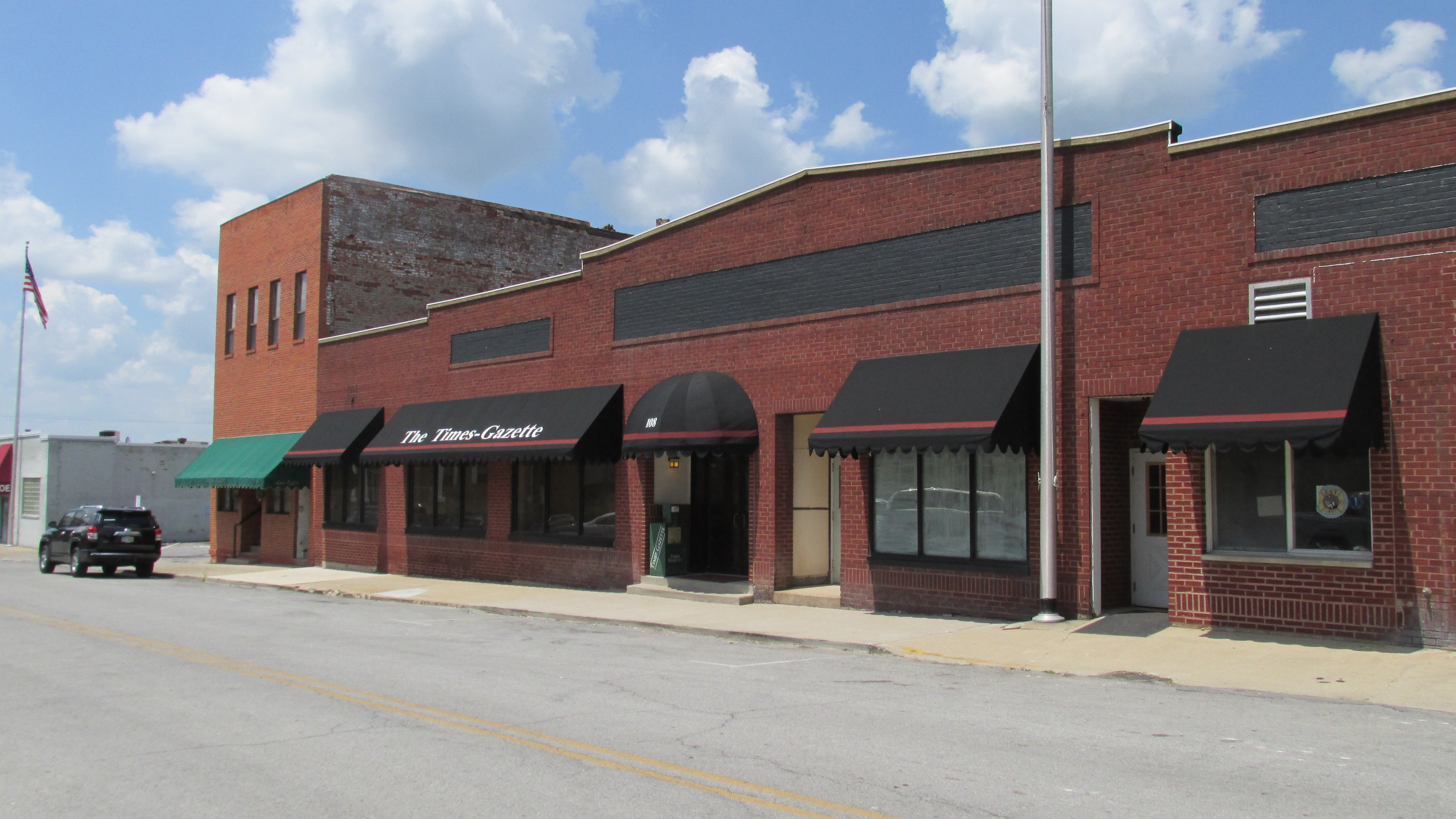
- Type: Daily newspaper
- Format: Broadsheet
- Owner: HD Media
- Publisher: Regional VP Lane Moon
- Editor: Jeff Gilliland
- Founded: June 18, 1818, as Hillsborough Gazette, and Highland Advertiser
- Headquarters: 108 Governor Trimble Place, Hillsboro, Ohio 45133 U.S.
- Website: Official website

The Times–Gazette is a daily newspaper published weekdays and Saturdays in Hillsboro, Ohio.

== History ==
Published as a daily since October 1, 1973 (when it was called the Hillsboro Press Gazette), The Times-Gazette traces its history back to a long succession of weekly newspapers covering Hillsboro and Highland County, Ohio, starting with the Hillsborough Gazette, and Highland Advertiser, in 1818.

In February 1928 the Press Gazette began circulation when The Hillsboro Gazette and The People's Press merged. On March 12, 1996 the Press Gazette, Greenfield Daily Times, Lynchburg News and Leesburg Citizen merged to form the Times-Gazette although the first newspaper with a Times-Gazette headline wasn't until November 4, 1996.

More recently, the newspaper was owned by Brown Publishing Company of Cincinnati before that company went bankrupt and was reconstituted as Ohio Community Media in 2010. The company, including the Times-Gazette, was purchased for an undisclosed sum in 2011 by Philadelphia-based Versa Capital Management.

In 2012 Versa merged Ohio Community Media, former Freedom papers it had acquired, Impressions Media, and Heartland Publications into a new company, Civitas Media. In 2017, Civitas Media sold its Ohio papers to AIM Media Midwest, an affiliate of AIM Media Texas. In August 2026, the paper was sold to HD Media.

== Notable people ==
- Gary Abernathy – editor, 1985–1991, 2011–2018; publisher, 2015–2018; nationally syndicated political commentator
