= Harlan Enterprise =

Newspaper serving Harlan, Kentucky

- Type: Weekly newspaper
- Owner: Boone Newspapers
- Publisher: Jeff Kuerzi
- Editor: Warren Taylor
- Founded: 1901
- Language: English
- ISSN: 2640-4354
- OCLC number: 1066134113
- Website: harlanenterprise.net

The Harlan Enterprise, a weekly newspaper serving Harlan County, in the U.S. state of Kentucky, with a circulation of 6,000, was first published in 1901 as The Harlan Enterprise and began publishing in 1928 as The Harlan Daily Enterprise. Now publishing on Wednesdays, it has reverted to its original name. Historically, it was a twice-weekly newspaper, on Wednesdays & Saturdays; however, it reverted to once-weekly on Wednesdays, due to complications arisen from the COVID-19 Pandemic.

The newspaper is named in honor of the city and county which it serves. Those entities were named for Silas Harlan who was killed in 1782 while leading the advance party at the Battle of Blue Licks, the last major battle of the American Revolutionary War. Harlan is a distant relative of U.S. Supreme Court Justice John Marshall Harlan.

History and demographics of Harlan County have presented both challenges and opportunities for the editorial staff of the newspaper as the coal-mining region it serves has been the site of labor disputes and a series of "boom and bust" cycles; a declining population since its highest level of 75,275 in the 1940 census down to 33,202 in the 2000 census with an estimate that the 2009 population has declined to 30,783, a 7.3% decline while the rest of Kentucky has an estimated growth of 5.6%; significant welfare rolls with an estimated 29.3% of residents living below the poverty level; and clearly divided socioeconomic classes.

== Ownership ==
The Harlan Daily Enterprise was founded in 1901. It was locally owned until 1970, when it was sold to Worrell Newspapers of Charlottesville, Virginia. The New York Times Company acquired the Enterprise and seven other dailies from Worrell Newspapers in 1982. In 1990, the Times Company sold the Enterprise and the Middlesboro Daily News to American Publishing Company, later renamed Hollinger International. In 1998, the Enterprise was part of a 45-paper sale by Hollinger to Community Newspaper Holdings. In 2004, the Enterprise was part of a 22-paper sale by CNHI to Heartland Publications. In 2012 Versa Capital Management merged Heartland, Ohio Community Media, former Freedom papers it had acquired, and Impressions Media into a new company, Civitas Media. Civitas Media sold the Enterprise and the Middlesboro Daily News to Boone Newspapers in 2017.
