= The Madison Press =

Defunct American daily newspaper

- Type: Daily newspaper
- Format: Broadsheet
- Owner: AIM Media Midwest
- Editor: Mac Cordell
- Founded: August 12, 1843, as London Sentinel
- Headquarters: 55 E. High Street; London, Ohio 43140, United States
- OCLC number: 18102266
- Website: madison-press.com

The Madison Press was an American daily newspaper that was published Mondays through Saturdays in London, Ohio. It was owned by AIM Media Midwest. After converting to digital only, it ceased publication in 2019.

== History ==
The newspaper called itself "Your window to Madison County, Ohio, since 1842", but the Library of Congress recorded its predecessor, the weekly London Sentinel, beginning a year later in 1843. The Sentinel went through several name changes (Madison Reveille, Madison Chronicle, Madison County Union, The London Times) before taking the name The Madison Press in 1917, and adopting a daily publication schedule May 4, 1961.

Later, the Press was the flagship of the Central Ohio Printing chain of newspapers, which also included the weeklies Mechanicsburg Telegram, Mount Sterling Tribune, Plain City Advocate and Weekly Review. This chain was sold to Brown Publishing Company, a family-owned business based in Cincinnati, in 2004.

Brown Publishing filed for Chapter 11 bankruptcy protection on April 30, 2010; its Ohio assets, including 14 daily newspapers and about 30 weeklies, were transferred to a new business, Ohio Community Media, which was purchased in May 2011 by Philadelphia-based Versa Capital Management.

In 2012 Versa merged Ohio Community Media, former Freedom papers it had acquired, Impressions Media, and Heartland Publications into a new company, Civitas Media. Civitas Media sold its Ohio papers to AIM Media Midwest in 2017.
