= The Mount Airy News =

Newspaper based in Mount Airy, North Carolina, U.S.

- The July 19, 2009 front page of The Mount Airy News
- Type: Daily newspaper
- Format: Broadsheet
- Owner: Adams MultiMedia
- Publisher: Sandra Hurley
- Editor: John Peters
- Founded: 1880
- Language: American English
- Headquarters: 319 N. Renfro Street; Mount Airy, North Carolina 27030
- City: Mount Airy
- Country: United States
- Circulation: 3,203 (as of 2021)
- OCLC number: 24943682
- Website: mtairynews.com

The Mount Airy News is a three-day-a-week newspaper published in Mount Airy, North Carolina, United States. It was established in 1880. The News is one of two newspapers serving Surry County, along with The Tribune in Elkin.

== History ==
The Mount Airy News and The Tribune have the same corporate parent. In June 2007, both The Mount Airy News and The Tribune were part of a sale from Mid-South Management Co., Inc. to Heartland Publications, LLC of Connecticut.

Mount Airy had two newspapers until around 1980, when the weekly Mount Airy Times was bought by the News. In 2007, the city again had two papers with The Messenger and The Mount Airy News. However, after attempting several different publication schedules, The Messenger closed less than three years later, shutting its doors in 2010.

The Mount Airy News was published seven days a week. On April 9, 2012, The News ceased publication of its Monday edition. The paper now publishes Sunday, Wednesday and Friday.

In 2012 Versa Capital Management merged Heartland Publications, Ohio Community Media, the former Freedom papers it had acquired, and Impressions Media into a new company, Civitas Media. Civitas Media sold its properties in the Carolinas to Champion Media in 2017. Later in 2017, Champion Media sold its Mount Airy area newspapers to Adams Publishing Group.

== See also ==
- List of newspapers in North Carolina
