= Altus Times =

Newspaper in Altus, Oklahoma

- Type: Biweekly newspaper
- Format: Broadsheet
- Owner: Graystone Media Group
- Publisher: Rick Carpenter
- Managing editor: Rick Carpenter
- Staff writers: Katrina Goforth, Ryan Lewis
- Founded: 1900
- Language: English
- Headquarters: Altus, Oklahoma
- Circulation: 5,000
- Website: altustimes.com

The Altus Times is a twice-a-week newspaper based in Altus, Oklahoma and owned by Graystone Media Group. It is published Wednesday and Saturday.

== History ==
The original Altus Times was founded as a weekly newspaper by J. Ed Van Meter in December, 1901. It was consolidated with two other newspapers into the Weekly Altus Times-Democrat around 1916. It began daily publication in 1928. The newspaper was renamed the Altus Times on August 1, 1984.

The paper was previously owned by Heartland Publications. In 2012 Versa Capital Management merged Heartland, Ohio Community Media, former Freedom papers it had acquired, and Impressions Media into a new company, Civitas Media. Civitas Media sold its Oklahoma papers to Greystone Media Group in 2017.
