= Ashe Post & Times =

Newspaper in West Jefferson, North Carolina

Coordinates: 36°24′10.3″N 81°29′43.5″W

- Type: Biweekly newspaper
- Owner: Adams MultiMedia
- Publisher: Ron Clausen
- Editor: Adam Orr
- Founded: 1925
- Language: English
- Headquarters: 203 South Second Avenue, West Jefferson, North Carolina United States
- Circulation: 3,057 (as of 2021)
- OCLC number: 244898941
- Website: jeffersonpost.com

The Ashe Post & Times is a bi-weekly newspaper printed in West Jefferson, North Carolina. It prints news, announcements, and obituaries as the newspaper of record for Ashe County. The newspaper formed after The Jefferson Post and Ashe Mountain Times merged in 2017. The newspaper is owned by Adams Publishing Group.

== History ==
The Jefferson Post began publishing in 1988. The newspaper is the result of a merger between Ashe County's historic weekly newspaper The Skyland Post and a competing weekly of 10 years, the Jefferson Times.

The Skyland Post got its name from an early slogan for mountainous Ashe County, "The Land of the Sky." The Skyland Post was purchased in the 1930s by Ed M. Anderson, whose newspaper empire included The Alleghany News in Sparta, the Spindale Sun in Spindale, the Transylvania Times in Transylvania County, North Carolina, and the Courier in Forest City. Stella W. Anderson was editor of The Skyland Post from her husband's death until the early-1980s when it was purchased by Patty Wheeler, and her husband, Al.

In October 1988, The Skyland Post merged with the Jefferson Times, which had been competing with the Post since August 1978.

The paper was formerly owned by Mid-South Management Company, which was acquired by Heartland Publications in 2007. In 2012, Versa Capital Management merged Heartland Publications, Ohio Community Media, the former Freedom papers it had acquired, and Impressions Media into a new company, Civitas Media. Civitas Media sold its properties in the Carolinas to Champion Media in 2017. Later in 2017, Champion Media sold its Mount Airy area newspapers to Adams Publishing Group. The newspaper is now called The Ashe Post & Times after The Jefferson Post and Ashe Mountain Times merged on December 1, 2017.
