= Galion Inquirer =

American newspaper

- Type: Twice weekly
- Format: Broadsheet
- Owner: AIM Media Midwest
- Publisher: Vicki Taylor
- Editor: Rachel Mendell
- Founded: c. 1890
- Headquarters: 129 Harding Way East, Galion, Ohio 44833, United States
- Circulation: 3,000 (as of 2005)
- OCLC number: 16619599
- Website: galioninquirer.com

The Galion Inquirer is an American newspaper published in Galion, Ohio. It is owned by AIM Media Midwest.

In addition to Galion, the newspaper circulates in Crestline and Iberia. Ohio Community Newspapers also owns several weekly newspapers in nearby communities, including the Bellville Star of Bellville, Knox County Citizen of Fredericktown and the Morrow County Sentinel & Independent of Mount Gilead.

The Inquirer and its sister weeklies were owned by Hirt Publishing of Bellevue, Ohio, until August 2005, when they were purchased by Brown Publishing Company.

Brown, a Cincinnati-based family business, declared bankruptcy and was reconstituted as Ohio Community Media in 2010. The company, including the Inquirer, was purchased for an undisclosed sum in 2011 by Philadelphia-based Versa Capital Management.

In 2012 Versa merged Ohio Community Media, the former Freedom papers it had acquired, Impressions Media, and Heartland Publications into a new company, Civitas Media. Civitas Media sold its Ohio papers to AIM Media Midwest in 2017.
