= Urbana Daily Citizen =

American daily newspaper

- Type: Daily newspaper
- Format: Broadsheet
- Owner: HD Media
- Founded: 1838
- Headquarters: 1637 East U.S. Highway 36, Suite 5, Urbana, Ohio 43078, United States
- OCLC number: 17246812
- Website: urbanacitizen.com

The Urbana Daily Citizen is an American daily newspaper published in Urbana, Ohio. It is owned by HD Media.

== History ==
The newspaper was part of the Brown Publishing Company chain that filed for Chapter 11 bankruptcy protection on April 30, 2010; its Ohio assets, including 14 daily newspapers and about 30 weeklies, were transferred to a new business, Ohio Community Media, which was purchased in May 2011 by Philadelphia-based Versa Capital Management.

In 2012, Versa merged Ohio Community Media, former Freedom papers it had acquired, Impressions Media, and Heartland Publications into a new company, Civitas Media. In 2017, Civitas Media sold its Ohio papers to AIM Media Midwest, an affiliate of AIM Media Texas. In August 2026, the paper was sold to HD Media.
