= The Daily Advocate =

Newspaper in Greenville, Ohio

- Type: Daily newspaper
- Format: Broadsheet
- Owner: HD Media
- Publisher: Ron Clausen
- Editor: Ryan Berry
- Founded: May 3, 1883, as Darke County Democratic Advocate
- Headquarters: 100 Washington Ave, Greenville, Ohio 45331, United States
- Website: dailyadvocate.com

The Daily Advocate is an American daily newspaper published Tuesday through Friday in Greenville, Ohio. The Advocate is the leading newspaper of Darke County, Ohio, circulating in Greenville, Ansonia, Arcanum, Bradford, New Madison, Union City and Versailles, Ohio, as well as abutting smaller communities, and neighboring Union City, Indiana.

== History ==
The Advocate was founded by W.A. Browne, Sr. as an eight-page weekly newspaper in May 1883. Browne converted it to daily publication around January 1893, as the Daily Advocate.

Browne sold the paper to The Thomson Corporation, a Canadian publisher, which later sold it to Brown Publishing Company in 1996.

Brown, a Cincinnati-based family business, declared bankruptcy and was reconstituted as Ohio Community Media in 2010. The company, including the Daily Advocate, was purchased for an undisclosed sum in 2011 by Philadelphia-based Versa Capital Management.

In 2012 Versa merged Ohio Community Media, the former Freedom papers it had acquired, Impressions Media, and Heartland Publications into a new company, Civitas Media. Civitas Media sold its Ohio papers to AIM Media Midwest in 2017. In 2019, AIM Media Midwest purchased the Greenville Earlybird, a Sunday only free-distribution newspaper in the area. The consolidation of the two publications now offers its advertising customers publishing capabilities Tuesdays through Fridays and Sundays each week.

In August 2026, the paper was sold to HD Media.
