= Record Herald =

Newspaper in Washington Court House, Ohio

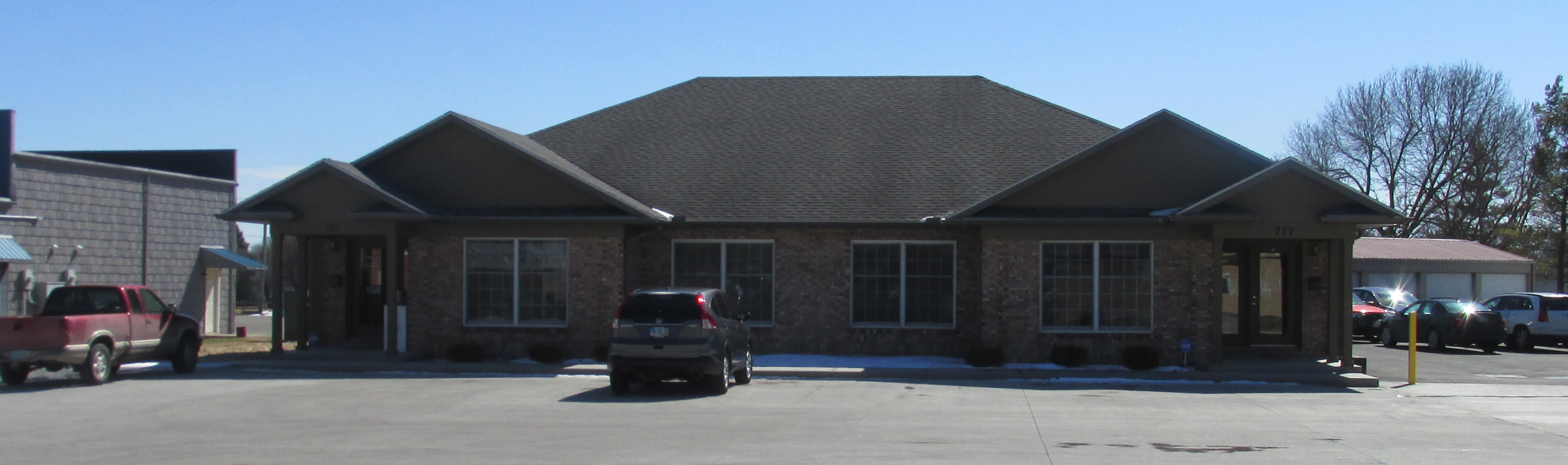
- Offices of the Record Herald
- Type: Daily newspaper
- Format: Broadsheet
- Owner: HD Media
- Editor: Ryan Carter
- Founded: December 11, 1858, as Washington Herald
- Headquarters: 757 W. Elm St., Washington Court House, Ohio 43160, United States
- Circulation: 5,143 daily in 2011
- Website: recordherald.com

The Record Herald, earlier known as Washington C.H. Record-Herald is an American daily newspaper published weekdays and Saturdays in Washington Court House, Ohio. It is owned by HD Media.

== History ==
Founded as a weekly in 1858, the Herald has published daily since at least 1916. Two dailies, The Record-Republican and the Washington C.H. Herald, merged in 1937 to form the current newspaper, which was known as the Washington C.H. Record-Herald before dropping the city name and the hyphen in 1972.

The newspaper was owned by Cincinnati's Brown Publishing Company before that company went bankrupt and was reconstituted as Ohio Community Media in 2010. The company, including the Record Herald, was purchased for an undisclosed sum in 2011 by Philadelphia-based Versa Capital Management.

In 2012, Versa merged Ohio Community Media, former Freedom papers it had acquired, Impressions Media, and Heartland Publications into a new company, Civitas Media. Civitas Media sold its Ohio papers to AIM Media Midwest in 2017. In August 2026, the paper was sold to HD Media.
