= News Journal (Ohio) =

American newspaper and multimedia site

- Type: Daily newspaper
- Format: Broadsheet
- Owner: HD Media
- Publisher: Lane Moon
- Editor: Ryan Carter
- Founded: October 1838, as the Western Whig
- Headquarters: 1547 Rombach Ave. Avenue, Wilmington, Ohio 45177, United States
- ISSN: 8750-4847
- Website: wnewsj.com

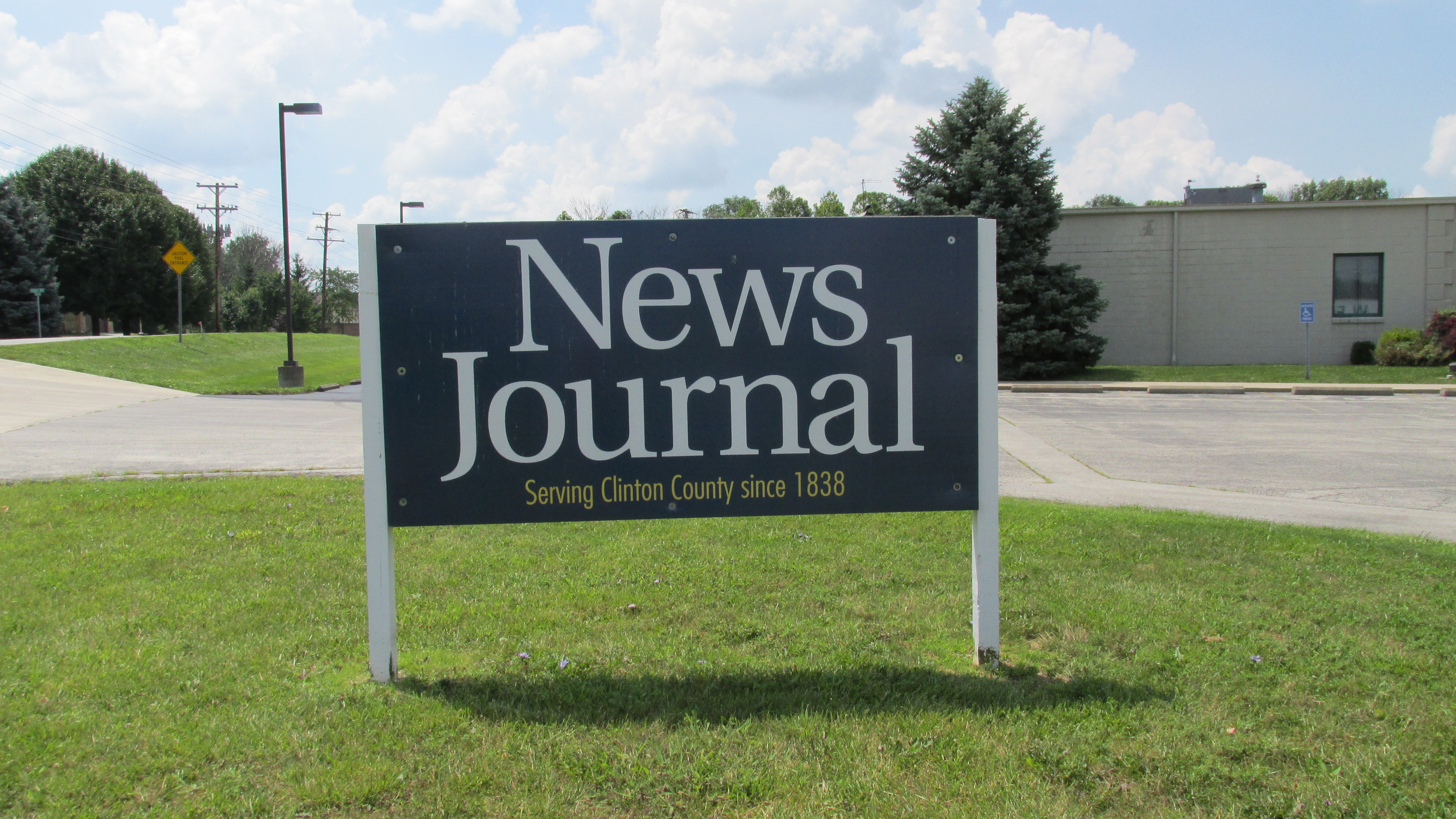
News Journal sign

The News Journal is an American newspaper published in print two days per week (Wednesday and Saturday) in Wilmington, Ohio, covering Clinton County.

== History ==
The newspaper traces its history back to two weeklies, the Clinton Republican (begun in 1838 as the Western Whig, the name changed the next year), and The Wilmington Journal (founded 1868), that merged into The Journal-Republican in 1912. The Wilmington News Journal was founded by W. J. Galvin on Oct. 15, 1915, originally called the Wilmington Daily News.

In 1916, it merged with the semi-weekly Journal Republican and became known as the Wilmington Daily News Journal. It was owned by the Galvin family until it was sold to the Brown Publishing Company in 1986. In 2010, Brown declared bankruptcy and was reconstituted as Ohio Community Media, which later became part of Civitas/Versa. The company, including the News Journal, was purchased for an undisclosed sum in 2011 by Versa Capital Management.

In 2012, Versa merged Ohio Community Media, former Freedom papers it had acquired, Impressions Media, and Heartland Publications into a new company, Civitas Media. In 2017, Civitas Media sold its Ohio papers to AIM Media Midwest, an affiliate of AIM Media Texas.

Shortly after a website redesign in early 2023, the News Journal announced on February 21, 2023 that the printed edition, previously published Tuesday through Saturday, would publish only on Wednesday and Saturday. In August 2026, the paper was sold to HD Media.
