= The Delaware Gazette =

- Type: Daily newspaper
- Owner: HD Media
- Editor: Joshua Keeran
- Founded: October 1, 1818, as the Delaware Gazette, and Religious Informer
- Headquarters: 40 North Sandusky Street, Suite 203, Delaware, Ohio 43015, United States
- Circulation: 8,000 (as of 2004)
- ISSN: 1064-2013
- Website: delgazette.com

The Delaware Gazette is an American daily newspaper published in Delaware, Ohio. It is owned by HD Media.

The newspaper is published on weekday and Saturday mornings and is the only daily newspaper in Delaware County, Ohio. The paper's circulation in 2004 was approximately 8,000 daily.

In addition to the daily newspaper, the Gazette newsroom also publishes The Sunbury News, a weekly newspaper in nearby Sunbury, Ohio, and provides commercial printing and website management services.

== History ==
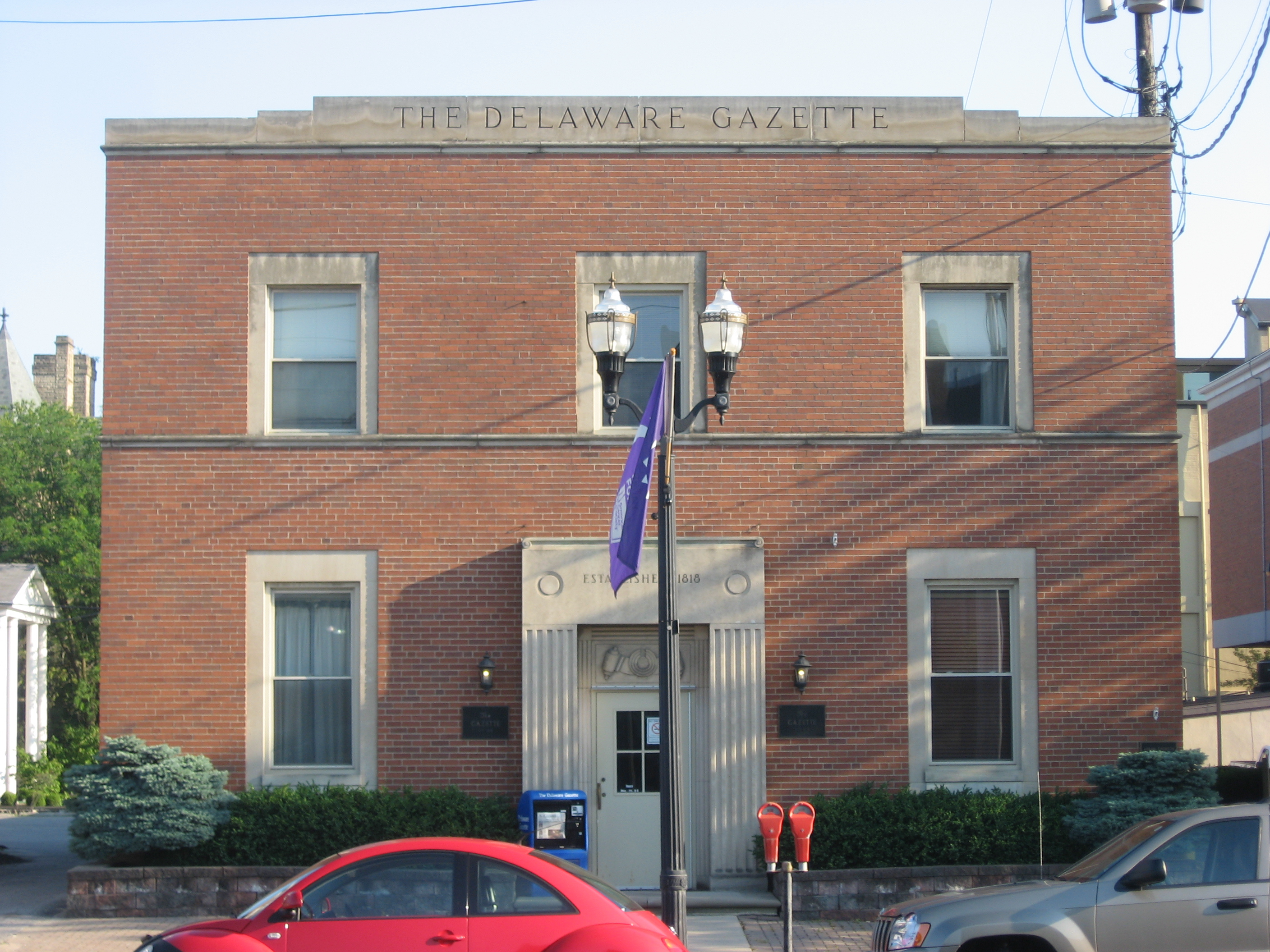
Former offices of The Gazette in Delaware, Ohio

The Delaware Gazette was founded as a weekly newspaper in 1818, by Abram Thomson and a partner. In 1834, Thomson bought out his partner and from that time until 2004, the newspaper was owned and managed by members of the Thomson family. The Gazette published its first edition as a daily newspaper January 10, 1884.

In June 2004, W.D. "Tom" Thomson II, the great-great-grandson of Abram Thomson, sold the Gazette to Brown Publishing Company of Cincinnati. At the time of its sale, the newspaper had been owned by a single family longer than any other newspaper in America.

At the time, Thomson family members said they had not been under pressure to sell the newspaper, and chose to sell it to Brown because it, too, was a longstanding family-owned business:

"We had a hell of a ride," said Gazette vice president Chip Thomson. "I'm at peace."

Brown declared bankruptcy and was reconstituted as Ohio Community Media in 2010. The company, including the Gazette, was purchased for an undisclosed sum in 2011 by Philadelphia-based Versa Capital Management. In 2012 Versa merged Ohio Community Media, former Freedom papers it had acquired, Impressions Media, and Heartland Publications into a new company, Civitas Media. Civitas Media sold its Ohio papers to AIM Media Midwest in 2017. In August 2026, the paper was sold to HD Media.
