= The Bellevue Gazette =

- Type: Biweekly newspaper
- Format: Broadsheet
- Owner: Civitas Media
- Editor: Amber Hatten
- Founded: 1851, as Bellevue Gazette, and Huron, Seneca, Erie and Sandusky Advertiser
- Ceased publication: June 1, 2016
- Headquarters: 212 W. Main Street, Bellevue, Ohio 44811, United States
- Circulation: 2,460 daily in 2007
- OCLC number: 11035646
- Website: thebellevuegazette.com

The Bellevue Gazette was an American bi-weekly newspaper published Wednesdays and Saturdays in Bellevue, Ohio from 1851 to 2016. It was owned by Civitas Media, a subsidiary of Versa Capital Management.

== History ==
First appearing as a short-lived weekly newspaper in 1851, The Bellevue Gazette was published continuously since being refounded in October 1867, and daily since 1899, originally as The Bellevue Record, then The Evening Gazette, before adopting the name Bellevue Gazette in 1906.

For more than a century, The Bellevue Gazette was the flagship of The Gazette Publishing Company, a chain that also included eight weeklies across Northwestern Ohio. The company, owned by the Callaghan family, was sold to Brown Publishing Company of Cincinnati in 2007.

Brown declared bankruptcy and was reconstituted as Ohio Community Media in 2010. The company, including The Bellevue Gazette, was purchased for an undisclosed sum in 2011 by Philadelphia-based Versa Capital Management.

On June 1, 2016, the Bellevue Gazette published its final addition after Civitas Media announced both the Bellevue paper and the Clyde Enterprise would be shuttered.
