= The Tribune (Elkin, North Carolina) =

Newspaper in North Carolina, U.S.

- Type: Weekly newspaper (Published Wednesday afternoons)
- Format: Broadsheet
- Owner: Adams MultiMedia
- Publisher: Sandy Hurley
- Editor: Bill Colvard
- Founded: 1911
- Headquarters: 214 East Main Street; Elkin, North Carolina 28621; United States
- Circulation: 690 (as of 2021)
- Website: elkintribune.com

The Tribune is a weekly newspaper published in Elkin, North Carolina. It has covered the tri-county area of Surry, Wilkes, and Yadkin counties since 1911.

== History ==
Harvey Laffoon (1897-1978) was the owner, publisher and editor of The Elkin Tribune for 42 years, beginning in 1926. He was inducted into the North Carolina Journalism Hall of Fame in 2002. In 1949, the paper expanded from a weekly to bi-weekly.

After Laffoon retired in 1968, the newspaper was sold to Mid-South Management Company Inc. Thomas Fleming succeeded Laffoon as publisher. Soon after the paper was sold, it was expanded to three times weekly. Further, Elkin was dropped from the masthead, and it became known as The Tribune. In 1970 Rebel Good became editor at the age of 21 and, in 1978, after Fleming experienced health problems, became publisher. He served as editor and publisher for 37 years.

Mid-South Management was sold to Heartland Publications in 2007. In 2012, Versa Capital Management merged Heartland Publications, Ohio Community Media, the former Freedom papers it had acquired, and Impressions Media into a new company, Civitas Media. Civitas Media sold its properties in the Carolinas to Champion Media in 2017. Later in 2017, Champion Media sold its Mount Airy area newspapers to Adams Publishing Group.

On June 5, 2019, The Tribune and regional publisher Sandy Hurley announced that Bill Colvard had been named the new editor, replacing Wendy Wood.

== Affiliated publication ==
The Tribune also publishes On the Vine, a quarterly magazine that focuses on Yadkin Valley and North Carolina wine.
