= Three Little Fish and the Big Bad Shark =

Picture Book by Ken Geist and Will Grace, illustrated by Julian Gorton

- Three Little Fish and the Big Bad Shark cover
- Author: Ken Geist
- Illustrator: Julia Gorton
- Language: English
- Genre: Children's picture book, parody, folklore
- Publication date: 2007
- Media type: Print (hardcover)
- ISBN: 978-0-439-71962-9
- OCLC: 123175001
- Dewey Decimal: 813.6
- LC Class: PZ7.G2728

Three Little Fish and the Big Bad Shark is a children's picture book written by Ken Geist, illustrated by Julia Gorton, and first published by Heinemann in 2007. The American edition was published by Scholastic in New York. The story is a comically aquatic version of the classic fable "The Three Little Pigs".

== Plot summary ==
Mother fish sends her children to move to their homes. The first little fish named Jim builds a house of seaweed, the second little fish named Tim builds a house of sand, and the third little fish named Kim is an owner of a sunken old ship. A great white shark munches the seaweed house, after which the Jim goes to the Tim's house, but the shark subsequently munches on the sand house. Both escape from the shark and run to their sister's house. When the shark tries to bite the old sunken ship, all of the shark's teeth fall out and the three little fishes start to feel more safe and happy.

== Reception ==
In a positive review for School Library Journal, librarian Jayne Damron wrote, "Gorton's whimsical, computer-drawn scenery and electric color palette set just the right tone for Geist's tongue-in-cheek retelling. The bold font is humorously integrated with the art, appearing inside the shark's mouth for emphasis, or swirling along the current with an escaping fish. This spunky tale is a welcome addition to storytime and picture-book collections." Library Media Connection agreed, writing, "What makes this an effective version of the familiar tale is the bright colors, large depictions of the characters, and dynamic text that changes and moves with the story and its emphasis."

Publishers Weekly had a favourable review of both the writing and illustrations, stating, "Geist stays true to the plot of the original text but makes this story his own with the addition of clever rhymes ('Not by the skin of my finny fin fin') and inventive puns ('We fish stick together'). Gorton's digitally rendered underwater world is jam-packed with sea life in vivid blues and greens and creates a dynamic setting that bustles with activity and movement." Citing the same puns as well as the appearance of sand, seaweed, and a shipwreck, The Lima News said "this book is sure to be a favorite read-aloud for fans of sea creatures". Jackie Braun wrote in The Flint Journal, "Julia Gorton's illustrations are as fresh and fun as this amusing, updated tale", while Merry von Seggern said, "Be sure to include the fractured fairy tale ... for a few giggles and smiles."

In a review for YA Books Central, Michelle Lynn said, "It's a lot of fun with colorful images and lines that make kids giggle as they say them. Kids will love this. It couldn't quite hold the attention of the two-year-old I read it with, but she was almost there. The small, compact style of the book makes it super easy for little hands to hold and flip through because at that age they want to start doing everything themselves."
