= Sidney Daily News =

American daily newspaper published in Sidney, Ohio

- The December 15, 2010 front page of the Sidney Daily News
- Type: Daily newspaper
- Format: Broadsheet
- Owner: HD Media
- Publisher: Ron Clausen
- Editor: Bryant Billing
- Founded: January 1, 1891
- Headquarters: 1451 North Vandemark Road; Sidney, Ohio 45365-4099, United States
- OCLC number: 9806283
- Website: SidneyDailyNews.com

The Sidney Daily News is an American daily newspaper published two days a week (Wednesday and Saturday) in Sidney, Ohio. It is owned by HD Media.

== History ==
The newspaper's history as a daily dates back to 1891, but its former sister weekly newspaper, the Shelby County Democrat, first began publishing January 1, 1849, in Sidney (as the Shelby Democrat).

The Democrat was purchased in 1876 by General James Oliver Amos, and became the first newspaper published by Amos Publishing. The Amos family began the Daily News in 1891 and published both papers until June 28, 1940, when the Democrat folded. The family sold its interest in the Sidney Daily News in 1999.

After exiting the newspaper business, Amos Publishing continued to operate, still headquartered in Sidney, as the publisher of several magazines dedicated to hobbies such as coin collecting and automobile restoration.

In 2000, Brown Publishing Company took control of the Sidney Daily News, integrating it with several other titles produced at its Tipp City, Ohio, presses as the "I-75 Group".

In February 2009, the Daily News and two other Brown papers stopped printing Tuesday editions because of the weak economy. Brown Publishing filed for Chapter 11 bankruptcy protection on April 30, 2010; its Ohio assets, including 14 daily newspapers and about 30 weeklies, were transferred to a new business, Ohio Community Media, which was purchased in May 2011 by Philadelphia-based Versa Capital Management.

In 2012 Versa merged Ohio Community Media, former Freedom papers it had acquired, Impressions Media, and Heartland Publications into a new company, Civitas Media.

Civitas Media sold its Ohio papers to AIM Media Midwest in 2017.

On March 1, 2023, AIM Media Midwest reduced the publishing frequency of the Sidney Daily News and its other Ohio publications to twice per week. The Sidney Daily News publishes on Wednesdays and Fridays.

Bryant Billing took over as the publication's editor in April 2024.

In August 2026, the paper was sold to HD Media.
