= Mid-South Management Company =

Publisher in South Carolina, USA

Mid-South Management Inc.
- Company type: Family-owned
- Industry: Media
- Founded: 1948
- Defunct: 2007
- Fate: Assets acquired by Heartland Publications
- Headquarters: Spartanburg, South Carolina
- Key people: Phyllis B. DeLapp, chairman; Andrew M. Babb, president
- Products: Newspapers
- Website: midsouthmanagement.com

Mid-South Management Company Inc. was a family-owned, Spartanburg, South Carolina-based publisher of small to medium market newspapers in North Carolina, South Carolina, Virginia and Georgia. The company was started in 1948 by Phil Buchheit, who was then publisher and operator of the Spartanburg Herald-Journal.

== Daily newspapers ==
- The LaGrange Daily News, LaGrange, Georgia
- The Mount Airy News, Mount Airy, North Carolina
- The Laurinburg Exchange, Laurinburg, North Carolina
- The Union Daily Times, Union, South Carolina

== Non-dailies ==
- The Newberry Observer, Newberry, South Carolina
- The Pickens Sentinel, Pickens, South Carolina
- Easley Progress, Easley, South Carolina
- The Stokes News, Stokes County, North Carolina
- The Jefferson Post, West Jefferson, North Carolina
- Rural Hall Weekly Independent, Rural Hall, North Carolina
- The Tribune, Elkin, North Carolina
- The Yadkin Ripple, Yadkinville, North Carolina
- The Pilot, Pilot Mountain, North Carolina
- The Carroll News, Carroll County, Virginia
- The Thomaston Times, Thomaston, Georgia

== Recent changes ==
In 2005, Mid-South sold the Williamson Daily News, Williamson, West Virginia, and two affiliated weeklies to Heartland Publications.

In 2006, The Phenix Citizen, Phenix City, Alabama, was sold to Family Media Inc.

In June 2007, the remainder of the assets were sold to Heartland Publications, LLC, a Connecticut based publisher.
