= Journal-Courier =

Newspaper in Jacksonville, Illinois, U.S.

Jacksonville Journal-Courier
- Type: Daily newspaper
- Format: Broadsheet
- Owner: Hearst Communications
- Publisher: David C.L. Bauer
- Editor: David C.L. Bauer
- Founded: April 24, 1830; 196 years ago
- Headquarters: 235 West State Street, Jacksonville, Illinois 62650, United States
- Circulation: 10,975 Daily; 11,274 Sunday (as of 2012)
- OCLC number: 24396370
- Website: myjournalcourier.com

The Jacksonville Journal-Courier is an American daily newspaper published in Jacksonville, Illinois. It is owned by Hearst Newspapers since being sold in August 2017 by Civitas Media, a subsidiary of Versa Capital Management.

== History ==
With a history dating back to 1830, the Jacksonville Journal-Courier is the "oldest continuously published newspaper in Illinois".

In addition to Jacksonville and South Jacksonville, the Jacksonville Journal-Courier circulates in Cass, Greene, Macoupin, Morgan, Brown, Pike and Scott counties, in western Central Illinois.

The Jacksonville Journal-Courier has been owned by Hearst Newspapers since 2017. Hearst also owns the Illinois newspapers The Telegraph, in nearby Alton, Illinois and the Intelligencer in Edwardsville. The Jacksonville and Alton newspapers, along with The Lima News in Ohio and The Sedalia Democrat in Sedalia, Missouri, constituted the Central Division of Freedom Communications before being sold to Ohio Community Media (later Civitas Media) in May 2012. Freedom acquired the paper from Thomson in 1995.
