= Wilmington News Journal =

Wilmington News Journal may refer to:

- News Journal (Ohio), a newspaper based in Wilmington, Ohio
- The News Journal, a newspaper serving Wilmington, Delaware
