= Madison County Airport (Ohio) =

Public use airport in London, Ohio

- IATA: none; ICAO: KUYF; FAA LID: UYF

Summary
- Airport type: Public
- Owner: Madison County Airport Authority
- Location: London, Ohio
- Time zone: UTC−05:00 (-5)
  - Summer (DST): UTC−04:00 (-4)
- Elevation AMSL: 1,081 ft (329 m)
- Coordinates: 39°55′58″N 083°27′43″W
- Website: https://www.co.madison.oh.us/departments/madison_county_airport/index.php

Map
- Location of airport in Ohio UYF (the United States)

Runways
Direction	Length		Surface
Direction	ft	m	Surface
9/27	4,001	1,220	Asphalt

Statistics (2023)
- Aircraft operations: 41,410
- Source: Federal Aviation Administration

Madison County Airport (ICAO: KUYF, FAA LID: UYF) (Note: The airport formerly used the FAA location identifier I48.) is a public airport located 3 miles (4.8 km) north of the central business district of London, a city in Madison County, Ohio, United States. It is owned by the Madison County Airport Authority.

Although most U.S. airports use the same three-letter location identifier for the FAA and IATA, Madison County Airport is assigned UYF by the FAA but has no designation from the IATA.

== History ==
The airport opened in the late 1960s when Governor Jim Rhodes mandated every county in Ohio should have an airport. An additional approximately 13 acres (5.3 ha) were purchased in mid February 1967. The airport was dedicated on 1 October 1967 with $100,000 in matching funds from the state government.

The airport celebrated its 50-year anniversary in September 2017 with aircraft displays, BBQ, a visit from a senator, and free airplane rides for children.

A hangar at the airport was destroyed in a tornado on 28 February 2024.

== Facilities and aircraft ==
Madison County Airport covers an area of 148 acres (60 ha) which contains one runway designated 9/27 with a 4,000 ft × 75 ft (1,219 m × 23 m) asphalt pavement.

The airport has a fixed-base operator that sells fuel and offers amenities such as catering, courtesy transportation, rental cars, a conference room, and more.

For the 12-month period ending June 28, 2023, the airport had 41,410 aircraft operations, an average of 113 per day: 95% general aviation, 5% military and <1% air taxi. For the same time period, 41 aircraft were based at the airport: 36 single-engine and 4 multi-engine airplanes as well as 1 helicopter.

== Accidents and incidents ==
- On June 20, 2007, a Luscombe 8A struck a sign after landing at the Madison County Airport. The pilot reported he struck the runway before fully correcting for the crosswind present at the time, and the airplane turned to the right. The pilot subsequently overcorrected, and the plane ground looped. The aircraft departed off the right side of the runway and struck a taxiway sign. The probable cause of the accident was found to be the pilot's failure to maintain directional control of the airplane and the pilot's inadequate compensation for the crosswind, which resulted in a ground loop and subsequent collision with a taxiway sign.
- On October 19, 2009, a Cessna 170 was damaged during takeoff from the Madison County Airport. During the takeoff roll, a wind gust caused the pilot to lose control and veer off the runway. Though the airplane temporarily went airborne, the pilot reduced engine power to idle, and the landing gear struck a hole and collapsed. The probable cause of the accident was found to be the pilot's failure to maintain directional control during the takeoff roll.
- On September 17, 2017, a Cessna 177 Cardinal performed a forced landing in a soybean field while on approach to the Madison County Airport. The student and instructor on board performed a flight to the Lima Allen County Airport and were returning to Madison when the plane's engine sputtered several times and stopped producing power. The instructor on board attempted to troubleshoot the problem and noticed the fuel pressure was low and fluctuating. Though the engine momentarily produced power, it shut off again when the instructor turned on the fuel boost pump. The instructor subsequently landed in a field. The probable cause of the accident was found to be the flight instructor's inadequate in-flight fuel management, which resulted in a total loss of engine power due to fuel exhaustion.
- On September 18, 2019, a Beechcraft Bonanza aircraft crashed while on approach to the Madison County Airport. Investigators found that the pilot did not have a valid medical certificate at the time of the crash. A dash camera from a passing car showed the aircraft turning from left base to final approach and descending to the ground. The aircraft was found configured with 20° of flaps and the landing gear extended.
- On March 17, 2022, a paraglider crashed while operating at the Madison County Airport. The sole occupant survived with injuries.
- On April 18, 2023, two people were killed when a 1977 Cessna 172N (N734GB) crashed just short of Runway 9/27. One of the people on board was a student pilot who was interested in aviation and learning to fly as a hobby.

== See also ==
- List of airports in Ohio
