= Gary Abernathy =

American political commentator and columnist

Highland County Commissioner
- In office July 2, 2018 – October 2, 2020 Serving with: Jeff Duncan; Terry Britton
- Preceded by: Shane Wilkin
- Succeeded by: David T. Daniels

Personal details
- Born: 1956 (age 69–70)
- Party: Republican
- Spouse: Lora Abernathy
- Education: Lynchburg-Clay High School
- Occupation: Journalist; political commentator
- Website: garyabernathymedia.com

Gary Abernathy (born 1956) is an American political commentator who writes a nationally syndicated column for The Washington Post and makes frequent appearances on the PBS NewsHour. A former newspaper editor and state Republican Party official, he is noted for his politically conservative views from a rural perspective.

== Early life and education ==
Abernathy grew up on a farm in Hamer Township, Highland County, Ohio (between Fairview and Danville). He graduated from Lynchburg-Clay High School in 1974.

== Career ==
Abernathy began his career as a reporter at the Hillsboro Press Gazette (now The Times-Gazette). He became the city editor there in 1983, then the editor in 1985. In 1991, he left the Press Gazette to serve as city editor of The Marion Star. In 1993, he moved to the Portsmouth Daily Times, where he served as managing editor until 1996.

In January 1998, Abernathy became the Ohio Republican Party's communications director. In October 2001, Abernathy was appointed as the West Virginia Republican Party's executive director. He was dismissed in 2004 after alleging that the party's chairman, Kris Warner, had overspent on his brother Monty's gubernatorial campaign. He returned as executive director in 2008. Through his Dayton-based consultancy, Abernathy Strategies, he also served as an advisor to John McCain, West Virginia State Senator Russ Weeks, and Senate candidate John Raese. He has also worked for U.S. Senators George Voinovich and Rob Portman and an Ohio congressman.

In 2011, Abernathy was named publisher of the Times-Gazette and Highland County Shopper. In 2015, he became the papers' publisher and editor. He led the Times-Gazette in giving Donald Trump a rare newspaper endorsement in the 2016 presidential election, which was unremarkable among the paper's Highland County readers but attracted international attention. In 2017, The Washington Post added Abernathy as a contributing columnist to diversify its editorial pages with a conservative viewpoint from outside the Beltway. He began writing two to three columns a month, which the Washington Post Writers Group distributes to hundreds of newspapers across the U.S. He also began making appearances on the PBS NewsHour as a political analyst, substituting for David Brooks.

On July 2, 2018, the Highland County Republican Central Committee appointed Abernathy to replace Shane Wilkin on the Board of County Commissioners. Abernathy resigned as publisher and editor of the Times-Gazette to serve as a commissioner. He was confirmed in a general election later that year. He resigned on October 2, 2020, to move to the Cincinnati area.

On January 30, 2026, Abernathy expressed support for the tactics used by Department of Homeland Security forces in Minneapolis and compared the actions of Renee Good and Alex Pretti to those of the protestors at the US Capitol on January 6, 2021.

== Personal life ==
Abernathy lives in Loveland, Ohio, with his wife, Lora. Abernathy has four children.

Abernathy was a member of the Hillsboro Rotary Club for 10 years until 2020.

Several years ago, Abernathy occasionally performed with a band as an Elvis tribute artist, sometimes at political functions. He became a fan after watching the Elvis Comeback Special in 1968.
