= Lynchburg-Clay High School =

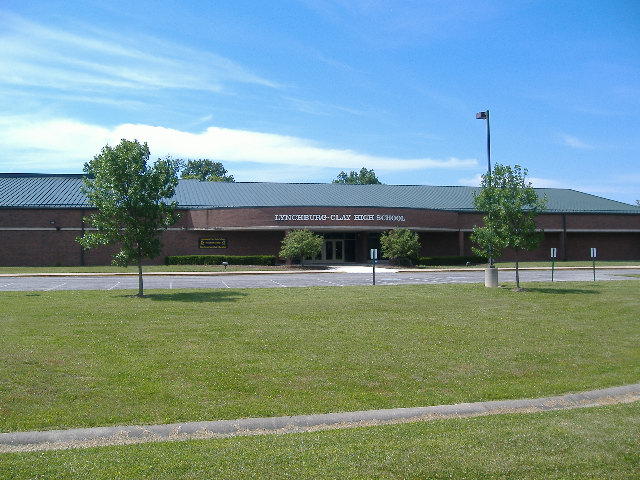

Location
- 6762 State Route 134 South; Lynchburg, (Highland County), Ohio 45142; United States; 39°11′36″N 83°48′37″W

Information
- Type: Public, Coeducational high school
- School district: Lynchburg-Clay Local School District
- NCES District ID: 3904763
- Superintendent: Ron Sexton
- NCES School ID: 390476302933
- Principal: Jacob Zink
- Teaching staff: 23.50 (FTE)
- Grades: 9-12
- Student to teacher ratio: 11.87
- Colors: Black, gold and white
- Athletics conference: Southern Hills Athletic League
- Team name: Mustangs
- Athletic Director: Mark Faust
- Website: https://hs.lclsd.org/

Lynchburg-Clay High School is a public high school in Lynchburg, Ohio. It is the only high school in the Lynchburg-Clay Local School District.

== Athletics ==
The school mascot is the Mustang. They offer baseball, basketball, bowling, softball, soccer, track and field, volleyball, golf and cross country. They are a member of the Ohio High School Athletic Association and the Southern Hills Athletic League.

== Notable alumni ==
- Gary Abernathy – newspaper editor, Republican party official, and nationally syndicated political columnist
- Rob Preston – professional basketball player
- Peyton Scott – current women's NCAA Division 1 basketball player
