= The Telegraph (Alton, Illinois) =

American daily newspaper

- Type: Daily newspaper
- Format: Broadsheet
- Owner(s): Hearst Communications
- Publisher: Denise VonderHaar
- Founded: 1836 (as the Alton Telegraph)
- Language: English
- Headquarters: 219 Piasa St. Alton, Illinois 62002, U.S.
- Circulation: 19,554 daily
- ISSN: 0897-456X
- Website: thetelegraph.com

The Telegraph is an American daily newspaper published seven days a week in Alton, Illinois, serving the St. Louis Metro-East region. It was owned by Civitas Media, based in Davidson, North Carolina, a subsidiary of Philadelphia-based Versa Capital Management, which owned about 100 daily and weekly newspapers across 12 states but sold The Telegraph to Hearst Corp. in 2017.

== History ==
It was founded in 1836, as the Alton Telegraph by Lawson A. Parks. It is published seven days a week. Until the 1970s, the Telegraph was known as the Alton Daily Telegraph and then the Alton Evening Telegraph.

In 1969 the Alton Telegraph was sued for defamation by a local builder, James C. Green. A jury awarded $9 million. The newspaper could not appeal unless it posted a $10 million bond, and instead declared bankruptcy, eventually settling for slightly more than its insurance limits.

The Cousley family controlled the paper from 1889 to 1985, when they sold the paper to Ingersoll Publications, who had acquired the Suburban Journals the previous year. When Ingersoll successor Journal Register exited the St. Louis market, The Telegraph was sold to Freedom Communications.

Along with The Telegraph, Civitas Media also owned the Journal-Courier in Jacksonville, Illinois, which was sold to Hearst at the same time as the Telegraph, and the Sedalia Democrat in Missouri. These three newspapers, along with The Lima News in Ohio, constituted the Central Division of Freedom Communications before being sold to Ohio Community Media in May 2012 before becoming part of Civitas Media.

News publishing corporation Hearst Media Company acquired The Telegraph in August 2017.

In December 2017, The Telegraph moved its offices from 111 East Broadway, after 90 years at that location, to 219 Piasa St. in Alton. "Our current building was great as a manufacturing facility, but as the newspaper business has evolved and technology has improved, staffing is now office-based and we need a more modern space to operate the business", former Telegraph Publisher Jim Shrader said.
