= The Thomaston Times =

Newspaper in Thomaston, Georgia

- Type: Newspaper
- Owner: Civitas Media
- Publisher: Rick Thomason
- Founded: 1869
- Ceased publication: 2015
- Language: English
- Headquarters: Thomaston, Georgia
- Circulation: 4500
- Website: thomastontimes.com

The Thomaston Times was a Thomaston, Georgia, United States, based newspaper. The newspaper operated for more than 145 years, and was the oldest active business in Thomaston. It ceased operations on December 29, 2015.
