= Floyd County Chronicle & Times =

American newspaper

- Type: Twice-weekly newspaper
- Owner: Lancaster Management
- Publisher: Jeff Vanderbeck
- Managing editor: Russ Cassidy
- Founded: 2017
- Language: English
- Headquarters: Prestonsburg, Kentucky, U.S.
- Website: floydct.com

The Floyd County Chronicle & Times is a bi-weekly newspaper based in Prestonsburg, Kentucky covering Floyd County, Kentucky.

The paper was formed in 2017 when Lancaster Management, owner of the weekly Floyd County Chronicle, purchased the twice-weekly Floyd County Times (established in 1927) from Civitas Media and merged the two papers. It is published on Wednesday and Friday.
