= Times Leader =

Broadsheet published in Wilkes-Barre

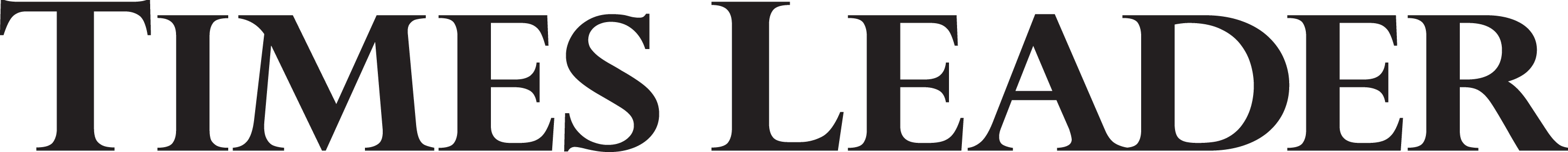
- Type: Daily newspaper
- Format: Broadsheet
- Owner: Avant Publications
- Editor: Joe Soprano
- Founded: 1879; 147 years ago
- Language: English
- Headquarters: 90 E. Market St. Wilkes-Barre, Pennsylvania 18701; United States
- ISSN: 0199-0519
- Website: timesleader.com

The Times Leader is a privately owned newspaper in Wilkes-Barre, Pennsylvania.

== Founding ==
Founded in 1879, it was locally owned until being purchased by Capital Cities in 1978.

== Early history ==
On November 27, 1907, the Wilkes-Barre Times printed a notice that it and the Wilkes-Barre Leader, both afternoon dailies, would merge into The Times Leader. The first edition of the merged paper rolled off the presses on December 2, 1907.

The Times Leader, in the heart of coal country, was subject to a very bitter strike that began October 6, 1978. Over 200 union employees walked off the job in defiance of what they viewed as union busting tactics by the Times Leader's new corporate owner, Capital Cities. The four striking newspaper unions began to publish the Citizens' Voice as a strike paper.

Eventually the four unions were decertified. The Voice continued publication. This in turn prompted competition and created the unusual environment where Wilkes-Barre, with its population of a little more than 43,000, now has two competing dailies. The Times Leader was steadily returned to its position of prominence as the leading daily in Luzerne County, both in editorial quality and paid circulation. After the strike began, Capital Cities persuaded a young, dynamic editor, Richard L. Connor, to become publisher. During his eight years running the newspaper, Connor and his staff dominated the state's newspapers with awards for writing, reporting, and photography. The paper also became among the most prominent corporate citizens.

The Times Leader became known around the US as a growth platform for young journalists, photographers, and newspaper executives. Connor moved on to restore the Fort Worth Star Telegram to strength as the Texas economy faltered in the mid-80s. His successor as publisher, Dale A. Duncan, became publisher of the Pontiac, Michigan, Oakland Press, and then publisher of The Indianapolis Star. Duncan was followed by Mark Contreas who worked in several executive capacities with the Pulitzer Company before become head of the newspaper division for Scripps.

Capital Cities and the Times Leader were purchased by The Walt Disney Company in 1996. Disney in turn sold the Times Leader to Knight Ridder in 1997.

The newspaper continued to prosper under Knight Ridder ownership. It started publishing a half-dozen zoned weekly sections for different parts of metro Wilkes-Barre, affectionately called the "Baby Leaders." It also actively battled the Hazleton Standard-Speaker in southern Luzerne County with a heavily staffed bureau and daily zoned metro section.

== Recent history ==
The McClatchy Company acquired 32 Knight Ridder newspapers, including the Times-Leader, in March 2006. However, McClatchy quickly announced that it would resell a number of papers, including the Times Leader.

On June 26, 2006, McClatchy announced its sale of the Times Leader to Connor and investors including Frank Henry, Charles Parente, and HM Capital Partners, a Texas equity fund that seeks "investment opportunities in middle-market, cash generative businesses that have strong competitive positions with significant value creation opportunities." A handful of unidentified local business owners also acquired ownership stakes.

In 2007, to celebrate its 100-year anniversary, the Times Leader engaged in a circulation-building initiative in which it agreed to donate some proceeds to local charities. The newspaper staff was recognized for its editorial quality with several awards that year, both in the state Associated Press competition and at the Keystone Press Awards. The Times Leader has gone on to win more Keystone Press Awards than any daily newspaper in the Wyoming Valley area.

The Wilkes-Barre Publishing Company—parent to the Times Leader— purchased a Spanish-language newspaper, El Mensajero, in late 2007. It was the dominant Spanish-language newspaper in Northeastern Pennsylvania. El Mensajero folded in August 2011.

The Times Leader grew its paid circulation by 1,500 daily subscribers and 1,300 Sunday subscribers for the first four months of 2008, again outpacing the industry. For the six months ending September 30, 2011, the Audit Bureau of Circulations put the Times Leader's average daily paid circulation at 38,059 (M-S) and 59,273 (Sunday).

In 2011, the Wilkes-Barre Publishing Company reorganized into Impressions Media, with a strong focus on digital media. The company soon won a W3 Award for efforts in mobile media technology.

Later that year, publisher Richard L. Connor stepped down as publisher of the Times Leader, but remained an investor.

In 2012, Impressions Media was acquired by the private equity firm Versa Capital Management. Versa later merged its newspaper holdings into Civitas Media.

In 2019, Civitas Media sold the Times Leader to Avant Publications, a joint venture of Champion Media and MIDTC. In 2021, long time employee Kerry Miscavage was named Times Leader Media Group Publisher.
