= The Lima News =

Newspaper published in Lima, Ohio

- Type: Daily newspaper
- Format: Broadsheet
- Owner: HD Media
- Publisher: Kirk Dougal
- Editor: Jim Krumel
- Founded: July 21, 1926
- Language: English
- Headquarters: Lima, Ohio
- Website: www.limaohio.com

The Lima News is a local daily newspaper aimed at residents in Allen, Auglaize, Hancock, Hardin, Logan, Mercer, Putnam, Shelby and Van Wert counties in Ohio, USA. Its headquarters is located in Lima, Ohio.

== History ==
The newspaper was first printed on July 21, 1926. The paper was owned by Freedom Communications, a privately held California-based company, until 2012, when it was sold to Ohio Community Media, an affiliate of the private equity firm Versa Capital Management.

In 2012, Versa merged Ohio Community Media, the Freedom papers it had acquired, Impressions Media and Heartland Publications into a new company, Civitas Media. Civitas Media sold its Ohio papers to AIM Media Midwest in 2017. In August 2026, the paper was sold to HD Media.
