= London, Ohio =

- City
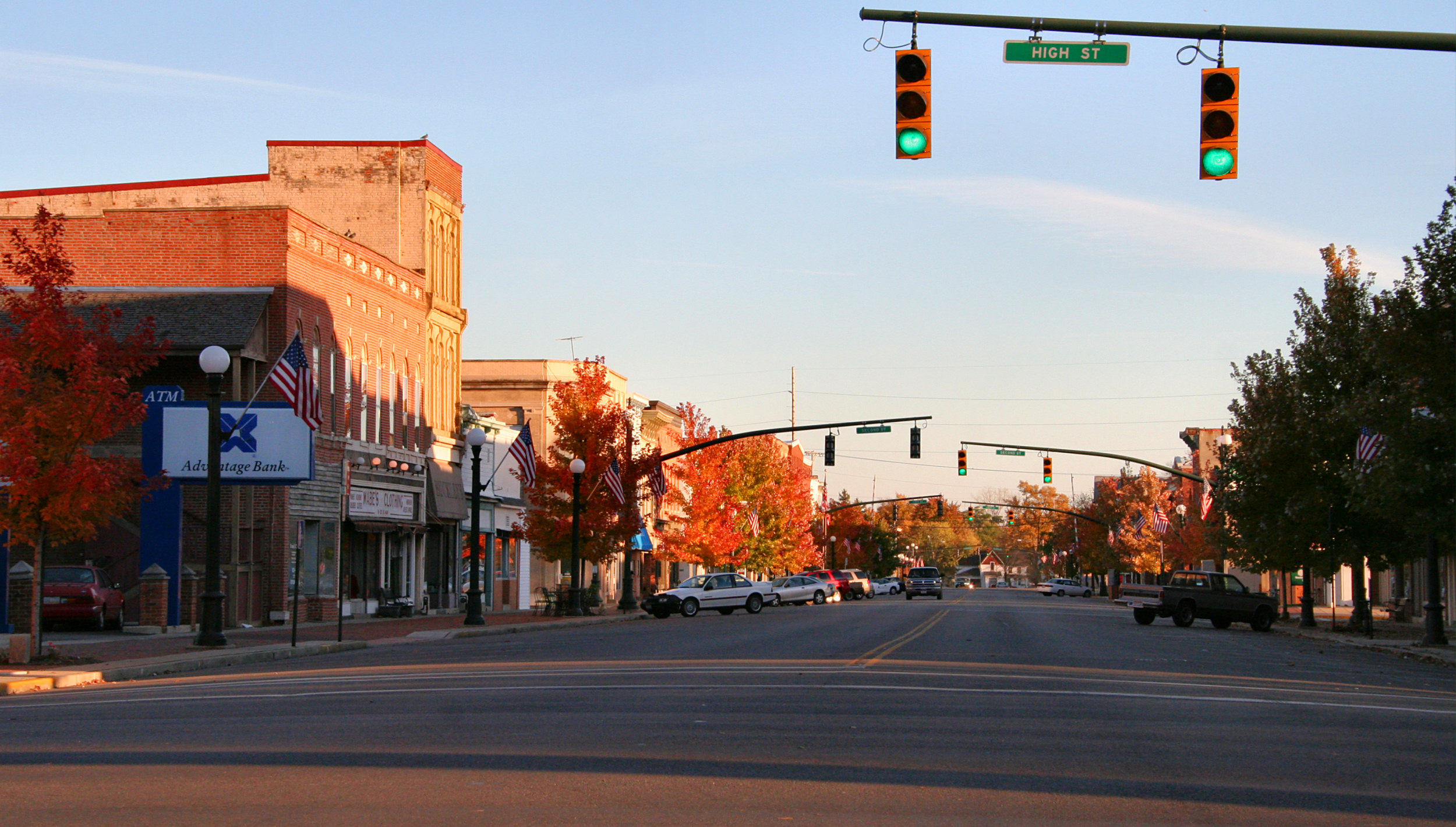
- Main Street downtown
- Motto(s): A proud heritage, a promising future
- Interactive map of London, Ohio
- Location within Ohio Location within the United States
- Coordinates: 39°53′15″N 83°26′32″W
- Country: United States
- State: Ohio
- County: Madison

Government
  - Type: Mayor-council
  - Mayor: Patrick J. Closser

Area
  - Total: 8.41 sq mi (21.77 km^{2})
  - Land: 8.40 sq mi (21.75 km^{2})
  - Water: 0.012 sq mi (0.03 km^{2})
- Elevation: 1,047 ft (319 m)

Population (2020)
  - Total: 10,279
  - Density: 1,224.2/sq mi (472.65/km^{2})
- Time zone: UTC−5 (Eastern (EST))
  - Summer (DST): UTC−4 (EDT)
- ZIP code: 43140
- Area code: 740
- FIPS code: 39-44674
- GNIS feature ID: 1086545
- Website: City website

London is a city in and the county seat of Madison County, Ohio, United States. Located about 25 miles (40 km) southwest of the Ohio capital of Columbus, London was established in 1811 to serve as the county seat. The population was 10,279 at the 2020 census. It is part of the Columbus metropolitan area.

== History ==
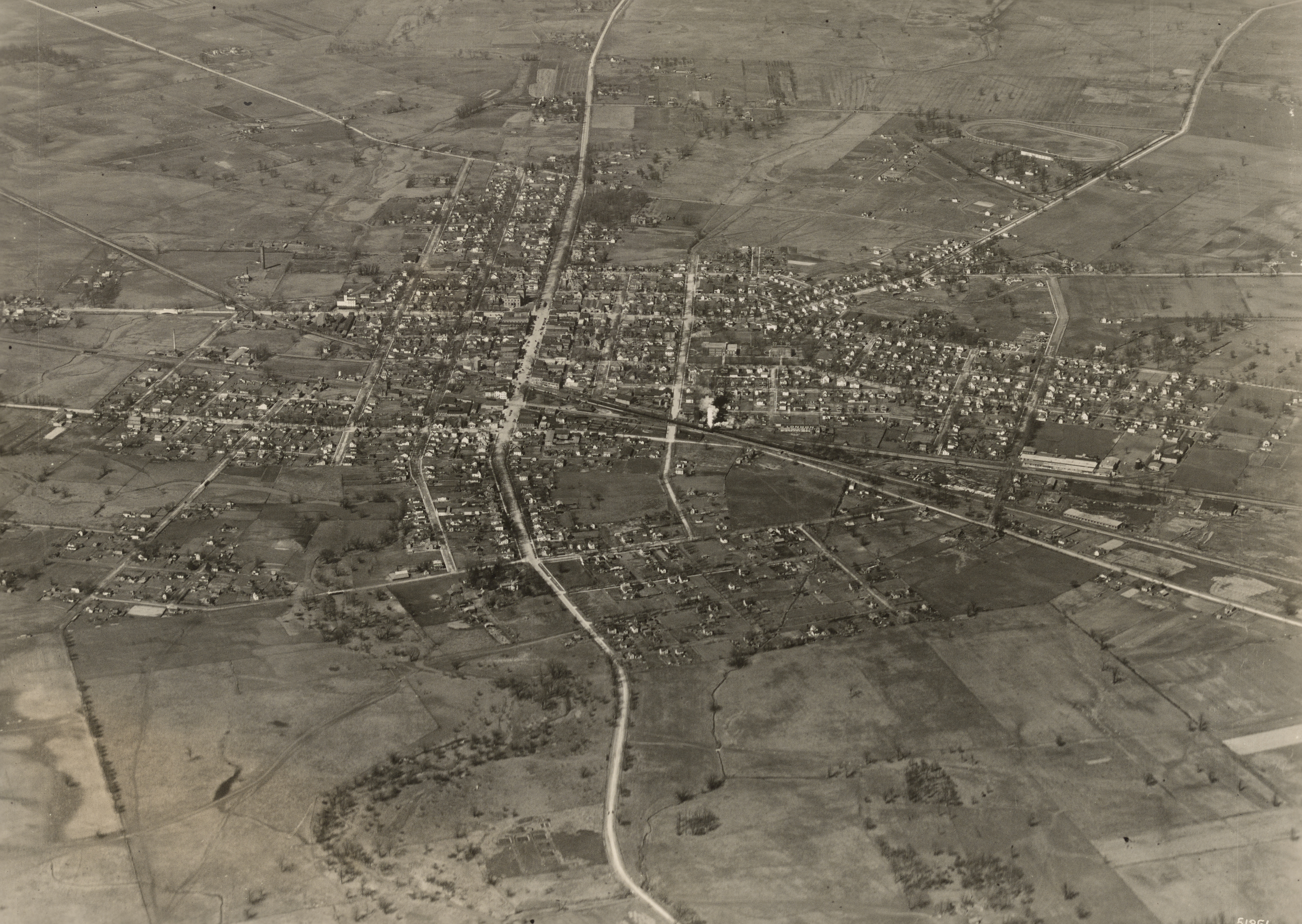
Aerial view of London in the 1930s

In 1811, driven by a need to create a county seat, Patrick McLene established London . Soon after, a Methodist church was founded in the community. Today known as First United Methodist Church, this congregation built a small log church building in 1820; it was London's first church. In the early 1900s, the church added facilities for the storage of human milk to sustain the orphanage it then operated.

== Geography ==
According to the United States Census Bureau, the city has a total area of 8.45 square miles (21.89 km^{2}), all land.

=== Climate ===
Climate data for London Fish Hatchery, Ohio (1991–2020 normals, extremes 1918–2004, 2010–present)
| Month | Jan | Feb | Mar | Apr | May | Jun | Jul | Aug | Sep | Oct | Nov | Dec | Year |
|---|---|---|---|---|---|---|---|---|---|---|---|---|---|
| Record high °F (°C) | 72 (22) | 74 (23) | 83 (28) | 89 (32) | 93 (34) | 102 (39) | 109 (43) | 102 (39) | 102 (39) | 92 (33) | 80 (27) | 74 (23) | 109 (43) |
| Mean maximum °F (°C) | 57.5 (14.2) | 62.4 (16.9) | 71.2 (21.8) | 78.8 (26.0) | 86.6 (30.3) | 91.2 (32.9) | 92.0 (33.3) | 90.4 (32.4) | 90.2 (32.3) | 81.9 (27.7) | 69.3 (20.7) | 60.8 (16.0) | 93.1 (33.9) |
| Mean daily maximum °F (°C) | 33.2 (0.7) | 36.7 (2.6) | 47.7 (8.7) | 61.1 (16.2) | 71.3 (21.8) | 79.3 (26.3) | 82.2 (27.9) | 80.9 (27.2) | 75.7 (24.3) | 64.0 (17.8) | 49.8 (9.9) | 38.5 (3.6) | 60.0 (15.6) |
| Daily mean °F (°C) | 25.9 (−3.4) | 28.6 (−1.9) | 38.1 (3.4) | 49.8 (9.9) | 60.5 (15.8) | 69.5 (20.8) | 72.4 (22.4) | 70.7 (21.5) | 64.2 (17.9) | 52.5 (11.4) | 40.8 (4.9) | 31.3 (−0.4) | 50.4 (10.2) |
| Mean daily minimum °F (°C) | 18.6 (−7.4) | 20.6 (−6.3) | 28.5 (−1.9) | 38.5 (3.6) | 49.8 (9.9) | 59.6 (15.3) | 62.6 (17.0) | 60.5 (15.8) | 52.8 (11.6) | 41.1 (5.1) | 31.8 (−0.1) | 24.0 (−4.4) | 40.7 (4.8) |
| Mean minimum °F (°C) | −4.1 (−20.1) | 2.7 (−16.3) | 11.3 (−11.5) | 23.1 (−4.9) | 35.7 (2.1) | 46.1 (7.8) | 52.4 (11.3) | 49.7 (9.8) | 38.4 (3.6) | 28.0 (−2.2) | 16.5 (−8.6) | 7.6 (−13.6) | −6.4 (−21.3) |
| Record low °F (°C) | −24 (−31) | −19 (−28) | −14 (−26) | 12 (−11) | 23 (−5) | 35 (2) | 42 (6) | 37 (3) | 28 (−2) | 15 (−9) | −1 (−18) | −18 (−28) | −24 (−31) |
| Average precipitation inches (mm) | 3.12 (79) | 2.28 (58) | 3.70 (94) | 4.05 (103) | 4.67 (119) | 4.71 (120) | 4.96 (126) | 2.87 (73) | 2.91 (74) | 2.83 (72) | 2.96 (75) | 3.22 (82) | 42.28 (1,074) |
| Average precipitation days (≥ 0.01 in) | 9.8 | 7.6 | 9.3 | 11.0 | 10.6 | 9.8 | 9.6 | 6.8 | 6.8 | 7.4 | 7.8 | 8.3 | 104.8 |
Source: NOAA

== Demographics ==
Historical population
| Census | Pop. | Note | %± |
|---|---|---|---|
| 1820 | 132 | | — |
| 1830 | 250 | | 89.4% |
| 1840 | 297 | | 18.8% |
| 1850 | 513 | | 72.7% |
| 1860 | 1,152 | | 124.6% |
| 1870 | 2,066 | | 79.3% |
| 1880 | 3,067 | | 48.5% |
| 1890 | 3,313 | | 8.0% |
| 1900 | 3,511 | | 6.0% |
| 1910 | 3,530 | | 0.5% |
| 1920 | 4,080 | | 15.6% |
| 1930 | 4,141 | | 1.5% |
| 1940 | 4,697 | | 13.4% |
| 1950 | 5,222 | | 11.2% |
| 1960 | 6,379 | | 22.2% |
| 1970 | 6,481 | | 1.6% |
| 1980 | 6,958 | | 7.4% |
| 1990 | 7,807 | | 12.2% |
| 2000 | 8,771 | | 12.3% |
| 2010 | 9,904 | | 12.9% |
| 2020 | 10,279 | | 3.8% |

=== 2020 census ===
As of the 2020 census, London had a population of 10,279. The median age was 39.2 years. 23.8% of residents were under the age of 18 and 17.9% of residents were 65 years of age or older. For every 100 females there were 92.9 males, and for every 100 females age 18 and over there were 89.8 males.

97.1% of residents lived in urban areas, while 2.9% lived in rural areas.

There were 4,049 households in London, of which 31.0% had children under the age of 18 living in them. Of all households, 39.8% were married-couple households, 19.0% were households with a male householder and no spouse or partner present, and 31.5% were households with a female householder and no spouse or partner present. About 30.9% of all households were made up of individuals and 14.2% had someone living alone who was 65 years of age or older.

There were 4,390 housing units, of which 7.8% were vacant. The homeowner vacancy rate was 1.9% and the rental vacancy rate was 4.7%.

Racial composition as of the 2020 census
| Race | Number | Percent |
|---|---|---|
| White | 8,775 | 85.4% |
| Black or African American | 568 | 5.5% |
| American Indian and Alaska Native | 10 | 0.1% |
| Asian | 128 | 1.2% |
| Native Hawaiian and Other Pacific Islander | 3 | 0.0% |
| Some other race | 138 | 1.3% |
| Two or more races | 657 | 6.4% |
| Hispanic or Latino (of any race) | 294 | 2.9% |

=== 2010 census ===
At the 2010 census London had 9,904 residents, comprising 3,991 households and 2,511 families. The population density was 1,172.1 inhabitants per square mile (452.6/km^{2}). There were 4,410 housing units at an average density of 521.9 per square mile (201.5/km^{2}). The racial makeup of the city was 89.2% White, 6.0% African American, 0.3% Native American, 1.0% Asian, 0.6% from other races, and 2.9% from two or more races. Hispanic or Latino residents of any race were 1.7%.

There were 3,991 households, 32.8% of which had children under the age of 18. 41.2% of households were married couples living together; 16.2% had a female householder with no husband present; 5.4% had a male householder with no wife present; and 37.1% were non-families. 30.8% of households were made up of individuals, and 13.5% were one person aged 65 or older. The average household size was 2.43, and the average family size was 3.00.

The median age was 37.1 years. 25.6% of residents were under the age of 18; 8.5% were between the ages of 18 and 24; 26.7% were from 25 to 44; 24.6% were from 45 to 64; and 14.6% were 65 or older. The gender makeup of the city was 46.9% male and 53.1% female.

=== 2000 census ===
At the 2000 census there were 8,771 people in 3,590 households, including 2,301 families, in the city. The population density was 1,031.0 people per square mile (398.1 people/km^{2}). There were 3,848 housing units at an average density of 452.3 per square mile (174.6/km^{2}). The racial makeup of the city was 89.96% White, 6.78% African American, 0.30% Native American, 0.42% Asian, 0.02% Pacific Islander, 0.42% from other races, and 2.10% from two or more races. Hispanic or Latino of any race were 0.71%.

Of the 3,590 households 32.0% had children under the age of 18 living with them, 46.4% were married couples living together, 13.6% had a female householder with no husband present, and 35.9% were non-families. 30.8% of households were one person and 13.8% were one person aged 65 or older. The average household size was 2.40 and the average family size was 3.00.

The age distribution was 26.6% under the age of 18, 8.2% from 18 to 24, 28.8% from 25 to 44, 20.3% from 45 to 64, and 16.0% 65 or older. The median age was 36 years. For every 100 females, there were 87.1 males. For every 100 females age 18 and over, there were 83.2 males.

The median household income was $35,641 and the median family income was $42,400. Males had a median income of $33,092 versus $26,048 for females. The per capita income for the city was $18,404. About 9.5% of families and 11.7% of the population were below the poverty line, including 16.3% of those under age 18 and 11.7% of those age 65 or over.

== Education ==
London is primarily served by the London City School District. Graduating class sizes are usually between 100 and 150 students. The district partners with other local educational programs, including the Tolles Technical Center.

There is also a private school run by St. Patrick Church serving preschool through 8th grade.

London is served by the London Public Library. In 2005, the library loaned more than 194,000 items to its 14,000 cardholders. As of 2005, total holdings were over 48,000 volumes with over 145 periodical subscriptions.

== Media ==
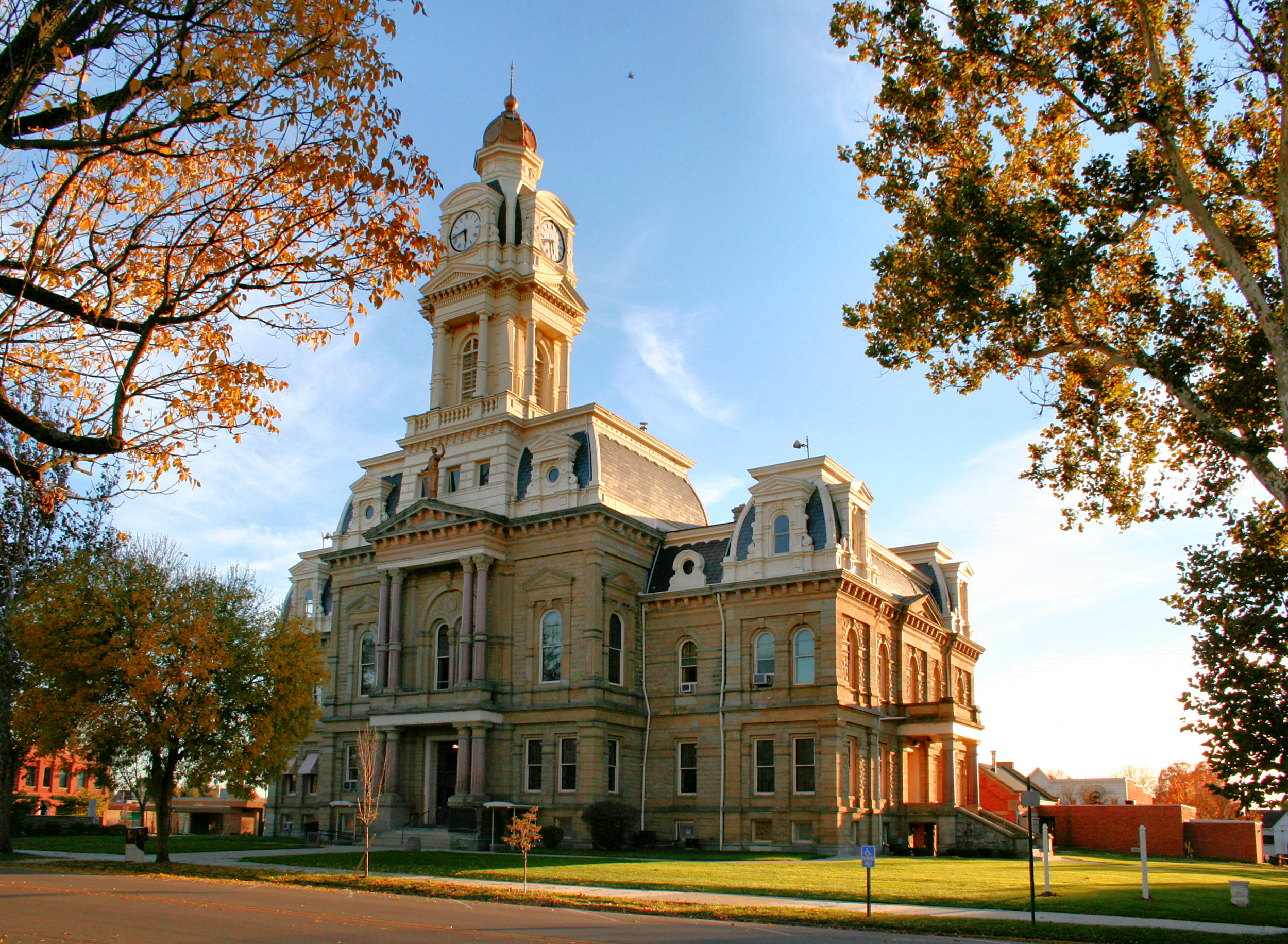
Madison County courthouse

London and Madison County were served by a daily newspaper, The Madison Press, until it folded in early 2019. The county's weekly newspaper, The Madison Messenger, is also headquartered in London.

There is a local Country radio station, ReadyFM (WCYC-LP, 105.1 FM), operating out of the city's old armory, just across from St. Patrick Church.

== Infrastructure ==
=== Transportation ===
The Madison County Airport is located three nautical miles (3.5 mi; 5.6 km) north of London's central business district.

== In popular culture ==
The London water tower, fire department, and London High School were featured in a Nike commercial promoting the 2012 Summer Olympics.

== Notable people ==
- Warren Amling, All-American Ohio State football player, and 1945 Heisman Trophy finalist
- Bob Bescher, professional baseball player
- Satch Davidson, major league baseball umpire
- Richard A. Harrison, U.S. Representative from Ohio
- Dick LeBeau, Pro Football Hall of Fame cornerback, NFL assistant head coach and defensive coordinator
- Chick McGee, radio personality on the Bob and Tom show
- Agnes Thomas Morris, Shakespeare promoter, president of War Mothers of America
- Rick Renick, professional baseball player and coach
- Jeriah Swetland, Ohio state representative
- Clyde Tingley, former governor of New Mexico

== See also ==
- Ohio to Erie Trail
