= Ohio Community Media =

Privately owned American newspaper publisher

- Type: Private
- Industry: Newspapers
- Founded: September 3, 2010
- Fate: Merged into Civitas Media
- Headquarters: 4500 Lyons Road, Miamisburg, Ohio 45342, United States
- Area served: Illinois, Missouri, Ohio
- Key people: Scott T. Champion, CEO
- Parent: Versa Capital Management
- Website: www.ohcommedia.com

Ohio Community Media was an American privately owned publisher of daily and weekly newspapers, primarily in the state of Ohio. It was headquartered in the Dayton suburb of Miamisburg, Ohio, and was owned by Philadelphia-based Versa Capital Management.

== History ==
Most of the company's holdings comprise the Ohio core of Brown Publishing Company, a family-owned publisher based in Cincinnati that declared bankruptcy in April 2010. In September of that year, Brown's 14 Ohio dailies and about 50 weekly publications were transferred to Ohio Community Media, a new entity owned by Brown's creditors, in a transaction valued at $21.75 million.

Over the next few months, the new company sold a "mini-empire" of business newsweeklies that Brown had assembled starting in 2007, unloading titles in such far-flung cities as Charleston, South Carolina; Cheyenne, Wyoming; Fort Worth, Texas; and Naperville, Illinois.

Versa completed its purchase of Ohio Community Media for an undisclosed price in May 2011. By this point, the chain consisted of 14 daily newspapers and about 30 weeklies, all in Ohio.

In February 2012, Versa purchased Impressions Media, owner of Times Leader in Wilkes-Barre, Pennsylvania, and in May of that year it bought four Midwestern dailies formerly owned by Freedom Communications. That purchase included The Lima News in Ohio, as well as dailies in Illinois and Missouri. The four dailies acquired from Freedom were integrated into Ohio Community Media.

In 2012 Versa merged Ohio Community Media, the former Freedom papers, Impressions Media, and Heartland Publications into a new company, Civitas Media.

== Holdings ==
Ohio Community Media published 18 daily newspapers and about 30 weeklies (paid and free), in addition to several free weekly shopper publications. The Beavercreek News-Current, now a weekly, was formerly a daily publication.

=== Illinois ===
- Journal-Courier of Jacksonville
- The Telegraph of Alton

=== Missouri ===
- Sedalia Democrat of Sedalia
- Whiteman Warrior (weekly) of Whiteman Air Force Base

=== Ohio ===
Central Ohio (Columbus area)

- The Delaware Gazette of Delaware
- The Madison Press of London
- Record Herald of Washington Court House
- Urbana Daily Citizen of Urbana
- Weekly newspapers:
  - Mechanicsburg Telegram of Mechanicsburg
  - Plain City Advocate of Plain City
  - Sunbury News of Sunbury
  - The Tribune of Mount Sterling
  - Indian Lake Current of Russells Point and Lakeview.
  - River Current of Degraff, Quincy and West Liberty.

Mid-Ohio (Mansfield area)

- Galion Inquirer of Galion
- Weekly newspapers:
  - Bellville Star of Bellville
  - Knox County Citizen of Fredericktown
  - Morrow County Sentinel of Mount Gilead

Northwest Ohio

- The Bellevue Gazette of Bellevue
- Lake Erie Division weeklies:
  - Amherst News-Times of Amherst
  - The Clyde Enterprise of Clyde
  - Fulton County Expositor of Wauseon
  - Oberlin News Tribune of Oberlin
  - The Peninsula News of Marblehead
  - Swanton Enterprise of Swanton
  - The Wellington Enterprise of Wellington
- The Lima News of Lima
  - Putnam Voice (weekly) of Ottawa

Southern Ohio

- The Times-Gazette of Hillsboro
- Weekly newspapers:
  - The News-Democrat of Georgetown
  - People's Defender of West Union
  - The Ripley Bee of Ripley

Western Ohio (Dayton area)

- The Daily Advocate of Greenville
- Fairborn Daily Herald of Fairborn
- News Journal of Wilmington
- Piqua Daily Call of Piqua
- Sidney Daily News of Sidney
- Troy Daily News of Troy
- Xenia Daily Gazette of Xenia
- Times Community Newspapers weeklies:
  - Beavercreek News-Current of Beavercreek
  - Centerville-Washington Township Times of Centerville
  - Englewood Independent of Englewood
  - Enon Messenger of Enon
  - Huber Heights Courier of Huber Heights
  - Kettering-Oakwood Times of Kettering
  - New Carlisle Sun of New Carlisle
  - Springboro Sun of Springboro
  - Sugarcreek Bellbrook Times of Bellbrook
  - Vandalia Drummer News of Vandalia
  - Weekly Record Herald of Tipp City
- Other weekly newspapers:
  - Miami County Advocate of Piqua
  - Register-Herald of Eaton
  - Star Republican of Wilmington
