= Brown Publishing Company =

American newspaper publisher

Brown Publishing Company was a privately owned Cincinnati, Ohio, newspaper business started by Congressman Clarence J. Brown in Blanchester, Ohio in 1920. It ended 90 years of operations in August/September 2010 with its bankruptcy and sale of assets to a new company formed by its creditors and called Ohio Community Media Inc. The company was previously a family-owned business; it published 18 daily newspapers, 27 weekly newspapers, and 26 free weeklies. The former CEO was Brown's grandson, Roy Brown. The chairman of the board was Roy's father Bud Brown, also father of actor Clancy Brown.

== Bankruptcy proceedings ==
On April 30, 2010, the company and its subsidiaries filed for bankruptcy in federal court in Central Islip, New York, in the Eastern District of New York in Docket 10-73295. It listed Brown and 14 affiliates, with assets of $94.1 million and $104.6 million in debts as of March 31, 2010. Its affiliates included Delaware Gazette Co., Texas Business News LLC, Utah Business Publishers LLC, Texas Community Newspapers Inc., Upstate Business News LLC, Troy Daily News Inc., SC Biz News LLC, ARG LLC, Brown Business Ledger LLC, Dan's Papers Inc., Business Publications LLC.

Several key executives of Brown Publishing submitted a plan to purchase key assets of the company under the auspices of a newly created company, Brown Media Holdings. This plan fell through when a key lender backing the plan withdrew its offer.

On September 3, 2010, it was announced that Manhattan Media had purchased Dan's Papers, Montauk Pioneer, and Hampton Style Magazine from Brown.

Later in September, Brown's 14 Ohio dailies and about 50 weekly publications were transferred to Ohio Community Media, a new entity owned by Brown's creditors, in a transaction valued at $21.75 million. Over the next few months, the new company sold a "mini-empire" of business newsweeklies which Brown had assembled starting in 2007. The company sold titles in cities including Charleston, South Carolina; Cheyenne, Wyoming; Fort Worth, Texas; and Naperville, Illinois.

Philadelphia-based Versa Capital Management completed its purchase of Ohio Community Media for an undisclosed price in May 2011. By this point, the chain consisted of 14 daily newspapers and about 30 weeklies, all located in Ohio.

== Publications ==
=== Dailies ===
- Beavercreek - News Current
- Delaware - Delaware Gazette
- Fairborn - Daily Herald
- Galion - Inquirer
- Greenville - Advocate
- Hillsboro - Times-Gazette
- London - Madison Press
- Piqua - Daily Call
- Sidney - Daily News
- Troy - Daily News
- Urbana - Daily Citizen
- Washington Court House - Record-Herald
- Wilmington - News Journal
- Xenia - Daily Gazette

=== Paid weeklies ===
- Bellville - The Bellville Star
- Cardington - Morrow County Independent
- Columbus Grove - Putnam County Vidette
- Dayton - Times Community Newspapers
- Eaton - The Register-Herald
- Englewood Independent
- Athens The Athens Messenger
- Huber Heights Courier
- New Carlisle Sun Times Weekend Edition
- Tipp City Herald
- Vandalia Drummer News
- West Milton Record
- Fredericktown - Knox County Citizen
- Georgetown - The News Democrat
- Jackson - Times Journal
- McArthur - Vinton County Courier
- Mechanicsburg - The Telegram
- Mount Gilead - The Morrow County Sentinel
- Mount Sterling - The Tribune
- New Lexington - Perry County Tribune
- Ottawa - Putnam County Sentinel
- Plain City - Plain City Advocate
- Ripley - The Ripley Bee
- Sunbury - The Sunbury News
- Waverly - Pike County News Watchman
- West Union - People's Defender

=== Free weeklies ===
==== Ohio ====
- Circleville - Pickaway County Paper
- Dayton - The Scoop
- Dayton - Times Community Newspapers
- Beavercreek News-Current Extra
- Centerville-Bellbrook Times
- Kettering-Oakwood Times
- Springboro Sun
- Wright-Patterson AFB - Skywrighter
- Eaton - Weekend Edition
- Galion - Advertiser
- Gallipolis - River Cities & More
- Georgetown - The News Democrat (Sunday)
- Greenville - Sunday Edition
- Hillsboro - The County Shopper
- Jackson - Community Shopper
- London - Madison Press Weekly Review
- Mount Gilead - Morrow County Advertiser
- New Lexington - Perry County Shopper
- Ottawa - Putnam County Advertiser
- Piqua - Miami County Advocate
- Portsmouth - The Community Common
- Urbana - Sunday Extra
- Van Wert - Sign of the Times
- Washington C.H. - South Central Ohio Shopper
- Waverly/Chillicothe - Pike/Ross County Paper
- West Union - People's Defender (Weekend Edition)
- Wilmington - Star Republican
- Xenia - Greene County Shopper

==== Former holdings, New York ====
- Bridgehampton, New York - Dan's Papers
- Bridgehampton, New York - Hampton Style
- Montauk, New York - Montauk Pioneer
