= Heartland Publications =

Heartland Publications, LLC
- Company type: Private
- Industry: Newspapers, marketing
- Founded: 2004
- Defunct: 2012
- Fate: Merged
- Successor: Civitas Media
- Headquarters: Clinton, Connecticut
- Key people: Michael Bush
- Products: Daily and weekly newspapers
- Parent: The Wicks Group of Companies and Wachovia Capital Partners
- Website: heartlandpublications.com

Heartland Publications was a Connecticut-based owner of small to medium market newspapers, and started out by acquiring 24 publications from Community Newspaper Holdings, Inc. located in Georgia, Kentucky, North Carolina, Ohio, Oklahoma, Tennessee, and West Virginia. They acquired 5 additional publications from Mid-South Management Co., Inc. in 2005 and 2007, located in South Carolina, North Carolina, Georgia, Virginia, and West Virginia.

Heartland Publications filed for Chapter 11 bankruptcy protection in 2009, and left bankruptcy in 2010 under control of its creditors. It was acquired by Versa Capital Management in 2012, and along with Freedom Central, Impressions Media, and Ohio Community Media, were consolidating into Civitas Media.

== Newspapers published ==
See: List of newspapers published by Civitas Media
