= Civitas Media =

Former newspaper publishing company

Civitas Media, LLC
- Type: Private
- Industry: Newspapers, marketing
- Founded: 2012
- Headquarters: Davidson, North Carolina, United States
- Products: Newspapers
- Number of employees: 1,200
- Parent: Versa Capital Management
- Website: civitasmedia.com

Civitas Media, LLC was a Davidson, North Carolina–based publisher of community newspapers covering 11 Midwestern, Mid-Atlantic, and Southern states.

== History ==
The company was formed in 2012 via the merger of Heartland Publications, Impressions Media, Ohio Community Media, and Freedom Communications' central division.

In 2017, Civitas sold its newspapers in Ohio, Missouri, West Virginia, Kentucky, Illinois, Tennessee, Virginia, North Carolina, South Carolina, and Oklahoma. It kept the Times Leader in Wilkes-Barre, Pennsylvania, until it sold that newspaper in 2019.
