= Impressions Media =

American newspaper publisher

- Company type: Private
- Industry: Newspapers, marketing
- Founded: 1939, as Wilkes-Barre Publishing Company
- Headquarters: 15 North Main Street, Wilkes-Barre, Pennsylvania 18711, United States
- Area served: Northeastern Pennsylvania
- Key people: Prashant Shitut, CEO; Allison Uhrin, CFO; Joe Butkiewicz, exec. editor
- Products: Times Leader and several weekly newspapers
- Parent: Versa Capital Management
- Website: www.impressionsmedia.biz

Impressions Media is an American privately owned publisher of newspapers in Northeastern Pennsylvania, USA. It is headquartered in Wilkes-Barre, Pennsylvania, and owned by Philadelphia-based Versa Capital Management.

== Holdings ==
The company publishes Times Leader, a daily newspaper in Wilkes-Barre, and several weekly newspapers covering surrounding communities:

- The Abington Journal of Clarks Summit, Pennsylvania, founded 1947
- The Dallas Post of Dallas, Pennsylvania, founded 1889
- Go Lackawanna of Scranton, Pennsylvania, founded 2010
- The Sunday Dispatch of Pittston, Pennsylvania
- Weekender entertainment weekly covering Northeastern Pennsylvania, founded 1993
