= List of newspapers owned by GateHouse Media =

This list includes daily and weekly newspapers owned by GateHouse Media Inc.

== Alabama ==
Gatehouse publishes two daily newspapers in Alabama

- The Gadsden Times, daily, of Gadsden
- The Tuscaloosa News, daily, of Tuscaloosa

== Arizona ==
Gatehouse publishes one weekly newspapers in Arizona

- The Arizona Capitol Times of Phoenix

== Arkansas ==
GateHouse publishes two daily newspapers, 17 paid weeklies and 12 free weeklies (not listed) in Arkansas, in addition to one shopper publications (not listed):

- Southwest Times Record of Fort Smith
- Stuttgart Daily Leader of Stuttgart
- Greenwood Democrat, paid weekly, of Greenwood
- Boonville Democrat, paid weekly, of Booneville
- Cabot Star-Herald, paid weekly, of Cabot
- Charleston Express, paid weekly, of Greenwood
- Press Argus-Courier, paid weekly, of Van Buren
- Alma Journal, paid weekly, of Van Buren
- The Jacksonville Patriot, paid weekly, of Jacksonville
- Maumelle Monitor, paid weekly, of Maumelle
- Paris Express, paid weekly, of Paris
- Gurdon Times, paid weekly, of Gurdon
- Newport Independent, paid weekly, of Newport
- The Sun-Times, paid weekly, of Heber Springs
- The White Hall Journal, paid weekly, of White Hall
- The Van Buren County Democrat, paid weekly, of Van Buren County
- The Helena-West Helena World of Helena
- Hot Springs Village Voice of Hot Springs Village

== California ==
GateHouse publishes five daily newspapers and six paid weeklies in California, in addition to nine free weeklies and shopper publications (not listed) associated with its newspaper products, and the Local Yellow Pages in Sacramento:

- Daily Press of Victorville
- The Daily Independent of Ridgecrest
- The Record, daily, of Stockton
- Siskiyou Daily News of Yreka
- Taft Midway Driller, weekly, of Taft
- Mt. Shasta Area Newspapers weeklies:
  - The Dunsmuir News of Dunsmuir
  - Mount Shasta Herald of Mount Shasta
  - Weed Press of Weed
- Lucerne Valley Leader, paid weekly, of Lucerne Valley
- The Gridley Herald, weekly, of Gridley

== Colorado ==
GateHouse publishes one daily newspaper and three paid weeklies in Colorado:

- Ag Journal, weekly, of La Junta
- Bent County Democrat, weekly, of Las Animas
- Fowler Tribune, weekly, of Fowler
- The Pueblo Chieftain, of Pueblo
- The Tribune-Democrat of La Junta

== Connecticut ==
- The Bulletin of Norwich, Connecticut

== Delaware ==
GateHouse publishes six weekly newspapers in Delaware:

- The Community News of Hockessin
- Dover Post of Dover
- Middletown Transcript of Middletown
- Milford Beacon of Milford
- Smyrna/Clayton Sun-Times of Smyrna
- Sussex Countian of Georgetown

== Florida ==
GateHouse publishes 15 newspapers in Florida:

- The Gainesville Sun of Gainesville, Florida
- The Destin Log of Destin, Florida
- The Walton Sun of Walton County, Florida
- Crestview News Bulletin of Crestview, Florida
- The Daytona Beach News-Journal of Daytona Beach, Florida
- Florida Times-Union of Jacksonville, Florida
- Northwest Florida Daily News of Ft. Walton Beach, Florida
- Santa Rosa Press Gazette of Santa Rosa Beach, Florida
- Panama City News Herald of Panama City, Florida
- Washington County News of Washington County, Florida
- Holmes County Advertiser of Holmes County, Florida
- Apalachicola Times of Apalachicola, Florida
- The Star of Port St. Joe, Florida
- The Palm Beach Post of West Palm Beach, Florida
- The Palm Beach Daily News of Palm Beach, Florida
- The Sarasota Herald Tribune of Sarasota, FL (since 2015)
- Naples Daily News, FL (since 2019)

== Georgia ==
GateHouse Media publishes three daily and five weekly newspapers in Georgia.

- Athens Banner-Herald, daily, of Athens
- Augusta Chronicle, daily, of Augusta
- Savannah Morning News, daily, of Savannah
- The Columbia County News-Times, weekly, of Evans
- The News and Farmer, weekly, of Louisville
- Bryan County Now, weekly, of Richmond Hill
- Effingham Now, weekly, of Rincon
- Sylvania Telephone, weekly, of Sylvania

== Illinois ==
GateHouse Media Illinois publishes 21 daily newspapers and 55 weeklies in Illinois, in addition to numerous shopper publications:

=== Central Illinois ===
Henry County

- Star Courier of Kewanee
- Henry County weekly newspapers:
  - Cambridge Chronicle of Cambridge
  - Galva News of Galva
  - Geneseo Republic of Geneseo
  - Orion Gazette of Orion
- These weekly papers were combined in March 2019, under the name Henry County Republic, and headquartered in the Geneseo location.

Peoria-Canton area

- Daily Ledger of Canton
- Journal Star of Peoria
  - Bradley Hoops, weekly, of Peoria
- Pekin Daily Times of Pekin
- TimesNewspapers weeklies:
  - Chillicothe Times-Bulletin of Chillicothe and Dunlap
  - Washington Times-Reporter of Washington
  - Woodford Times of Woodford County
  - East Peoria Times-Courier of East Peoria
  - Morton Times-News of Morton

Western Illinois (Forgottonia)

- The McDonough County Voice of Macomb
- The Register-Mail of Galesburg
  - Knox County Neighbors, weekly, of Galesburg (formerly The Paper)
- Daily Review Atlas of Monmouth
- Eagle Publications weeklies:
  - Argus Sentinel of Abingdon and Avon
  - Eagle-Scribe of Augusta
  - Macomb Eagle of Macomb
  - Roseville Independent of Roseville
- Other weekly newspapers:
  - The Times Record of Aledo
  - Oquawka Current of Oquawka

Other newspapers

- The Daily Leader of Pontiac
  - Home Times, weekly, of Flanagan
  - The Blade, weekly, of Fairbury
- Lincoln Courier of Lincoln
- The State Journal-Register of Springfield

=== Chicago suburbs ===
GateHouse's second-largest chain of weekly newspapers covers the western suburbs of Chicago. In addition to the print product, the cities and villages covered by Suburban Life Publications are also served by the hyperlocal town-by-town websites at mysuburbanlife.com. Gatehouse Media sold the chain to Dixon, Illinois-based Shaw Media Group on 1 October 2012

All of the following are weekly newspapers:

- Batavia Republican of Batavia
- Bartlett Press of Bartlett, Hanover Park and Streamwood
- Berwyn-Cicero Life of Berwyn, Cicero, Forest View and Stickney
- Bolingbrook-Romeoville Reporter of Bolingbrook and Romeoville
- Downers Grove Reporter of Downers Grove
- Elmhurst Press of Elmhurst
- The Farmside of Huntley and Marengo
- Geneva Republican of Geneva
- Glen Ellyn News of Glen Ellyn
- Lemont Reporter of Lemont
- Lisle-Naperville Reporter of Lisle and Naperville
- Lombard Spectator of Lombard
- Northeast DuPage Press of Addison, Bensenville and Wood Dale
- Northwest DuPage Press of Bloomingdale, Carol Stream, Glendale Heights, Itasca and Roselle
- St. Charles Republican of Saint Charles and Wayne
- Suburban Life of Berkeley, Broadview, Countryside, Hillside, Hodgkins, Indian Head Park, La Grange, La Grange Park, Westchester, Western Springs and Willow Springs
- Suburban Life of Brookfield, Lyons, McCook, North Riverside and Riverside
- Suburban Life of Burr Ridge, Clarendon Hills, Darien, Hinsdale, Oak Brook, Oakbrook Terrace and Willowbrook
- Villa Park Argus of Villa Park
- West DuPage Press of Warrenville, West Chicago and Winfield
- Westmont Progress of Westmont
- Wheaton Leader of Wheaton
- Woodridge Reporter of Woodridge

=== Northwestern Illinois ===
- The Journal Standard of Freeport
- Rockford Register Star of Rockford

=== Southern Illinois ===
Southwestern Illinois

- The Benton Evening News of Benton
- Daily American of West Frankfort
- Du Quoin Evening Call of Du Quoin
- The Daily Republican of Marion
- Randolph County weekly newspapers:
  - The Randolph County Herald Tribune of Chester
  - Steeleville Ledger of Steeleville
- Other weekly newspapers:
  - The Ashley News of Ashley
  - Christopher Progress of Christopher
  - Herrin Spokesman of Herrin
  - Murphysboro American of Murphysboro

Southeastern Illinois

- The Carmi Times of Carmi
  - Norris City Banner, weekly, of Norris City
- The Daily Register of Harrisburg
- The Eldorado Daily Journal of Eldorado
- Gallatin County weekly newspapers:
  - Ridgway News of Ridgway
  - Gallatin Democrat of Shawneetown

Wabash Valley

- Olney Daily Mail of Olney
- Daily Mail Group weeklies:
  - Advocate Press of Flora
  - Newton Press Mentor of Newton
  - Teutopolis Press of Dieterich and Teutopolis
  - The Weekly Mail of Olney

== Indiana ==
- South Bend Tribune of South Bend, Indiana
- Times Mail of Bedford, Indiana
- Evening World of Spencer, Indiana
- The Herald-Times of Bloomington, Indiana
- The Hoosier Topics of Cloverdale, Indiana
- Reporter-Times of Martinsville, Indiana
- Mooresville-Decatur Times of Mooresville, Indiana

== Iowa and Nebraska ==
GateHouse publishes three weekly newspapers along the Iowa-Nebraska border:

- The Hamburg Reporter of Hamburg, Iowa
- Nebraska City News-Press of Nebraska City, Nebraska
- Syracuse Journal-Democrat of Syracuse, Nebraska

=== Other Iowa newspapers ===
- Ames Tribune
- Boone News Republican
- Dallas County News
- Hamburg Reporter
- The Hawk Eye of Burlington, Iowa
- Nevada Journal
- Perry Chief
- Story City Herald, Story City, Iowa
- Tri-County Times

== Kansas ==
GateHouse publishes 14 daily newspapers and seven weeklies in Kansas, and several shopper publications (not listed) in most of its newspaper markets: Wichita area and central Kansas

- Butler County Times-Gazette of El Dorado, Kansas, a merger of the former Augusta Gazette and El Dorado Times, published twice weekly.
  - Andover American, weekly, of Andover, Kansas
- Hays Daily News
- The Hutchinson News
- McPherson Sentinel of McPherson, Kansas
- The Kansan of Newton, Kansas
- Ottawa Herald
- The Salina Journal
- Wellington Daily News of Wellington, Kansas

Western Kansas

- Dodge City Daily Globe of Dodge City, Kansas
  - La Estrella, Spanish-language weekly, of Dodge City, Kansas
- Garden City Telegram
- Weekly newspapers:
  - Kiowa County Signal, weekly, of Greensburg, Kansas
  - The Pratt Tribune, tri-weekly, of Pratt, Kansas
  - The St. John News, weekly, of St. John, Kansas

Kansas City area

- The Examiner of Independence, Missouri
- Leavenworth Times of Leavenworth, Kansas
  - The Fort Leavenworth Lamp, weekly, of Fort Leavenworth
  - Lansing This Week, weekly, of Lansing, Kansas

== Louisiana ==
GateHouse publishes four daily newspapers and six weeklies in Louisiana, as well as several shopper publications (not listed):

- Baton Rouge area weeklies:
  - Donaldsonville Chief of Donaldsonville
  - Gonzales Weekly Citizen of Gonzales
  - Plaquemine Post South of Plaquemine
- The Bastrop Daily Enterprise of Bastrop
- Beauregard Daily News of DeRidder
- Leesville Daily Leader of Leesville
- Calcasieu Parish weeklies:
  - The Moss Bluff News of Moss Bluff
  - Southwest Daily News, tri-weekly, of Sulphur
  - Vinton News of Vinton
  - The Westlake News of Westlake

== Maryland ==
- The Herald-Mail of Hagerstown, Maryland
- Daily Record of Baltimore

== Massachusetts ==
GateHouse Media New England publishes several daily newspapers in Massachusetts, and 113 weeklies in Massachusetts, in addition to numerous shopper publications. In tandem with the print product, the cities and towns covered by GateHouse weeklies and dailies in Massachusetts are also served by the hyperlocal town-by-town websites at WickedLocal.com.

=== Dailies ===
- The Cape Cod Times of Hyannis, Massachusetts
- The Enterprise of Brockton, Massachusetts
- The Gardner News of Gardner, Massachusetts
- The Herald News of Fall River, Massachusetts
- O Jornal, Portuguese-language weekly, of Fall River
- The MetroWest Daily News of Framingham, Massachusetts
- The Milford Daily News of Milford, Massachusetts
- The Patriot Ledger of Quincy, Massachusetts
- Taunton Daily Gazette of Taunton, Massachusetts
- Telegram & Gazette of Worcester, Massachusetts

=== Boston-area weeklies ===
GateHouse's largest weekly newspaper market is Massachusetts, where it owns more than 100 titles in and around Boston. Several of these newspapers cover more than one town, and WickedLocal maintains separate websites for each town. All of the following are weekly newspapers in Massachusetts:

Cape Cod

- Bourne Courier of Bourne
- The Bulletin of Falmouth and Mashpee
- The Cape Codder of Brewster, Chatham, Eastham and Orleans
- Harwich Oracle of Harwich
- Provincetown Banner of Provincetown, Truro and Wellfleet
- The Sandwich Broadsider of Sandwich
- The Register of Barnstable, Dennis and Yarmouth

Metro Boston (city neighborhoods and adjoining suburbs)

- Allston-Brighton Tab of Allston and Brighton (Boston)
- Brookline Tab of Brookline
- Cambridge Chronicle of Cambridge
- Cambridge Tab of Cambridge
- The Dedham Transcript of Dedham
- Dover-Sherborn Press of Dover and Sherborn
- Roslindale Transcript of Roslindale (Boston)
- Somerville Journal of Somerville
- Needham Times of Needham
- Newton Tab of Newton
- Waltham News Tribune of Waltham
- Watertown Tab & Press of Watertown
- The Wellesley Townsman of Wellesley
- West Roxbury Transcript of West Roxbury (Boston)

North of Boston (the Massachusetts North Shore)

- Amesbury News of Amesbury
- Beverly Citizen of Beverly
- Danvers Herald of Danvers
- Cape Ann Beacon of Gloucester (serving all of Cape Ann)
- Georgetown Record of Georgetown
- Hamilton Wenham Chronicle of Hamilton and Wenham
- Ipswich Chronicle of Ipswich
- Malden Observer of Malden
- Marblehead Reporter of Marblehead
- Medford Transcript of Medford
- Melrose Free Press of Melrose
- Newburyport Current of Newburyport and surrounding towns
- North Andover Citizen of North Andover
- North Shore Sunday of Lynn, Peabody and surrounding towns
- Salem Gazette of Salem
- Saugus Advertiser of Saugus
- Stoneham Sun of Stoneham
- Swampscott Reporter of Swampscott
- Tri-Town Transcript of Boxford, Middleton and Topsfield
- Wakefield Observer of Wakefield

Northwest of Boston (northern Middlesex County and northeastern Worcester County)

- The Arlington Advocate of Arlington
- The Beacon of Acton and Boxborough
- The Beacon-Villager of Maynard and Stow
- Bedford Minuteman of Bedford
- Belmont Citizen-Herald of Belmont
- Billerica Minuteman of Billerica
- The Bolton Common of Bolton
- Burlington Union of Burlington
- Chelmsford Independent of Chelmsford
- The Concord Journal of Concord
- The Harvard Post of Harvard
- Lexington Minuteman of Lexington
- Lincoln Journal of Lincoln
- Littleton Independent of Littleton
- Tewksbury Advocate of Tewksbury
- Times & Courier of Clinton and Lancaster
- The Reading Advocate of Reading
- Westford Eagle of Westford
- Wilmington Advocate of Wilmington
- The Winchester Star of Winchester
- Woburn Advocate of Woburn

South of Boston (the Massachusetts South Shore and South Coast)

- Abington Mariner of Abington
- Braintree Forum of Braintree
- Bridgewater Independent of Bridgewater
- Carver Reporter of Carver
- Cohasset Mariner of Cohasset
- Duxbury Reporter of Duxbury
- Halifax-Plympton Reporter of Halifax and Plympton
- Hanover Mariner of Hanover
- The Hingham Journal of Hingham
- Holbrook Sun of Holbrook
- Kingston Reporter of Kingston
- Lakeville Call of Lakeville
- Marshfield Mariner of Marshfield
- Norwell Mariner of Norwell
- Old Colony Memorial of Plymouth
- Pembroke Mariner-Reporter of Pembroke
- Randolph Herald of Randolph
- Raynham Call of Raynham
- Rockland Standard of Rockland
- Scituate Mariner of Scituate
- The Sentinel of Marion, Mattapoisett and Rochester
- Wareham Courier of Wareham
- Weymouth News of Weymouth

West of Boston (MetroWest, with adjacent portions of Bristol and Norfolk counties)

- Ashland Tab of Ashland
- Canton Journal of Canton
- The Country Gazette of Franklin and surrounding towns
- Easton Journal of Easton
- Framingham Tab of Framingham
- Holliston Tab of Holliston
- Hopkinton Crier of Hopkinton
- Hudson Sun of Hudson
- Mansfield News of Mansfield
- Marlborough Enterprise of Marlborough
- Medfield Press of Medfield
- Natick Bulletin & Tab of Natick
- The North Attleborough Free Press of North Attleborough
- Norton Mirror of Norton
- Norwood Bulletin of Norwood
- Sharon Advocate of Sharon
- Shrewsbury Chronicle of Shrewsbury
- Stoughton Journal of Stoughton
- The Sudbury Town Crier of Sudbury
- The Villager of Northborough and Southborough
- The Wayland Town Crier of Wayland
- The Westborough News of Westborough
- The Weston Town Crier of Weston
- Westwood Press of Westwood

== Michigan ==
GateHouse publishes nine dailies and four weekly newspapers in Michigan, plus several shoppers (not listed) related to its newspaper properties:

- Cheboygan Daily Tribune of Cheboygan
- Bronson Journal, weekly, of Bronson
- The Daily Reporter of Coldwater
- The Daily Telegram of Adrian
- The Evening News of Sault Ste. Marie
- Hillsdale Daily News of Hillsdale
- The Holland Sentinel of Holland
- Ionia Sentinel-Standard of Ionia
- Jonesville Independent, weekly, of Jonesville
- Mackinac Journal, weekly, of Cheboygan
- Monroe News, daily, of Monroe
- Sturgis Journal of Sturgis
- West Michigan Senior Times, weekly, of Kalamazoo
- Petoskey News-Review, daily, of Petoskey
- Charlevoix Courier, weekly, of Charlevoix
- Gaylord Herald Times, weekly, of Gaylord

== Minnesota ==
GateHouse publishes one daily newspaper and nine weeklies in Minnesota, in addition to several shoppers (not listed) associated with its newspaper properties:

- Crookston Daily Times of Crookston
- Granite Falls Advocate Tribune, weekly, of Granite Falls
- Montevideo American-News, weekly, of Montevideo
- Redwood Falls Gazette, weekly, of Redwood Falls
- Redwood Falls Livewire, weekly, of Redwood Falls
- The Sleepy Eye Herald Dispatch, weekly, of Sleepy Eye
- St. James Plaindealer, weekly, of St. James
- Tri-County News, weekly, of Cottonwood
- The Valley Journal, weekly, of Halstad
- The Wabasso Standard, weekly, of Wabasso

== Missouri ==
GateHouse publishes 13 dailies and eight weeklies in Missouri, in addition to several shoppers (not listed) associated with its newspaper properties:

Northern Missouri

- Boonville Daily News of Boonville, Missouri
- Chillicothe Constitution-Tribune of Chillicothe, Missouri
- Hannibal Courier-Post of Hannibal, Missouri
- Kirksville Daily Express of Kirksville, Missouri
- Linn County Leader, tri-weekly, of Brookfield, Missouri
- Macon Chronicle-Herald of Macon, Missouri
- The Mexico Ledger of Mexico, Missouri
- Moberly Monitor-Index of Moberly, Missouri

Central Missouri

- The Columbia Daily Tribune of Columbia, Missouri

Southern Missouri

- The Daily Guide of Waynesville, Missouri
- Lake Sun Leader of Camdenton, Missouri
  - Lake Area News Focus, weekly, of Osage Beach, Missouri
  - WestSide Star, weekly, of Laurie, Missouri
- The Rolla Daily News of Rolla, Missouri
  - St. James Leader-Journal, weekly, of St. James, Missouri

Four State Area (Joplin area)

- The Carthage Press of Carthage, Missouri
- The Morning Sun of Pittsburg, Kansas
- Weekly newspapers:
  - The Aurora Advertiser of Aurora, Missouri
  - Girard Press of Girard, Kansas
  - The Vedette of Greenfield, Missouri

== New Jersey ==
- New Jersey Herald, Sunday-Friday, of Newton, New Jersey
- Burlington County Times, Sunday-Friday, of Westampton, New Jersey

== New York ==
GateHouse publishes eight daily newspapers and 13 weeklies in Upstate New York, as well as several shopper publications (not listed) associated with its newspaper properties:

Genesee Valley and Southern Tier

- Evening Tribune of Hornell
- The Leader of Corning
- Wellsville Daily Reporter of Wellsville
- Weekly newspapers:
  - The Chronicle-Express of Penn Yan
  - Genesee Country Express of Dansville
  - Steuben Courier of Bath

Mohawk Valley

- Observer-Dispatch of Utica
  - Mid-York Weekly of Hamilton
- The Times Telegram

Rochester area

- Daily Messenger of Canandaigua
- Messenger Post Newspapers weeklies:
  - Brighton-Pittsford Post of Brighton and Pittsford
  - Fairport-East Rochester Post of East Rochester, Fairport and Perinton
  - Gates-Chili Post of Chili and Gates
  - Greece Post of Greece
  - Irondequoit Post of Irondequoit
  - Penfield Post of Penfield
  - Rush-Henrietta Post of Henrietta and Rush
  - Victor Post of Farmington and Victor
  - Wayne Post of Palmyra and Wayne County

Ulster County

- Saugerties Post Star, weekly, of Saugerties

== North Dakota ==
- Devils Lake Daily Journal of Devils Lake, North Dakota

== Ohio ==
GateHouse publishes four dailies, numerous weeklies, along with assorted shoppers and specialty publications (not all listed), in Franklin, Delaware, Licking, Fairfield, Union, Summit County and Tuscarawas counties, in Ohio:

- Akron Beacon Journal of Akron
- The Columbus Dispatch of Columbus
- The Daily Jeffersonian of Cambridge
- The Daily Record of Wooster
- ThisWeek Newspapers of Columbus
- Columbus Monthly of Columbus
- The Independent of Massillon
- The Repository of Canton
- The Suburbanite, weekly, of Green and south suburban Akron
- The Times-Reporter of Dover-New Philadelphia

== Oklahoma ==
GateHouse publishes five daily, four weekly and five shopper newspapers in Oklahoma:

- Bartlesville Examiner-Enterprise of Bartlesville
- Miami News-Record of Miami
- The Ardmoreite of Ardmore
- The Journal Record of Oklahoma City
- The Oklahoman of Oklahoma City
- The Shawnee News-Star of Shawnee
- Delaware County Journal Grove, weekly, of Delaware County
- Grove Sun, weekly, of Grove
- Pawhuska Journal-Capital, weekly, of Pawhuska
- Friday Gazette, weekly, of McLoud

== Oregon ==
GateHouse publishes one daily newspaper in Oregon:

- The Register-Guard, daily, of Eugene, Oregon

== Pennsylvania and West Virginia ==
GateHouse publishes three daily newspapers and three weeklies in Pennsylvania, and one of each in West Virginia, clustered in two groups of four:

Scranton area

- The Wayne Independent of Honesdale, Pennsylvania
- Carbondale News, weekly, of Carbondale, Pennsylvania
- The News Eagle, weekly, of Hawley, Pennsylvania
- The Villager, weekly, of Moscow, Pennsylvania

South Central Pennsylvania and West Virginia

- Echo Pilot, weekly, of Greencastle, Pennsylvania
- The Jackson Herald, weekly, of Ripley, West Virginia
- Mineral Daily News Tribune of Keyser, West Virginia
- The Record Herald of Waynesboro, Pennsylvania

=== Other Pennsylvania newspapers ===
- Pocono Record, daily, of Stroudsburg, Pennsylvania
- Erie Times-News, daily, of Erie, Pennsylvania
- Daily American of Somerset, Pennsylvania

== Rhode Island ==
Gatehouse media publishes two daily newspapers, two weekly publications, and one monthly and one bi-monthly magazines in Rhode Island. On October 26, 2017, Gatehouse media acquired Edward A. Sherman Publishing that included a daily newspaper, a commercial printing division, and three monthly publications based out of Newport.

- The Providence Journal of Providence, Rhode Island
  - Rhode Island Lawyers Weekly of Providence, Rhode Island
  - A La Carte TMC, a weekly shopper publication Providence, Rhode Island
- The Newport Daily News of Newport, Rhode Island
  - Newport Life Magazine bi-monthly, of Newport, Rhode Island
  - Mercury, a publication of The Newport Daily News

== South Dakota ==
- The American News of Aberdeen, South Dakota
- Watertown Public Opinion of Watertown, South Dakota

== Tennessee ==
- The Oak Ridger of Oak Ridge, Tennessee

== Texas ==
GateHouse publishes seven daily, 11 weekly and 13 shopper newspapers in Texas:

- Amarillo Globe-News, daily, of Amarillo
- Austin American-Statesman, daily, of Austin
- Brownwood Bulletin, daily, of Brownwood
- Lubbock Avalanche-Journal, daily, of Lubbock
- The Herald Democrat, daily, of Sherman and Denison
- Stephenville Empire-Tribune, daily, of Stephenville
- Waxahachie Daily Light, daily, of Waxahachie
- Alice Echo-News Journal, weekly, of Alice
- Anna-Melissa Tribune, weekly, of Anna and Melissa
- Ballinger Ledger, weekly, of Ballinger
- Duval County Press, weekly, of Duval County
- Freer Press, weekly, of Freer
- Glen Rose Reporter, weekly, of Glen Rose
- Midlothian Mirror, weekly, of Midlothian
- Nueces County Record Star, weekly, of Robstown
- Prosper Press, weekly, of Prosper
- Van Alstyne Leader, weekly, of Van Alstyne
- Winters Enterprise, weekly, of Winters

== Virginia ==
- The Progress-Index, daily, of Petersburg, Virginia
- Virginia Lawyers Weekly, paid weekly, of Richmond, Virginia
- Colonial Voice, a weekly shopper, of Richmond, Virginia
