= List of newspapers in Missouri =

This is a list of newspapers circulated in Missouri.

== Current news publications ==
- The Beacon (Kansas City) - Kansas City metropolitan area
- Belle Banner - Belle
- Bland Courier - Bland
- Boonville Daily News - Boonville
- California Democrat - California
- Cassville Democrat - Cassville
- Chronicle Herald - Macon
- Columbia Daily Tribune - Columbia
- Columbia Missourian - Columbia
- Constitution Tribune - Chillicothe
- Courier-Tribune - Liberty
- Daily Journal - Park Hills
- The Daily Star-Journal - Warrensburg
- Delta Dunklin Democrat - Kennett
- The Fireside Guard - Centralia
- Hannibal Courier-Post - Hannibal
- Independence Examiner - Independence
- Jefferson City News Tribune - Jefferson City
- Joplin Globe - Joplin
- The Kaleidoscope Weekly - St. James
- The Kansas City Star - Kansas City
- Kirksville Daily Express - Kirksville
- Lake Sun Leader - Camdenton
- The Lebanon Daily Record - Lebanon
- Lincoln County Journal - Troy
- Marshall Democrat-News - Marshall
- Maryville Daily Forum - Maryville
- The Mexico Ledger - Mexico
- Missouri Free Press - Diggins
- Moberly Monitor Index - Moberly
- Mound City News - Mound City
- Neosho Daily News - Neosho
- The New Evening Whirl - St. Louis
- North Cass Herald - Belton
- Parkland News - Farmington
- Pike County News - Bowling Green
- Phelps County Focus -Rolla
- Rich Hill Mining Review - Rich Hill
- Sedalia Democrat - Sedalia
- South County Times - Crestwood, Sunset Hills, Affton, Sappington Concord Village, and Fenton
- Southeast Missourian - Cape Girardeau
- Springfield News-Leader - Springfield
- St. Joseph News-Press - St. Joseph,
- St. Louis Intelligencer - St. Louis
- St. Louis Post-Dispatch - St. Louis
- St. Louis Reveille - St. Louis
- The Leader - Festus
- The Odessan - Odessa
- Tipton Times - Tipton
- Trenton Republican-Times - Trenton
- Unterrified Democrat - Linn
- Washington Missourian - Washington
- Webster-Kirkwood Times - Webster Groves, Kirkwood, Shrewsbury, Oakland, Des Peres, Warson Woods, Glendale, and Rock Hill.
- West End Word - St. Louis
- West Plains Daily Quill - West Plains

== Defunct ==
- Branson Tri-Lakes News (1895-2026)
- The Carthage Press - Carthage
- Daily Commercial Bulletin and Missouri Literary Register (1836–1838)
- Daily Commercial Bulletin (1838–1841)
- The Daily Guide (1971-2018)
- Die Gasconade Zeitung (Hermann) (1873-187?)
- Evening and Morning Star
- Hermanner Volksblatt u. Gasconade Zeitung (Hermann) (1872–1873)
- Hermanner Volksblatt (Hermann) (1875–1928)
- Kansas City Journal-Post (1854–1942)
- Kansas City Times (1867–1990)
- Missouri Democrat St. Louis (1858)
- Monett Times - Monett
- Osage County Volksblatt (Westphalia) (1896-1917)
- Riverfront Times - St. Louis
- St. Louis Commercial Bulletin and Missouri Literary Register (1835–1836)
- St. James Leader-Journal (1896-2016)
- St. Joseph Gazette(1845–1988)
- St. Louis Globe-Democrat (1852-1986)
- St. Louis Republic (1808-1919)
- St. Louis Sun (1989–1990)

== See also ==
- List of newspapers
- List of newspapers in the United States by circulation
- List of defunct newspapers of the United States#Missouri
- List of African-American newspapers in Missouri
