= Bartlesville Examiner-Enterprise =

Newspaper in Bartlesville, Oklahoma

- Type: Daily newspaper
- Format: Broadsheet
- Owner: USA Today Co.
- Publisher: Kim Benedict, Mathew Pearson (General Manager)
- Staff writers: Melinda Brown, Emily Droege, Kris Dudley, Robert Smith (Pawhuska Bureau)
- Headquarters: 4125 Nowata Road, Bartlesville, OK, 74006; United States
- Circulation: 4,152 (as of 2018)
- Sister newspapers: Bartlesville (Okla.) Magazine, Pawhuska (Okla.) Journal-Capital, Hometown Shopper (Bartlesville, Okla.), The Oklahoman (Oklahoma City), The Journal Record (Oklahoma City), Tinker Take Off (Tinker AFB), The Ardmoreite (Ardmore, Okla.), Shawnee (Okla.) News-Star, Miami (Okla.) Times-Record, The Grove (Okla.) Sun, Bryan County (Okla.) News, Friday Gazette (McLoud, Okla.), Marshall/Johnston County (Okla.) Shopper
- Website: examiner-enterprise.com

The Bartlesville Examiner-Enterprise is an American daily newspaper in Bartlesville, Oklahoma. It was owned and published by Stephens Media LLC until 2015, when the Stephens Media newspapers were sold to New Media Investment Group, the parent company of GateHouse Media.

Additionally, the Bartlesville Examiner-Enterprise also designs and prints the Pawhuska Journal-Capital, Bartlesville Magazine, and Hometown Shopper from its plant in Bartlesville.

Sister Oklahoma publications include The Oklahoman, The Journal Record, Daily Ardmoreite, Shawnee News-Star, and Miami News Record.

== Subsidiary publications ==
- Bartlesville Magazine
- Pawhuska Journal-Capital
- Hometown Shopper (Washington and Osage Counties)
