= American Consolidated Media =

Defunct American newspaper publishing company

- Type: Private
- Industry: Media
- Founded: 1998
- Founder: Jeremy Halbreich
- Headquarters: 7301 N State Highway 161, Suite #270, Irving, Texas 75039 United States
- Key people: Scott Wright, CEO Rick Rogers, VP Operations; Navolia Bryant, VP Human Resources Michelle Smith, VP Sales & Marketing
- Products: Newspaper
- Owner: Various creditors
- Website: www.amconmedia.com

American Consolidated Media (ACM) was a United States publisher of approximately 100 daily and weekly newspapers, which it divested in 2014.

In March 2014, ACM announced the it was selling three of its regional newspaper groups, encompassing 34 publications — ACM-Superior, ACM-Ohio and ACM-Chesapeake — to Adams Publishing Group.

In July 2014, ACM sold its papers in Texas, Oklahoma, and Kansas (ACM-Southwest and ACM-Valley) to New Media Investment Group, said to be the "final divestiture" for ACM.

== History ==
The Macquarie Group of Australia bought American Consolidated Media in 2007 for $80 million. At that time, the company owned 40 newspapers in Texas and Oklahoma including five dailies (Alice Echo-News Journal, Brownwood Bulletin, Miami News-Record, Stephenville Empire-Tribune, Waxahachie Daily Light), 19 weeklies and 16 "shopper"-type products. Macquarie purchased ACM from a group of companies including Halyard Capital, Arena Capital Partners, multiple private equity funds in New York and one in Boston (BancBoston Ventures). Later that year, ACM acquired 11 publications in Ohio from Brown Publishing Company, 22 publications in Maryland from Chesapeake Publishing, and 19 publications of Superior Publishing in northern Minnesota, Wisconsin and Michigan from MCG Capital. At its largest, ACM published about 100 daily and weekly newspapers.

ACM violated a $133.7 million loan agreement in 2009, and a group of lenders took over the company from Macquarie subsidiary Southern Cross Media Group in 2010. Those creditors include Australia and New Zealand Banking Group, CIT Group, GE Commercial Finance, Macquarie Bank, National Australia Bank and Royal Bank of Canada.

=== Former newspapers, other publications (by group) ===
ACM-Superior

ACM-Ohio

ACM-Chesapeake

ACM-Southwest

- Waxahachie Daily Light
- Midlothian Mirror
- Stephenville Empire-Tribune
- Glen Rose Reporter
- Brownwood Bulletin
- Ballinger Ledger
- Winters Enterprise
- Alice Echo-News Journal
- Nueces County Record-Star
- Duval Press
- Freer Press
- Miami News-Record
- Grove Sun
- Delaware County Journal
- Cherokee County News-Advocate
- Ellis County Trading Post
- Cross Timbers Trading Post
- Heartland Trading Post
- Alice Review
- Northeast Oklahoma Trading Post

ACM-Valley

- Valley Bargain Book-Brownsville
- Valley Bargain Book-Harlingen
- Valley Town Crier (McAllen)
- Edinburg Review
- Laredo's Bargain Book and Ad Sack
