= CherryRoad Media =

American newspaper publisher

- Type: Private
- Industry: News media
- Genre: Publishing
- Founded: 2020
- Founder: Jeremy Gulban
- Headquarters: 6 Upper Pond Road, Parsippany, New Jersey, United States
- Key people: Lee Bachlet (COO)
- Revenue: $30 million (2024)
- Number of employees: 500 (2024)
- Parent: CherryRoad Technologies Inc.
- Website: cherryroad-media.com

CherryRoad Media is an American newspaper publisher and commercial printer based in New Jersey. It is the communications division of CherryRoad Technologies and was founded in 2020 by its CEO Jeremy Gulban. The company specializes in weekly publications in rural communities. It has received national media attention for rapidly buying and launching new titles amid the decline of newspapers.

As of May 2024, the company has acquired or started 85 newspapers across 18 states. Most of these papers print weekly, but three print five times a week and about a dozen print two or three times a week. CherryRoad Media employs about 500 people. Gulban said revenue will be an estimated $30 million for 2024.

== Business operations ==
=== Expansion strategy ===
CherryRoad Media owns newspapers in rural communities across the United States, with a large number of them bought from Gannett, now USA Today co. Print circulations for these papers are typically in the hundreds to low thousands. The company acquired so many titles in its first two years of operation that in 2022 it owned the eighth largest number of newspapers in the United States. CEO Jeremy Gulban has not publicly disclosed how much the company pays to acquire a newspaper, but in 2022 he said someone who wanted to buy a small weekly could probably do so for $100,000 or less. When it comes to the total number of papers CherryRoad intends to own, Gulban said his goal is to have about 10 publications in every U.S. state.

Some of the newspaper's CherryRoad has acquired were absorbed into titles with a larger circulation or merged to create a new publication. The company on at least four occasions launched new titles in markets where papers had recently shuttered, often hiring on staff from the closed papers.

=== Newsroom operations ===
CherryRoad Media typically employs one or two people on the editorial-side of its newsrooms. Small weeklies often have one full-time and one part time reporter. Larger papers have around two or three workers in the newsroom. CherryRoad uses its own web-based content management system and its websites come equipped with a paywall. Gulban said the company keeps regional and national content in its papers to a minimum, excluding its daily newspapers, and focuses on local stories.

The company tries to employ an advertising sales representative based in every market where they operate, but Gulban said he can't afford to hire local ad and page designers. CherryRoad uses several third-party software tools on the business-side of its newsrooms. The company employs the Community Publishing System, made by Software Consulting Services, to handle selling advertisements and uses the Column software tool to manage public notices.

=== Revenue streams ===
CherryRoad Media operates its newspapers with a low profit margin. Gulban said he could "get a steady 10% margin" from subscriptions and ad sales "and then drive other revenue at a higher margin out of it." The business is supplemented by offering technology services like creating and hosting websites. The company offers “newspaper as a service” software, such as cloud-based storage and circulation systems. CherryRoad has sold off at least five newspapers and other kinds of publications to employees while in some instances continuing to provide software support to the new business owners. To cut costs, CherryRoad will move a newly acquired newspaper's office to a cheaper location when the lease ends. As of May 2024, the company has not turned a profit.

=== Printing operations ===
CherryRoad Media owns four newspaper printing presses: the Hutchinson operation in Kansas, Eagle Print in Ohio, the News-Press & Gazette Company commercial printer in Missouri and Page 1 Printers in Minnesota. The printing of the company's papers are done at these sites, or else outsourced to other businesses. As of 2025, only 10 of CherryRoad's papers are printed by a third-party. The company also prints specialty publications at their facilities including magazines for school districts. Due to rising costs and decrease in print demand, CherryRoad began exploring the use of digital printers for print runs less than 1,000 copies.

== History ==
=== Origins ===
In 1983, Michael Gulban started a technology company in New Jersey called DataStudy Inc. The business' name was changed 20 years later to CherryRoad Technologies, which came from the firm's original address. At first, the company was contracted to implement complex software and financial reporting systems, mostly for local government agencies. Over the years it became a shared web hosting service provider that offered cloud computing programs to clients.

Michael Gulban's son Jeremy Gulban, a graduate of Drew University where he majored in economics and minored in political science, took over operations in 2008 after working 10 years in Chicago. After the onset of the COVID-19 pandemic in the United States in 2020, CherryRoad created software applications for virtual meetings and remote learning. The company offered them for free to school districts and local governments, but none were interested. So Jeremy Gulban said the company turned its attention toward using the technology to improve community newspapers.

In November 2020, Jeremy Gulban founded CherryRoad Media with the purchase of the Cook County News-Herald, a weekly newspaper in Grand Marais, Minnesota. The previous owners Hal and Deidre Kettunen had owned the newspaper since 2008.

=== 2021 ===
In June, CherryRoad purchased four weekly newspapers in Arkansas: The Mountaineer Echo of Flippin, the Marshall Mountain Wave, the Clay County Courier in Corning and the Pocahontas Star Herald.

CherryRoad tried to buy the International Falls Journal from Alden Global Capital but the company chose to close the paper instead in June. The paper had been published by the Minnesota-based Red Wing Publishing Co. which Alden acquired in 2020. In response to the closure, CherryRoad launched the Rainy Lake Gazette about three weeks later in July.

The seventh newspaper the company acquired was The Clayton Record in Alabama. The sale was completed in August.

In September, CherryRoad purchased 20 publications from Gannett. The sale included 13 Kanas papers: the Hays Daily News, the Garden City Telegram, the Leavenworth Times, the St. John News, the Kiowa County Signal, the Dodge City Daily Globe, the McPherson Sentinel, the Butler County Times-Gazette, the Wellington Daily News, the Ottawa Times, the Newton Kansan, the Pratt Tribune and the Penny Press in Hiawatha. The Gannet sale also included two newspapers in Nebraska: Nebraska City News-Press and Syracuse Journal-Democrat; four Missouri papers: Independence Examiner, Chillicothe Constitution-Tribune, Boonville Daily News, Linn County Leader; and the Hamburg Reporter in Iowa. The purchase of the newspapers went into effect Oct. 1.

In December, CherryRoad purchased four Colorado newspapers from Gannett: La Junta Tribune-Democrat, the Fowler Tribune, Bent County Democrat and Ag Journal. That same month the CherryRoad Media announced its acquisition of seven rural Minnesota newspapers from Gannett: the Crookston Times, Granite Falls Advocate Tribune, Montevideo American-News, Redwood Falls Gazette, St. James Plaindealer, Sleepy Eye Herald-Dispatch and the Tri-County News in Cottonwood.

=== 2022 ===
In January, CherryRoad founded its second start up newspaper, the Lake County Press, in Lake County, Minnesota.

In February, CherryRoad purchased several Gannett-owned newspapers in Texas and Oklahoma. The Texas newspapers included: Sherman Herald Democrat, Waxahachie Daily Light, Stephenville Empire-Tribune, Brownwood Bulletin, Alice Echo-News Journal, Van Alstyne Leader, Anna-Melissa Tribune, Prosper Press, Grayson County Shopper, Midlothian Mirror, Runnels County Register, Glen Rose Reporter, Cross Timbers Trading Post and Shop Local. The Oklahoma newspapers included: the Daily Ardmoreite in Ardmore and the Shawnee News-Star.

In March, CherryRoad purchased nine newspapers from Rust Communications. The sale included four newspapers in Missouri: Marshall Democrat-News, Monett Times, Cassville Democrat and South Missourian News in Thayer. Also sold were five newspapers in Arkansas: Carroll County News in Berryville, Lovely County Citizen in Eureka Springs, The News in Salem, Villager Journal in Cherokee Village and Clay County Times-Democrat in Piggott.

In September, CherryRoad purchased four weekly papers in Massachusetts from Gannett. The sale included The Landmark in Holden, the Leominster Champion, the Millbury-Sutton Chronicle and The Grafton News. The acquisition averted the planned Sept. 15 closure of The Landmark.

That same month CherryRoad acquired three weekly Utah newspapers from Brehm Communications Inc., including The Richfield Reaper, The Vernal Express and the Uintah Basin Standard. CherryRoad also bought The Chronicle-Express in New York from Gannett, saving the paper from closure.

In November, CherryRoad purchased The McCall Star-News in Idaho from Central Idaho Publishing. That same month CherryRoad purchased The Clinton Item, another Massachusetts paper, from Gannett.

In December, CherryRoad sold several publications it had acquired earlier that year from Rust Communications. The Carroll County News, the free weekly tabloid Lovely County Citizen, shopper Ozark Mountain Trader, and specialty publications Eureka Springs Visitor and Currents magazine were sold to Carroll County Community Media LLC, a partnership between Scott Loftis, David Bell and Steve Johnson. The Cassville Democrat was sold to Kyle Troutman and Jordan Troutman. The Monett Times and Connection Magazine was sold to Lisa Craft.

=== 2023 ===
In February, CherryRoad acquired the McPherson News Ledger and absorbed it into the McPherson Sentinel.

In April, CherryRoad sold The Mountain Echo to Robert Lyons Jr. and Peggy Mason.

In August, CherryRoad purchased several Kansas newspapers from the family owned News-Press & Gazette Company, including the Miami County Republic, the Atchison Globe and the Hiawatha World. The sale also included two papers based in Liberty, Missouri: the Courier-Tribune and the Gladstone Dispatch. CherryRoad also acquired the company's commercial printing facility in St. Joseph, Missouri.

Also in August, CherryRoad acquired the Hutchinson, Kansas, printing operations from Gannett. At the time, the facility printed most of CherryRoad's Kansas publications and other newspapers in the area. That same month, CherryRoad acquired eight community newspapers and Eagle Print from Delphos Herald, Inc. The sale included Ohio papers the Delphos Herald, Van Wert Times Bulletin, the Putnam County Sentinel, the Paulding Progress, the Ada Herald, the Putnam County Vidette, Monroe County Beacon and The Register in Lawrenceburg, Indiana.

In September, the Villager Journal of Cherokee Village and the Salem News, which CherryRoad purchased in February 2021, were merged into a single publication called Areawide News. The Pratt Tribune, Kiowa County Signal and St. John News were merged to form Tri-County Tribune. CherryRoad acquired all three papers in September 2021. Ownership of The Fort Leavenworth Lamp, which was acquired from Gannett in 2021, was transferred to Fort Leavenworth. The AG Journal ceased and the Fowler Tribune was absorbed into the La Junta Tribune Democrat following Gannett closing The Pueblo Chieftain's printing operation. The Anna-Melissa Tribune and Van Alstyne Leader were absorbed into The Herald Democrat.

In October, the company acquired the Moberly Monitor-Index from Westplex Media Group.

=== 2024 ===
In January, CherryRoad purchased Page 1 Printers, a commercial printer based in Slayton, Minnesota, from Graphic Arts Advisors, LLC.

In April, the company announced plans to launch two new Minnesota papers in Hutchinson and Litchfield. This was in response to MediaNews Group announcing the closure of the Hutchinson Leader and Litchfield Independent Review. The newly created Hutchinson Station and Litchfield Rail launched in May.

In June, the company announced The Gardner News in Kansas will close. The weekly newspaper founded in 1982 had been owned by CherryRoad since 2022. The paper had under 200 subscribers and lost money every month. It was the last remaining community newspaper in its county. In July, the Leominster Champion also ceased.

In September, CherryRoad purchased The Savannah Reporter in Savannah, Missouri from the Rosenauer family.

In October, CherryRoad purchased The Linbsborg News-Record from Main Street Media.

In December, CherryRoad acquired eight Missouri newspapers from Lakeway Publishers Inc. The sale included the Centralia Fireside Guard, Elsberry Democrat, Hermann Advertiser Courier, Lincoln County Journal, Lake Gazette in Monroe City, Pike County News, Troy Free Press and Vandalia Leader. That same month, it was announced CherryRoad sometime during the year had become a member of the News Media Alliance.

=== 2025 ===
In February, CherryRoad closed the Crookston Daily Times. The closure came after the company struggled to find workers and the City of Crookston chose to move its legal notices to the Thief River Falls shopper.

In March, the company purchased The Tower News and Cook News-Herald in Minnesota.

In August, the company closed the Ada Herald.Also in August, CherryRoad announced plans to launch The Trenton Telegraph in Missouri. The paper will operate under a community ownership model supported by the Grundy County Industrial Development Corporation. The paper launched in September.

In November, CherryRoad announced a deal to license its content management system called LocalRoad to Ogden Newspapers.

=== 2026 ===
In January, CherryRoad acquired The Carrollton Democrat in Missouri from Main Street Media. In March, the company purchased The Claxton Enterprise. In May, the Daily Chief-Union of Upper Sandusky, Ohio, and The Kenton Times, were acquired. In August, the defunct Bellefontaine Examiner was revived after CherryRoad acquired ownership.

== Publications ==
Newspapers owned by CherryRoad Media
State	Service area	Newspaper	Website
Alabama	Clayton	The Clayton Record	claytonrecord.com
Arkansas	Piggott	Clay County Times-Democrat	cctimesdemocrat.com
Arkansas	Salem	Areawide News	areawidenews.com
Arkansas	Marshall	Marshall Mountain Wave	emountainwave.com
Arkansas	Pocahontas	Pocahontas Star Herald	starheraldnews.com
Arkansas	Corning	Clay County Courier	claycountycourier.com
Colorado	La Junta	Bent County Democrat	bcdemocratonline.com
Colorado	Trinidad	Chronicle News	thechronicle-news.com
Colorado	La Junta	La Junte Tribune-Democrat	lajuntatribunedemocrat.com
Idaho	McCall	The McCall Star-News	mccallstarnews.com
Illinois	Beardstown	Cass County Star-Gazette	beardstownnewspapers.com
Indiana	Lawrenceburg	Register Publications	registerpublications.com
Indiana	Elwood	Tipton County Tribune	tiptoncountytribune.com
Indiana	Elwood	The Call-Leader	elwoodcall-leader.com
Indiana	Elwood	The Alexandria Times-Tribune	alexandriatimes-tribune.com
Iowa	Hamburg	Hamburg Reporter	hamburgreporter.com
Kansas	Pratt	Tri-County Tribune	tricountytribune.news
Kansas	Paola	Miami County Republic	republic-online.com
Kansas	Hiawatha	Hiawatha World	hiawathaworldonline.com
Kansas	Atchison	Atchison Globe	atchisonglobenow.com
Kansas	Gardner	Gardner News	gardnernews.com
Kansas	El Dorado	Butler County Times-Gazette	butlercountytimesgazette.com
Kansas	McPherson	McPherson Sentinel	mcphersonsentinel.com
Kansas	Leavenworth	The Leavenworth Times	leavenworthtimes.com
Kansas	Dodge City	Dodge City Daily Globe	dodgeglobe.com
Kansas	Newton	Newton Kansan	thekansan.com
Kansas	Garden City	Garden City Telegram	gctelegram.com
Kansas	Hays	Hays Daily News	hdnews.net
Kansas	Ottawa	Ottawa Herald	ottawaherald.com
Kansas	Wellington	Wellington Daily News	wellingtondailynews.com
Massachusetts	Clinton	The Clinton Item	clintonitem.com
Massachusetts	Leominster	Leominster Champion	leominsterchamp.com
Massachusetts	Grafton	The Grafton News	thegraftonnews.com
Massachusetts	Millbury	Millbury-Sutton Chronicle	millburysutton.com
Massachusetts	Holden	The Landmark	thelandmark.com
Michigan	Standish	The Arenac County Independent	arenacindependent.com
Michigan	West Branch	The Ogemaw County Herald	ogemawherald.com
Michigan	Mio	The Oscoda County Herald	oscodaherald.com
Minnesota	Hutchinson	Hutchinson Station	hutchinsonstation.com
Minnesota	Litchfield	Litchfield Rail	litchfieldrail.com
Minnesota	International Falls	Rainy Lake Gazette	rainylakegazette.com
Minnesota	Sleepy Eye	Sleepy Eye Herald-Dispatch	sleepyeyenews.com
Minnesota	Grand Marais	Cook County News-Herald	cookcountynews-herald.com
Minnesota	Redwood Falls	Redwood Falls Gazette	redwoodfallsgazette.com
Minnesota	Granite Falls	Granite Falls Advocate-Tribune	granitefallsnews.com
Minnesota	Montevideo	Montevideo American News	montenews.com
Minnesota	Two Harbors	Lake County Press	lakecountypress.news
Minnesota	St. James	St. James Plaindealer	stjamesnews.com
Minnesota	Cottonwood	Tri-County News	tricountynewsmn.com
Minnesota	Crookston	Crookston Times	crookstontimes.com
Missouri	Moberly	Moberly Monitor-Index	moberlymonitor.com
Missouri	St. Joseph	Green Acres Sells	greenacressells.com
Missouri	Liberty	Gladstone Dispatch	gladstonedispatch.com
Missouri	Liberty	Courier-Tribune	mycouriertribune.com
Missouri	Savannah	The Savannah Reporter	savrep.com
Missouri	Salem	South Missourian News	southmissouriannews.com
Missouri	Marshall	Marshall Democrat-News	marshallnews.com
Missouri	Independence	The Examiner	examiner.net
Missouri	Chillicothe	Constitution-Tribune	chillicothenews.com
Missouri	Boonville	Boonville Daily News	boonvilledailynews.com
Missouri	Marceline	Linn County Leader	linncountyleader.com
Nebraska	Nebraska City	Nebraska City News Press	ncnewspress.com
Nebraska	Syracuse	Syracuse Journal-Democrat	journaldemocrat.com
New York	Penn Yan	The Chronicle Express	chronicle-express.com
Oklahoma	Shawnee	Shawnee News Star	news-star.com
Oklahoma	Ardmore	The Daily Ardmoreite	ardmoreite.com
Ohio	Van Wert	Times Bulletin Media	timesbulletin.com
Ohio	Ottawa	The Ada Herald	adaherald.com
Ohio	Ottawa	Putnam County Sentinel	putnamsentinel.com
Ohio	Paulding	Paulding Progress	progressnewspaper.org
Ohio	Delphos	Delphos Herald	delphosherald.com
Ohio	Woodsfield	Monroe County Beacon	mcbeacon.com
Texas	Mineral Wells	Palo Pinto Press	palopintopress.com
Texas	Brownwood	Brownwood Bulletin	brownwoodtx.com
Texas	Glen Rose	Stephenville Empire-Tribune	yourstephenvilletx.com
Texas	Glen Rose	Glen Rose Reporter	yourglenrosetx.com
Texas	Ballinger	Runnels County Register	runnelscountyregister.com
Texas	Waxahachie	Midlothian Mirror	midlothianmirror.com
Texas	Alice	Alice Echo-News Journal	alicetx.com
Texas	Sherman	Herald Democrat	heralddemocrat.com
Texas	Waxahachie	Waxahachie Daily Light	waxahachietx.com
Utah	Vernal	Vernal Express	vernalexpressnews.com
Utah	Roosevelt	Uintah Basin Standard	uintahbasinstandard.com
Utah	Richfield	The Richfield Reaper	richfieldreaper.com
