= Trinidad Chronicle-News =

- Type: Daily newspaper
- Owner: CherryRoad Media
- Founded: 1876
- Language: English
- Headquarters: 313 West Main Street
- City: Trinidad, Colorado
- Country: U.S.
- Website: thechronicle-news.com

The Trinidad Chronicle-News is a daily newspaper in Trinidad, Colorado, United States covering local news, sports, business and community events. It is published Monday through Friday and has an estimated circulation of 3,500. The paper had the first female sports editor in the United States.

== History ==
The newspaper was created by a merger in 1898. The Shearman Company owned the paper for 75 years until selling it in October 2018 to Chronicle-News Media Group, LCC, owned by area residents Julie and Kirk Louden and Kim and Rich Hoffman. Three years later the newspaper was sold again to CherryRoad Media in December 2021.
