= Clarence Edwin Watkins =

Clarence Edwin Watkins (July 1, 1894 – November 13, 1944) was a long term editor of the Chillicothe Constitution-Tribune.

He was born on July 1, 1894, in Chillicothe, Missouri, to James Edward Watkins and Martha Pearl Ireland. He died on November 13, 1944, in Chillicothe, Missouri. He was buried on November 15, 1944, in Edgewood Cemetery.
