= Bellefontaine Examiner =

- Type: Daily newspaper
- Owner: CherryRoad Media
- Founder: Thomas A. Hubbard Sr.
- Founded: 1871
- City: Bellefontaine, Ohio
- Country: United States
- ISSN: 0747-3273
- OCLC number: 10742362
- Website: examiner.org

The Bellefontaine Examiner is a daily newspaper published at Bellefontaine, Ohio, United States. The newspaper covers international and national, regional and local topics, with a focus on stories affecting the surrounding Logan County.

== History ==
In 1871, Thomas A. Hubbard Sr. founded The Weekly Examiner. In 1891, his sons, Edwin “E.O.” Hubbard and Horace “H.K.” Hubbard, founded The Daily Examiner. In 1949, the paper’s name changed to the Bellefontaine Examiner. In December 2025, the paper ceased. The Hubbard family then transferred ownership to CherryRoad Media who relaunched the paper on Aug. 3, 2026.

== History ==
The Examiner is the latest in a series of newspapers which have been published in Bellefontaine:

- Gazette, February 18, 1831-c. 1835
- Bellefontaine Gazette and Logan County Advertiser, January 30, 1836–1836
- Bellefontaine O. Gazette, 1836–1838
- Bellefontaine Gazette, 1838–1840
- Logan Gazette, 1840–1854. William Lawrence served as the editor of this newspaper, 1845–1847.
- Logan County Gazette, 1854–1863. This is the first newspaper published by the Hubbard family.
