= Robert Hugh Miller =

American publisher

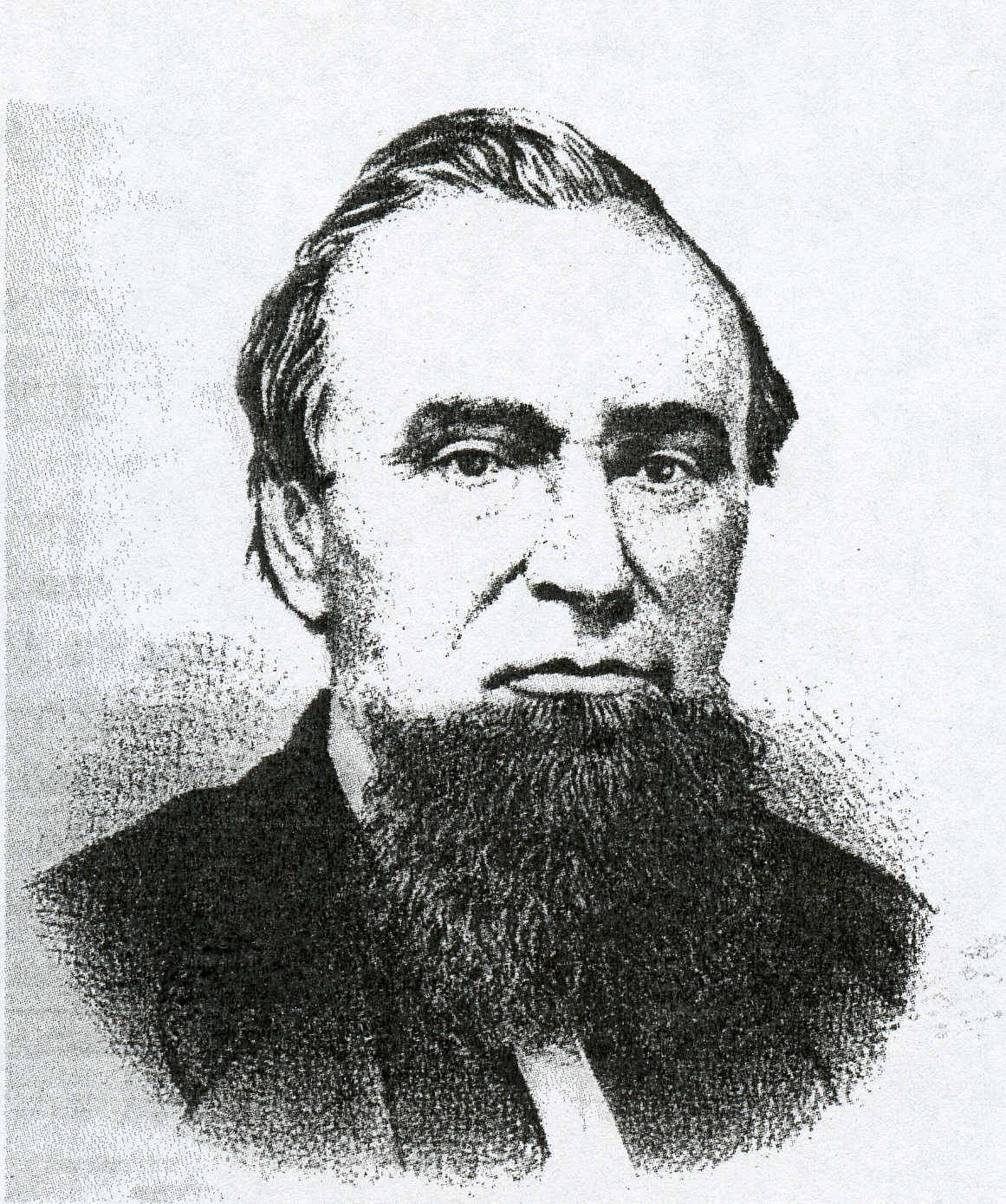
- Miller portrayed in 1877
- Born: November 27, 1826; Richmond, Virginia, U.S.
- Died: February 14, 1911 (aged 84); Liberty, Missouri, U.S.
- Resting place: Fairview Cemetery, Liberty, Missouri
- Occupations: Publisher, journalist, editor
- Political party: Whig
- Spouses: Enfield "Enna" F. Peters (m. 1846; died 1867); Louise "Lulu" Clark Wilson (m. 1871–1911)
- Children: 10

Robert Hugh Miller (November 27, 1826 – February 14, 1911), founder and publisher of the Liberty Tribune, one of the oldest newspapers of continuous publication west of the Mississippi, was born in Richmond, Virginia on November 27, 1826. Miller established the Tribune in 1846 and edited it until 1886.

His family migrated from Virginia to Kentucky when he was six, and to Missouri when he was 12. As a teenager, he was apprenticed, first to the Columbia Patriot, and later to the Missouri Statesman. Encouraged by William Jewell of Columbia, Miller moved to Liberty, Missouri, where he founded the Tribune, which eventually became profitable.

== Early life and education ==
Miller was born in Richmond, Virginia, His parents were John E.Miller, the son of a plantation owner of Scottish descent and Mary A. (Rogers) Miller. The Millers had two children, Robert H, and Edmund, who died in 1859 in Boone County, Missouri Miller's first years were spent on his father's plantation in Albemarle County, Virginia Following the death of his father, in 1838, his mother moved to Glasgow.

His mother remarried after the family moved to Paris, Missouri, where his mother taught school. In 1840, aged 14, Miller was apprenticed to the printer's trade in the office of the Patriot, a newspaper published at Columbia, Missouri. When that paper folded, Miller joined the Statesman, where he gained further experience in the printing industry.

== Marriage and Family ==
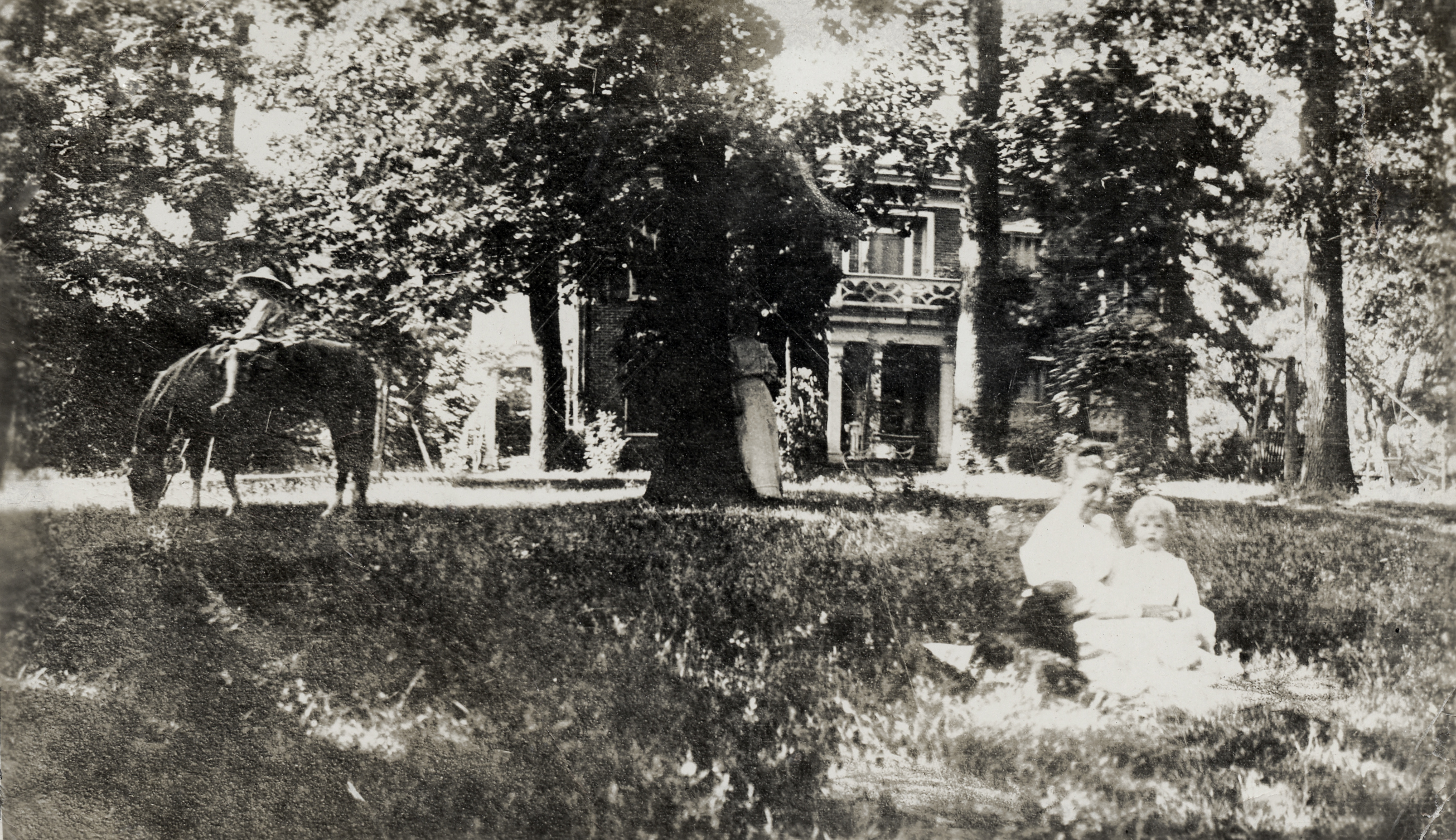
Mrs. Robert Hugh Miller (Louise Wilson) at Forest Hill with granddaughter Catherine Day in foreground and grandson Roger Owen Day on horse. c. 1906

Miller had four children with his first wife and five children with his second wife,

== Career ==
The Tribune was started as a Whig paper, until the party's demise in the US presidential election of 1852. From 1860 it then expressed the viewpoint of the Democratic party for the duration of his tenure. Miller became friends with William Rockhill Nelson, founder of the Kansas City Star, who offered to buy the Tribune. Miller later said he didn't want to sell at the time because he "didn't realize he was getting old". Miller eventually sold the Tribune to John Dougherty in 1885. Miller died on February 14, 1911.
