= The Kenton Times =

Kenton Times
- Type: Daily newspaper
- Owner: CherryRoad Media
- Publisher: C.E. Flanagan
- Founded: 1953
- Headquarters: 201 E Columbus St, Kenton, Ohio 43326
- Circulation: 6,700
- OCLC number: 10112155
- Website: www.kentontimes.com

The Kenton Times is a daily newspaper founded and based in Hardin County, Ohio. It is owned by CherryRoad Media.

== Ownership ==
The Kenton Times is the consolidation of the Kenton Daily Democrat and the Kenton News and Republican. The two papers merged in 1953 when Ray Barnes purchased the Daily Democrat from C. E. Flanagan and the News and Republican from Edwin S. Rutledge. In November 1953, The Kenton Times began publishing from the former plant of the Daily Democrat.

In May 2026, the Barnes family sold the Times and the Daily Chief-Union of Upper Sandusky, Ohio, to CherryRoad Media.
