= Nebraska City News-Press =

Weekly newspaper in Nebraska City, Nebraska, United States

- Type: Weekly newspaper
- Owner(s): CherryRoad Media
- Founder(s): Thomas Morton
- Editor: Kirt Manion
- Founded: 1854
- Language: English
- Headquarters: 109 S 9th Street - P.O. Box 757; Nebraska City, NE 68410-0757; USA
- Circulation: 1,106
- OCLC number: 32441202
- Website: ncnewspress.com

The Nebraska City News-Press is the oldest newspaper in Nebraska. The paper is published once a week on Fridays in Nebraska City, Nebraska, the county seat of Otoe County.

== History ==
=== Nebraska City News ===
Thomas Morton was born in Wales in 1829 and immigrated to Ohio with his parents as a child. He made his living in the printing trade and in May 1854 was employed at a small newspaper in St. Mary, Iowa. Around that time Morton pitched the idea of launching a newspaper called the Platte Valley Advertiser for people living nearby across the Missouri River in the Nebraska Territory. Before launching, Morton merged his paper with another that had recently started called the Gazette. The newly formed Nebraska Palladium was first published on July 15, 1854.

The paper was printed in Iowa by Washington hand press. The business later moved to Bellevue and printed the first issue of the Nebraska Palladium & Platte Valley Advocate on November 18, 1854. The masthead listed Morton as editor and the owners as D. E. Reed and J. M. Latham. When Bellevue was not named territorial capital as expected, Morton moved the paper to Nebraska City and renamed it to the Nebraska City News. Julius Sterling Morton was hired as the paper's first editor after the relocation. Despite sharing the same last name, the two men were unrelated. Sterling Morton wrote editorials that were staunchly Democratic for the paper which acted as the party's mouthpiece in the territory. One day horsemen led by Jim Lane visited him and threatened to destroy his printing plant if he did not stop attacking abolitionists. On May 12, 1860, a fire destroyed most of the city's downtown district, including the News' plant. In March 1887, the News became owned Thomas Morton's nephew C. H. Hubner and E. D. Marnell. Thomas Morton died about five months later on August 10, 1887.

=== Nebraska City Press ===
The People's Press was first published in Nebraska City on Nov. 25, 1858. It was founded by Charles W. Sherfey. He was a Harvard Law School graduate who had previously established the Platte Valley Times in Plattsmouth a year before. Sherfey soon sold the Press after a few weeks to Orasmus H. Irish and L. L. Survey. Survey died around the time their first issue was published and Irish sold the paper in 1860 to Alfred Mathias and Joseph E. LaMaster. A year later the paper was owned by W. H. H. Waters and Royal Buck, who changed the name to the Press and Herald. Buck sold out in 1862 and the name was changed back to the People's Press. In 1864, D. J. McCann purchased the paper. A year later the paper was operated by W. H. Miller who sold it back to Irish in 1863. Three years later the name was changed to the Nebraska City Press. In 1868, Miller and S. B. Price became co-owners and Irish withdrew later that year, replaced by Thomas McCulloch. Miller became the sole-owner by 1870. The paper was temporarily suspended but relaunched by John Roberts and W. A. Brown as the Chronicle and Press. Roberts soon dropped out and the name was changed to the Press again. Alfred G. Fairbrother became the proprietor in 1884. E. A. Brown operated the paper for 26 years until selling it to Frank Olmsted in 1907.

=== Merger ===
On November 6, 1925, C. H. Hubner and E. D. Marnell sold the Nebraska City News to Earl M. Marvin, owner of the Beatrice Daily Sun. Ten minutes after signing the deal, Marvin sold the paper again to John Hyde Sweet, owner of the Nebraska City Daily Press. The two papers were then merged to form the Nebraska City News-Press. Upon J. Hyde Sweet's death in 1964, the paper was inherited by his son Arthur Sweet. In 1975, he retired and sold the paper to Roy H. Park, owner of Park Newspapers, Inc. Park sold the paper in 1993 to American Publishing Co., a subsidiary of Hollinger Inc. Hollinger sold the paper to Liberty Group Publishing in 1999. The company was bought in 2005 and then renamed to Gatehouse Media, which merged with Gannett in 2019. In September 2021, Gannett sold the Nebraska City News-Press to CherryRoad Media. The newspaper announced on April 20, 2023, that it would add a paywall to its website starting that May.

== See also ==
- List of newspapers in Nebraska
- List of newspapers owned by GateHouse Media
