= The Wellington Daily News =

American newspaper

- Type: Daily newspaper
- Owner: CherryRoad Media
- Publisher: Jeremy Gulban
- Founded: September 2, 1901
- Headquarters: 214 South Washington Avenue; Wellington, Kansas 67152 United States
- Circulation: 2,051
- OCLC number: 12686472
- Website: wellingtondailynews.com

The Wellington Daily News is an American daily newspaper published in Wellington, Kansas. It is owned by CherryRoad Media.

The paper covers the city of Wellington and Sumner County, Kansas, part of the Wichita metropolitan area.

It is one of several newspapers CherryRoad Media owns in the Wichita metropolitan area, including the dailies The Butler County Times-Gazette and The Newton Kansan.
