= Ada Herald =

Local weekly newspaper based in Ada, Ohio

- Type: Weekly newspaper
- Format: Broadsheet
- Owner: CherryRoad Media
- Editor: Steven Coburn-Griffi
- Founded: 1885
- Ceased publication: 2025
- Headquarters: 229 N Main St, Ada, Hardin County, Ohio 45810
- OCLC number: 16701983
- Website: adaherald.com

The Ada Herald was an Ohio weekly newspaper covering Hardin County and parts of Allen and Hancock counties.

== History & Ownership ==
Starting in June 1885, U.S.G. Cherry, S.B. Wagner, and W.W. Poultney, graduates of Ohio Normal University, started publishing a "monthly review of the school and societies" from the office of the local newspaper, the Ada Record. It was intended to keep alumni of Ohio Normal University up-to-date on university happenings. The publication grew in popularity and became known as the University Herald. M.L. Snyder and Ralph Parlette bought the Herald in 1895 and changed its name to the Ada Herald in 1916.

Barton Snyder, son of M. L. Snyder, sold the paper to Brown Publishing Co. in 1966. When the Brown Publishing Co. went bankrupt in 2010 the Ada Herald as well as the Van Wert Times Bulletin were purchased for $3.6 million by Delphos Herald Inc. In August 2023, Delphos Herald, Inc. sold the newspaper to CherryRoad Media. In 2025, CherryRoad Media closed the paper.
