= Alexandria Times-Tribune =

Weekly Wednesday newspaper

- Type: Weekly newspaper
- Format: Broadsheet
- Owner(s): CherryRoad Media
- Publisher: David Keller
- Managing editor: Jenny Renbarger
- Founded: 1992
- Political alignment: Independent
- Language: English
- Headquarters: Elwood Publishing Company
- City: Elwood, Indiana
- Country: United States
- Circulation: 1,850 copies
- Sister newspapers: The Call Leader, The Tipton County Tribune
- ISSN: 1063-553X
- OCLC number: 26061144
- Website: www.elwoodpublishing.com/alexandria-times-tribune-contact-us/

The Alexandria Times-Tribune is a weekly newspaper in Elwood, Indiana, United States. The paper has a paid circulation of approximately 1,850 and an on-line edition. It covers the Anderson, Indiana Metropolitan Statistical Area .

The Times-Tribune focuses on community news, sports, businesses, and community events.

The Times-Tribune was formed in 1903 by merging The Alexandria Times and The Alexandria Tribune. In 1907, the Times Tribune was sold to Robert M. Yelvington. Upon its new ownership, the Times-Tribune became politically independent.

Over the years, the Times-Tribune underwent several changes of ownership. in the early 1970s, it was sold to Elwood Publishing Company.

== History ==
In 1903, the Times-Tribune was formed by the merger of the Alexandria Times and the Alexandria Tribune. The Tribune had been started by W. E French and his brother, Thomas N French, in 1898. This Pro-Republican paper had both a daily and a weekly edition.

The Times-Tribune was owned by the Times-Tribune Company, headed by Joseph Bronnerman, F.C. Headington, Thomas N French, J.F. Merker, and Art G French. Otho F. Line served as the editor and business manager. The new paper politically aligned with the Republican Party and was published on a daily basis.

In 1905, Headington bought out the French brothers. In September 1906, Line resigned as editor and manager and was replaced by Thomas French.

In late 1906 or early 1907, Chris Myer purchased the Times-Tribune then sold it in October 1907 to Robert M. Yelvington. Yelvington then decided to make the paper become politically independent. In April 1913, Yelvington sold the paper to William F. Baum, but stayed on as the editor. In 1925, Baum sold the Times-Tribune to Deloss Arnold, who sold it in January 1934 to Richard Emschwiller. Emshiller appointed Yelvington to again serve as editor.

Emshwiller died on November 6, 1941, passing the Times-Tribune to his daughter, Ruth Emshwiller (later Ruth Durham). On July 5, 1946, Yelvington died and Durham sold the paper to Parker Likely and Fred A. Likely Jr. They named Shirell Fox as the editor. The pair only owned the Times-Tribune for 1 month until selling it to the Times-Tribune Corporation which consisted of Robert M. Feemster, Allison M. Feemster, and David M. Feemster. The new owners name A. J. Ballinger as editor and manager. Shirell Fox replaced Ballinger in June 1947. The following year (1948) Fox was succeeded by Blanch Russel.

In 1957, Darrell L. “Bud” Zink was named as manager and editor. He purchased the Times-Tribune from the Feemsters around 1962. In January 1969 the paper went from daily to weekly publication.

In the early 1970s, the Times-Tribune was sold to the Elwood Publishing Company, which was headed by Ray Barnes, and Curtis Ellis was named as the editor and general manager of the paper. Jan Connors replaced Ellis as the editor in 1976, and Jack Barnes took over as the publisher. Around this time Jack Armstrong was named as general manager. Barnes, Connors, and Armstrong held their positions into the 1980s.

The Barnes family now owns the Times-Tribune.
