= The McCall Star-News =

Weekly newspaper published in McCall, Idaho

The Star-News
- Type: Weekly newspaper
- Owner: CherryRoad Media
- Founder: Marcus A. Bates
- Editor: Max Silverson
- Founded: 1918 (as Payette Lakes Star)
- Language: English
- Headquarters: 1000 1st St, McCall, ID 83638
- Website: mccallstarnews.com

The McCall Star-News is a weekly newspaper published in McCall, Idaho. It is owned by CherryRoad Media.

== History ==
Marcus "Mark" Ayres Bates worked at a newspaper in Caldwell before launching the Parma Herald in 1903 in Parma. In 1915, Richard Ralph Womack moved to Cascade, Idaho and launched a weekly newspaper called the Cascade News. The printing plant was manufactured in Portland, Oregon. Two years later Womack sold the News to Burt Venable. In 1918, Bates relocated his Parma print shop to McCall and then launched the Payette Lake Star.

In 1921, Venable sold the News to Ray E. Coleman. Bates suspended the Star in 1925 due to a lack of patronage. A few months later, a stock company was set up to run the Star and allow Bates to retire. In 1933, former Star publisher J.C. Allen died from lead poisoning, which he contracted while working on the Payette paper.

In 1934, the Star was sold at auction by Valley County sheriff R.L. Wilson for delinquent taxes to the paper's editor, W.C. Peer. In 1937, Coleman retired and sold the News to Gordon Squires, who previously operated the Power County Booster in American Falls. A year later Squires acquired the Star from Peer. Squires published both papers until his death in 1962. His widow Doris Squired then sold the News and Star to Don McMahan of Council and Glen Youngblood of Cascade.

At some point, Youngblood exited the business and the two papers were merged to form The Star-News. Jan and Bob McMahan sold the paper in 1977 to Michael D. Parfit. At that time the paper had a circulation of 2,500. Two years later the Parfits sold the Star-News to A.L. "Butch" Alford Jr., publisher of the Lewiston Morning Tribune, and Tribune business manager Bill Brigs. CherryRoad Media acquired the Star-News from them in 2022.
