= Alice Echo-News Journal =

Newspaper based in Alice, Texas

- Type: Daily newspaper
- Format: Tabloid
- Owner: CherryRoad Media
- Publisher: Jeremy Gulban
- Editor: Melissa Trevino
- Founded: 1894
- Language: English
- Headquarters: 405 E. Main Street, Alice, Texas United States
- Circulation: 493 (as of 2023)
- OCLC number: 13913080
- Website: Official website

Alice Echo-News Journal is a newspaper based in Alice, Texas, covering the Jim Wells County area of South Texas and published Wednesday, Friday and Sunday.

== History ==
D.S. Boother founded the Alice Echo in 1894, publishing it as a weekly. He sold to a group headed by publisher Kenneth Fellows in 1935, which sold to V.D. Ringwald three years later. Ringwald made the paper a daily in 1946, changing the name to the Alice Daily Echo.

Gulf Enterprises bought the newspaper in 1966, installing Lowell P. Hunt as publisher. The next year, the owners bought the weekly Alice News and renamed the product the Alice Echo-News. The owners of a newspaper chain headed by the Brownwood Bulletin (Woodson Newspapers Inc.) bought the newspaper in 1975, with co-ownership by Brownwood's Craig Woodson and Hunt.

The Echo-News was bought by Boone Newspapers in 1990 and American Consolidated Media in 2000. ACM bought the free semiweekly Alice Journal in 2002 and renamed the paper the Alice Echo-News Journal.

In 2010, the paper switched to a tabloid format and reduced its output to three days a week (Wednesday, Friday, Sunday). It also changed its printing schedule from afternoons to mornings.

In 2014, ACM sold its Texas and Oklahoma newspapers to New Media Investment Group.

Gannett sold the paper, along with 16 others to CherryRoad Media in February 2022.

== Awards ==
Echo reporter Caro Brown won the Pulitzer Prize for Local Reporting, Edition Time in 1955 for coverage of the "one-man political rule" of George Berham Parr in neighboring Duval County. The Pulitzer judges praised her story, "written under unusual pressure both of edition time and difficult, even dangerous, circumstances."
