= Cheboygan Daily Tribune =

Newspaper in Cheboygan, Michigan, US

- Type: Daily newspaper
- Format: Broadsheet
- Owner: USA Today Co.
- Publisher: None
- Editor: Sarah Leach
- Founded: c. 1876
- Headquarters: 308 North Main St., Cheboygan, MI 49721, United States
- Circulation: 1,400 (as of 2022)
- ISSN: 0746-665X
- Website: cheboygannews.com

The Cheboygan Daily Tribune is a daily newspaper published Tuesdays through Saturdays in Cheboygan, Michigan, United States. It is owned by USA Today Co.

In addition to the daily newspaper, Gannett also publishes the Shopper's Fair pennysaver and Mackinac Journal, the "magazine of the straits". The magazine is distributed bimonthly in Charlevoix, Cheboygan, Emmet, Mackinac, Otsego and Presque Isle counties.

The Tribune and Shopper's Fair circulate primarily in Cheboygan, Emmet and Presque Isle counties, including Indian River, Levering, Mackinaw City and Onaway.

Founded in the 1870s, the Tribune began daily publication in the 1910s.
