= William Lawrence (Ohio Republican) =

American politician (1819–1899)

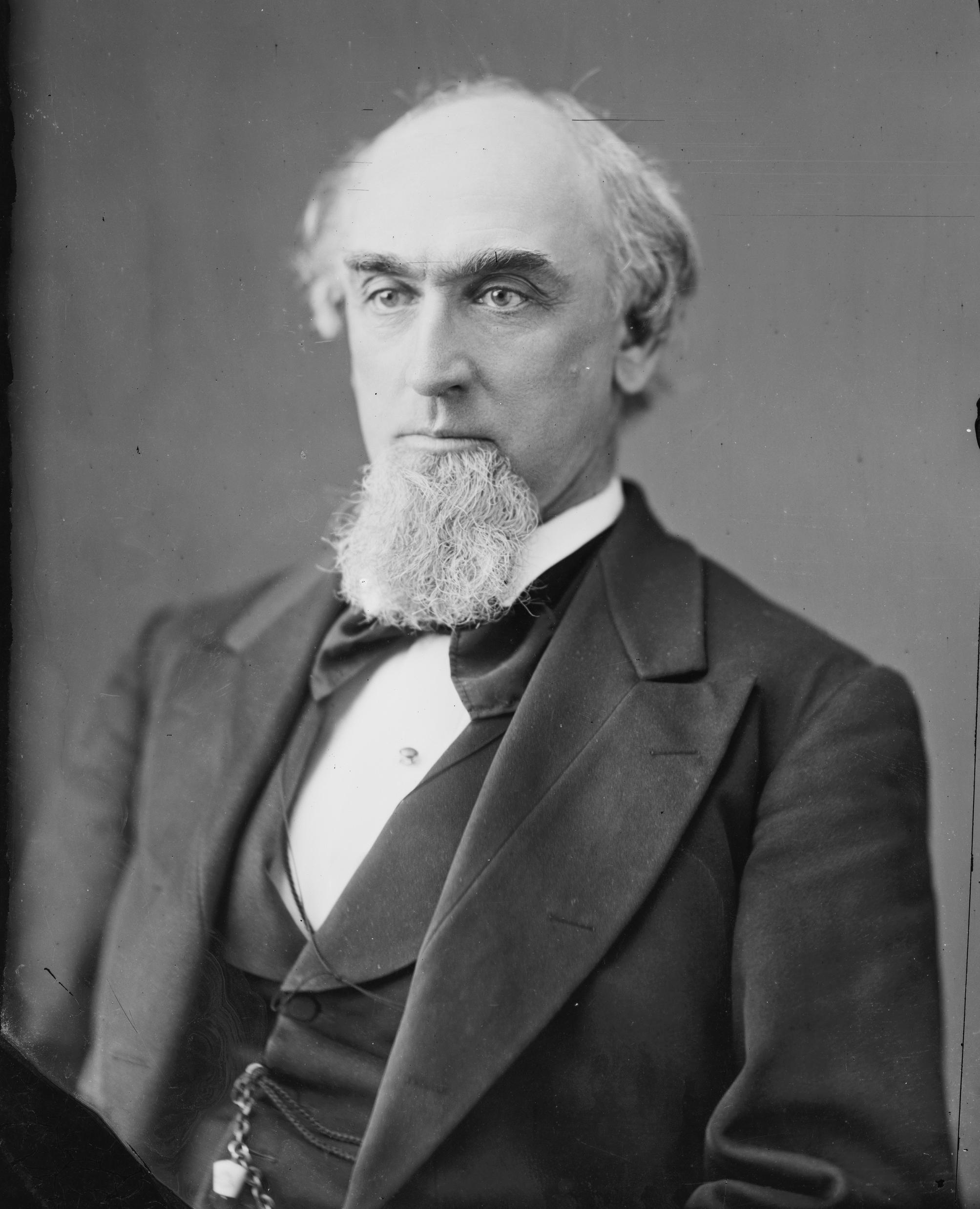

First Comptroller of the Treasury
- In office 1880–1885
- Appointed by: Rutherford B. Hayes

Member of the U.S. House of Representatives from Ohio
- In office March 4, 1873 – March 3, 1877
- Preceded by: John Beatty
- Succeeded by: J. Warren Keifer
- Constituency: 8th district
- In office March 4, 1865 – March 3, 1871
- Preceded by: John Franklin McKinney
- Succeeded by: John Franklin McKinney
- Constituency: 4th district

Judge of the Ohio Third District Court
- In office 1857–1864

Judge of the Union County Court of Common Pleas
- In office 1856–1865
- Preceded by: Benjamin F. Metcalf
- Succeeded by: Jacob S. Conklin

Member of the Ohio Senate from the 13th district
- In office January 2, 1854 – January 6, 1856
- Preceded by: John J. Williams
- Succeeded by: Cornelius S. Hamilton

Member of the Ohio Senate from Logan County and other counties
- In office December 3, 1849 – January 4, 1852
- Preceded by: Joshua Judy
- Succeeded by: John J. Williams

Member of the Ohio House of Representatives from Hardin County and Logan County
- In office December 7, 1846 – December 3, 1848
- Preceded by: Richard S. Canby
- Succeeded by: Samuel Watt

Logan County Prosecutor
- In office 1845

Personal details
- Born: June 26, 1819 Mount Pleasant, Ohio, U.S.
- Died: May 8, 1899 (aged 79) Kenton, Ohio, U.S.
- Resting place: Bellefontaine Cemetery, Bellefontaine, Ohio, U.S.
- Party: Republican
- Education: Franklin College; Cincinnati Law School
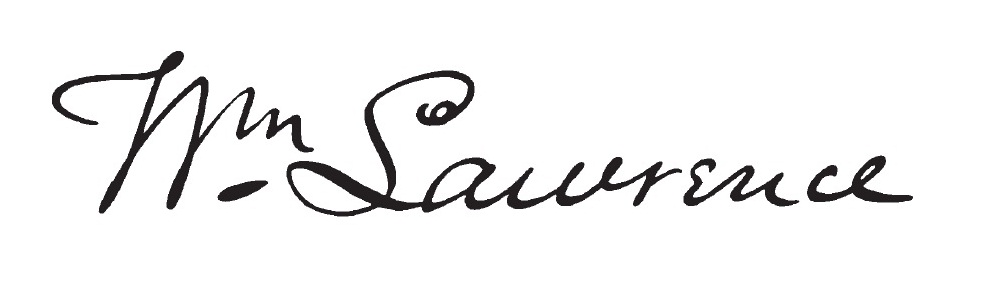
- Signature

William Lawrence (June 26, 1819 – May 8, 1899) was a Republican lawyer and politician from Ohio. He was most noted for being a US Representative influential in attempting to impeach President Andrew Johnson, creating the United States Department of Justice, helping to create the American Red Cross, and ratifying the Geneva Convention.

== Early life and education ==
Lawrence was born on June 26, 1819, in Mount Pleasant, Ohio. He attended Tidball's Academy in Knoxville, Tennessee. After teaching at Pennsville and McConnelsville, Ohio, he was graduated in 1838 from Franklin College in New Athens, Ohio. He was then graduated in 1840 from law school at the University of Cincinnati, and was admitted to the bar. In 1873, Lawrence was awarded the LL. D. from Franklin College.

== Early career ==
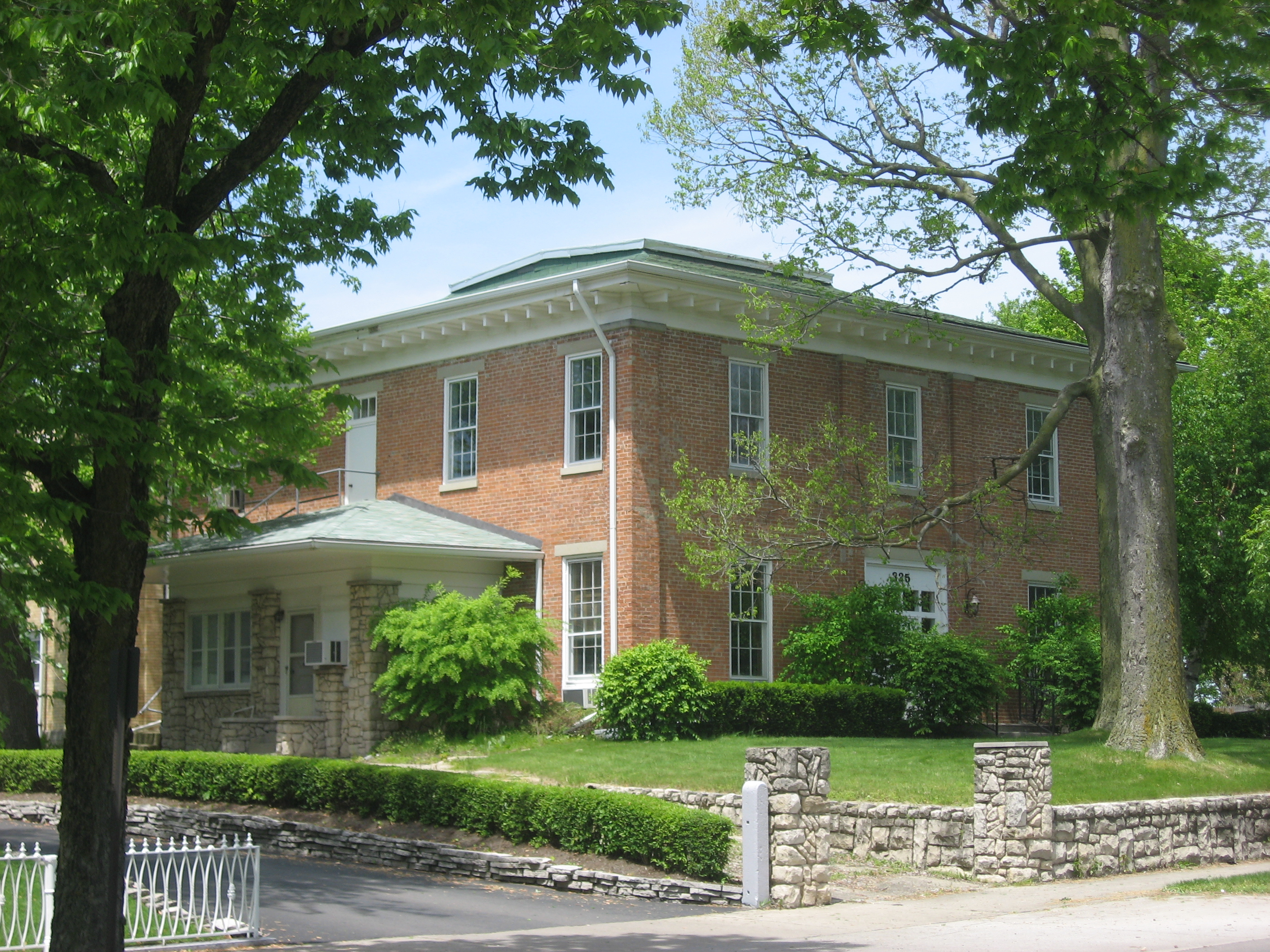
Lawrence's house in Bellefontaine, now listed on the National Register of Historic Places

In 1841, Lawrence moved to Bellefontaine, Ohio, and there set up his law practice. From July 15, 1841, to July 15, 1843, he was law partner of Benjamin Stanton, and from July, 1851 to February, 1854 with his law student William H. West. From 1841 to 1843, he continued his studies, then in the field of medicine. In 1842, he became the Commissioner of Bankruptcy for Logan County.

From 1845 to 1847, Lawrence served as the editor of the Logan Gazette, which later became the Bellefontaine Examiner.

Lawrence was elected and served as the Logan County Prosecutor in 1845.

== Ohio House of Representatives and Ohio Senate ==
He also served as a member of the Ohio House of Representatives, in 1846 and 1847. In 1849, Lawrence was first elected to the Ohio Senate, serving until 1851 when he became the reporter of the Ohio Supreme Court. He returned to the Ohio Senate in 1854. He also served as an editor of Western Law Monthly from 1859 to 1862. In 1860 or 1861, Lawrence built a house along North Main Street in Bellefontaine; today, the William Lawrence House remains largely intact and is listed on the National Register of Historic Places.

== Judgeships and Civil War service ==
Lawrence was appointed a judge of the Union County Court of Common Pleas.

Lawrence was also appointed a judge of the Third District Court in 1857, serving until 1865, resigning to serve in the United States Congress.

In 1862, Lawrence entered the Union Army as colonel of the 84th Ohio Infantry, a three-month regiment. In 1863, Lawrence was appointed to serve as the wartime judge for the United States district court in Florida; however, he declined the appointment.

== United States House of Representatives ==
On March 4, 1865, William Lawrence took office as the U.S. representative from Ohio's 4th congressional district, having been elected to this office the previous November. Lawrence first served three consecutive terms in the Thirty-ninth, Fortieth, and Forty-first Congresses, ending his third term on March 3, 1871. He returned to Congress in 1873, this time representing Ohio's 8th congressional district. Lawrence served two terms in the Forty-third and Forty-fourth Congresses, completing his fifth overall and final term on March 3, 1877.

Lawrence supported the adoption of the Fifteenth Amendment to the United States Constitution, stating in an 1866 speech that it would "protect every citizen, including the millions of people of foreign birth who will flock to our shores to become citizens and to find here a land of liberty and law."

In 1866, Lawrence introduced a bill creating the Territory of Lincoln from the land that is now Oklahoma. (This is not to be confused with the State of Lincoln proposal made in 1869 for southern Texas, nor the Lincoln proposed for the Pacific Northwest.) Lawrence reintroduced the bill in 1867. The proposal was that all territorial officers and voters would initially be “American citizens of African descent,” and the territorial legislature could later choose to change eligibility. However, neither bill got out of committee.

Lawrence was a supporter of impeaching President Andrew Johnson. He served on the House Judiciary Committee at the time it was conducting the first impeachment inquiry against Andrew Johnson, and voted in support of the committee sending an impeachment resolution to the full House in 1867. He thereafter voted for the unsuccessful 1867 impeachment resolution when it was voted on by the full House. In March 1868, he again voted to impeach Johnson when the House successfully passed a resolution impeaching Johnson.

In the gap between his third and fourth terms in the House, the returned to Bellefontaine in 1871 and founded the Bellefontaine National Bank (acquired by Huntington National Bank in 1977), serving as its first president.

He returned to Congress in 1873, this representing Ohio's 8th Congressional district. Lawrence left Congress again on March 3, 1877. During his second stretch in the House service, Lawrence was the chairman of the Committee on War Claims arising from the American Civil War.

=== Creation of the Department of Justice ===
In 1867, as a member of the House Judiciary Committee, Lawrence directed an inquiry into the creation of a "law department" headed by the Attorney General and composed of the various department solicitors and district attorneys. On February 19, 1868, Lawrence authored the bill that ultimately created the United States Department of Justice. However, this first bill died in Congress due to the Congress's (and Lawrence's) concern with the impeachment of President Johnson.

In the following Congress, the issue was brought back to the table. Representative Thomas Jenckes of Rhode Island introduced a bill to create the Department of Justice on February 25, 1870. Though Lawrence did not write this bill, it incorporated many of the ideas from Lawrence's previous bill, and he gave the bill his full support. On June 22, 1870, President Ulysses Grant signed this second bill into law, creating the Department of Justice.

== First Comptroller of the Treasury, American Red Cross, and Ratification of the Geneva Convention ==
Lawrence was appointed by President Rutherford B Hayes in 1880 to serve as the First Comptroller of the Treasury, a post he held until 1885. Lawrence then appealed on behalf of Clara Barton to Hayes' successor, James Garfield, to support the creation of the American Red Cross on May 21, 1881. He then served as the organization's first Vice President. Lawrence and Barton were also instrumental in persuading the United States to ratify the Geneva Convention in 1882.

== Later life and death ==
In 1891, Lawrence was appointed President of the National Wool Growers Association. He died on May 8, 1899, in Kenton, Ohio. Lawrence is interred at Bellefontaine Cemetery in Bellefontaine, Ohio. The small Ohio community of Lawrenceville is named for him.

U.S. House of Representatives
Preceded by John Franklin McKinney	United States Representative from Ohio's 4th congressional district March 4, 1865-March 3, 1871	Succeeded by John Franklin McKinney
Preceded by John Beatty	United States Representative from Ohio's 8th congressional district March 4, 1873-March 3, 1877	Succeeded by J. Warren Keifer
Ohio House of Representatives
Preceded by Richard S. Canby	Representative from Hardin & Logan County; December 7, 1846-December 3, 1848	Succeeded by Samuel Watt
Ohio Senate
Preceded by Joshua Judy	Senator from Logan & other counties December 3, 1849-January 4, 1852	Succeeded by John J. Williams
Preceded by John J. Williams	Senator from 13th District; January 2, 1854-January 6, 1856	Succeeded by Cornelius S. Hamilton
