= McPherson Sentinel =

Daily newspaper in McPherson, Kansas

- Type: Daily newspaper
- Owner: CherryRoad Media
- Editor: Jeffrey Gulley
- Founded: 1887, as The McPherson Daily Republican
- Headquarters: 116 South Main Street, McPherson, Kansas 67460, United States
- Circulation: 2,538
- OCLC number: 11870413
- Website: McPhersonSentinel.com

The McPherson Sentinel is an American daily newspaper published in McPherson, Kansas, United States.

The paper covers several communities in McPherson County, Kansas, including McPherson, Canton, Galva, Inman, Lindsborg, Marquette and Moundridge.

== History ==
The newspaper began publication in 1887 under the title The McPherson Daily Republican and in 1959 changed to its current name.

In 2021, Gannett sold the paper to CherryRoad Media. In 2023 CherryRoad acquired the McPherson News Ledger and absorbed it into the McPherson Sentinel.

== See also ==
- List of newspapers in Kansas
