= Courier-Tribune (Liberty, Missouri) =

Newspaper in Liberty, Missouri

- Type: Weekly newspaper
- Owner: CherryRoad Media
- Founder: Robert Hugh Miller
- Founded: April 1846 (as Liberty Tribune)
- Language: English
- Headquarters: 104 N. Main Street
- City: Liberty, Missouri
- Sister newspapers: Gladstone Dispatch
- Website: mycouriertribune.com

Courier-Tribune is a weekly newspaper in Liberty, Missouri.

== History ==
Courier-Tribune traces its earliest roots back to the Liberty Tribune, known colloquially as the "Lib Trib", founded in April 1846 by Robert Hugh Miller. Miller, who was 19 years old at the time, used a loan of $5,000 to start the paper. The paper was founded as a Whig newspaper. Miller ran the newspaper for 40 years.

The Liberty Tribune was originally published as The Weekly Tribune between April 4, 1846, and July 9, 1852, but changed its name to Liberty Weekly Tribune beginning with the July 16, 1852 issue. The name was again changed in 1860 to The Liberty Tribune beginning with the August 17, 1860 issue.

From 1890 to 1929, the paper was published by owner, editor and publisher Irving Gilmer. For a short time, during the Spanish–American War in 1898, the Liberty Tribune was published daily.

In February 2017, the Liberty Tribune merged with sister publications The Kearney Courier and The Smithville Herald to form the Courier-Tribune. The consolidated weekly newspaper was owned by St. Joseph-based News-Press & Gazette Company. At the time of its merger, the Liberty Tribune was the longest continuous weekly newspaper being published in Missouri under the same name.

In August 2023, the Courier-Tribune was sold to CherryRoad Media.

== Archive ==
The Missouri Digital Heritage Collection, hosted by the Missouri Secretary of State, currently includes scanned copies of the Liberty Tribune from 1846 to 1848, 1852–1867, 1869–1878, 1880, 1882, and 1883.
