= Dodge City Daily Globe =

Newspaper in Dodge City, Kansas

- Type: Daily newspaper
- Format: Broadsheet
- Owner: CherryRoad Media
- Publisher: Dena Sattler
- Editor: Vincent Marshall
- Founded: 1878, as Ford County Globe
- Headquarters: 705 Second Avenue, Dodge City, Kansas 67801, United States
- Circulation: 2,149
- ISSN: 0889-3489
- Website: DodgeGlobe.com

The Dodge City Daily Globe is a daily newspaper based in Dodge City, Kansas, United States, and owned by CherryRoad Media.

== History ==
The paper was founded in 1878 as the Ford County Globe. It was retitled as the Globe Live Stock Journal in 1884, and merged with the Ford County Republican in 1889 to become the Globe-Republican.

Jess C. Denious (b. July 14, 1879, d. Dec. 1, 1953) acquired the paper in 1910 and changed the name to the Daily Globe. He remained as publisher until his death in 1953. Denious also served in the Kansas Senate (1933–40) and as the 29th Lieutenant Governor of Kansas from 1943 to 1947. The paper remained in the family until July 1988, when it was sold to Stauffer Communications (of Topeka, Kansas). Martha E. Muncy (daughter of J.C. and Juilet Denious), who had served as publisher since 1973, retired at the time of the sale.

In 1994, Morris Communications acquired Stauffer, which was then operating 20 daily newspapers (including the Daily Globe) and eight weeklies, in addition to a number of television and radio stations. In 2007, GateHouse Media acquired the paper from Morris Publishing Group as part of a larger sale of papers. The company later merged with Gannett, who sold the paper in 2021 to CherryRoad Media.

== See also ==
- List of newspapers in Kansas
