= Crookston Daily Times =

Newspaper in Polk County, Minnesota, US

Coordinates: 47.773425°N 96.607686°W

- Type: Weekly newspaper
- Owner: CherryRoad Media
- Publisher: Jeremy Gulban
- Editor: Jess Bengtson
- Founded: November 25, 1891
- Ceased publication: February 7, 2025
- Language: American English
- Headquarters: 124 South Broadway, Crookston, Minnesota 56716, United States
- City: Crookston
- Country: United States
- Circulation: 566 (as of 2024)
- OCLC number: 1565488
- Website: crookstontimes.com

The Crookston Daily Times was a weekly newspaper published in Crookston, Minnesota. It was owned by CherryRoad Media. The newspaper covered Crookston and Polk County, Minnesota, and was one of two daily newspapers published in the Greater Grand Forks metropolitan area. The Crookston Daily Times in 2009 was the smallest daily newspaper in Minnesota, and one of the smallest daily newspapers in the United States at that time.

== History ==
The Crookston Daily Times was founded in 1891. Gannett sold the paper to CherryRoad Media in December 2021. The Times published its final issue on February 7, 2025. The closure came after the company struggled to find permanent staff. It had two reporters when CherryRoad took over, but they had left in 2023. With no freelancers, it had relied on local residents sending in material. Eventually, the City of Crookston chose to move its legal notices to the Thief River Falls shopper.
