= Marshall Democrat-News =

Newspaper in Marshall, Missouri

The Marshall Democrat News
- Type: Daily newspaper
- Owner: CherryRoad Media
- Publisher: Shelly Arth
- Editor: Eric Crump
- Headquarters: 121 N. Lafayette; Marshall, MO 65340; USA
- Circulation: 3,063
- Website: marshallnews.com

The Marshall Democrat-News is a local newspaper published in Marshall, Missouri, serving Saline County. The paper is published Monday through Friday and reports a circulation of 3,063.
