= Kirksville Daily Express =

Newspaper in Missouri, United States

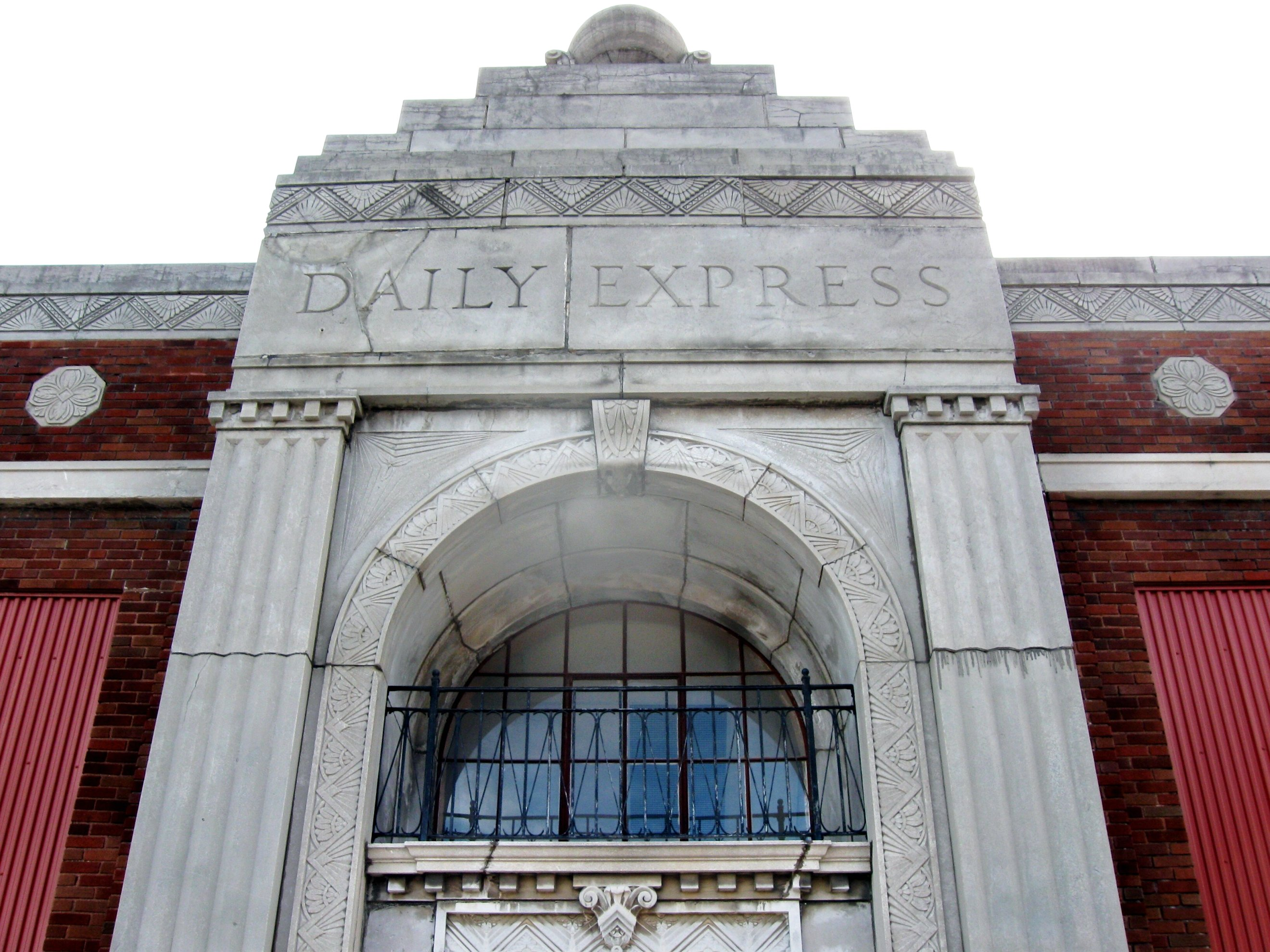
- Entrance to the Daily Express building, constructed in 1930.
- Type: Biweekly newspaper
- Owner: Carpenter Media Group
- Publisher: Jim Hart
- Editor: Marty Bachman
- Founded: 1901
- Headquarters: 705 E. LaHarpe Kirksville, Missouri 63501, United States
- Website: kirksvilledailyexpress.com

The Kirksville Daily Express is a weekly newspaper published on Wednesdays. It serves the Kirksville and Adair County, Missouri, area including the communities of Brashear and Novinger. It is owned by Carpenter Media Group.

== History ==
While newspapers in Adair County date back as early as 1856, the Kirksville Daily Express had its beginnings in 1901 when the Kirksville Evening Express was started by N. A. Matlick and J. Orton Rice. In 1906, under the new ownership of C. C. Howard, the name was changed to the Kirksville Daily Express. In November 1909, Howard sold it to a trio of businessmen led by E. E. Swain. Swain soon bought out his two partners and the newspaper would remain in the Swain family for the next eight decades. Edward Everett Swain, a native of Ewing, Illinois, had considerable newspaper experience before coming to Kirksville. He previously worked for major publications in Rochester, New York, as well as the St. Louis Post-Dispatch, St. Louis Globe-Democrat and the Associated Press.

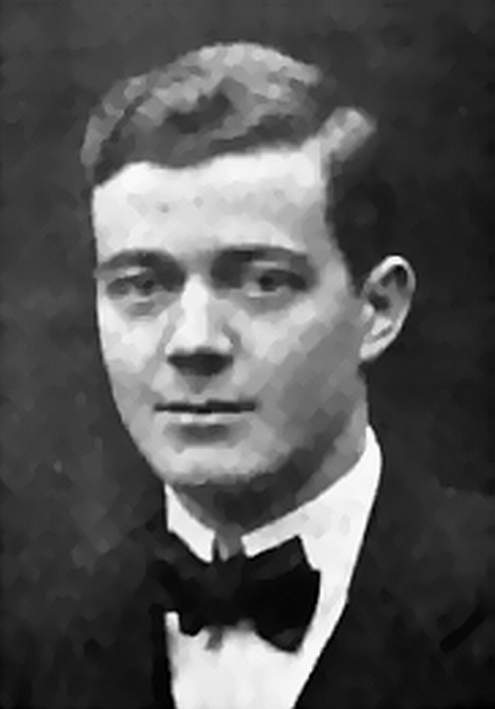
Longtime publisher E.E. Swain

Early notable events in the newspaper's history include joining the United Press Association in 1915 and the coming of news via teletypewriter in 1928. After working out of a number of rented building spaces for the first several years, in 1930 E. E. Swain constructed an art deco style building in downtown Kirksville. It, along with an addition constructed in 1964 to house an offset printing press, continued to serve as the Express offices until 2021. Following Swain's death in 1972 ownership and operation of the newspaper passed to his son, E. E. Swain Jr.

In 1990 the Daily Express was sold to American Publishing Company, although a Swain, E. E.'s grandson Tony, still remained as pressroom supervisor. Gatehouse Media (formerly Liberty Media Group) assumed operation of the newspaper in 1998. Faced with an aging offset press needing upgrade and growing consolidation in the newspaper industry, the decision was made in December 2010 to shift printing of the Kirksville Daily Express to a sister Gatehouse Media operation in Hannibal, Missouri. Other than printing, however, all operations remain in Kirksville.

In August 2021, Gannett (formerly Gatehouse) sold the newspaper to Phillips Media Group. The newspaper was sold again in August 2024 to Carpenter Media Group.
