= The Herald Democrat =

Daily newspaper in Texas, US

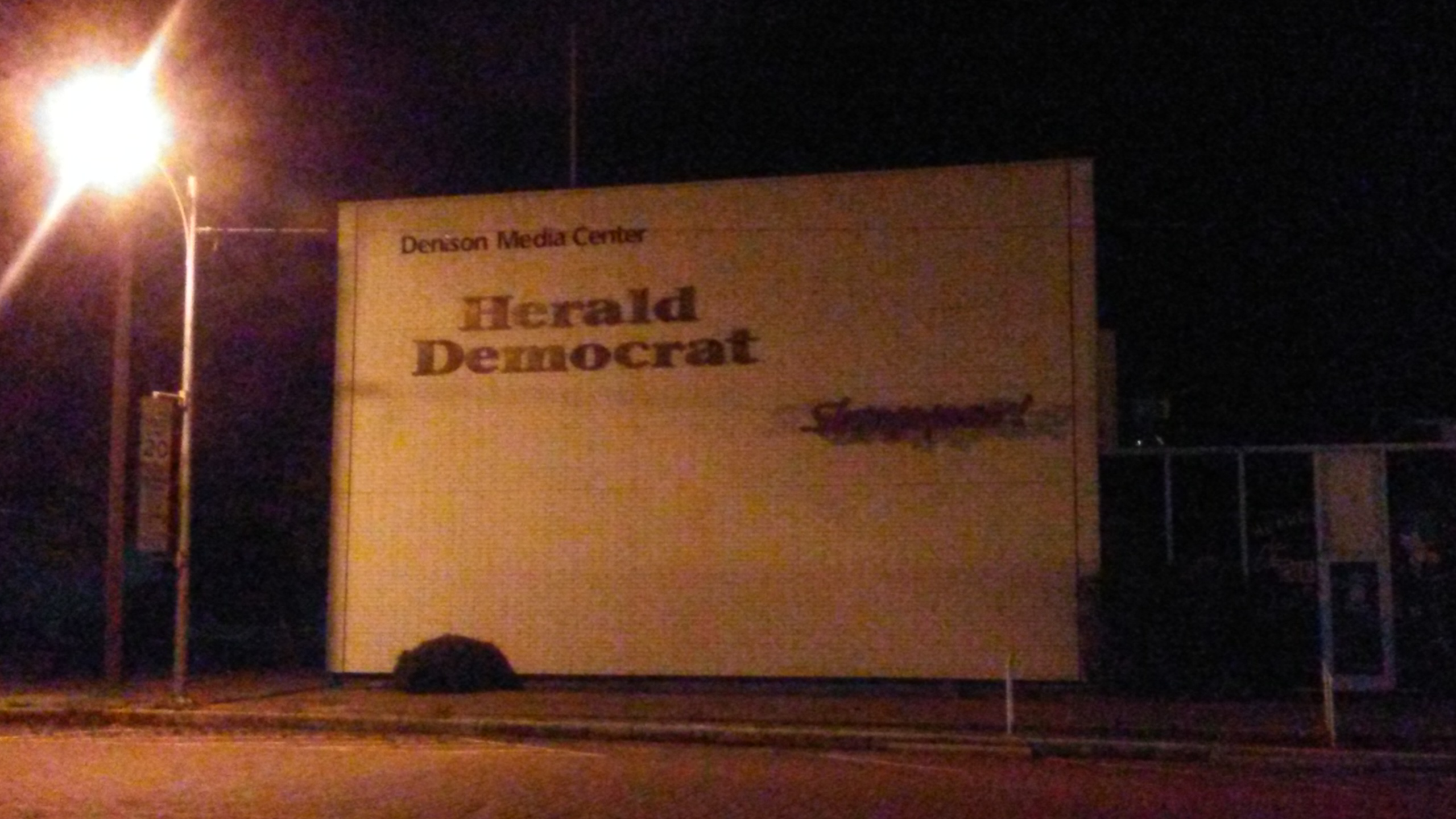
- A Herald Democrat location in downtown Denison
- Type: Weekly newspaper
- Format: Broadsheet
- Owner: CherryRoad Media
- Publisher: Jeremy Gulban
- Editor: Scheane’ Brown
- Founded: 1879 (as Sherman Democrat)
- Headquarters: 603 S. Sam Rayburn Freeway Sherman, TX 750909
- Circulation: 4,518 (as of 2023)
- ISSN: 2834-2224 (print); 2834-2232 (web)
- OCLC number: 35358930
- Website: www.heralddemocrat.com

The Herald Democrat is a daily newspaper located in the twin cities of Sherman and Denison, Texas, in the United States. The Herald Democrat serves all of Grayson and Fannin County, Texas; parts of Collin, Cooke, Denton, Delta, Lamar and Hunt County, Texas; and part of Bryan County, Oklahoma.

== History ==
The Herald Democrat was founded in 1996, when its owner, Stephens Media Group, merged the Denison Herald and the Sherman Democrat. Both papers had been founded in the Texoma area: 1879 in Sherman and 1889 in Denison.

In 2015, the Stephens Media newspapers were sold to New Media Investment Group, which is part of Gatehouse Media. Gatehouse later became Gannett, which sold the paper along with 16 others to CherryRoad Media in February 2022. In September 2023, the Anna-Melissa Tribune and Van Alstyne Leader were merged into the Herald Democrat.
