= Waxahachie Daily Light =

Newspaper serving Ellis County, Texas, U.S.

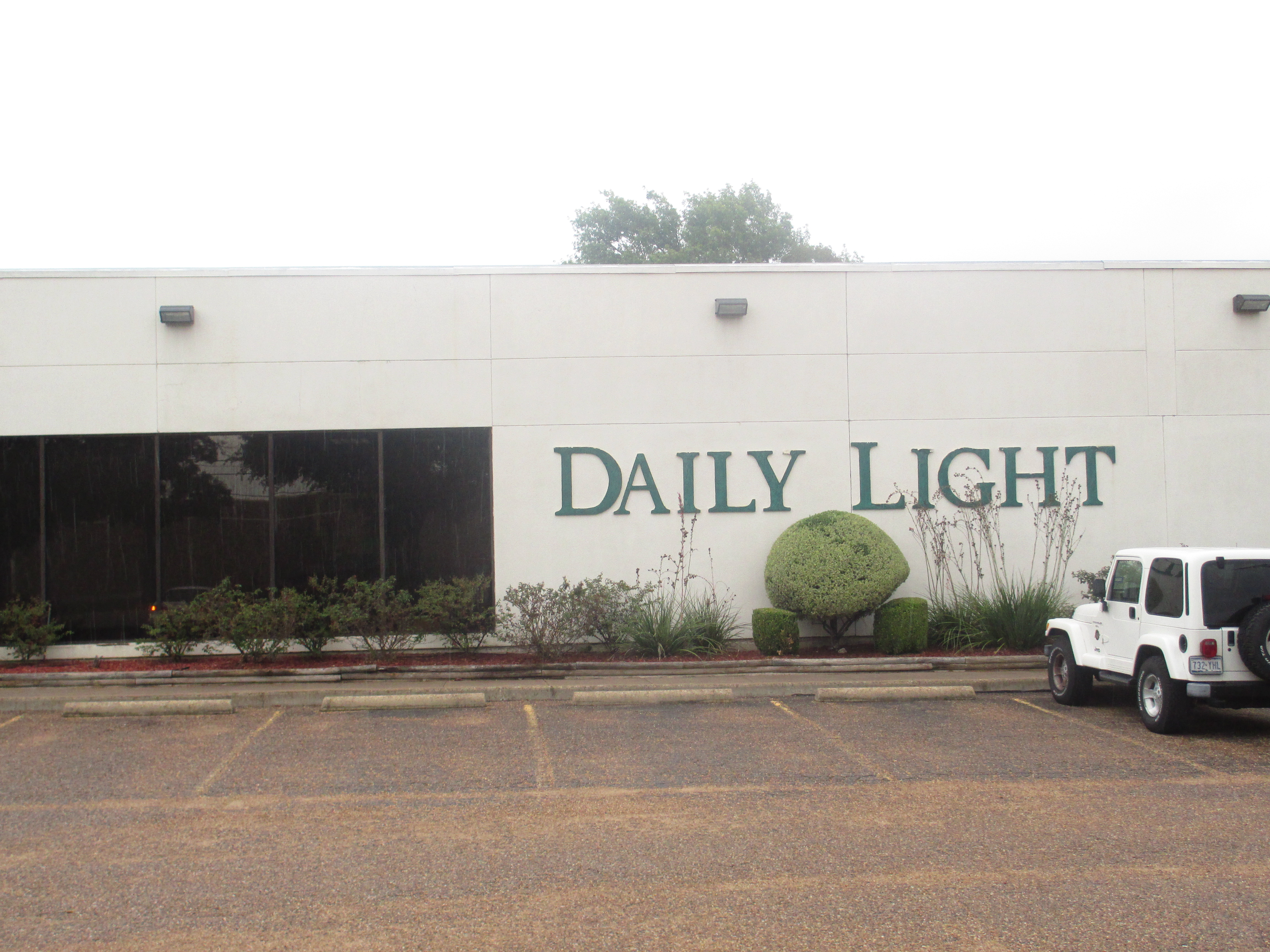
- Type: Weekly newspaper
- Format: Broadsheet
- Owner: CherryRoad Media
- Founded: 1867
- Headquarters: 200 W. Marvin, Waxahachie Texas United States
- Circulation: 1,141 (as of 2023)
- Sister newspapers: Midlothian Mirror
- ISSN: 0896-0291
- OCLC number: 14950021
- Website: waxahachietx.com

The Waxahachie Daily Light is a newspaper serving Ellis County, Texas.

== History ==
The Waxahachie Daily Light started publishing in 1867 and it is the only paper serving Ellis County that started before 1900 and is still operating today. Though papers such as the Waxahachie Argus, the Enterprise, and the Telegraph preceded the Waxahachie Daily Light, by 1917 only the Enterprise and the Daily Light were still in operation.

In 1962, the Waxahachie Daily Light became part of Craco, Inc. and Donald L. Coppedge became co-publisher of the paper with Craig Woodson. In 1969, the paper purchased machinery and equipment for printing papers and began printing in off-set and later in four-colors. They were also printing 13 other papers, and continued to do so until 1970.

Macquarie Media Group of Sydney purchased the paper, along with 40 other titles, from American Consolidated Media, Inc. in 2007. In 2014, New Media Investment Group Inc. acquired the paper as part of the divestiture of American Consolidated Media. The Waxahachie Daily Light was owned by Gatehouse Media, which later became Gannett, who sold the paper to CherryRoad Media in 2022. Around that rime it reduced its print schedule to weekly.

== National attention and controversies ==
After the tragic New London School explosion in 1937, the Waxahachie Daily Light covered stories of survivors and of families whose children were killed. The New York Times reported that the Waxahachie Daily Light called for an Easter Sunday memorial to be held in every Texas community in honor of the hundreds of teachers and children who died.

The Waxahachie Daily Light received national attention for its reporting on the Sherita Dixon Cole controversy. In May 2018, a woman named Sherita Dixon Cole reported that she was kidnapped and raped by a Texas state trooper, who had arrested her for her "attitude" after she was pulled over for suspected intoxicated driving (she passed all DWI/DUI protocols, including a breathalyzer test). The woman's report received national attention when activist Shaun King wrote a post on Facebook about it. The Texas Department of Public Safety issued a response indicating that the dashboard camera footage did not support Cole's report. The Waxahachie Daily Light then published a statement from the Texas Department of Public Safety and published the dashboard camera footage. The article also questioned whether or not Cole's lawyer is authorized to conduct business in Texas. Cole's lawyer later retracted her claims and called for the police officer to be cleared of all claims of wrongdoing.
