= Plaquemine Post South =

US newspaper

The Plaquemine Post South
- Type: Weekly newspaper
- Format: Broadsheet
- Owner: USA Today Co.
- Publisher: Clarice Touhey
- Editor: Greg Fischer
- Founded: 1871
- Headquarters: Plaquemine, Louisiana, United States
- Website: Postsouth.com

The Plaquemine Post South is a weekly newspaper published in Plaquemine, Louisiana, US, owned by the USA Today Co.. It is a member of the Louisiana Press Association. The publication covers news in the City of Plaquemine and the Iberville Parish area.

== History ==
The Plaquemine Post South was established in 1881 by Mary E. Hebert. The newspaper has won several Louisiana Press Association awards.
