= The Tribune-Democrat (La Junta) =

Newspaper in La Junta, Colorado

- Type: Daily newspaper
- Owner(s): CherryRoad Media
- Publisher: Lee Bachlet
- Editor: Christian Burney
- Headquarters: 209 1/2 Colorado Ave, La Junta, Colorado 81050, United States
- Website: lajuntatribunedemocrat.com

The La Junta Tribune-Democrat is a daily newspaper serving La Junta, Colorado, United States, published Mondays through Fridays. It is owned by CherryRoad Media after being purchased from Gannett in 2021.
