= The New Evening Whirl =

Newspaper in Missouri, U.S.

- Type: Weekly newspaper
- Format: Broadsheet
- Owner: Benjamin Thomas
- Publisher: Whirl Pub. Co.
- Editor: Anthony Sanders
- Founded: 1938
- Language: American English
- Headquarters: St. Louis, Missouri
- City: St. Louis, Missouri
- Country: United States
- Circulation: 100,000 (as of 2018)
- OCLC number: 15045378
- Website: thewhirlonline.com

The New Evening Whirl is a newspaper published in St. Louis, Missouri. It was started by Benjamin Thomas in 1938. It is known for its focus on local crime in the St. Louis area and its non-traditional headlines. Anthony Sanders is the editor, and it claims a readership of 100,000.
