= Tri-County Tribune =

- Type: Daily newspaper
- Owner(s): CherryRoad Media
- Publisher: Dena Sattler
- Editor: Jennifer Stultz
- Founded: 1878 (as Pratt County Press)
- Headquarters: 320 South Main Street, Pratt, Kansas 67124, United States
- Circulation: 871
- ISSN: 1048-3675
- Website: tricountytribune.news

Tri-County Tribune is a tri-weekly newspaper published Tuesdays, Thursdays and Saturdays in Pratt, Kansas, United States. It is owned by CherryRoad Media.

== History ==
The newspaper's earliest roots date back to the Pratt County Press, founded in August 1878 in Iuka as the first newspaper established in Pratt County, Kansas. It moved to Pratt when the town was established on April 9, 1884. It later merged with the Saratoga Sun and to became the Pratt Republican.

The Pratt Tribune was established in 1914. It was known as the Pratt Daily Tribune from 1917 to 1964.

In September 2021, Gannett sold Pratt Tribune to CherryRoad Media. In September 2023, Pratt Tribune, Kiowa County Signal in Greensburg and St. John News in St. John were merged to form the Tri-County Tribune.
