= Miami News-Record =

Newspaper in Miami, Oklahoma

- Type: Twice-weekly newspaper
- Format: Broadsheet
- Owner(s): Reid Newspapers
- Founded: 1903
- Headquarters: Miami, Oklahoma United States
- Circulation: 5,300
- Website: miamiok.com

The Miami News-Record is a twice-weekly newspaper that serves Miami, Oklahoma, United States, and the surrounding Ottawa and Delaware counties. Its circulation is 5,300 copies with editions published on Tuesday and Friday. In 2021, it was sold to Reid Newspapers.

== History ==
The first paper in Miami was The Miami Weekly Chief, founded by Charles Dagnet and John Warren, with a circulation of about 100. Founded in 1892, the publication was purchased by L. Dragoo two years later and folded into his newly launched effort, The Weekly Herald. In 1897, The Record was founded by H.C. Brandon; the two Democratic weeklies would be merged with the Herald to form the Miami Record-Herald in 1904. The Record-Herald went to a daily publication schedule in 1917. A subsequent merger with the Republican Miami District Daily News in 1924 produced the earliest News-Record. From 1928 to 1962, it was the Miami Daily News-Record. On September 16, 1962, it began publishing under the banner Miami News-Record.

In 1989, Woodson Newspapers was sold to Boone-Narrangansett Publishing.

In January 2000, American Consolidated Media bought the News-Record from Boone Publishing.

In 2014, the previous owner, American Consolidated Media, sold its Texas and Oklahoma newspapers to New Media Investment Group.

In 2017, the News-Record reduced its publication schedule to two days a week.

In 2021, the News-Record was sold to Reid Newspapers by Gannett, the successor to GateHouse Media.
