= Lake Sun Leader =

Newspaper in Missouri, U.S.

- Type: Semi-weekly newspaper
- Format: Broadsheet
- Owner: Vernon Publishing
- Founder: J. W. Vincent
- Publisher: Trevor Vernon
- Editor: Dan Field
- Founded: 1879 (as the Linn Creek Reveill)
- Headquarters: 4427 Osage Beach Parkway, Osage Beach, Missouri 65065, United States
- Website: lakenewsonline.com

The Lake Sun Leader is a semi-weekly newspaper, with Wednesday and Friday editions, published in Osage Beach, Missouri, United States, covering the Lake of the Ozarks region. It is owned by Vernon Publishing.

In addition to Osage Beach, the newspaper also covers Camden, Miller, and Morgan Counties as well as the cities of Camdenton, Climax Springs, Eldon, Lake Ozark, Laurie, Linn Creek, Macks Creek, Sunrise Beach, Versailles, and Village of Four Seasons.

== History ==
The Linn Creek Reveille was founded in 1879 by J. W. Vincent. After his death in 1933, the paper was sold to Clint Webb in 1933 and then G. T. Richards in 1937. The paper became the Lake Sun Leader sometime in the early 1990’s.

In August 2021, Gannett sold the newspaper to Vernon Publishing, Inc.
