= The Shawnee News-Star =

Newspaper in Shawnee, Oklahoma, US

Shawnee News-Star
- Type: Daily newspaper
- Format: Broadsheet
- Owner: CherryRoad Media
- Publisher: Jeremy Gulban
- Editor: Kim Morava
- Founded: c. 1894, as The Weekly News
- Headquarters: 1725 North Kickapoo Avenue, Suite 101, Shawnee, Oklahoma 74804, United States
- Circulation: 6,000
- OCLC number: 12110604
- Website: news-star.com

The Shawnee News-Star is an American daily newspaper published in Shawnee, Oklahoma. It is the newspaper of record for Pottawatomie, Lincoln and Seminole counties, in the Oklahoma City metropolitan area.

== History ==
The newspaper took its current name in 1943 after the merger of the Shawnee Evening Star and Shawnee Morning News. The paper was formerly owned by Stauffer Communications, which was acquired by Morris Communications in 1994. Morris sold the paper, along with thirteen others, to GateHouse Media in 2007. Gannett sold the paper, along with 16 others to CherryRoad Media in February 2022.
