= The Ardmoreite =

American newspaper in Ardmore, Oklahoma

- Type: Daily newspaper
- Format: Broadsheet
- Owner: CherryRoad Media
- Editor: Interim
- Founded: October 28, 1893
- Headquarters: 117 West Broadway, Ardmore, Oklahoma 73402, United States
- Circulation: 6,000 Daily (as of 2010)
- Website: ardmoreite.com

The Ardmoreite is an American daily newspaper published Tuesday through Friday and Sunday mornings in Ardmore, Oklahoma.

== History ==
The paper was owned by Stauffer Communications, which was acquired by Morris Communications in 1994. Morris sold the paper, along with thirteen others, to GateHouse Media in 2007. Gannett sold the paper, along with 16 others to CherryRoad Media in February 2022.
