= Boonville Daily News =

American daily newspaper

- Type: Daily newspaper
- Format: Broadsheet
- Owner: CherryRoad Media
- Publisher: Mike Murphy
- Editor: Angela Hutschreider, Chris Bowie
- Founded: 1919, as Boonville Daily Republican
- Headquarters: 301 Main Street, Boonville, Missouri 65233, United States
- Circulation: 1,000
- OCLC number: 19483338
- Website: boonvilledailynews.com

The Boonville Daily News is an American daily newspaper published in Boonville, Missouri, United States. The Daily News covers Cooper and Howard counties in central Missouri.

== History ==
The newspaper was founded in 1919. Gannett sold the paper in 2021 to CherryRoad Media.
