= Chillicothe Constitution-Tribune =

Newspaper in Missouri, U.S.

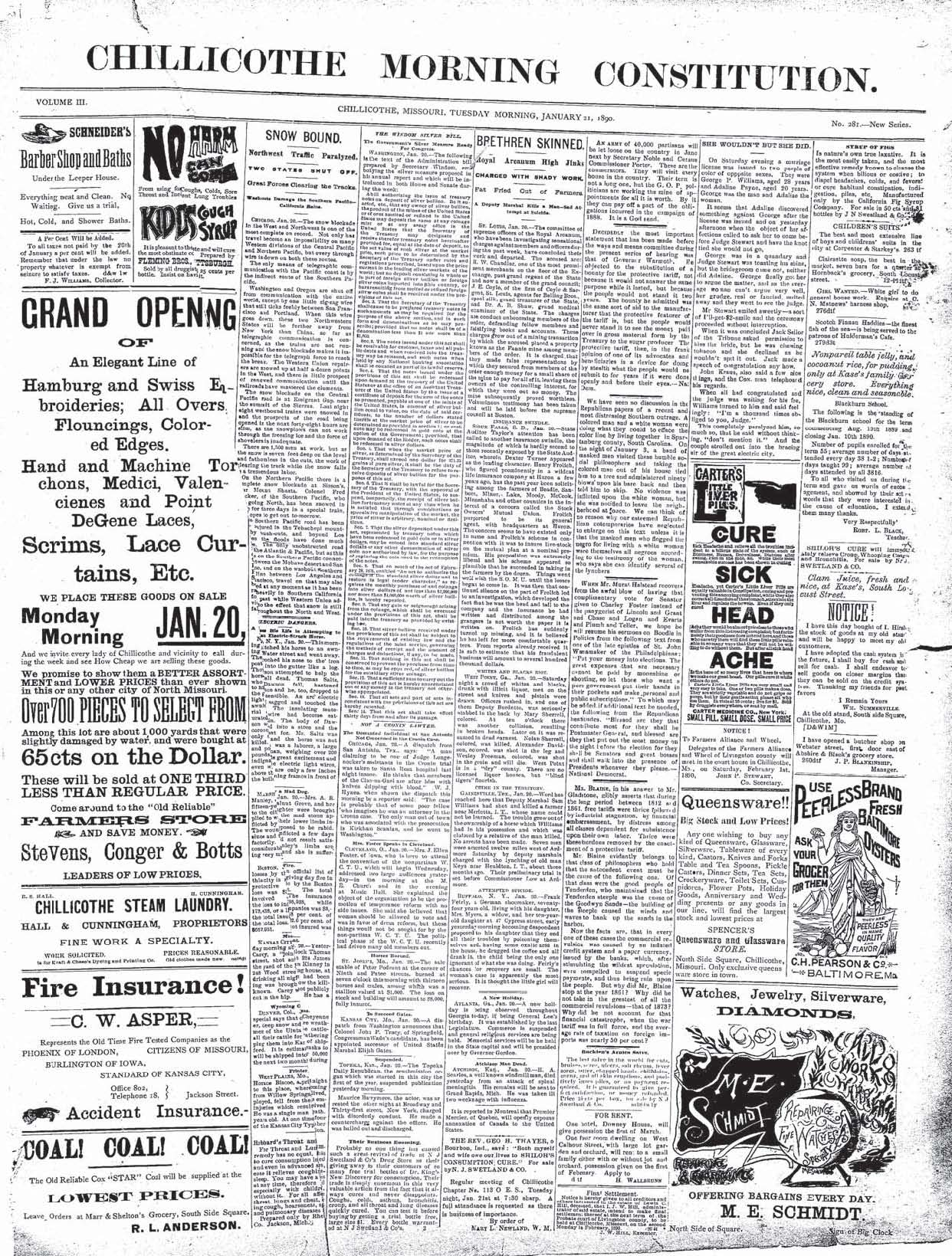
- January 21, 1890, front page of Chillicothe Morning Constitution
- Type: Weekly newspaper
- Format: Broadsheet
- Owner: CherryRoad Media
- Publisher: Jeremy Gulban
- Editor: Angie Hutschreider
- Founded: 1860, as Chillicothe Constitution
- Headquarters: 516 Washington Street, Chillicothe, Missouri 64601, United States
- Website: chillicothenews.com

The Chillicothe Constitution-Tribune is a weekly newspaper published on Wednesdays in Chillicothe, Missouri, United States. It is owned by CherryRoad Media. Founded in 1860 as the weekly Chillicothe Constitution, the paper has been published daily since 1889 (initially as the Chillicothe Morning Constitution), and under its current name since 1930.

== History ==
The weekly Chillicothe Constitution was founded in 1860 as a Democratic-leaning newspaper. The Tribune, a Republican-leaning newspaper, was founded in 1868. In the 1880s the Watkins family became publishers of the Constitution. The two newspapers consolidated March 1, 1928. The Watkins family solid it in April 1972 to Inland Industries, Inc., of Lenexa, Kansas, and Smith-Walls Newspapers, Inc., of Fort Payne, Alabama. Clarence Edwin Watkins served as the publisher until his death in 1944.

Jerry Litton visited the newspaper offices about 8:30 p.m. on August 3, 1976, to check results of the election in which he had won the Democratic primary for U.S. Senate, en route to a victory party in Kansas City. He was killed about a half-hour later during an airplane takeoff at the Chillicothe airport.

In 2021, Gannett sold the newspaper to CherryRoad Media.

== Fire ==
December 26, 1930 edition, the day after the fire.

On Christmas Day in 1930, a fire broke out in the office of Dr. Oma Dye, located above the newspaper offices. According to the December 26, 1930, edition of the paper, two patrons were leaving a nearby theater when they saw smoke coming from the building. As the fire department was arriving on the scene Chillicothe Mayor Harry Pardonner, who was also a fireman, was thrown from the truck as the ladder broke free and swung. According to the paper the mayor was "badly bruised" and would be confined to bed for several days. The doctor's office was a total loss while the newspaper offices were damaged by water "putting practically all of the machinery in the shop out of commission and spoiling the supply of print paper on hand." The newspaper's publishers assured their readers that every effort had been made to get that day's edition out via the old method of "setting the type by hand."

== Publishers ==
- Jeremy Gulban, current
- R. Douglas Pearson Jr., 1972 - 1980
- Clarence Edwin Watkins, ? through 1944
