= Phelps County Focus =

Newspaper in Rolla, Missouri

- “It’s All About You!”
- Type: Weekly newspaper
- Owner: Carpenter Media Group
- Publisher: Donald Dodd
- Language: English
- Headquarters: 101 West 7th Street, Rolla, Missouri 65401, United States
- Website: phelpscountyfocus.com

The Phelps County Focus is a weekly newspaper published in Rolla, Missouri, United States. The paper covers Rolla and Phelps County, Missouri, including the city of Newburg.

== History ==
The Phelps County Focus traces its history back to several Rolla newspapers that date back to the 1870s. Edward W. Sowers and two others bought the weekly Rolla New Era in 1942. Sowers later acquired full ownership and changed the paper's name to the Rolla Daily News. He worked as publisher until his death in 1982.

The Rolla Daily News was noted for its coverage of the development of Rolla as a town, with a dedicated "Progress Edition" having been published annually during the town's growth in the 1940s and 1950s. Madeleine Albright worked as a reporter at the newspaper in the 1950s. The paper the site of legal notices regarding the environmental impact of the Route 63 Corridor Project.

The Sower family eventually sold the Rolla Daily News to American Publishing Company, and then the paper later became owned by GateHouse Media. Gatehouse closed the St. James Leader-Journal in St. James in 2016 and the Waynesvile Daily Guide in Waynesville in 2018. Both were absorbed into the Rolla Daily News. In 2019, Gatehouse acquired Gannett and then took on the name.

In August 2021, Gannett sold the newspaper to Phillips Media Group. The paper was sold again a month later to Salem Publishing Company. It was then merged into the Phelps County Focus, which was launched in August 2017 as a competitor. In January 2025, Salem Publishing Company sold the Phelps County Focus, The Salem News and Pulaski County Weekly to Carpenter Media Group.
