= The Newton Kansan =

Newspaper in Newton, Kansas

- Type: Tri-weekly newspaper
- Format: Broadsheet
- Owner(s): CherryRoad Media
- Publisher: Randy Mitchell
- Editor: Chad Frey
- Founded: 1872
- Headquarters: 121 West Sixth Street, Newton, Kansas 67114, United States
- Circulation: 2,062
- OCLC number: 11586510
- Website: thekansan.com

The Newton Kansan is an American newspaper published three days per week (excluding major holidays) in Newton, Kansas. It is owned by CherryRoad Media. The paper covers Harvey County, including the cities of Newton, Burrton, Halstead, Hesston, North Newton and Sedgwick.

== History ==
The paper was founded as a weekly in 1872 and converted to a daily circulation in 1886. In 1952, it changed its name from The Evening Kansan-Republican to The Newton Kansan. The newspaper's electronic version began in 1996.

Stauffer Communications bought the newspaper in 1953. Morris Communications bought Stauffer in 1994, and sold the Kansan to GateHouse Media in October 2007. In 2021, the Kansan was purchased by New Jersey–based CherryRoad Media along with several other Kansas newspapers.

== See also ==
- List of newspapers in Kansas
