= The Mexico Ledger =

Local newspaper in Mexico, Missouri, United States

- Type: Daily newspaper
- Format: Broadsheet
- Owner: Westplex Media Group
- Publisher: Tim Schmidt
- Editor: Dave Faries
- Founded: 1856
- Headquarters: 113 East Monroe Street; Mexico, Missouri 65265; United States
- Circulation: 2,720 Weekday
- Website: mexicoledger.com

The Mexico Ledger is the only daily newspaper published in Mexico, Missouri, United States and the surrounding rural area. The current owner is the Westplex Media Group, who purchased the paper from Gannett in 2020.

Although it primarily serves the city of Mexico, the Ledger also covers news and local events in Audrain, Monroe, Montgomery, and Callaway Counties.

== See also ==
- Pendleton Dudley - former reporter
