= Moberly Monitor-Index =

Newspaper in Missouri, USA

- Type: Weekly newspaper
- Format: Broadsheet
- Owner: CherryRoad Media
- Founder: Lafayette R. Brown
- Publisher: Mike Murphy
- Editor: Jimmy DeRogatis
- Founded: 1869
- Headquarters: 218 North Williams Street, Moberly, Missouri 65270, United States
- Circulation: 1,200
- Website: moberlymonitor.com

The Moberly Monitor-Index is a weekly newspaper published Fridays in Moberly, Missouri, United States.

== History ==
The Moberly Monitor-Index newspaper was started on June 23, 1869 by Lafayette R. Brown under the name of The Monitor. In 2021, Gannett sold the paper to Westplex Media Group, owner of the Warren County Record. Two years later the paper was sold to CherryRoad Media in October 2023.
