= The Carthage Press =

Newspaper in Missouri, U.S.

- Type: Daily newspaper
- Format: Broadsheet
- Founded: April 1872, as The People's Press
- Headquarters: Carthage, MissouriUnited States
- OCLC number: 28446911

The Carthage Press was an American daily newspaper publisheded in Carthage, Missouri. It was owned by GateHouse Media until August 28, 2018. In September 2018, RH Media Group, a locally owned media company, announced they would be taking over publication of The Carthage Press with the first print issue in October. Publication of the print edition was abruptly shut down in January 2019. No announcements have been made about the paper's future.

The paper once billed itself as "Southwest Missouri's Oldest Daily Newspaper"; its daily predecessor The Evening Press began in 1885. Its roots as a weekly newspaper date to The People's Press, published in Carthage in 1872. Gatehouse Media announced on August 28, 2018, that the following day's issue would be its last. RH Media Group announced that it would be carrying on the 146-year-old newspaper tradition.
