= Hannibal Courier-Post =

Daily newspaper in Hannibal, Missouri

- Type: Daily newspaper
- Format: Broadsheet
- Owner: Carpenter Media Group
- Publisher: Jim Hart
- Founded: 1832, as Missouri Courier
- Headquarters: 200 North Third Street, Hannibal, Missouri 63401, United States
- Circulation: 5,383
- Website: hannibal.net

The Hannibal Courier-Post is a daily newspaper published in Hannibal, Missouri, United States. It is owned by Carpenter Media Group.

In addition to Hannibal, the Courier-Post covers several other communities in Marion, Pike, and Ralls Counties, including the cities of Bowling Green, Center, Louisiana, Monroe City, New London, Palmyra, Perry, Saverton, and Vandalia.

== History ==
The newspaper claims to be the oldest daily newspaper in Missouri, having printed daily since 1853 and tracing its lineage back to several weekly newspapers in and around Hannibal: the Commercial Advertiser (1837), later called the Pacific Monitor (1840), Hannibal Journal (1841) and Hannibal Journal and Western Union (1850); the Hannibal Gazette (1846); the Hannibal Messenger (1851); and a Palmyra weekly, the Missouri Courier, founded in 1832 and consolidated with the Gazette in 1848.

The Journal converted to a daily March 16, 1853, the Messenger in 1858. The Messenger combined with the Courier in 1863, adopting the name North Missouri Courier. The daily Courier in 1891 merged with the Daily Post, marking the debut of the name Hannibal Courier-Post. The Morning Journal was acquired in 1918.

Individual owners had published the Courier-Post and its predecessors since the 1850s, including Thomas B. Morse, who had founded the Daily Post in 1886 and remained publisher of the merged newspaper until 1907. Morse sold the paper that year to Lee Enterprises, which invested heavily in its new acquisition, with a new printing press, Associated Press wire, and a new building.

Lee sold the paper to Stauffer Communications in 1969. Morris Communications acquired Stauffer in 1995. GateHouse Media, purchased the Courier-Post in 2007. Quincy Media, owners of the Quincy Herald-Whig, purchased the Courier-Post in 2019. The newspaper was sold in 2021 to Phillips Media Group, and again in 2024 to Carpenter Media Group.

=== Mark Twain ===
As the hometown daily newspapers of Mark Twain (Samuel Clemens), the predecessors of the Hannibal Courier-Post were an important part of the future literary star's youth.

It was an advertisement in the Commercial Advertiser weekly, from February 27, 1839, that lured Twain's father John Marshall Clemens to Hannibal.

Twain himself worked on the Missouri Courier, as a "printer's devil" in 1849, as he recalled in a 1908 letter to the Courier's editors:

Surreptitiously and uninvited I helped to edit the paper when no one was watching; therefore I was a journalist. I have never been wholly disconnected from Journalism since; therefore, by my guess, I am dean of the trade in America. I hope the Courier will long survive me and remain always prosperous. Mark Twain.

Twain's older brother, Orion Clemens, briefly owned the Hannibal Journal and Western Union, 1850-1853, employing Twain as a typesetter and contributor of articles and humorous sketches.

In the Autobiography of Mark Twain, Volume 1, entry 29 March 1906, Twain described his life as a printer's apprentice at the office of the "Hannibal Courier" (sic) and how a fellow apprentice was rebuked for abbreviating "Jesus Christ" to "J.C." when typesetting a sermon by Reverend Alexander Campbell. "He (Rev. Campbell) said, 'So long as you live, don’t you ever diminish the Savior’s name again. Put it all in.' He repeated this admonition a couple of times to emphasize it, then he went away." As Twain described it:

In that day the common swearers of the region had a way of their own of emphasizing the Savior’s name when they were using it profanely, and this fact intruded itself into Wales’s incorrigible mind. It offered him an opportunity for a momentary entertainment which seemed to him to be more precious and more valuable than even fishing and swimming could afford. So he imposed upon himself the long and weary and dreary task of overrunning all those three pages in order to improve upon his former work and incidentally and thoughtfully improve upon the great preacher’s admonition. He enlarged the offending J.C. into Jesus H. Christ. Wales knew that that would make prodigious trouble, and it did. But it was not in him to resist it. He had to succumb to the law of his make. I don’t remember what his punishment was, but he was not the person to care for that. He had already collected his dividend.
