= Pennysaver =

Free community newspaper in North America

A pennysaver (or free ads paper, Friday ad or shopper) is a free community periodical available in North America (typically weekly or monthly publications) that advertises items for sale. Frequently pennysavers are actually called The Pennysaver (variants include Penny Saver, Penny-saver, PennySaver). It usually contains classified ads grouped into categories. Many pennysavers also offer local news and entertainment, as well as generic advice information, various syndicated or locally written columns on various topics of interest, limited comics and primetime TV listings.

The term is widely used in eastern North America from Ontario through New York, Pennsylvania, and Maryland, though there are pennysavers elsewhere. Pennysavers are sometimes published by a locally dominant daily newspaper as a brand extension of their publication and featuring advertisements published in the same style as the parent newspaper.

The PennySaver was a publication distributed in California. Formerly owned by Harte-Hanks, it and its website were sold to OpenGate Capital in 2013. The publication went out of business in May 2015. OpenGate was subsequently sued for not providing proper notice before firing hundreds of employees.

In May 2016, a group of former PennySaver employees resurrected the publication in southern California's Inland Empire and northern Orange County.

== Other countries ==
United Kingdom - In November 2025 Pennysaver.org.uk was registered and the site seems to have been operating since 1 June 2026. It has a mix of coupons, advertisements and general items about savings from the news.

== In popular culture ==
In Donna Tartt's 1992 novel The Secret History, the Pennysaver is mentioned in Chapter 7.

The Pennysaver plays a significant role in the 2007 film Juno, in which the main character, Juno, searches for adoptive parents for her unborn child in the publication.

In The Golden Girls episode "Older and Wiser," Rose and Blanche are hired to model for a local pennysaver. The two begin to bicker over who has the prettier face and hands, but the joke is on them: When the pennysaver is delivered, they find out that they appear in an ad for beauty cream—as "before" models.

In the Two and a Half Men episode "Something Salty and Twisted", Alan Harper (Jon Cryer) has a feature article written of him titled "ALAN HARPER: Good Doctor, Good Neighbor, Good Guy." in the Tarzana PennySaver. It is revealed that to be featured in the article he had to buy advertisements in the paper.

In the Save Me episode "Heavenly Hostess", Beth Harper (Anne Heche) is told by God that she needs to have a garage sale. After multiple people start showing up to her address for a yard sale that was advertised in the PennySaver, Beth realizes that God placed the ad in the PennySaver to make sure that she has her garage sale on that specific day.

In the Parks and Recreation episode "The Pawnee-Eagleton Tip Off Classic", Ron Swanson (Nick Offerman) receives the Pawnee PennySaver in the mail at his girlfriend's residence, which sends him on an overzealous quest to get off the grid. When Ron asks, "Who or what is PennySaver?", Tom Haverford (Aziz Ansari) responds, "It's a free circular with a bunch of coupons in it".

In the NCIS: Los Angeles episode "Allegiance", when Special Agent G. Callen and Special Agent Sam Hanna (Chris O'Donnell and LL Cool J) interview a suspect, they are surprised to find that he is not a threat, but instead an ambitious entrepreneur wanting to get his brand out there with his chosen method, the PennySaver.

In the Young Sheldon episode "A Therapist, a Comic Book, and a Breakfast Sausage", Sheldon is taken to a psychiatrist to overcome his fear of eating solid foods. Sheldon's father asks him if he has a coupon from the pennysaver, to save some money.

In the 2011 non-fiction book It Chooses You, author Miranda July interviewed thirteen PennySaver sellers in Los Angeles.
