= Brownwood Bulletin =

Daily newspaper based in Brownwood, Texas

- Type: Daily newspaper
- Format: Broadsheet
- Owner: CherryRoad Media
- Editor: Derrick Stuckly (interim)
- Founded: 1880–1900
- Headquarters: 700 Carnegie St; Brownwood, TX 76801; United States
- Circulation: 4,275 (as of 2023)
- Website: brownwoodtx.com

The Brownwood Bulletin is a daily newspaper based in Brownwood, Texas, United States.

== History ==
Brownwood attorney William Harding Mayes purchased the weeklies Brownwood Bulletin in the 1886 and Brownwood Banner in the 1887, consolidating them into the Brownwood Banner-Bulletin. His brother H.F. Mayes and he started the daily Brownwood Daily Bulletin on October 15, 1900. He published the newspaper until 1914.

H.F. Mayes and J.C. White bought the newspaper operation in 1919 and operated it until 1940, when C.C. Woodson bought the daily Bulletin. In 1933, The weekly Banner-Bulletin and its commercial printing division were sold to Mayes' son, Wendell W. Mayes, and partner John W. Blake, who renamed it the Brownwood Banner; the company was later sold to Clark Coursey. The papers merged in the 1950s. In 1959, Woodson's son, Craig, bought the newspaper and began building a small chain of area newspapers.

In 1971, the newspaper moved to its current location and began using an offset press. In 1989, the Woodson Newspapers Inc. chain was sold to Boone Publishing of Tuscaloosa, Alabama. American Consolidated Media acquired the Bulletin in 1999.

The Macquarie Group bought Bulletin parent company American Consolidated Media in 2007. ACM violated a $133.7 million loan agreement in 2009, and a group of lenders took over the company from Macquarie subsidiary Southern Cross Media Group in 2010.

First published as a daily Monday through Saturday, a Sunday edition was added in 1940. The Saturday edition was dropped in 1953, but reinstated in 2004. The Bulletin went back to six-day publication when it dropped the Monday edition in 2009.

In 2005, the paper changed to morning delivery. Its publication cycle had previously been afternoon delivery.

The Bulletin began its website, brownwoodbulletin.com, in 1999. It moved to brownwoodtx.com in 2011.

In 2014, ACM sold its Texas and Oklahoma newspapers to New Media Investment Group.

Gannett sold the paper, along with 16 others to CherryRoad Media in February 2022.

== Key dates in Brownwood Bulletin history ==
- Oct. 15, 1900: Newspaper began daily publication
- 1905: New building constructed in downtown Brownwood
- 1971: Moved to current Carnegie Street location and began using offset printing press
- December 1999: Launch of the Bulletin's Web site www.brownwoodbulletin.com
- September 2004: Reintroduction of the Saturday Bulletin
- December 2005: Changed to seven-day-a-week morning delivery schedule
- October 2009: Changed to six-day-a-week morning delivery schedule (no Monday paper)
- July 2011: The Bulletin changed its website over to a community-based model and moved to brownwoodtx.com

The Bulletin, as of 2023, is owned by CherryRoad Media.
