= Deaths in November 2000 =

The following is a list of notable deaths in November 2000.

Entries for each day are listed alphabetically by surname. A typical entry lists information in the following sequence:

- Name, age, country of citizenship at birth, subsequent country of citizenship (if applicable), reason for notability, cause of death (if known), and reference.

== November 2000 ==
=== 1 ===
- Howard P. Anderson, 85, American politician.
- George Armstrong, 56, English football player and coach, brain haemorrhage.
- Sally Elizabeth Carlson, 104, American mathematician.
- David Crook, 90, British-Chinese communist activist and spy.
- Bernard Erhard, 66, American actor.
- Steve Evans, 58, American motorsports broadcaster, heart attack.
- Kjell Holler, 75, Norwegian economist and politician.
- Oleksandr Mantsevych, 40, Soviet Ukrainian Olympic rower (1980).
- Sir Steven Runciman, 97, English historian.
- Richard K. Webel, 100, American landscape architect.

=== 2 ===
- Teofils Biķis, 48, Latvian pianist.
- Eddie Collins, Jr., 83, American baseball player (Philadelphia Athletics).
- Robert Cormier, 75, American author and journalist, complications from a blood clot.
- Anders Gernandt, 80, Swedish army officer and Olympic equestrian (1956, 1960).
- Michael Herman, 57, French American mathematician.
- Eva Morris, 114, second oldest living person (1999 - 2000).
- Sue Ryder, 76, British baroness and charity founder.
- Simeon Simeonov, 54, Bulgarian football goalkeeper.
- Avatus Stone, 69, American gridiron football player (Baltimore Colts), cancer.

=== 3 ===
- Aga Syed Mehdi, 41, Indian cleric and politician, IED explosion.
- Leonardo Benvenuti, 77, Italian screenwriter.
- Doris L. Berryman, 74, American college professor, pancreatic cancer.
- Vincent Birchler, 88, American educator and politician.
- Bengt Brunskog, 80, Swedish stage, film and television actor.
- Bob Bryant, 82, American gridiron football player (San Francisco 49ers).
- Eugene A. Burdick, 88, American judge.
- Michael Stapleton-Cotton, 5th Viscount Combermere, 71, British academic.
- Frank Frazier, 40, American football player (Washington Redskins).
- Jerry Hennessy, 74, American football player (Chicago Cardinals, Washington Redskins).
- Charles F. Hockett, 84, American linguist.
- Robert Sherlaw Johnson, 68, British composer and musicologist.
- Betty Slade, 79, British diver and Olympian (1936).
- George Vandeman, 84, American evangelist and broadcaster, heart failure.
- Allen Whitehill Clowes, 83, American philanthropist.

=== 4 ===
- Carl Biddiscombe, 76, Canadian-American set decorator.
- Vernel Fournier, 72, American jazz drummer, cerebral hemorrhage.
- Stephanie Lawrence, 50, British singer and actress, liver disease.
- Amalia Hernández, 83, Mexican ballet choreographer.
- John Reynolds, 77, American physicist, pneumonia.
- Ian Sneddon, 80, Scottish mathematician.

=== 5 ===
- Etienne Aigner, 95, Austrian-American fashion designer.
- Dionisio Arce, 73, Paraguayan football player.
- Kevin Borland, 74, Australian architect.
- David Brower, 88, American environmentalist.
- Jim Brutz, 81, American football player (Chicago Rockets).
- Jimmie Davis, 101, American singer, songwriter and politician (Governor of Louisiana), stroke.
- Petar Dertliev, 84, Bulgarian politician, cancer.
- Victor Grinich, 75, American pioneer in the semiconductor industry, prostate cancer.
- Henrik Lange, 92, Swedish Coastal Artillery officer.
- Frances Lee, 94, American film actress.
- Willard Marshall, 79, American baseball player.
- Bibi Titi Mohamed, 74, Tanzanian politician and activist.
- Maria Oberbreyer, 78, Austrian Olympic sprinter (1948).
- Jack O'Brian, 86, American entertainment journalist.
- Roger Peyrefitte, 93, French writer and diplomat, Parkinson's disease.
- Frances C. Roberts, 83, American historian.
- Gleb Savinov, 85, Soviet and Russian painter and art teacher.
- Hu Sheng, 82, Chinese marxist theorist and historian.
- Dave Sheppard, 68, American Olympic weightlifter (1956).
- Mary Sinclair, 77, American actress.
- Harry Taylor, 81, American baseball player (Brooklyn Dodgers, Boston Red Sox).
- Per-Owe Trollsås, 67, Swedish sprinter and Olympian (1960).

=== 6 ===
- Torgny Anderberg, 81, Swedish actor and film director.
- Joseph Marie Armer, 93, American Roman Catholic sister.
- John Birch, 78, English luthier.
- Emmet Birk, 86, American basketball player.
- Eddy Bruma, 75, Surinamese politician, lawyer and writer, injuries sustained during robbery.
- Herbert Brün, 82, German composer and pioneer of electronic and computer music.
- Bob Burns, 79, American football player and coach.
- L. Sprague de Camp, 92, American writer.
- Enrico Castiglioni, 86, Italian writer, engineer, and architect.
- K. D. K. Dharmawardena, 56, Sri Lankan lyricist.
- John McPhail, 76, Scottish football player.
- Ioannis Nembidis, 72, Greek footballer.
- Stefaniya Stanyuta, 95, Soviet and Belarus theater and movie actress.
- Vasiliy Yershov, 51, Ukrainian javelin thrower and Olympian (1976).

=== 7 ===
- Edulji Aibara, 86, Indian cricketer.
- Tara Cherian, 87, Indian social activist and politician.
- Derman Christopherson, 85, British engineering science academic.
- Hal Fowler, 73, American poker player, diabetes.
- Julius Hatry, 93, German aircraft designer and builder, heart failure.
- Jim Hutchinson, 103, English cricketer and centenarian.
- Nimalan Soundaranayagam, 50, Sri Lankan Tamil teacher and politician, shot.
- Chidambaram Subramaniam, 90, Indian politician and independence activist.
- Ingrid of Sweden, 90, Queen consort of Frederik IX of Denmark.
- Kōzaburō Yoshimura, 89, Japanese film director, heart failure.
- Boris Zakhoder, 82, Russian poet and children's writer.

=== 8 ===
- Maria Bentel, 72, American architect, bone marrow cancer.
- Einar Örn Birgisson, 27, Icelandic footballer and businessman, homicide.
- Brian Boydell, 83, Irish composer.
- Bill Burton, 78, New Zealand cricketer.
- Angeline Caruso, 78, American educator and administrator, complications from heart disease.
- Elio Crovetto, 73, Italian actor and comedian.
- Herberts Dāboliņš, 92, Latvian Olympic cross-country skier (1936).
- Dupa, 55, Belgian comics artist, cerebral hemorrhage.
- John Levitow, 55, US Air Force loadmaster and recipient of the Medal of Honor, cancer.
- Dick Morrissey, 60, British jazz musician and composer, cancer.
- Faris Odeh, 14, Palestinian boy demonstrator, shot by the Israel Defense Forces.
- Józef Pińkowski, 71, Prime Minister of Poland.
- Svetlana Kana Radević, 62, Montenegrin architect.
- Andrzej Salamon, 64, Polish Olympic swimmer (1960).
- Jan van der Vaart, 69, Dutch ceramist.

=== 9 ===
- Hussein Abayat, Palestinian military commander, missile strike.
- Chiyonosuke Azuma, 74, Japanese actor and dancer, heart failure.
- Henri Baillot, 75, French football player.
- Mario Cantu, 63, American Maoist.
- Ernest J. Cole, 83-84, Canadian engineer and politician.
- Michel Demaret, 60, Belgian politician.
- Vasantrao S. Dempo, 84, Indian industrialist and philanthropist.
- Avedis Donabedian, 81, Lebanese-American physician.
- Sherwood Johnston, 73, American racing driver.
- Kurt Koch, 81, German football manager.
- Ferenc Mayer, 92, Hungarian football player.
- Eddie Miller, 84, American gridiron football player (New York Giants).
- Eric Morley, 82, British TV host.
- Hugh Paddick, 85, English actor (BBC radio show Round the Horne).

=== 10 ===
- Adamantios Androutsopoulos, 81, Greek lawyer and politician, Prime Minister (1973-1974).
- Jacques Chaban-Delmas, 85, French Gaullist politician and Prime Minister of France, heart attack.
- Joseph Comiti, 80, French physician, surgeon and politician.
- Alfred H. Corbett, 85, American attorney.
- Jorge Fernández-Maldonado, 78, Peruvian politician, Prime Minister (1976).
- Art Jackes, 76, Canadian high jumper and Olympian (1948).
- Bob Matthewson, 70, English footballer and referee.
- Walter P. McConaughy, 92, American diplomat and ambassador.
- Big Moose Meyer, 90, American basketball player.
- Alan Tyson, 74, British musicologist.
- Dawn-Marie Wesley, 14, Canadian bullying victim, suicide by hanging.

=== 11 ===
- Rayford Barnes, 80, American actor.
- Harivallabh Bhayani, 83, Gujarati-language Indian writer.
- James Morris Blaut, 73, American anthropologist and geographer, heart failure.
- Alun Talfan Davies, 87, Welsh judge, publisher and politician.
- Hugo Pos, 86, Surinamese judge, writer, and poet.
- Notable individuals killed during the Kaprun disaster:
  - Josef Schaupper, 37, Austrian deaf alpine skier.
  - Sandra Schmitt, 19, German freestyle skier and Olympian (1998).

=== 12 ===
- Halvar Björk, 72, Swedish actor, lung cancer.
- John Bury, 75, British set designer, costume designer and lighting designer.
- Goingback Chiltoskey, 93, Cherokee woodcarver and model maker.
- Christo Coetzee, 71, South African assemblage, colorectal cancer.
- Wim Cohen, 77, Dutch mathematician.
- Philip Campbell Curtis, 93, American painter.
- Eugene Antonio Marino, 66, American Roman Catholic prelate, heart attack.
- Frances Mercer, 85, American film actress.
- Franck Pourcel, 87, French composer, arranger, and conductor, Parkinson's disease.
- Leah Rabin, 72, wife of Israeli Prime Minister Yitzhak Rabin, lung cancer.
- Frank Testa, 97, American Olympic cyclist (1932).

=== 13 ===
- Menachem Ashkenazi, 66, Israeli international football referee.
- Ramón Campbell, 89, Chilean medical doctor, ethnomusicologist, and composer.
- Ralph Bingham Cloward, 92, American neurosurgeon.
- Wilbert Delaney, 78, Canadian ice hockey player.
- Gheorghe Ghimpu, 63, Romanian politician and political prisoner, traffic collision.
- Vilhelm Møller, 78, Danish Olympic gymnast (1948).
- Audrey Stubbart, 105, American centenarian and oldest known full-time employee.
- Jim Wise, 81, American musical composer.

=== 14 ===
- Jimmy Dean, 75, American baseball player.
- Len Gabrielson, 85, American baseball player (Philadelphia Phillies).
- Altaf Gauhar, 77, Pakistani writer, journalist, and poet, prostate cancer.
- Wiesław Gawłowski, 50, Polish volleyball player, coach, and Olympian (1972, 1976, 1980), traffic collision.
- Bob Kitterman, 77, American basketball player (Syracuse Nationals).
- Gérard Laprise, 75, Canadian politician, member of the House of Commons of Canada (1962-1979).
- Otto Przywara, 86, German Olympic swimmer (1936).
- Earl W. Renfroe, 93, American dentist and orthodontics pioneer.
- Pietro Rimoldi, 89, Italian cyclist.
- Robert Trout, 91, American broadcast news reporter.

=== 15 ===
- Edoardo Agnelli, 46, Italian football club director and son of industrialist Gianni Agnelli, suicide by jumping. (body discovered on this date)
- Max Archimowitz, 80, German politician.
- Ju-Chin Chu, 80, Chinese-American chemical engineer.
- Bobby Collier, 70, American gridiron football player (Los Angeles Rams).
- Barry Francis Collins, 62, Australian Roman Catholic prelate.
- G. V. Desani, 91, British-Indian novelist, poet, and social commentator.
- Bernard Gadney, 91, English rugby player.
- Mushtaq Gazdar, 60, Pakistani cinematographer.
- Václav Horák, 88, Czech football player and manager.
- Rinaldo Martino, 79, Italian-Argentine soccer player.
- Pietro Pasinati, 90, Italian football player and manager.
- Joseph Robert Shoenfield, 73, American mathematical logician.
- Jens Jørgen Thorsen, 68, Danish artist, director, and jazz musician.
- Harry Webb, 92, Australian politician.
- Simon Wigg, 40, English speedway rider, brain tumour.

=== 16 ===
- Iosif Andriasov, 67, Soviet composer.
- Joe C., 26, American rapper, musician and hype man, complications from celiac disease.
- Russ Conway, 75, English popular music pianist.
- Josef Ertl, 75, German politician, complications from burn injuries.
- Ahmet Kaya, 43, Turkish folk singer, heart attack.
- DJ Screw, 29, American DJ and rapper, codeine overdose.
- Irmantas Stumbrys, 28, Lithuanian football player, suicide by gunshot.
- Athanasius, Metropolitan of Beni Suef, 77, Egyptian Coptic Orthodox bishop.
- Hosea Williams, 74, American civil rights leader, scientist, and politician, cancer.

=== 17 ===
- Mikael Björnberg, 35, Finnish physicist, plane crash.
- Paul W. Brown, 85, American lawyer.
- Edith DeVoe, 79, American nurse, lung cancer.
- Francis Jennings, 82, American historian.
- William J. Murnane, 55, American egyptologist and author.
- Louis Néel, 95, French physicist.
- Hans Scherenberg, 90, German automobile engineer and executive (Daimler Benz).
- Bim Sherman, 50, Jamaican musician.
- Aleksandar Zorić, 75, Yugoslav and Serbian racing cyclist.

=== 18 ===
- Konstantin Krizhevsky, 74, Soviet Russian football player and Olympian (1952).
- Jaap van der Leck, 89, Dutch football manager.
- Hubert Miller, 82, American bobsledder and Olympian (1952, 1956).
- Lochlainn O'Raifeartaigh, 67, Irish physicist in the field of theoretical particle physics.
- Emin Sabitoglu, 63, Azerbaijani film music composer.
- Jack Sewell, 87, British cricketer
- Kim Spalding, 84, American film, television and theatre actor.
- Ilya Starinov, 100, Soviet military officer.
- Torstein Tynning, 68, Norwegian politician.

=== 19 ===
- George Cosmas Adyebo, 53, Ugandan politician and economist, cancer.
- Robert Escarpit, 82, French academic, writer and journalist.
- Helmut Janz, 66, German Olympic hurdler (1960).
- Charles Ruff, 61, American lawyer, heart attack.
- James Russell Wiggins, 96, United States Ambassador to the United Nations.

=== 20 ===
- Courtney Atherly, 52, Guyanese boxer and Olympian (1972).
- Morris Barry, 82, British television producer.
- Gaylord Carter, 95, American organist and film score composer, Parkinson's disease.
- Marcus Clarke, 88, Australian medical doctor.
- Nikolay Dollezhal, 101, Czech-Soviet nuclear physicist.
- Carolyn Craven, 55, American journalist.
- Barbara Janiszewska, 63, Polish middle-distance runner and Olympic medalist (1956, 1960, 1964).
- Vyacheslav Kotyonochkin, 73, Soviet/Russian animation director, animator and artist.
- Mike Muuss, 42, American computer programmer (software utility Ping), traffic collision.
- Kalle Päätalo, 81, Finnish novelist, lung cancer.

=== 21 ===
- Cyril Clarke, 93, British physician, geneticist and entomologist.
- David Croom-Johnson, 85, British barrister and judge.
- Frank Dennis, 93, English cricketer.
- Cliff Foenander, 66, Sri Lankan musician.
- Zygmunt Gadecki, 62, Polish football player and Olympian (1960).
- Joe Gasparella, 73, American football player (Pittsburgh Steelers, Chicago Cardinals).
- Hans-Wilhelm Koepcke, 86, German zoologist, ornithologist, and herpetologist.
- Harald Leipnitz, 74, German actor, lung cancer.
- Ernest Lluch, 63, Spanish economist and politician, shot.
- Åke Pettersson, 74, Finnish football player and Olympian (1952).
- Emil Zátopek, 78, Czech runner and Olympic champion (1948, 1952, 1956), stroke.

=== 22 ===
- Mammadali Abbasov, 93, Azerbaijani-Soviet statesman.
- Caroline Benn, 74, American educationalist and writer, breast cancer.
- Willie Dee Bowles, 88, American educator and historian.
- Carlos Cardoso, Mozambican journalist, shot.
- Betty Ann Dittemore, 81, American politician.
- Jack Dyson, 66, British cricketer and footballer.
- Fritz Fend, 80, German aeronautical engineer, stroke.
- Chico Gordo, 51, Angolan footballer.
- Erkki Heikkilä, 76, Finnish Olympic field hockey player (1952).
- Doug Hepburn, 74, Canadian strongman and weightlifter, perforated ulcer.
- David Hermelin, 63, American diplomat, ambassador to Norway, brain tumor.
- Placido Herrera, 73, Mexican Olympic cyclist (1948).
- Alick Jeffrey, 61, English football player.
- Christian Marquand, 73, French director, actor and screenwriter, Alzheimer's disease.
- Naresh Mehta, 78, Indian writer.
- Yoshihiro Momota, 54, Japanese professional wrestler and ring announcer, liver failure.
- Théodore Monod, 98, French naturalist, explorer, and humanist.
- Kenneth Peacock, 78, Canadian ethnomusicologist, composer, and pianist.
- Peter Smessaert, 92, Belgian-born American Olympic cyclist (1928).
- Gerald Soffen, 74, American NASA scientist and educator.

=== 23 ===
- Conrad Voss Bark, 87, British writer and journalist.
- Denise Batcheff, 94, French film editor.
- Florence Bell, 87, British biochemist and academic.
- Marjorie Brown, 89, American basketball businesswoman.
- John deBarbadillo, 91, American swim coach.
- Robert E. Kneece, 66, American politician.
- William David Knowles, 92, Canadian politician, member of the House of Commons of Canada (1968-1979).
- Michel De Meulemeester, 57, Belgian Olympic rower (1964).
- Elma Mitchell, 81, British poet.
- Brian Rawlinson, 69, English actor and screenwriter.
- Rayner Unwin, 74, British publisher, cancer.
- Bernard Vorhaus, 95, American film director.

=== 24 ===
- Félix Erviti Barcelona, 90, Spanish Roman Catholic priest.
- Slavko Barbarić, 54, Croatian writer, poet, and Catholic priest.
- Carla Capponi, 81, Italian partisan and politician.
- Salvador "Bubby" Dacer, 66, Filipino publicist, strangulation.
- Bill Devin, 85, American businessperson, automotive entrepreneur and racing driver.
- Paul Lyneham, 55, Australian journalist and television presenter, lung cancer.
- Wasantha Sandanayake, 83, Sri Lankan singer.
- Mohammad Aslam Watanjar, Afghan general and politician, cancer.

=== 25 ===
- Hugh Alexander, 83, American professional baseball player (Cleveland Indians), and scout.
- Marcus Bierich, 74, German businessman.
- Canito, 44, Spanish football player, drug overdose.
- Frederick Cass, 87, Canadian politician.
- James Deetz, 70, American anthropologist.
- Mario Giacomelli, 75, Italian photographer and photojournalist.
- Florizel Glasspole, 91, Jamaican Governor-General.
- Raymond Janot, 83, French politician.
- Charles Keeble, 66, Australian Olympic figure skater (1956).
- Zdzisław Nowak, 72, Polish ice hockey player and Olympian (1956).
- Austin Rawlinson, 98, British swimmer and Olympian (1924).
- Gerd Vespermann, 74, German actor.
- Zaw Weik, 89, Burmese Olympic weightlifter (1936).

=== 26 ===
- Ray Ainsworth, 76, Australian rugby league player.
- Ralph Bates, 101, British novelist.
- Piet Biesiadecki, 80, American bobsledder and Olympian (1956).
- Otto Bittelmann, 89, German politician and member of the Bundestag.
- Paddy Donegan, 77, Irish politician.
- Zentaro Kosaka, 88, Japanese politician, renal failure.
- Carlo Simi, 76, Italian set- and costume designer and architect.
- Leanne Tiernan, 16, English schoolgirl, strangled.
- Sebastiano Timpanaro, 77, Italian classical philologist, essayist, and literary critic.

=== 27 ===
- Anne Barton, 76, American actress.
- Malcolm Bradbury, 68, British author and literary critic.
- Elena Cernei, 76, Romanian operatic mezzo-soprano and musicologist.
- Clara Chiano, 79, American baseball player.
- Raimundas Čivilis, 41, Lithuanian basketball player, tuberculosis.
- Willie Cunningham, 75, Scottish footballer.
- Morton Dimondstein, 80, American painter and sculptor.
- Ferry Petterson, 62, Dutch footballer.
- Harold Tinker, 95, American baseball player.
- Viji, 34, Indian actress, suicide.
- George Wells, 91, American screenwriter and producer.
- Dorothy Woolfolk, 87, American comic book editor (Superman).

=== 28 ===
- Gregg Barton, 88, American actor.
- Robert Bentley, 93, American animator.
- Carol Bolt, 59, Canadian playwright, liver cancer.
- Michael Cramer, 70, German actor.
- Mel Brock, 85, Australian footballer.
- Marshall Edwards, 85, American football player (Brooklyn Dodgers).
- Henry B. González, 84, American Democratic politician (House of Representatives member from Texas 1961-1999).
- Liane Haid, 105, Austrian actress.
- Bernard Lutic, 57, French cinematographer, plane crash.
- Len Shackleton, 78, English footballer ("Clown Prince of Soccer").
- Vadim Shikarev, 32, Kazakhstani Olympic archer (1992, 1996, 2000).

=== 29 ===
- Juul Bosmans, 86, Belgian hurdler and Olympian (1936).
- Andrei Chistyakov, 51, Russian conductor.
- Gianfranco Ciaurro, 71, Italian politician.
- Marvel Cooke, 97, American journalist, writer, and civil rights activist, leukemia.
- Margaret Early, 80, American film actress, congestive heart failure.
- Lee Fogolin, Sr., 73, Canadian ice hockey player (Detroit Red Wings, Chicago Black Hawks).
- Farideh Ghotbi, 80, Iranian public figure, Alzheimer's disease.
- Lou Groza, 76, American football player (Cleveland Browns) and member of the Pro Football Hall of Fame, heart attack.
- Liam Hamilton, 72, Irish judge, Chief Justice (1994-2000).
- Nace Mattingly, 79, American racing driver.
- Ilmar Merkle III, 78, Estonian poet and publicist.
- Tom Sealy, 79, American basketball player.

=== 30 ===
- Vladimir Anić, 70, Croatian linguist and lexicographer, prostate cancer.
- Lady Elizabeth Basset, 92, English author and courtier.
- Olga Bogaevskaya, 85, Soviet and Russian painter and graphic artist.
- Charles Borrett, 84, English Anglican priest.
- Charles Ching, 65, Hong Kong judge.
- Emory L. Cowen, 73-74, American psychologist, leukemia.
- Edward Bridge Danson Jr., 84, American anthropologist.
- Róbert Gönczi, 41, Hungarian Olympic boxer (1980).
- Ted Grabinski, 84, American football player (Pittsburgh Pirates/Steelers).
- Jānis Kalniņš, 96, Latvian-Canadian composer and conductor.
- Kiyotaka Katsuta, 52, Japanese serial killer and thief, execution by hanging.
- Ansumane Mané, Bissau-Guinean soldier and rebel, assassinated.
- Eloise Jarvis McGraw, 84, American author, cancer.
- Gerhard Schedl, 43, Austrian composer, suicide by gunshot.
- Ted Scruggs, 77, American football player (Brooklyn Dodgers).
- Scott Smith, 45, Canadian rock bassist (Loverboy), drowned.
- Karl Stangl, 70, Austrian sailor, plane crash.
- Skeets Tolbert, 91, American jazz musician and bandleader.
