= Percival Bailey =

American neuropathologist, neurosurgeon and psychiatrist

- Born: May 9, 1892
- Died: August 10, 1973 (aged 81)
- Education: Southern Illinois Normal University, University of Chicago, Northwestern University
- Spouse: Yevnigé Bashian
- Awards: Guggenheim Fellowship (1925); Arthur Tracy Cabot Fellow (1920-21)
- Scientific career
- Fields: neuropathology, neurosurgery, psychiatry
- Workplaces: Peter Bent Brigham Hospital, University of Chicago, Cook County Hospital, University of Illinois at Chicago
- Notable students: Paul Bucy, A. Earl Walker, Leo M. Davidoff, Bernard Pertuiset, Ralph Bingham Cloward, Karl H. Pribram, Clovis Vincent, Sidney Gross

Percival Sylvester Bailey (May 9, 1892 – August 10, 1973) was an American neuropathologist, neurosurgeon and psychiatrist who was a native of rural southern Illinois.

He originally studied to become a teacher at Southern Illinois Normal University, but transferred to the University of Chicago in 1912, where he became interested in neurology. In 1918 he graduated from Northwestern University in Evanston, and in 1919 became an assistant to Harvey Cushing at Peter Bent Brigham Hospital in Boston. In 1928 he became head of the neurosurgical department at the University of Chicago, and in 1939 was professor of neurology and neurological surgery at the University of Illinois Chicago. From 1951 he was director of the Illinois State Psychiatric Institute.

Percival Bailey is remembered for his collaborative work with Harvey Cushing, and his important work involving the classification of brain tumors, which prior to his research was in a state of disarray and confusion. From 1922 to 1925, Bailey performed extensive pathological and histological studies of brain tumors, and based on cellular configuration, he created a classification system of thirteen categories. In 1927, he reduced the number of categories to ten.

In 1925, Bailey identified a mid-cerebellar glioma that is usually associated with childhood called a medulloblastoma, of which he published an important paper with Cushing titled Medulloblastoma Cerebelli. The two doctors are credited with coining the term "hemangioblastoma".

With Paul Bucy (1904-1992), Bailey made investigations involving the structure of intracranial tumors and meningeal tumors. The two men were able to confirm that a specific type of tumor (now known as an oligodendroglioma) consisted of oligodendroglia. With Gerhardt von Bonin (1890-1979), Bailey authored two works, "The Neocortex of the Chimpanzee" in 1950 and "The Isocortex of Man" in 1951, which provided an accurate description concerning the cytoarchitecture of the cerebral cortex.

As a psychiatrist, Bailey was a vocal critic of Freudian psychology, which he considered speculative and unscientific. In 1965, he published a book about Freud titled "Sigmund The Unserene".
