= Katherine Young (centenarian) =

Chinese-American centenarian (1901–2005)

- Born: May 10, 1901; Fujian, Qing Empire
- Died: October 24, 2005 (aged 104); Palo Alto, California, U.S.
- Education: Yenching University
- Spouse: Paul T. J. Young
- Relatives: Andrew Lih (grandson)

Katherine Young
- Traditional Chinese: 鄭珣
- Simplified Chinese: 郑珣
Transcriptions
Standard Mandarin
- Hanyu Pinyin: Zhèng Xún
- Wade–Giles: Cheng4 Hsün2

Katherine Young (Chinese: 鄭珣; pinyin: Zhèng Xún) (May 10, 1901 – October 24, 2005) was an American centenarian who, at the age of 102 in 2003, gained publicity when she was described as the oldest known living user of the Internet.

== Biography ==
Born in a small Hakka village in the Fujian province during the final years of Late Imperial China, she attended Yenching University in the capital, then referenced as Peking. Raising four daughters with her husband, Paul T. J. Young, she lived through the tumultuous 1920s, along with the death and destruction of the Sino-Japanese War and World War II during the 1930s and 1940s. At war's end, with Mao Zedong's Communist armies poised to take over, the family escaped to Hong Kong, then Taiwan, and, in 1958, when Katherine Young was 57 years old, immigrated to the United States, settling in the California charter city of Palo Alto, along the San Francisco Bay Area.

In 1998, aged 97, and having served as president of the Rose Club in Palo Alto's Lytton Gardens Senior Communities, she decided to try something new and signed up for the retirement community's 12-week computer class which aimed to teach seniors how to use WebTV. By the conclusion of these sessions, she was logging on and became an activist for the cause of encouraging elders to use the Internet. A Pew Internet and American Life Project study showed that only 18% of Americans 65 and older get online, as opposed to 58% of the American population as a whole.

Five years later, on her 102nd birthday, she became a celebrity for being the oldest person to surf the Internet. She was feted with numerous birthday emails and an emailed sonogram of her great-grandson, who was born in August 2003. She studied Chinese genealogy on Google and, having been Rose Club president for 16 years, researched roses. She used email to communicate with her ten grandchildren and told reporters she checked for new messages as many as six times a day. From her apartment, she accessed the Internet via MSN TV (formerly WebTV) Internet service provider. Microsoft recognized her achievement and gave her a golden lifetime subscription.

Katherine Young died in Palo Alto almost six months past her 104th birthday. It has been noted that although she was considered the oldest known living user of the Internet, Audrey Stubbart who, until very shortly before her death five years earlier, in 2000, at age 105, was a columnist, copyeditor and proofreader for the Missouri newspaper Independence Examiner, used the then-early Internet at a slightly more-advanced age.
