= Ted Danson =

American actor (born 1947)

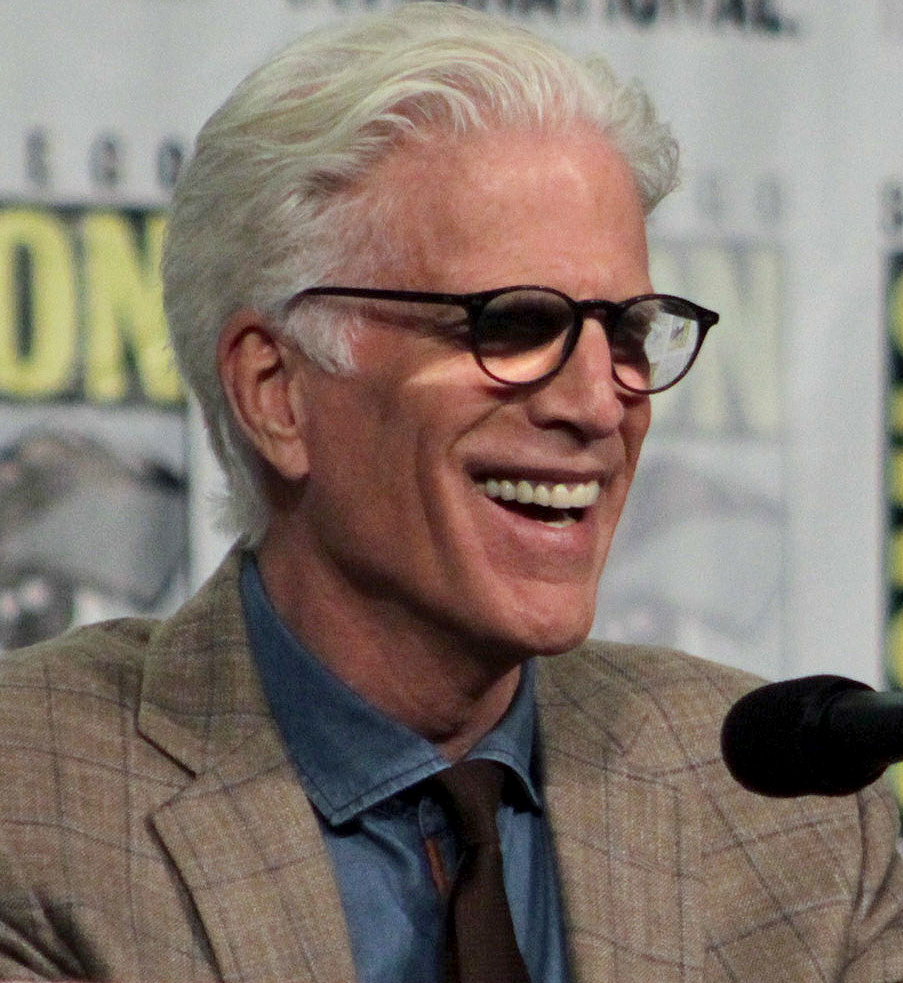
- Danson in 2018
- Born: Edward Bridge Danson III; December 29, 1947 (age 78); San Diego, California, U.S.
- Education: Carnegie Mellon University (BFA)
- Occupation: Actor
- Years active: 1975–present
- Political party: Democratic
- Spouses: Randall Gosch (m. 1970; div. 1975); Cassandra Coates (m. 1977; div. 1993); Mary Steenburgen (m. 1995)
- Children: 2
- Relatives: Charlie McDowell (stepson); Lily Collins (stepdaughter-in-law)

Edward Bridge Danson III (born December 29, 1947) is an American actor. He played the lead character Sam Malone on the NBC sitcom Cheers (1982–1993), for which he received two Primetime Emmy Awards and two Golden Globe Awards. He was further Emmy-nominated for the FX legal drama Damages (2007–2010) and the NBC comedy The Good Place (2016–2020). He received the 2025 Carol Burnett Award.

Danson made his film debut in 1978 in the crime drama The Onion Field. His breakout film role was in the comedies Three Men and a Baby (1987) and Three Men and a Little Lady (1990). He also acted in Body Heat (1981), Creepshow (1982), Dad (1989), and Saving Private Ryan (1998).

Danson's other leading roles on television include the CBS sitcom Becker (1998–2004) and the CBS dramas CSI: Crime Scene Investigation (2011–2015) and CSI: Cyber (2015–2016). In 2015, he starred in the second season of FX's anthology series Fargo. He has played roles in the HBO comedies Curb Your Enthusiasm (2000–2024) and Bored to Death (2009–2011), the NBC sitcom Mr. Mayor (2021–2022), and the Netflix comedy A Man on the Inside (2024–present).

Danson has been married to actress Mary Steenburgen since 1995. They were awarded the Bob Hope Humanitarian Award in 2025 at the 77th Primetime Emmy Awards. Danson is also known for his longtime activism in ocean conservation and wrote Oceana: Our Endangered Oceans and What We Can Do to Save Them (2011) with journalist Michael D'Orso.

== Early life and education ==
On December 29, 1947, Danson was born in San Diego to Edward Bridge "Ned" Danson Jr., an archaeologist and curator of the Museum of Northern Arizona from 1959 to 1975, and Jessica Harriet (née MacMaster). He has an older sister, Jessica Ann "Jan" Haury. Danson was primarily raised in Flagstaff, Arizona. He has English and Scottish heritage. Their ancestors lived in colonial New England and are descended from historical figures such as Anne Hutchinson.

In 1961, at age 14, Danson enrolled at the Kent School, a university-preparatory school in Connecticut; he was a star player on the basketball team. He became interested in drama while later attending Stanford University. In search of a better acting program, he transferred to Carnegie Mellon University in Pittsburgh, Pennsylvania. He graduated with a B.F.A. in Drama in 1972.

== Career ==
=== 1975–1981: Early roles ===
Danson began his television career as a contract player on the daytime soap opera Somerset. He played the role of Tom Conway from 1975 to 1976. In 1977, he played Dr. Mitchell Pierson on the daytime soap opera The Doctors, having also appeared earlier in 1975 as another character, Dr. Chuck Weldon. He was also in a number of commercials, most notably as the "Aramis man". His guest appearances on television in the late 1970s and early 1980s include being on Laverne & Shirley, B. J. and the Bear, Family, Benson, Taxi, Magnum, P.I., The Amazing Spider-Man, Tucker's Witch, and Mrs. Columbo. He also appeared in the films The Onion Field (1978, his first film, as the bagpipe-playing Officer Ian Campbell), Body Heat (1981) and Creepshow (1982).

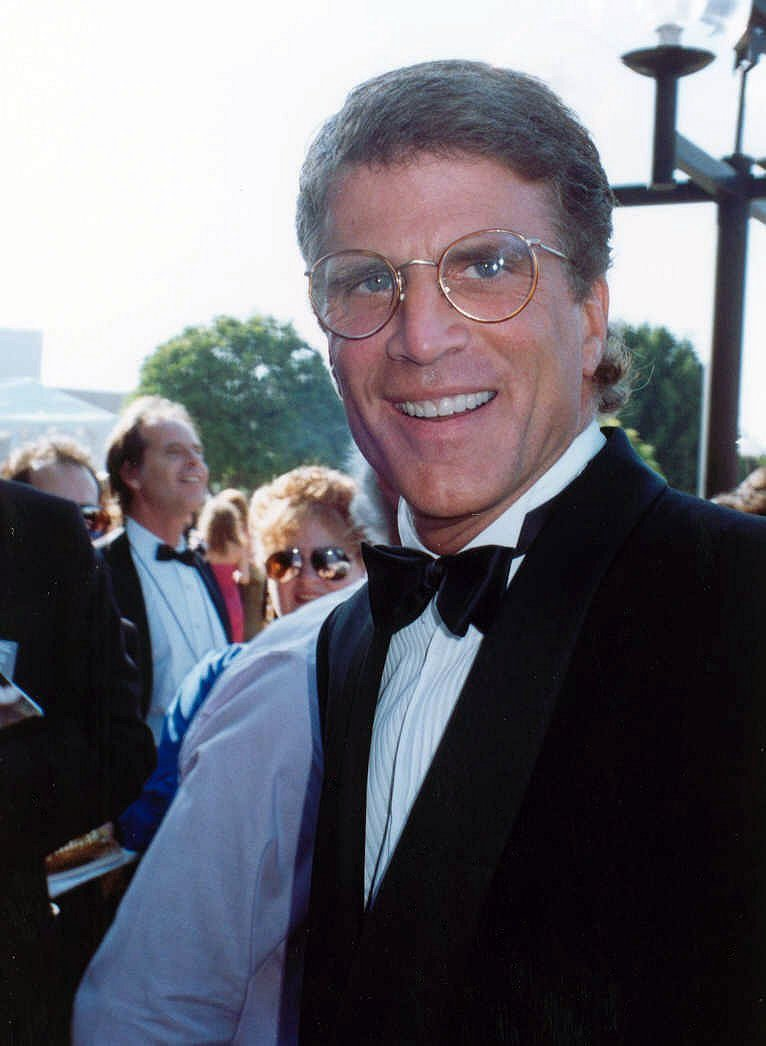
Danson at the 42nd Emmy Awards in 1990

=== 1982–1992: Cheers and stardom ===
In 1982, Danson was cast in the role of Sam Malone, a former local-legend baseball player and bartender, for the NBC sitcom Cheers. On the show, he has an on-again-off-again relationship with the college-educated, sophisticated Diane Chambers. Although the show finished last in ratings in its first season, it was well received by critics. Ratings gradually improved by 1983, and by 1986, Cheers was among the top ten most-viewed shows on television. The series ran for 11 seasons (1982–1993), with the series finale (May 20, 1993) being watched by 80 million people, the second-most watched series finale in television history (in 1993). Cheers won four Emmy Awards for Outstanding Comedy Series, plus a Golden Globe for Best Series–Musical or Comedy. During his time on the show, Danson won two of his 11 consecutive Emmy nominations for the role of Sam Malone, and won two of his nine Golden Globe nominations. In 2002, TV Guide magazine named Cheers the 18th "Greatest Show of All Time". It was included in Time's "100 Greatest Shows of All Time". Danson reprised the role of Sam Malone in a second-season episode of Frasier, and did the voiceover for his character in an episode of The Simpsons, "Fear of Flying".

Danson also appeared in numerous films during his time on the series. His most notable film appearances included Three Men and a Baby (1987) with Tom Selleck and Steve Guttenberg, its sequel Three Men and a Little Lady (1990), and Cousins (1989) with Isabella Rossellini. He also appeared in Creepshow (1982), Little Treasure (1985), Just Between Friends (1986) with Mary Tyler Moore, A Fine Mess (1986), and Dad (1989). Although he was best known for his work in comedy, he also appeared in a television drama, Something About Amelia (1984), about a family devastated by the repercussions of incest, which co-starred his later co-star on Damages, Glenn Close. He won a Golden Globe Award for Best Actor in a Miniseries or Television Movie and was nominated for an Emmy Award.

=== 1994–2014: Post-Cheers roles ===
After Cheers ended, Danson appeared in films such as Made in America (1993), Getting Even with Dad (1994), Loch Ness (1996), Saving Private Ryan (1998), Mad Money (2008), and Big Miracle (2012). In 1996, three years after Cheers concluded, Danson starred in the short-lived CBS sitcom Ink with his real-life wife Mary Steenburgen. In the same year, they starred as Lemuel Gulliver and his wife in an acclaimed television miniseries of Gulliver's Travels. Danson went on to play the title role in the successful CBS sitcom Becker (produced by Paramount Television which also produced Cheers), which ran from 1998 to 2004. Danson also played a fictionalized version of himself on Curb Your Enthusiasm from 2000 to 2024. In 1999, Danson was presented with a star on Hollywood's Walk of Fame.

Danson returned to series television in 2006, playing a psychiatrist in the ABC sitcom Help Me Help You, which was canceled at midseason due to low ratings. Also in 2006, Danson received a nomination for a Screen Actors Guild Award for Outstanding Performance by a Male Actor in a TV Movie or Miniseries for his role in Knights of the South Bronx. In 2007, Danson starred in the FX Network drama Damages as a corrupt billionaire, Arthur Frobisher. The role earned him an Emmy nomination for Outstanding Supporting Actor in a Drama Series, but he lost to co-star Željko Ivanek. During the second season Danson became a recurring character instead of one of the principal cast. He received an Emmy nomination for Outstanding Guest Actor in a Drama Series but lost to Michael J. Fox for Fox's guest appearance in Rescue Me. In 2011, Danson appeared in the music video for "Make Some Noise" by the Beastie Boys. He is also mentioned in the song's lyrics.

From 2009 to 2011, Danson starred in the HBO sitcom Bored to Death as George Christopher, the laconic and sometime downright infantile editor of Edition magazine. Critics often praised Danson as being the highlight of the program, calling his character a "scene stealer." From 2011 to 2015, Danson starred in the CBS police drama CSI: Crime Scene Investigation. He played D.B. Russell, a new graveyard-shift supervisor who previously headed a crime lab in Seattle. Tony Shalhoub, Robin Williams, and John Lithgow were also considered for the role. He reprised his role in the third CSI spin-off, CSI: Cyber, which was canceled after two seasons.

=== 2015–present: The Good Place, Mr. Mayor and further work ===
In 2015, Danson appeared in the second season of the TV show Fargo, portraying Sheriff Hank Larsson. From 2016 to 2020 Danson appeared opposite Kristen Bell as the character Michael in the NBC sitcom The Good Place. He was nominated for and won numerous awards for his performance as Michael. Danson had the main role on the NBC sitcom Mr. Mayor (2021–2022), in which he plays a wealthy businessman who runs for mayor of Los Angeles for all the wrong reasons. Episode 109 of the Beef and Dairy Network Podcast, entitled "Ted Danson", features Danson playing an alternate version of himself (referred to as "The Actor Ted Danson") seeking to collect on a debt of 460 million tons of grain.

In 2024, he starred as the leading role of Charles in the Netflix comedy series, A Man on the Inside, based on the 2020 Academy Award-nominee documentary The Mole Agent. He was nominated for a Golden Globe Award for Best Actor – Television Series Musical or Comedy and a Screen Actors Guild Award for Outstanding Actor in a Comedy Series for the first season. As of 2024, Danson has appeared as a regular in twelve television shows, reportedly the most any actor has done historically. In 2024, he became the official spokesperson for Consumer Cellular, a telephone company. Also in 2024, Danson and Woody Harrelson started a Team Coco podcast called Where Everybody Knows Your Name where they interview celebrities about their lives and careers. Danson voiced Ralph Waldo Emerson in the 2026 PBS documentary Henry David Thoreau.

== Personal life ==
=== Marriages and relationships ===
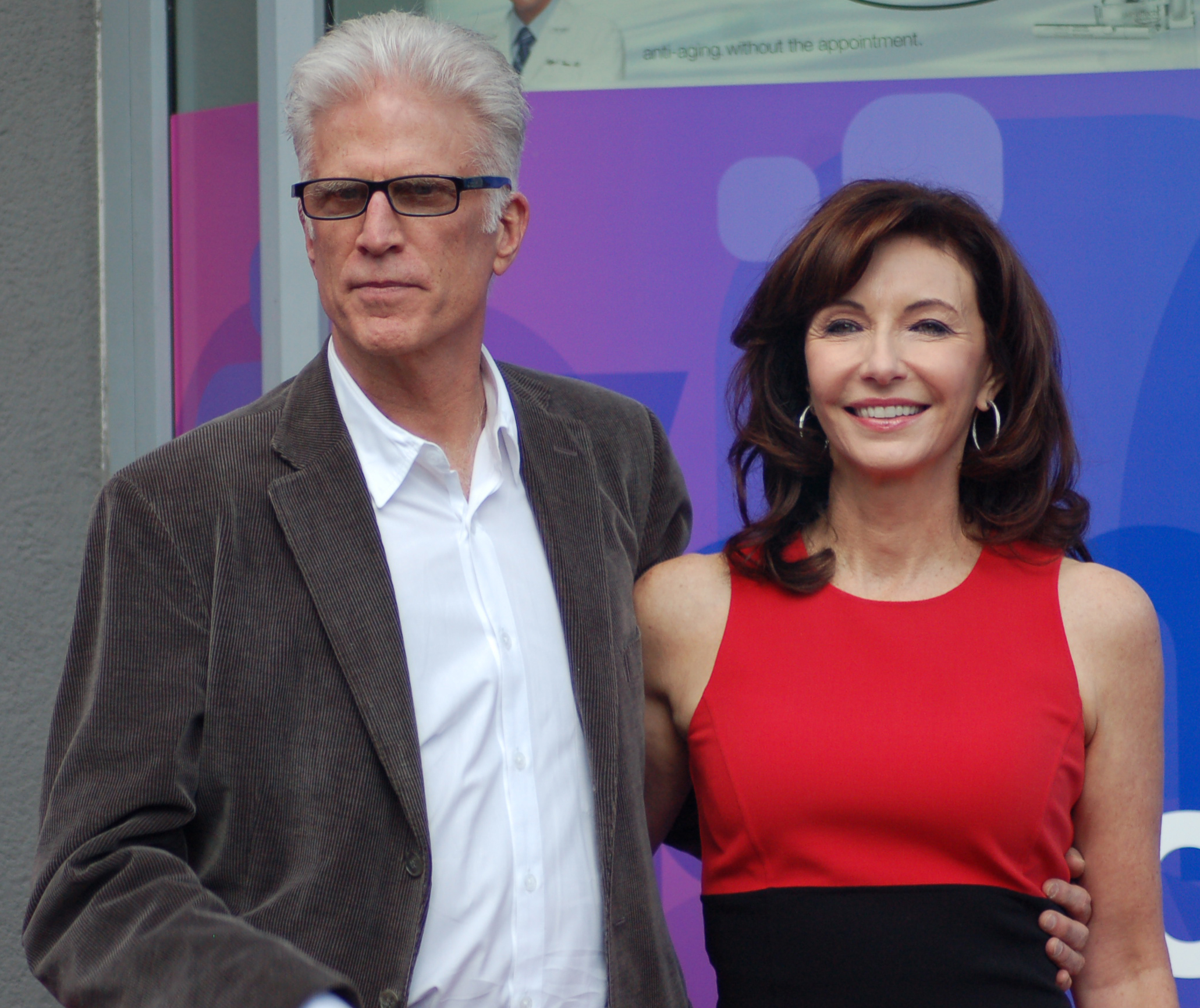
Danson with wife Mary Steenburgen in December 2009

Danson and his first wife, actress Randall "Randy" Gosch (known as Randy Danson), were married in 1970 and divorced in 1975.

Danson's second wife was producer Cassandra "Casey" Coates, whom he married in 1977. On December 24, 1979, while giving birth to their first daughter, Kate, Coates suffered a stroke. Danson spent several years caring for her and helping her recuperate. They later adopted a second daughter, Katrina. His affair with actress Whoopi Goldberg contributed to their divorce in 1993. At the time, it was known as one of Hollywood's costliest divorces and reportedly cost Danson $30 million.

==== Whoopi Goldberg ====
While a guest on The Arsenio Hall Show in late 1988, he met actress Whoopi Goldberg; he described her as "a sexy, funny woman". They became friends and were in Help Save Planet Earth in 1990 which is about saving the environment (Danson played himself, Goldberg portrayed Mother Earth). While making Made in America in April 1992, the two became romantically involved, a pairing that was heavily featured in gossip tabloids such as the National Enquirer. The couple also appeared on the Rock the Vote TV special in the same year; they were set to star in a Paramount-produced version of Neal Barrett Jr.'s Pink Vodka Blues, written by Marshall Brickman.

Danson received negative press attention on October 8, 1993, after his appearance wearing blackface at a Friars Club comedy roast in honor of Goldberg, and for using many racist slurs. Later, Goldberg defended the sketch, explaining that she had helped write much of the material and referred Danson to the makeup artist who painted his face as a societal critique.

==== Mary Steenburgen ====
On October 7, 1995, Danson married actress Mary Steenburgen, whom he met on the set of Pontiac Moon in 1993, and became the stepfather to Steenburgen's children, Lilly and Charlie, from her previous marriage to actor Malcolm McDowell.

Danson has been on a plant-based diet multiple times, but as of 2016, he is on a pescetarian diet.

Danson is Episcopalian.

=== Environmentalism ===
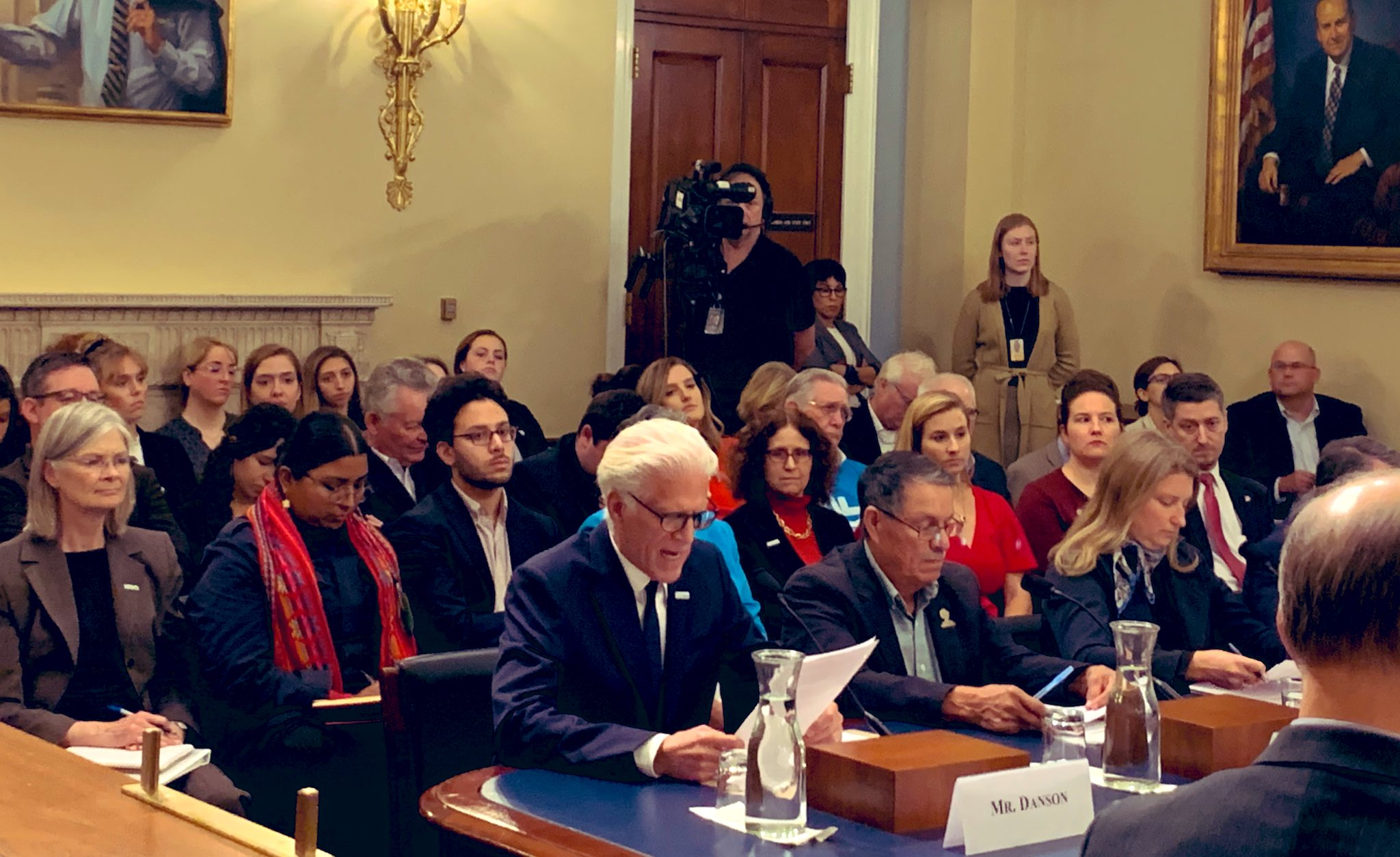
Danson testifying at a United States House Committee on Natural Resources session about plastic in 2019

Danson's interest in environmental concerns began when he was 12 years old. Bill Breed, then curator of geology at the Museum of Northern Arizona, introduced Danson and their friend Marc Gaede to a "game" he referred to as "billboarding". Armed with axes and saws, Breed, Gaede, and Danson destroyed over 500 outdoor advertising signs.

Danson's interest in environmentalism continued over the years, and he began to be concerned with the state of the world's oceans. He was a contributing founder of the American Oceans Campaigns in the 1980s; it merged with Oceana in 2001 and he is a board member. His commitment to the environment led him to host the A&E television series "Challenge of the Seas" in 1991, filming 26 one-hour episodes.

In March 2011, Danson published his first book, Oceana: Our Endangered Oceans and What We Can Do to Save Them which was written with journalist Michael D'Orso. On October 25, 2019, Danson was arrested and charged along with actress Jane Fonda at a climate-change protest outside the United States Capitol in Washington, D.C.

=== Political activism ===
Danson is a friend of former President Bill Clinton, who attended Danson and Steenburgen's wedding. Danson has donated over $177,000 as of June 2024 to Democratic candidates and PACs, including Kamala Harris, Joe Biden, Barack Obama, Al Gore, John Edwards, Barbara Boxer, Bill Clinton, Al Franken, John Kerry, and the Jane Fonda Climate PAC. He has also donated to the Democratic Party of Arkansas and the Democratic Senatorial Campaign Committee. Danson and Steenburgen campaigned for Senator Hillary Clinton during her 2008 presidential campaign. He and Steenburgen attended the wedding of Bill Clinton and Hillary Clinton's daughter Chelsea on July 31, 2010. He appeared with Steenburgen at the 2016 Democratic National Convention. On October 3, 2016, he attended the opening of Hillary Clinton's new campaign office in Lancaster, Pennsylvania at the old Queen Pharmacy on King Street.

== Filmography ==
=== Film ===
Year	Title	Role	Notes
1979	The Onion Field	Det. Ian James Campbell	
1981	Body Heat	Peter Lowenstein	
1982	Creepshow	Harry Wentworth	
1985	Little Treasure	Eugene Wilson	
1986	Just Between Friends	Chip Davis	
1986	How Can I Tell If I'm Really in Love	Himself	
1986	A Fine Mess	Spence Holden	
1987	Three Men and a Baby	Jack Holden	
1988	She's Having a Baby	Himself	Uncredited cameo
1989	Cousins	Larry Kozinski	
1989	Dad	John Tremont	
1990	Three Men and a Little Lady	Jack Holden	
1993	Made in America	Hal Jackson	
1994	Getting Even with Dad	Raymond Gleason	
1994	Pontiac Moon	Washington Bellamy	
1996	Loch Ness	John Dempsey	
1998	Jerry and Tom	Guy	
1998	Homegrown	Gianni Saletzzo	
1998	Saving Private Ryan	Capt. Fred Hamill	
1999	Mumford	Jeremy Brockett	
2004	Fronterz	—N/a	
2007	Nobel Son	Harvey Parrish	
2007	The Amateurs	Moose	
2008	Mad Money	Don Cardigan	
2008	The Human Contract	E.J. Winters	
2009	The Open Road	Coach	
2011	Jock the Hero Dog	Pezulu	Voice only
2012	Big Miracle	J.W. McGrath	
2012	Ted	Himself	Uncredited
2014	The One I Love	Therapist	
2018	Hearts Beat Loud	Dave	
2020	Best Summer Ever	—N/a	Executive producer

=== Television ===
Year	Title	Role	Notes
1975–1976	Somerset	Tom Conway #2	Unknown episodes
1975, 1977	The Doctors	Dr. Chuck Weldon (1975) / Mitch Pierson (1977)	19 episodes
1979	The Amazing Spider-Man	Major Collings	2 episodes
1979	Mrs. Columbo	Richard Dellinger	Episode: "Ladies of the Afternoon"
1979	Trapper John, M.D.	Injured Man	Episode: "Love Is a Three-Way Street"
1979	B. J. and the Bear	Tom Spencer	Episode: "Silent Night, Unholy Night"
1979	The French Atlantic Affair	Abe Stanley, Assistant to Dr. Clemens	Miniseries, Episode #1.3
1980	The Women's Room	Norman	Television film
1980	Once Upon a Spy	Jack Chenault	Television film
1980	Laverne & Shirley	Randy Carpenter	Episode: "Why Did the Fireman..."
1980	Family	David Bartels	Episode: "Daylight Serenade"
1981	Benson	Dan Slater	2 episodes
1981	Magnum, P.I.	Stewart Crane	Episode: "Don't Say Goodbye"
1981	Dear Teacher	Steve Goodwin	Television film
1981	Our Family Business	Gep	Television film
1982	Taxi	Vincenzo Senaca	Episode: "The Unkindest Cut"
1982	Tucker's Witch	Danny Kirkwood	2 episodes
1982–1993	Cheers	Sam Malone	Main role, 275 episodes
1983	Allison Sydney Harrison	David Harrison	Television film
1983	Cowboy	Dale Weeks	Television film
1984	Something About Amelia	Steven Bennett	Television film
1986	When the Bough Breaks	Alex Delaware	Television film
1987	We Are the Children	—N/a	Television film
1988	Mickey's 60th Birthday	Sam Malone	Television special
1989	Saturday Night Live	Himself (host)	Episode: "Ted Danson/Luther Vandross"
1989	The Jim Henson Hour	Himself	Episode: "Aquatic Life"
1990	The Earth Day Special	Sam Malone	Television special
1994	The Simpsons	Sam Malone (voice)	Episode: "Fear of Flying"
1995	Frasier	Sam Malone	Episode: "The Show Where Sam Shows Up"
1996–1997	Ink	Mike Logan	Main role, 22 episodes
1996	Gulliver's Travels	Lemuel Gulliver	2 episodes
1997	Pearl	Sal	Episode: "The Write Stuff: Part 2"
1998–2004	Becker	Dr. John Becker	Main role, 129 episodes
1998	Thanks of a Grateful Nation	Jim Tuite	Television film
1998	Veronica's Closet	Nick Vanover	Episode: "Veronica's $600,000 Pop"
1999	Diagnosis: Murder	Himself	Episode: "The Roast"
2000–2024	Curb Your Enthusiasm	Himself	Recurring role, 34 episodes
2000	Search for Atlantis	Himself	Television film
2000	Grosse Pointe	Jack the Dog (voice)	Episode: "Sleeping with the Enemy"
2002	Living with the Dead	James Van Praagh	Television film
2003	Gary the Rat	Terry McMillian (voice)	Episode: "Mergers and Acquisions"
2004	It Must Be Love	George Gazelle	Television film
2005	Our Fathers	Mitchell Garabedian	Television film
2005	Knights of the South Bronx	Richard	Television film
2006	Heist	Tom	2 episodes
2006–2007	Help Me Help You	Dr. Bill Hoffman	Main role, 14 episodes
2007–2010	Damages	Arthur Frobisher	Main role, 23 episodes
2008	King of the Hill	Tom Hammond (voice)	Episode: "The Accidental Terrorist"
2009–2011	Bored to Death	George Christopher	Main role, 24 episodes
2010	Tim and Eric Awesome Show, Great Job!	Little Danson Man	Episode: "Greene Machine"
2011–2015	CSI: Crime Scene Investigation	Director D.B. Russell	Main role, 84 episodes
2013	CSI: NY	Director D.B. Russell	Episode: "Seth and Apep"
2015–2016	CSI: Cyber	Director D.B. Russell	Main role, 18 episodes
2015	Fargo	Sheriff Hank Larsson	Main role, 10 episodes
2015–2026	American Dad!	Dr. Ray Petit (voice)	6 episodes
2016–2020	The Good Place	Michael	Main role, 52 episodes
2017	Finding Your Roots	Himself	Episode: "Puritans and Pioneers"
2018–present	Advancements	Himself	79 episodes
2019–2022	The Orville	Admiral Perry	Recurring role (season 2–3), 6 episodes
2021–2022	Mr. Mayor	Mayor Neil Bremer	Main role, 20 episodes
2023	Mulligan	Brad Chadman (voice)	Episode: "Not My President"
2024–present	A Man on the Inside	Charles Nieuwendyk	Main role, 16 episodes
2026	Henry David Thoreau	Ralph Waldo Emerson (voice)	3 episodes
2027	She's Fine		Upcoming series

=== Theatre ===
Year	Title	Role	Venue	Ref.
1973	Status Quo Vadis	Paul Regents III	Brooks Atkinson Theatre, Broadway	

== Bibliography ==
- Danson, Ted (with Michael D'Orso). (March 15, 2011) Oceana: Our Endangered Oceans and What We Can Do to Save Them. New York: Rodale Books. ISBN 978-1605292625
