= Moffatt Burriss =

American businessman and politician (1919–2019)

Member of the South Carolina House of Representatives from the 78th district
- In office 1977–1992
- Preceded by: Robert E. Kneece

Personal details
- Born: Thomas Moffatt Burriss; September 22, 1919 Anderson, South Carolina, US
- Died: January 4, 2019 (aged 99)
- Party: Republican
- Spouse(s): Louisa Hay (d.); Jean Wheelwright
- Children: 4
- Occupation: Contractor

Thomas Moffatt Burriss (September 22, 1919 – January 4, 2019) was an American businessman and politician in the state of South Carolina.

== Biography ==
Burriss was born in Anderson, South Carolina and received his bachelor's degree from Clemson University, He served in the South Carolina House of Representatives as a member of the Republican Party from 1977 to 1992, representing Richland County, South Carolina. He was a general contractor, and was a veteran of World War II.

== World War II ==
Burriss served in the United States Army and achieved the rank of captain. It was reported that he pointed a gun at a British Tank Commander's head after stopping at a failed assault of a bridge, the British Tank Commander hid on the tank and closed the hatch. The British officer in question was Lord Peter Carrington who denied any such exchange took place, and Burriss would have had no seniority nor authority in such matters, characterising Burriss's claims as "bizarre". He participated in Operation Market Garden and came regularly to the Netherlands for commemorations of World War II. In 2009, he received the Zilveren Stadspenning; an award of the city of Nijmegen. The award was for the 82nd Airborne Division, in which he served. The actions of Burriss and the 82nd Airborne Division in Operation Market Garden was the inspiration for the movie A Bridge Too Far (1977). He wrote his war stories down in his memoir "Strike and Hold".
