= Paul Bucy =

American neurosurgeon and neuropathologist

Paul Bucy (/ˈbjuːsi/; November 13, 1904 – September 22, 1992) was an American neurosurgeon and neuropathologist who was a native of Hubbard, Iowa. He is known both for his part in describing the Klüver–Bucy syndrome, his academic life as a teacher in the neurosciences, and for his founding in 1972 and editing Surgical Neurology – An International Journal of Neurosurgery and Neuroscience from 1972 to 1987.

== Academic life ==
Bucy grew up and was educated in Iowa. He received his bachelor's degree, a master's in neuropathology and his doctorate from the University of Iowa. He interned and trained at Ford Hospital in Detroit. He was an assistant to neurosurgeon Percival Bailey (1892–1973) at the University of Chicago. In the early 1930s he traveled to Europe, and studied with Gordon Morgan Holmes (1876–1965) in London and Otfrid Foerster (1874–1941) in Breslau. In 1941, he became Professor of Neurology and Neurological Surgery at the University of Illinois in Chicago, where he spent 13 years. During World War II he was a medical consultant to the U.S. Army.

From 1954 to 1972, he was Professor of Neurosurgery and taught neurosurgical residents at Northwestern University and at Chicago Memorial Hospital. During his long career, Bucy wrote more than 400 papers and books on neurological and neurosurgical subjects. He trained 65 neurosurgeons who went on to practicing neurosurgery worldwide. Bucy served as publisher for 13 years on the Journal of Neurosurgery. In 1972, after moving to Tryon, North Carolina, he was appointed Clinical Professor of Neurology and Neurological surgery at Bowman Gray School of Medicine in Winston-Salem. That same year (1972) Bucy became Founding Editor of Surgical Neurology, a new neurosurgical journal, which he edited until 1987 along with Robert J. White.

He was former president of the American Neurological Association, The Society of Neurological Surgeons and The World Federation of Neurosurgical Societies. Bucy died in 1993 at his home in Tryon, where he had lived with his wife Evelyn, who died a year later in St. Louis.

Paul Bucy is remembered for his work with experimental psychologist Heinrich Klüver (1897-1979) involving the eponymous Klüver–Bucy syndrome, defined as a behavioral disorder caused by malfunction of the left and right medial temporal lobes of the brain. The two men were able to clinically reproduce this disorder in rhesus monkeys by performing bilateral temporal lobectomies. He will also be remembered, along with Percival Bailey, for performing important research of brain tumors, in particular oligodendrogliomas and meningiomas.
