= Amanda Crowe =

Eastern Band Cherokee woodcarver and educator from North Carolina

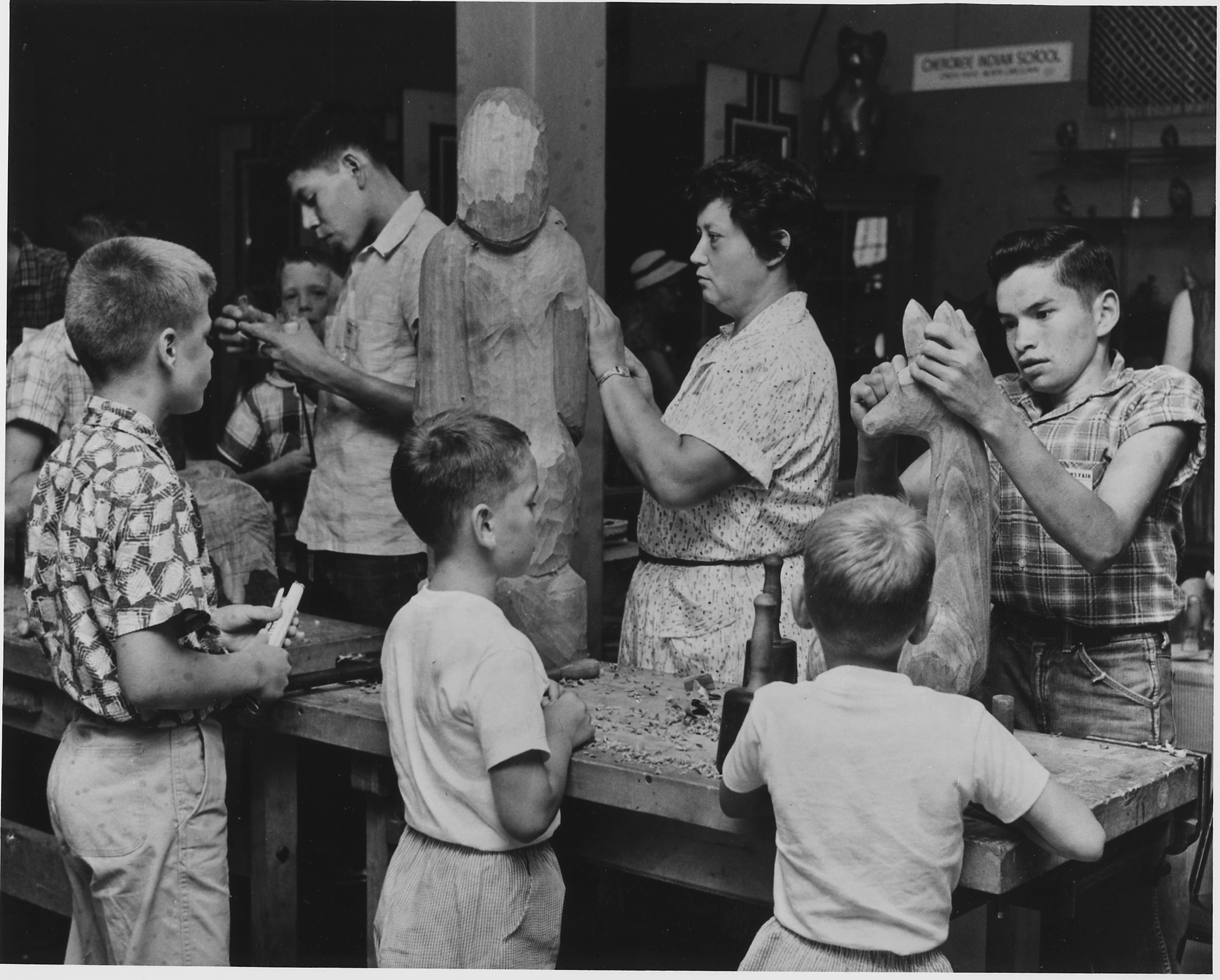
- Amanda Crowe demonstrating woodcarving at the Craftsmen's Fair in Cherokee, North Carolina
- Born: July 16, 1928; Murphy, North Carolina, U.S.
- Died: September 27, 2004 (aged 76); North Carolina, U.S.
- Citizenship: Eastern Band Cherokee and American
- Education: School of the Art Institute of Chicago
- Occupation: Woodcarver

Amanda Crowe (July 16, 1928 – September 27, 2004) was an Eastern Band Cherokee woodcarver and educator from Cherokee, North Carolina, in the United States. A graduate of the School of the Art Institute of Chicago, her work has been widely exhibited and is held by a number of museums. Crowe dedicated much of her career to teaching and training the next generation of Eastern Cherokee artists.

== Early life ==
Crowe was born on July 16, 1928, in Murphy, North Carolina. By the age of four, she had decided to become an artist. Of her childhood, she said: "Every spare minute was spent in carving or studying anything available concerning art ... " At the age of eight, she was already selling her carvings.

Both of Crowe's parents died when she was very young. By the time she reached high school, her foster mother arranged for her to stay in Chicago, where she graduated from Hyde Park High School and attended the School of the Art Institute of Chicago (SAIC). She earned SAIC's John Quincy Adams fellowship for foreign study in 1952, and she chose to study sculpture with Jose De Creeft at the Instituto Allende in San Miguel de Allende, Mexico. Crowe also earned her Master of Fine Arts degree from SAIC that year.

== Art and teaching career ==
"Wooden Bears" in cherry wood, by Amanda Crowe. Largest bear is 7 in. H × 4 in. W × 10 in. L. Bureau of Indian Affairs Department of the Interior collection

In 1953, the Cherokee Historical Association invited Crowe back to North Carolina to teach studio art at Cherokee High School, where her uncle Goingback Chiltoskey was already teaching. She set up a studio in the Paint Town community and taught wood carving for almost four decades to over 2,000 students.

Her sculptures were often animal figures, and she was particularly known for her expressive bears. Her work is streamlined, highly stylized, and smoothly carved. She also worked with stone and clay, but wood was her favorite medium, and she carved with local woods such as wild cherry, buckeye, and black walnut.

Her art is sometimes compared to the work of Willard Stone. Art scholar Esther Bockhoff writes that Crowe was "undoubtedly one of the primary influences on the resurgence of Cherokee carving."

Public collections that own her work include the Cleveland Museum of Natural History, the United States Department of the Interior, and the National Museum of the American Indian. She exhibited her work in such museums as the Art Institute of Chicago, the Atlanta Art Museum, the Denver Art Museum, the Mint Museum of Art in Charlotte, the Asheville Art Museum, and venues in Germany and the United Kingdom. Among many awards, Crowe won the North Carolina Folk Heritage Award in 2000.

She also illustrated the book Cherokee Legends and the Trail of Tears, first published in 1956 and reprinted several times since.

== Death and legacy ==
Crowe died on September 27, 2004. Many of the contemporary Eastern Band Cherokee sculptors today studied under her. On November 9, 2018, Google recognized her with a doodle.
