= Cherokee High School (North Carolina) =

American public school in North Carolina

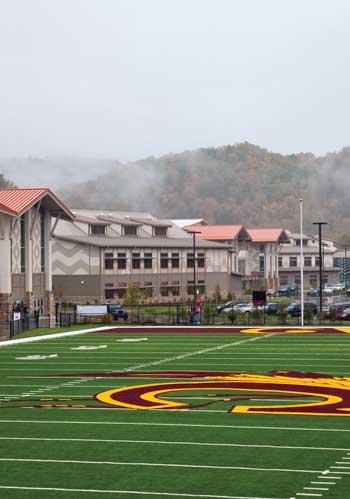
- Cherokee High School football field

Location
- 200 Ravensford Drive; Cherokee, North Carolina 28719; United States; 35°30′47″N 83°17′49″W

Information
- School type: Tribal
- Established: 1975 (51 years ago)
- School district: Cherokee Central Schools
- CEEB code: 340710
- Principal: Woodreen Caldwell
- Teaching staff: 90.67 (FTE)
- Enrollment: 693 (2024–2025)
- Student to teacher ratio: 7.64
- Campus type: Rural
- Colors: Maroon and gold
- Athletics conference: Smoky Mountain Conference
- Mascot: Braves
- Website: chs.ccs-nc.org

Cherokee High School is a Bureau of Indian Education (BIE) grant high school located in Cherokee, North Carolina and administered by the federally recognized Eastern Band of Cherokee Indians. The school was originally housed in an older building, before it moved to a brand new facility, which opened in 2009.

Cherokee High School is part of the Cherokee Central Schools System. It is the only 9–12 high school on Qualla Boundary, and shares a campus with Cherokee Elementary and Cherokee Middle School.

== Accreditation ==
The school is accredited by the Southern Association of Colleges and Schools and by the North Carolina Department of Public Instruction.

== Athletics ==
Cherokee High School is a member of the North Carolina High School Athletic Association (NCHSAA). They have won state championships in football (2017) and three times in girls' basketball (1996, 2024 & 2025).

== Notable faculty ==
- Amanda Crowe
- Goingback Chiltoskey
