= Gurban Sultanov =

Soviet Azerbaijani bureaucrat (1919–1998)

- Qurban Sultanov

Minister of Industrial Construction of the Azerbaijan SSR
- In office 13 November 1969 – 1972
- Preceded by: Mammadali Abbasov
- Succeeded by: Vasili Piatybrat

Chief of the Department of Installation and Special Construction Works of the Council of Ministers of the Azerbaijan SSR
- In office 4 June 1966 – 12 December 1969
- Preceded by: Position established
- Succeeded by: Nariman Isayev

Personal details
- Born: 22 March 1919; Ganja, Azerbaijan
- Died: 30 September 1998 (aged 79)
- Political party: Communist Party of the Soviet Union
- Awards: Order of the Red Banner of Labour Honored Builder of the Azerbaijan SSR

Gurban Jamal oghlu Sultanov (Azerbaijani: Qurban Camal oğlu Sultanov, 22 March 1919 — 30 September 1998) was a Soviet Azerbaijani bureaucrat who was Minister of Industrial Construction of the Azerbaijan SSR (1969–1972).

== Biography ==
Gurban Sultanov was born on 22 March 1919, in the city of Ganja. After graduating from high school, he studied at the Transcaucasian Institute of Railway Engineers in Tbilisi, where he graduated in 1941. He participated in the liberation of Rostov, Taganrog, Nikolaev, Brno, Bratislava, Prague and other cities during the Great Patriotic War of 1941-1945, was discharged from the army in October 1945 as a captain.

After returning from the war, Gurban Sultanov worked as a department head in the Azerbaijan Railway Trade Union Committee in 1946–1948, and as an instructor in the Baku Committee and the Central Committee of the Azerbaijan Communist Party. Later, he returned to production and held responsible positions in the "Azerdeniznefttikinti" system.

Gurban Sultanov, who worked as a manager in the construction organizations of Azerbaijan until 1961, was the Deputy Minister of Construction of Azerbaijan from 1962, the head of the trust No. 3 of the same ministry. Until 1969 he was the head of the Department of Installation and Special Construction of the Council of Ministers of the Azerbaijan SSR, in 1969-1972 he was the Minister of Industrial Construction of the Azerbaijan SSR. From May 1972, he was an engineer of the Azerbaijan Energy Enterprises Construction Trust. For a long time since 1974, he worked as the director of the Baku Slate Plant under the Ministry of Construction Materials Industry of the Azerbaijan SSR.

Gurban Sultanov was a member of the Central Committee of the Communist Party of Azerbaijan and was elected a deputy of the Supreme Soviet of the Azerbaijan SSR (7th-8th convocation). He died on 30 September 1998.

== Awards ==
- Order of the Red Banner of Labour — 1966
- Order of the Red Star
- Order of the Patriotic War (1st, 2nd degree)
- Honored Builder of the Azerbaijan SSR — 1964
