= Ferenc Mayer =

Hungarian footballer

- Born: 7 January 1908; Nagyvárad, Austria-Hungary
- Died: 9 November 2000 (aged 92); Hattenville, Seine-Maritime, France
- Occupation: Footballer

Ferenc Mayer (7 January 1908 at Nagyvarad, Romania – November 9, 2000, at Hattenville, Normandy, France), also known as François Mayer or Ferenc Mayer, was a Hungarian footballer who played as goalkeeper.

== Career ==
Mayer played in Ligue 1 with Cercle Athlétique de Paris from 1932 to 1934. He took penalties for the club. He then played two seasons at Stade Malherbe de Caen. Later, while at Racing Club de Strasbourg, he took part in the final of the 1936-1937 Coupe de France.

He also played for the Hungary national football team (amateur team).

Between 1944 and 1946, he was the coach of Stade Malherbe de Caen.
