= Otto Bittelmann =

German politician (1911–2000)

Member of the Bundestag
- In office 20 October 1969 – 22. September 1972

Personal details
- Born: 5 August 1911 Schönholz
- Died: 26 November 2000 (aged 89) Walsrode, Lower Saxony, Germany
- Party: CDU

Otto Bittelmann (August 5, 1911 – November 26, 2000) was a German politician of the Christian Democratic Union (CDU) and former member of the German Bundestag.

== Life ==
Bittelmann joined the CDU in 1961. He was deputy chairman of the CDU district association Fallingbostel and chairman of the agricultural committee of the CDU district association Lüneburg. Bittelmann was a council member of the municipality Bomlitz and a member of the district council of Fallingbostel. He was a member of the German Bundestag from 1969 to 1972. In parliament he represented the constituency of Hoya.

== Literature ==
Herbst, Ludolf; Jahn, Bruno (2002). Vierhaus, Rudolf (ed.). Biographisches Handbuch der Mitglieder des Deutschen Bundestages. 1949–2002 [Biographical Handbook of the Members of the German Bundestag. 1949–2002] (in German). München: De Gruyter - De Gruyter Saur. p. 1715. ISBN 978-3-11-184511-1.
