= Audrey Stubbart =

American centenarian proofreader and newspaper colimnist (1895–2000)

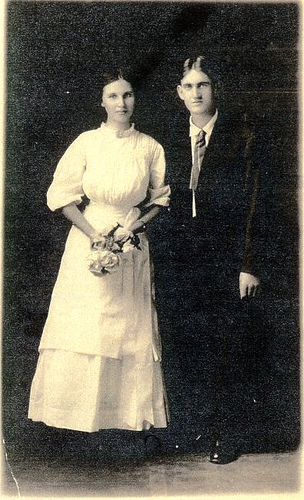
- Audrey and John Stubbart's wedding photo, c. 1911
- Born: Audrey Morford; 9 March 1895
- Died: 13 November 2000 (aged 105)
- Spouse: John Stubbart (m. 1911–1965, his death)
- Children: 5

Audrey Stubbart (June 9, 1895 – November 13, 2000) was an American proofreader and newspaper columnist for The Independence Examiner until the age of 105. Prior to her death she was the oldest verified newspaper columnist, the oldest known full-time employee, and possibly the oldest user of the Internet.

== Early life ==
Stubbart was born Audrey Morford in Newman Grove, Nebraska. She was the second of five siblings, but with the death of her eldest sibling shortly after birth, Audrey became the oldest. She spent her early life in Newman Grove, close to an Indian reservation and could recount early experiences of encountering Sioux Indians in the decades following the 1890 Battle of Wounded Knee.

The Morford family moved to Gordon, Nebraska, when Audrey was young. Soon afterwards, her father died at the age of thirty-six, leaving his wife and four children destitute. Following his death, she and her mother moved along with her siblings to her uncle's house nearby and then, on his death, to the house of their grandparents in Malvern, Iowa.

== Personal life ==
Audrey was married at the age of fifteen to a carpenter, John Stubbart, who was five years older than she. Their marriage lasted fifty-four years. The couple moved to Wyoming, where they had their first child in 1912. They built a log house on the prairie there in 1916, where they lived for the next twenty-eight years. They had two daughters: Enid and Carol; as well as three sons: Veryl, Donald and Kenneth. In June 1964, John suffered a heart attack, and his health apparently failed thereafter. He died at age seventy-five in December 1965.

Audrey was highly religious and taught Sunday school for seventy-five years. A member of the Reorganized Church of Jesus Christ of Latter Day Saints, she detested the former practice of polygamy amongst Utah Mormons, which had only officially ended in 1890, and preached against it just as members of her church had done since its foundation in the 1850s.

== Career as a proofreader ==
In 1944, John and Audrey Stubbart moved to Independence, Missouri, where Audrey found a job as a proofreader with her church's publishing company, the Herald House, on the suggestion of her mother-in-law. Audrey recounted that her initial salary was $18 a week. During this time, Audrey's middle son, Donald, was serving in World War II as a bomber pilot in the U.S. Air Corps. Audrey worked for eighteen years with the Herald House until her retirement in 1961. In that same year, she was recruited as a proofreader by The Examiner. She would eventually spend more than three decades there.

== Oldest full-time employee ==
Audrey became a centenarian on June 9, 1995, thereby inviting worldwide attention. Calls and letters came in from people around the world wanting to listen to her story. At the age of 100, she was still working 40 hours per week at The Examiner. Three years later, she was honored by the US Government for being the oldest full-time employee of any business in the country. Shortly afterwards, at age 103, she wrote what was perhaps her last article for The Examiner. She continued, however, to work in her proofreader's position until August 2000 when she was 105 years and 2 months old.

== Age and death ==
At age eighty-eight, she visited the Holy Land and rode a camel in Egypt. At age ninety-four, she toured England and Scotland. In 1992, at age ninety-seven, she was Missouri's Older Worker of the Year, chosen as a role model who greatly contributed to her community.

As she approached her 101st birthday, she had no plans to retire; her daughter Enid and son-in-law Joe celebrated their 60th wedding anniversary a few days before her 101st birthday. She sang in the choir until she was 102.

In May 2000, at 104, she fell at her home. A month later, she went directly from the hospital to The Examiner celebration for her 105th birthday. She retired in August.

Stubbart died on November 13, 2000, three months after her retirement as proofreader. She was well over 105 years old at that time.

== See also ==
- Katherine Young
- List of centenarians
- List of people from Independence, Missouri
