= The Examiner (Missouri) =

Newspaper in Jackson County, Missouri, US

- Type: Daily newspaper
- Format: Broadsheet
- Owner: CherryRoad Media
- Publisher: Julie Moreno
- Editor: Jeff Fox
- Founded: February 19, 1898, as The Jackson Examiner
- Headquarters: 410 South Liberty Street, Independence, Missouri, United States
- Circulation: 6,750
- OCLC number: 28205230
- Website: examiner.net

The Examiner is the daily newspaper of eastern Jackson County, Missouri, including Independence, Blue Springs and Grain Valley. It is published five days a week – Tuesday through Saturday – and its webpage is at www.examiner.net.

== History ==
The Jackson Examiner was first published as a weekly newspaper in 1898 by Col. William Southern. The daily edition began publication as The Independence Examiner on May 16, 1905. The weekly edition continued to be published alongside the daily edition, until February 1928 when the weekly was discontinued. The official Examiner website was launched in 1996.

Southern and his business partner, Frank Rucker, sold the paper to Stauffer Publications in 1951, which itself was acquired by Morris Communications in 1995. Morris sold the paper, along with 13 others, to GateHouse Media in 2007. The paper was again sold in 2021, this time to CherryRoad Media.

Audrey Stubbart, an American centenarian, worked for The Examiner until the age of 104.
