= Hattenville =

- Commune
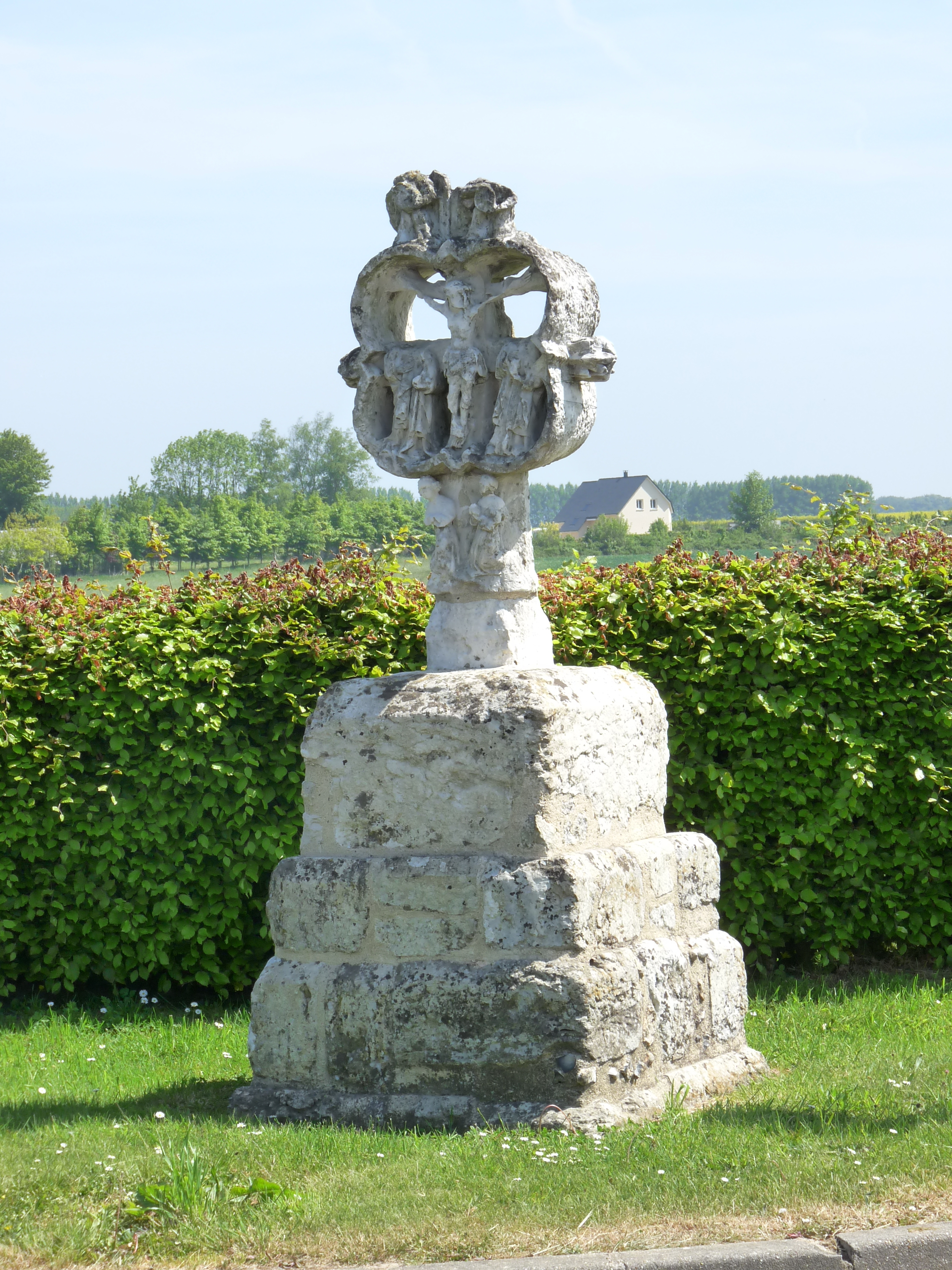
- The cross in Hattenville

- Coat of arms
- Location of Hattenville
- Location within France Location within Normandy
- Coordinates: 49°39′13″N 0°32′18″E
- Country: France
- Region: Normandy
- Department: Seine-Maritime
- Arrondissement: Le Havre
- Canton: Saint-Valery-en-Caux
- Intercommunality: Caux Seine Agglo

Government
  - Mayor (2020–2026): Jean-François Mayer
- Area^{1}: 9.32 km^{2} (3.60 sq mi)
- Elevation: 120 m (390 ft)
- Highest elevation: 139 m (456 ft)
- Lowest elevation: 113 m (371 ft)
- Population (2023): 704
  - Density: 75.5/km^{2} (196/sq mi)
- Time zone: UTC+01:00 (CET)
  - Summer (DST): UTC+02:00 (CEST)
- INSEE/Postal code: 76342 /76640
- ^{1} French Land Register data, which excludes lakes, ponds, glaciers > 1 km^{2} (0.386 sq mi or 247 acres) and river estuaries.

Hattenville (French pronunciation: [atɑ̃vil]) is a commune in the Seine-Maritime department in the Normandy region in northern France.

The most famous reference to Hattenville is in Paul Cézanne's painting 'Farm in Normandy, Summer'. This was painted at the farm of one of Cézanne's friends, very near Hattenville.

== Geography ==
A farming village situated in the Pays de Caux, some 22 miles (35 km) northeast of Le Havre, at the junction of the D28 and D217 roads.

== Heraldry ==
Arms of Hattenville	The arms of Hattenville are blazoned : Per chevron argent and gules, a balance sable and a trowel bendwise argent, and on a chief azure a lion between 2 pierced mullets Or.

== Population ==
Historical population
Year	Pop.	±% p.a.
1968	409	—
1975	325	−3.23%
1982	419	+3.70%
1990	468	+1.39%
1999	552	+1.85%
2007	652	+2.10%
2012	690	+1.14%
2017	724	+0.97%
2023	704	−0.47%
Source: INSEE

== Places of interest ==
- The church of St-Pierre, dating from the eleventh century.
- A fourteenth-century stone cross.

== See also ==
- Communes of the Seine-Maritime department
