= Joseph Marie Armer =

American Roman Catholic nun and botanist (1907–2000)

Sister Joseph Marie Armer C. C. V. I.

Personal life
- Born: Annie Augusta Armer; May 24, 1907
- Died: November 6, 2000 (aged 93) San Antonio, Texas
- Occupation: Botanist

Religious life
- Religion: Catholic

Joseph Marie Armer (1907–2000) was an American Roman Catholic sister and botanist. In 1956 she established the Alamo Regional Academy of Science and Engineering, also known as the Alamo Regional Science Fair. She was the Piper Professor of Texas for Teaching Excellence in 1964. A natural science chair at the University of the Incarnate Word is named for her.

== Youth and entry into religious life ==
She was born Annie Augusta Armer in 1907 to Augusta Eulalia Barnitz Armer and Leon Armer. She graduated from the University of Texas at Austin with a PhD in biology in 1929. UT Austin was one of the few universities in the United States to admit women at that time, and it did so from its inception in 1883. Although raised Baptist, she converted to Roman Catholicism in 1929 after she began working at the University of the Incarnate Word, and she joined the Sisters of Charity of the Incarnate Word. In 1943 she won a full tuition grant to the Catholic University of America for further studies. Her vision deteriorated throughout her adult life until she was considered legally blind, but she continued her teaching and research.
