= Mammadali Abbasov =

Azerbaijani Soviet bureaucrat (1907–2000)

- Məmmədəli Abbasov

Minister of Industrial Construction of the Azerbaijan SSR
- In office 196?–1969
- Preceded by: Position established
- Succeeded by: Gurban Sultanov

Minister of Construction of the Azerbaijan SSR
- In office 16 January 1962 – 196?
- Preceded by: Yagub Ismayilov
- Succeeded by: Position abolished

Personal details
- Born: 7 January 1907 Vladikavkaz, Terek Oblast, Caucasus Viceroyalty
- Died: 22 November 2000 (aged 93) Baku, Azerbaijan
- Party: All-Union Communist (Bolshevik) Party
- Education: Leningrad Institute of Railway Engineers
- Awards: Order of the Red Banner of Labour Order of the Badge of Honour

Mammadali Mammad oghlu Abbasov (Azerbaijani: Məmmədəli Məmməd oğlu Abbasov, 7 January 1907 — 22 November 2000) was an Azerbaijani Soviet bureaucrat who was Minister of Construction and Minister of Industrial Construction of the Azerbaijan SSR.

== Biography ==
Mammadali Abbasov was born on 7 January 1907, in the city of Vladikavkaz. He is originally from Nakhchivan. From 1924 to 1929 he studied at the railway construction faculty of the Leningrad Institute of Railway Engineers.

In 1930–1931 he was the chief field engineer of the Azerbaijan Main Water Facilities Construction Department in Baku and Kirovabad. In 1932–1934 he served in the Soviet Army, in 1935–1945 he worked as an engineer in various construction organizations of Baku. He worked here as a road engineer, local road inspector, field chief, and then deputy chief engineer of the Baku Construction Trust.

In 1937, when the construction of Sumgayit TPS, the largest thermal power station in Azerbaijan at that time, began, Abbasov was appointed chief engineer of construction. During World War II, he held a number of responsible positions in the system of the Azerneft oil refinery. From 1946 to 1950 he was the head and chief of the Capital Construction Department at the USSR Ministry of Oil Industry. From 1951 he worked as Deputy Chief of the Azerbaijan Marine Oil Union, and from 1957 as Chief of the Capital Construction Department of the National Economic Council of the Azerbaijan SSR. From 1962 he was the Minister of Construction of the Azerbaijan SSR.

Abbasov was a candidate member of the Central Committee of the Communist Party of Azerbaijan in 1964–1966, a former member since 1966, and was elected a deputy to the Supreme Soviet of the Azerbaijan SSR (2nd, 5th-7th convocations). He was awarded the "Red Banner of Labor", "Badge of Honor" and medals.

Abbasov died on 22 November 2000, in Baku.
