= Goingback Chiltoskey =

Native American model maker and woodcarver (1907 – 2000)

- Born: James Goingback Chiltoskie; April 20, 1907; Piney Grove, North Carolina, U.S.
- Died: November 12, 2000 (aged 93)
- Citizenship: Eastern Band Cherokee, American
- Education: Haskell Institute; Oklahoma A&M; Purdue University; Art Institute of Chicago
- Occupations: Model maker; Teacher; Woodcarver
- Spouse: Mary Ellen Ulmer
- Awards: NC State Art Society (1953)

Goingback Chiltoskey (April 20, 1907 – November 12, 2000), also written Goingback Chiltoskie, was an Eastern Band Cherokee woodcarver and model maker, "one of the most celebrated Cherokee woodcarvers of the Craft Revival era."

== Early life ==
James Goingback Chiltoskie was born in the Piney Grove community of the Qualla Boundary in 1907, the son of Will and Charlotte Hornbuckle Chiltoskie. (Chiltoskie was their preferred Anglicization of the Cherokee name Tsiladoosgi; Goingback changed his surname to the Chiltoskey spelling in the 1950s). He was a member of the Eastern Band of Cherokee Indians. After a difficult boarding school experience, Chiltoskey attended school in Greenville, South Carolina, and studied carpentry at the Haskell Institute in Lawrence, Kansas in 1929. He also studied jewelry making at the Santa Fe Indian School in the 1930s.

== Career ==
Chiltoskey taught woodworking at Cherokee High School from 1935 to 1940. During World War II he created wooden models at Fort Belvoir, Virginia for the United States Army Engineer Research and Development Laboratory, and after the war he taught woodworking to veterans. He also made models for motion pictures and for architects.

Chiltoskey was a member of the Southern Highland Craft Guild from 1948. He was a founder of the Qualla Arts and Crafts Matual cooperative. He was also a blowgun champion. He taught his niece Amanda Crowe some of his woodcarving techniques, and she became a sculptor too.

== Personal life ==
Goingback Chiltoskey married Mary Ellen Ulmer, a white woman and fellow teacher at the Cherokee School, in 1956. Mary Ulmer Chiltoskey spoke Cherokee, taught Cherokee language classes, and wrote several books on Cherokee culture with her husband. Goingback Chiltoskey spoke Cherokee, though he could not read or write in it. He and his brother Watty Chiltoskie, who could read, write, and speak the language, provided assistance to Mary Ulmer Chiltoskey for her 1972 book Cherokee Words with Pictures.

Goingback Chiltoskey died in 2000, aged 93 years, exactly a month after Mary died.

Field recordings, interviews, and other documentation of Goingback Chiltoskey and Mary Ulmer Chiltoskey are located in the Southern Highland Handicraft Guild Collection and the Ron Robinson Collection in the Southern Folklife Collection at the University of North Carolina at Chapel Hill. Works by Chiltoskey are in the North Carolina Museum of Art and the National Museum of the American Indian.
