= K. D. K. Dharmawardena =

Sri Lankan lyricist and broadcaster (1944–2000)

- Born: 13 June 1944; Kandy, Ceylon
- Died: 6 November 2000 (aged 56); Dubai
- Education: Dharmaraja College, Kandy
- Occupations: radio broadcaster, lyricist
- Spouse: Samadara Kottage

K. D. K. Dharmawardena was a lyricist and broadcaster in Sri Lanka. He was born on 13 June 1944 and died on 6 November 2000. He was married to Samadara Kottage. The songs, "Kumariyaka Paa Salamba" by W. D. Amaradeva, "Kohe Sita Oba Peminiyado" by Victor Rathnayake and "Handana Pana Nala" by Sunil Edirisinghe are some of Dharmawardena's notable lyrical contributions.
