= Robert E. Kneece =

American politician

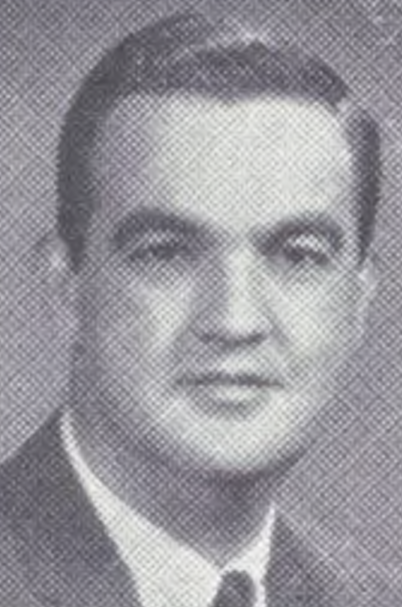
- Kneece in 1970

Member of the South Carolina House of Representatives from Richland County
- In office 1967–1975

Member of the South Carolina House of Representatives from the 78th district
- In office 1975–1976
- Preceded by: District established
- Succeeded by: Moffatt Burriss

Chairman of the South Carolina Department of Social Services
- In office 1978–1981
- Governor: James B. Edwards; Richard Riley

Personal details
- Born: Robert Edward Kneece; December 20, 1933 Columbia, South Carolina, U.S.
- Died: November 23, 2000 (aged 66) Dania Beach, Florida, U.S.
- Party: Democratic
- Education: University of South Carolina (LLB)

Robert Edward Kneece (December 20, 1933 – November 23, 2000) was an American politician. A member of the Democratic Party, he served in the South Carolina House of Representatives from 1967 to 1976 and as chairman of the South Carolina Department of Social Services from 1978 to 1981.

== Life and career ==
Kneece was born in Columbia, South Carolina, the son of Otis and Elise Kneece. He attended and graduated from Eau Claire High School. After graduating, he attended the University of South Carolina, earning his LLB degree in 1958, which after earning his degree, he worked as a lawyer.

Kneece served in the South Carolina House of Representatives from 1967 to 1976. After his service in the House, he served as chairman of the South Carolina Department of Social Services from 1978 to 1981.

Kneece was awarded the Order of the Palmetto by South Carolina governor Jim Hodges in 2000.

== Death ==
Kneece died on November 23, 2000, in Dania Beach, Florida, at the age of 66.
