= Max Archimowitz =

German politician

- Born: 26 February 1920; Free City of Danzig
- Died: 15 November 2000 (aged 80)
- Occupation: Politician
- Political party: Social Democratic Party of Germany

Max Archimowitz (26 February 1920 – 15 November 2000) was a German politician from the Social Democratic Party of Germany. He was a member of the Landtag of North Rhine-Westphalia from 1956 to 1958, from 1962 to 1966 and from 1969 to 1970.
