= Ramón Campbell =

Ramón Campbell Batista
- Born: March 9, 1911; Quilpué
- Died: November 13, 2000 (aged 89); Viña del Mar
- Occupations: Medical doctor, Ethnomusicologist, Composer

Ramón Campbell Batista (March 9, 1911, in Quilpué – November 13, 2000, in Viña del Mar) was a Chilean medical doctor, ethnomusicologist, and composer. He conducted important anthropological research on the traditional music of the Rapa Nui people.

== Life ==
After completing his university studies at the School of Medicine of the University of Chile in Santiago de Chile, he obtained the title of medical surgeon in 1939.

His musical studies began with private teacher Albina Lange (Theory and Piano), and he continued them irregularly until 1934 when he enrolled in evening courses at the Conservatory to expand his knowledge and, to some extent, systematize it. Within the Conservatory, he perfected his piano studies with Professor Judith Aldunate and his studies in Harmony and Composition with Pedro Humberto Allende.

One of the highlights of his research was the work he carried out for over a decade on Easter Island, where he served as a doctor to Jacques Cousteau's son when he had an accident. This led to a lasting friendship with the marine researcher. On the island, Campbell conducted research on the music and culture of Easter Island, publishing several books on the subject. One of them, "Herencia musical de Rapa Nui" (Musical Heritage of Rapa Nui), is studied in universities in the United States and Germany. In addition to his work as an ethnomusicologist, he composed the piece "Sinfonía Hotu Matúa," which was premiered by the Chilean National Symphony Orchestra in 1965. He was also nominated for the National Music Prize.

== Works ==
=== Compositions ===
For orchestra: Sinfonic Nocturne (1948). For chamber ensembles: Romantic Sonata for violin and piano (1947). Trio for violin, cello, and piano (1948). Classical Suite for cello and piano (1949). For piano: Four Stories (1937). Album Leaves (1941). "El Mar" (The Sea), suite (1948). For voice and piano: Twenty Chilean Songs (1936). "Lieder meine Geliebte" (Songs to My Beloved) for soprano, baritone, and piano (1937). Rounds and Children's Songs (1940).

=== Books ===
- La Herencia Musical de Rapa Nui. Etnomusicología de Isla de Pascua (The Musical Heritage of Rapa Nui. Ethnomusicology of Easter Island). Editorial Andrés Bello, 1971.
- La cultura de la Isla de Pascua: mito y realidad (The Culture of Easter Island: Myth and Reality). Editorial Andrés Bello, 1987.
