= Bill Burton (cricketer) =

New Zealand cricketer

Personal information
- Full name: Patrick William Burton
- Born: 15 May 1922; Whanganui, New Zealand
- Died: 8 November 2000 (aged 78); Lower Hutt, New Zealand

Domestic team information
- Years: Team
- 1940/41: Wellington
- Source: Cricinfo, 23 October 2020

Patrick William Burton (15 May 1922 – 8 November 2000) was a New Zealand cricketer. He played in one first-class match for Wellington during the 1940–41 season.

Burton was born at Whanganui in 1922 into a "well-known cricketing family". His only first-class match was a war time fixture between Wellington and Canterbury played at the Basin Reserve in February 1941. He scored a total of ten runs in his two innings and did not bowl.

During World War II Burton served in the Royal New Zealand Air Force. He trained in Canada and then served in the European theatre based in England. Initially serving as a flight sergeant, in 1944 he was promoted to the rank of pilot officer. He played a number of cricket matches in England for New Zealand services sides.

Burton died at Lower Hutt in 2000. He was aged 78.
