= John deBarbadillo =

American swim coach (1909–2000)

John J. deBarbadillo
- John deBarbadillo Sr. by York photographer Henry M. Blatner

Biographical details
- Born: March 21, 1909; Philadelphia County, U.S.
- Died: November 23, 2000 (aged 91); York, Pennsylvania, U.S.
- Education: York Collegiate Institute

Coaching career (HC unless noted)
- 1930–1974: York YMCA Swim Club
- 1974–1986: Outdoor Country Club; Athletic Director
- 1985–2000: YWCA Blue Dolphins SC

Accomplishments and honors

Awards
- 1969 Joseph G. Rogers Award (For teaching 1000's of YMCA youth); 1999 National YMCA Hall of Fame; 1973 York County Hall of Fame; 1988 John deBarbadillo Award (For YMCA Masters Swimming); Pennsylvania Sports Hall of Fame

John Joseph deBarbadillo Sr. (March 21, 1909 – November 23, 2000) was an American swim coach, best known for coaching Pennsylvania's York YMCA swim club from around 1929-March, 1974. He later coached the Outdoor Country Club from 1974-1986, and the YWCA Blue Dolphins from 1985-2000, though he was not officially a YMCA staff member at that time. During his career, he was credited with coaching 58 All American swimmers, and 1948 London Olympic Bronze 200-meter breaststroke medalist Bob Sohl.

Recognized by the International Swimming Hall of Fame, and the YMCA National Hall of Fame, deBarbadillo was noted for developing swimming programs for children, and for helping to build and evolve age group swimming for both youth and the YMCA-based Masters Swimming program. He was one of the developers of the breaststroke in the 1930's, and became instrumental in adding a forward over water arm recovery style that became known as the butterfly breaststroke. In 1953, when the butterfly was officially adopted as a separate stroke, the breaststroke would require a forward stroke recovery where the elbows remained in the water. deBarbadillos' YMCA youth swim programs are credited with training as many as 30,000 area children to learn basic swimming skills.

== Early life ==
deBarbadillo was born in the greater Philadelphia area on December 28, 1909 to Elsie Stouffer deBarbadillo and Francis X. deBarbadillo. He grew up around Brilhart Station in York County about 80 miles East of Philadelphia and taught himself to swim at York County's Codorus Creek's South Branch around the age of 10. He attended York High School, and later attended York Collegiate Institute, now known as York College of Pennsylvania. Although a competent swimmer, he competed primarily in gymnastics. By 1926, he was a member of the York YMCA Gymnastics program, and attended sessions at the YMCA training school at New York's Silver Bay. According to one source, York YMCA's swimming program had its origins around 1926, when deBarbadillo started training as a gymnist with the club. deBarbadillo passed the American National Life Saving Course during the mid-1920's while active in the Gymnasium courses at the York YMCA.

== Coaching ==
=== York YMCA coaching ===
deBarbadillo was announced as an Assistant York YMCA Physical Director in September, 1929, and by 1940, would serve as a full Physical Director of the York Y. He developed a relationship with Bob Hoffman, who started the York Barbell Club. From his association with weight training specialist Hoffman, deBarbadillo learned to apply strength training and nutrition as part of the preparation for both gymnastics, and eventually competitive swimming, where his teams would excel. By around 1935, the York YMCA Aquatic club had become a nationally recognized team. His YMCA teams produced a total of 58 All American swimmers, and he was the coach of 1948 Olympic bronze medalist in the 200-meter breaststroke, Bob Sohl. deBarbadillow also coached Bill Schmidt, a 1948 Olympic trial finalist in breaststroke. In the 1930's when the butterfly arm motion was first developed, deBarbadillo aided its growth and studied it to further its development. In his long career, he would help in the creation and growth of the YMCA's Masters Swimming Program, writing the Master's rules for competition, and directing the 1981 National Championship for YMCA Masters, the program's first national championship. One of York's swimmers, Dick Guyer, would coach the York Suburban Senior High School swim team beginning in 1967 and would remain as coach for over 30 years.

As a "Y" Coach, besides training competitive swimmers, deBarbadillo had a strong interest in teaching basic swimming skills. His early "learn to swim" program, initially provided as a free program, included students from many of the local York Elementary schools. Sometimes the York staff had a few thousand children in their learn to swim program over a course of around six weeks, but had a limited staff to instruct them. To deal with this challenge, deBarbadillo broke down the basic skills into several steps and assigned a coach to each step, rotating coaches as necessary over multiple days or weeks. This approach was referred to as the "station-to-station" approach, and was eventually adopted by many YMCAs in their teaching methods. By the mid-30's deBarbadillo also taught swimming and athletics at a YMCA summer camp known as Camp Mingua, usually held East of nearby Airville, Pennsylvania in the Susquehanna River, with their sessions lasting the month of July, or on occasion only a weekend. He would eventually serve as the Director of Camp Mingua.

=== Naval service ===
Entering the U.S. Navy during the WWII era in 1943, John worked in various positions, and later worked in the Pacific theatre where he taught swimming.

deBarbadillo married his first wife Dorothy Knaub at the Valley Forge Chapel on September 3, 1932. Dorothy was a 1926 graduate of York High School who predeceased him in 1972. He later married Betty Neal Reinecker deBarbadillo. His wife Betty enjoyed travelling with John, and helped officiate at many of the YMCA meets John coached and attended.

=== Coaching after York YMCA ===
After retiring from the YMCA in York, deBarbadillo coached the York Outdoor Country Club from 1974-1986, and the Blue Dolphins of York's Young Women's Christian Association (YWCA) swim team from around 1985-2000, when he retired

Staying active in the swimming community, John served as a referee and official for United States Swimming, American Athletic Union, and National Collegiate Association meets, as well as on state and regional committees for these and other swimming-related organizations. He served as a YMCA Physical Directors Society President for the state of Pennsylvania, and served two terms as an Aquatics Commissioner for the state as well. He chaired the pre-school committee for the YMCA at the National level. For serving as an official at National meets, he was a recipient of the Conrad Carroll Award.

=== Publications ===
deBarbadillo was the author for the publication, "Teaching the Very Young to Swim". When he was awarded the title of Director of Physical Education by the York YMCA, he completed the thesis, "A Station to Station Method of Teaching the Crawl Stroke", his "assembly line" method of teaching swimming to young swimmers in large groups with each skill taught at a separate station.

deBarbadillo died on the morning of November 23 at York Hospital in York, Pennsylvania. He was survived by his wife Betty Neal DeBarbadillo, and a son John who became a physician and swam for LeHigh University. deBarbadillo was also survived by a stepson, and two granddaughters. A service was held on November 28, 2000 at Church of St. John the Baptist on N. Beaver Street, and he was buried in Susquehanna Memorial Gardens in York County adjacent to his first wife Dorothy. He had been a member of York's St. John the Baptist, and the Veterans of Foreign Wars.

=== Honors ===
In his honor, the John deBaradillo Award was established by the National YMCA, to recognize a person who has dedicated themselves to building and improving YMCA Masters Swimming programs. deBaradillo was the first to receive the award in 1988. Other honors included a 1999 induction into the National YMCA Hall of Fame, whose members are displayed at Springfield College, as well as becoming an inductee to the Pennsylvania Sports Hall of Fame, and a 1973 York County Sports Hall of Fame inductee.

In 1968, he was elected by the YMCA as a "Fellow in Physical Education", and in 1969 North American YMCAs presented him with the Roberts-Gulick Award, the highest award given to YMCA Directors. In 1970, he received the Distinguished Service Award from the National YMCA Aquatic Committee. In 1973, he was the recipient of a Citation from President Richard M. Nixon for his contributions to physical fitness. In 1979, he was presented with the Joseph G. Rogers award from the U.S. National YMCA, for long service to YMCA youth. The names of the recipients of the Joseph Rogers award are displayed on a statue of Joseph Rogers at the International Swimming Hall of Fame in Fort Lauderdale. At a banquet in York in 1997, he was awarded a plaque from the International Swimming Hall of Fame for being one of the longest serving U.S. swim coaches.
