= Edward Bridge Danson Jr. =

American archaeologist and museum director (1916–2000)

Edward Bridge Danson Jr. (March 22, 1916 – November 30, 2000) was an American anthropologist, professor, and museum director. He is known for his archeological work in the American Southwest, and his contributions as the director of the Museum of North Arizona (MNA) from 1958 until his retirement in 1975. In addition to this, he was also a trustee of the Folklife Center at the Library of Congress, a chairman of the Colorado Plateau Environmental Advisory Council, and a member of the advisory board of the Southwestern Parks and Monuments Association. He was also the father of actor Ted Danson.

== Early life and education ==
Danson was born in Glendale, Ohio, in 1916 to his mother and father, Anna Louise Allen and Edward Bridge Danson respectively. He was the youngest of three siblings. Growing up, he attended Cincinnati Country Day School, the Asheville School in North Carolina, and Hughes High School in Cincinnati. During this time, automobiles were only just becoming more widespread in American society and he had taken a great interest in them. By the time he was in his adolescence, he had practically become an aficionado on them. This interest in cars would eventually lead to a drag racing incident in which he and his cousin had raced to school and caused three different cars to be forced off the road. Anna Louise Allen, his mother, was in one of these three cars and had decided to ground him following the incident. As a part of this punishment, she made arrangements to send him on the maiden voyage of a schooner named Yankee, crewed by other teenagers. The Yankee would circumnavigate the globe, allowing Danson to be exposed to a variety of different cultures, social skills, and lifelong friends.

Upon his return to the United States in 1935, Danson enrolled at Cornell University with many of his other friends from his hometown in Glendale. In 1937, he and two of his cousins would make a trip to visit his uncle, Bill Allen, to start a guest ranch near Tubac, Arizona. His time there had been formative, as he had fallen in love with the state. As a result, in 1939, he made the decision to transfer to the University of Arizona's Archaeological Field School at Forestdale to study archeology with Emil Haury, his mentor. In the Fall of 1938, Haury invited Danson to participate in the excavation of Painted Cave in northeastern Arizona. This was his first archaeological experience. Danson would receive his B.A. in archeology in 1940, and began his survey of the Santa Cruz Valley in southern Arizona in the summer of following year, and planned to use this experience for his master's thesis.

Preceding the United States' entry into World War II, Danson would take a break from education to become a commissioned naval communications officer in 1941. Before he was deployed, Danson married Jessica Harriet MacMaster on November 7, 1942. His time in the Pacific theater would bring him to New Caledonia, Guadalcanal, and Bougainville. Following his retirement from the Naval Reserve as lieutenant commander in 1945, he would attend Harvard University for his graduate studies.

== Career ==
After receiving his master's degree from Harvard University, Danson began teaching at the University of Colorado in 1948, then later moved to teach at the University of Arizona in 1950. While teaching there, he would eventually reconnect with Harold Sellers Colton, the founder of the Museum of Northern Arizona, whom he had met back in 1941. In the summer of 1951, Danson had written a dissertation while a resident of MNA, and after receiving his Ph.D. in 1952 from Harvard University, he eventually went on to serve on the MNA Board of Trustees by 1953. In 1956, Colton had invited Danson to become an assistant director of MNA and by 1958, Danson became the 2nd director of MNA once Colton had retired. He would hold this position until he retired in 1975. As director, Danson's accolades include maintaining the support the Colton family along with expanding MNA's funding/donor base, modernizing governance, adding to MNA's collections, expanding research, deepening the relationship between the museum and Native Americans, and cooperating with state and federal efforts to protect cultural resources.

== Death ==
On November 30, 2000, Edward Bridge Danson Jr. died at his home in Sedona, Arizona.
