= Ralph Bingham Cloward =

American neurosurgeon

- Born: September 24, 1908; Salt Lake City, Utah
- Died: November 13, 2000 (aged 92); Queen's Medical Center
- Education: University of Utah, University of Chicago
- Occupation: Neurosurgeon
- Known for: Innovative spinal surgery
- Spouse: Florence Bauer

Ralph Bingham Cloward (September 24, 1908 — November 13, 2000) was an American neurosurgeon, best known for his innovations in spinal neurosurgery. Cloward is known for the development of the Posterior Lumbar Interbody Fusion and Anterior Cervical Discectomy and Fusion. Cloward moved from Chicago to Hawaii in 1938, becoming the state's lone neurosurgeon. He is well known for his work treating victims of brain injuries after the Pearl Harbor attack in 1941.

== Early life and education ==
Ralph Cloward was born in Salt Lake City, Utah, in 1908. He schooled at McKinley High School, Honolulu before studying at the University of Utah. He completed his medical education at the Rush Medical School in Chicago. He interned at St Luke's Hospital, Chicago, and attended the University of Chicago under Professor Percival Bailey as a resident in 1938.

== Medical career ==
He began his practice of neurosurgery in the Territory of Hawaii in 1938. He was the only American neurosurgeon in the Pacific theater during World War II. In connection with the attack on Pearl Harbor in 1941, he performed 44 craniotomies in 4 days.

His academic accomplishments include visiting professorships at the University of Chicago, University of Oregon, University of Southern California, and Rush Medical School. He was Professor of Neurosurgery at the John A. Burns School of Medicine at the University of Hawaiʻi. He is the author of numerous papers and book chapters and has lectured and operated in many nations.

Cloward's pioneering contributions encompass many areas of neurosurgery, but his enduring interest was the spine, where he devised three major operations. He first performed the posterior lumbar interbody fusion successfully in 1943, reporting it in the Hawaiian Territorial Medical Association in 1945 and publishing it in the Journal of Neurosurgery in 1953. His unique approach for treating hyperhydrosis was reported in 1957. Independently, he conceived an anterior approach to the cervical spine, devised instruments for its implementation, and published his classic paper in the Journal of Neurosurgery on anterior cervical discectomy and fusion in 1958. He designed over 100 surgical instruments which continue to be used today by practicing neurosurgeons.

=== Posterior Lumbar Interbody Fusion (PLIF) ===
After William Mixter and Joseph Barr published their famed paper of disk herniation in 1934, discectomy to remove stenosis became the routine procedure. Alternative attempts were to fuse the posterior arch of the spine. In cases of spondylolisthesis, some surgeons had fused the interbody space, but only from an anterior approach. During a posterior discectomy operation in 1940, Cloward noticed a large hole in the remaining annulus fibrosis, and it occurred to him that this void could be filled with a piece of bone. But the patient suffered a pulmonary embolism on the tenth post-operative day, and died. This complication led Cloward to abandon his idea until 1943. Because disk herniation recurred in many cases, Cloward devised to reattempt his posterior interbody fusion procedure, which he did with success. Cloward soon became an expert of the procedure, and began to advocate for its use. In 1945, he presented the technique before the Hawaiian Territorial Medical Association, and at the annual meeting of the Harvey Cushing Society (now the American Association of Neurological Surgeons) in 1947. However, at the Harvey Cushing Society meeting, reception to the technique was critical. At the time, neurosurgeons were apprehensive about fusion techniques, which were traditionally an orthopedic method. Moreover, the procedure was very challenging, and was associated with complications. However, as Cloward and later advocates argued, if performed successfully, the PLIF provided better biomechanics and outcomes.

Over time, after refining the technique and advocating its merits with publications and lectures, the PLIF became respected. With the help of a few other surgeons, including Paul Lin, the first PLIF Workshop was held at Nazareth Hospital in Philadelphia in 1981 and the first PLIF Symposium was held in Temple Hospital in 1983. By this time, the procedure had garnered many advocates. In later years, when pedicle screw and interbody cage instrumentation became widespread, the PLIF became the most popular method of lumbar fusion.

When Cloward published his last paper on PLIF in 1985, he reported a successful fusion rate of over 92%. Cloward was the first to perform PLIF, both unsuccessfully and successfully and the first to publish a large patient series.

=== Anterior Cervical Discectomy and Fusion (ACDF) ===
Other than the PLIF, Cloward is well known as being an innovator in the anterior approach to cervical fusion. In the mid 1950s, techniques for anterior approach to cervical fusions were developed by four groups simultaneously; Carl Badgley, Leroy Abbott and Robert Bailey at the University of Michigan, by Robert Robinson and George Smith at Johns Hopkins University, by Albert Dereymaeker and Joseph Mulier in France and by Cloward in Honolulu. None were aware of the work of the others at the time.

Bailey, Badgely and Abbott had been the first to use the technique however, the first report was provided by Robinson and Smith, in 1955. Cloward's technique differed from the other surgeon's in that he used a large dowel graft, as opposed to the strut graft that the others used. His idea for this dowel was taken from a modification made by Ben Wiltberger to Cloward's PLIF operation, who had used dowels in place of Cloward's bone pegs. Cloward published his work on the subject in 1958.

Though not the first to perform or publish the procedure, his standing in the neurosurgical field at the time enhanced its early popularity. Like the PLIF, ACDF is now a popular method of spinal fusion.

=== Later career ===
Throughout his career, he educated the international community of neurosurgeons in the performance of the operations he devised.

Cloward was a member of the Western Neurosurgical Society for 40 years and served as its president in 1975. After his death in 2000, a number of Society members were desirous of creating an award in his name which would include a medal akin to the Cushing Medallion awarded by the AANS. It was felt that Ralph's innovative talents and pioneering efforts to establish anterior cervical and posterior lumbar interbody fusion plus the numerous instruments he devised was just cause to honor him in perpetuity by bestowing an award upon neurosurgeons from around the world who also exemplified such capacity for epochal innovation and pioneering application. In 2002, the Society established the award with the gracious assistance of the surviving Cloward family.
