= Fake news in the United States =

False information (known as "fake news") in the United States has been a subject of discussion and debate, especially since the increased reliance on the Internet and social media for information.

== Terminology ==
According to the website of the Cambridge English Dictionary, the term fake news "is that something is believable no matter what¨ which is seen as damaging to an agency, entity, or person. However, is by no means restricted to politics, and seems to have currency in terms of general news." False news has been defined as "political speech."

Editorial from The Daily Democrat of Hamilton, Ohio, January 27, 1893, defining fake news

== Information Age ==
=== COVID-19 Pandemic ===
During the global shutdown and especially during the burgeoning stages of the pandemic, inaccurate or misleading information was often spread about the nature of the virus, its origins, and ways to treat or prevent it. Content on social media sites, television, and the news drove the number of English-language fact-checks up more than 900% from January to March of 2020.

=== Disney lowers drinking age to 18 ===
In 2022 a TikTok account by the name of Mouse Trap News posted a video saying that Disney is trying to lower the drinking age to 18 in their Walt Disney World park in Florida. This story looks believable and they even have a link to an article to support this. But at a deeper look into the article shows no supporting evidence to this news. But what really gives away that it's fake is the bio of the Mouse Trap News account saying "Real Disney News That is 100% FAKE". So it turns out that the video was made just to cause a reaction and trick the Disney fans.

=== 2016 presidential election ===
In the run-up to the 2016 presidential election, fake news was particularly prevalent and spread rapidly over social media by "bots", according to researchers at the Oxford Internet Institute. In a speech shortly after the election, former Democratic candidate Hillary Clinton warned of the "real-world consequences" of fake news. Google Trends shows that the term "fake news" gained traction in online searches in October 2016.

Debate over the impact of fake news in the November 2016 United States presidential election, and whether or not it significantly impacted the election of the Republican candidate Donald Trump, whom the most shared fake stories favored, led researchers from Stanford to study the impact of fake news shared on social media, where 62% of U.S. adults get their news from. They assessed that 8% of readers of fake news recalled and believed in the content they were reading, though the same share of readers also recalled and believed in "placebos" — stories they did not actually read, but that were produced by the authors of the study. In comparison, over 50% of the participants recalled reading and believed in true news stories. The authors do not assess the final impact of these numbers on the election, but seek to "offer theoretical and empirical background" for the debate.

Republican candidate Donald Trump tweeted or retweeted posts about "fake news" or "fake media" 176 times as of December 20, 2017, according to an online archive of all of Trump's tweets. Governmental bodies in the U.S. and Europe started looking at contingencies and regulations to combat fake news specially when as part of a coordinated intelligence campaign by hostile foreign governments. Online tech giants Facebook and Google started putting in place means to combat fake news in 2016 as a result of the phenomenon becoming globally known.

Fraudulent stories during the 2016 U.S. presidential election included a viral post popularized on Facebook that Pope Francis had endorsed Trump, and another that actor Denzel Washington "backs Trump in the most epic way possible". Trump's son and campaign surrogate Eric Trump, top national security adviser Michael Flynn, and then-campaign managers Kellyanne Conway and Corey Lewandowski shared fake news stories during the campaign.

In December 2016, an armed North Carolina man, Edgar Maddison Welch, traveled to Washington, D.C., and opened fire at the Comet Ping Pong pizzeria, driven by a fake online news story known as the Pizzagate conspiracy theory, which accused the pizzeria of hosting a pedophile ring run by Democratic Party leaders. These stories tended to go viral quickly. Social media systems, such as Facebook, played a large role in the broadcasting of fake news. These systems showed users content that reflected their interests and history, leading to fake and misleading news. Following a plea agreement with prosecutors, Welch pleaded guilty to the federal charge of interstate transport of firearms and a District of Columbia charge of assault with a dangerous weapon. Welch was sentenced to four years in prison on June 22, 2017 and agreed to pay $5,744.33 for damages to the restaurant.

=== Presidency of Donald Trump ===
Google Trends topic searches began a substantial increase in late 2016, about the time of the U.S. presidential election.

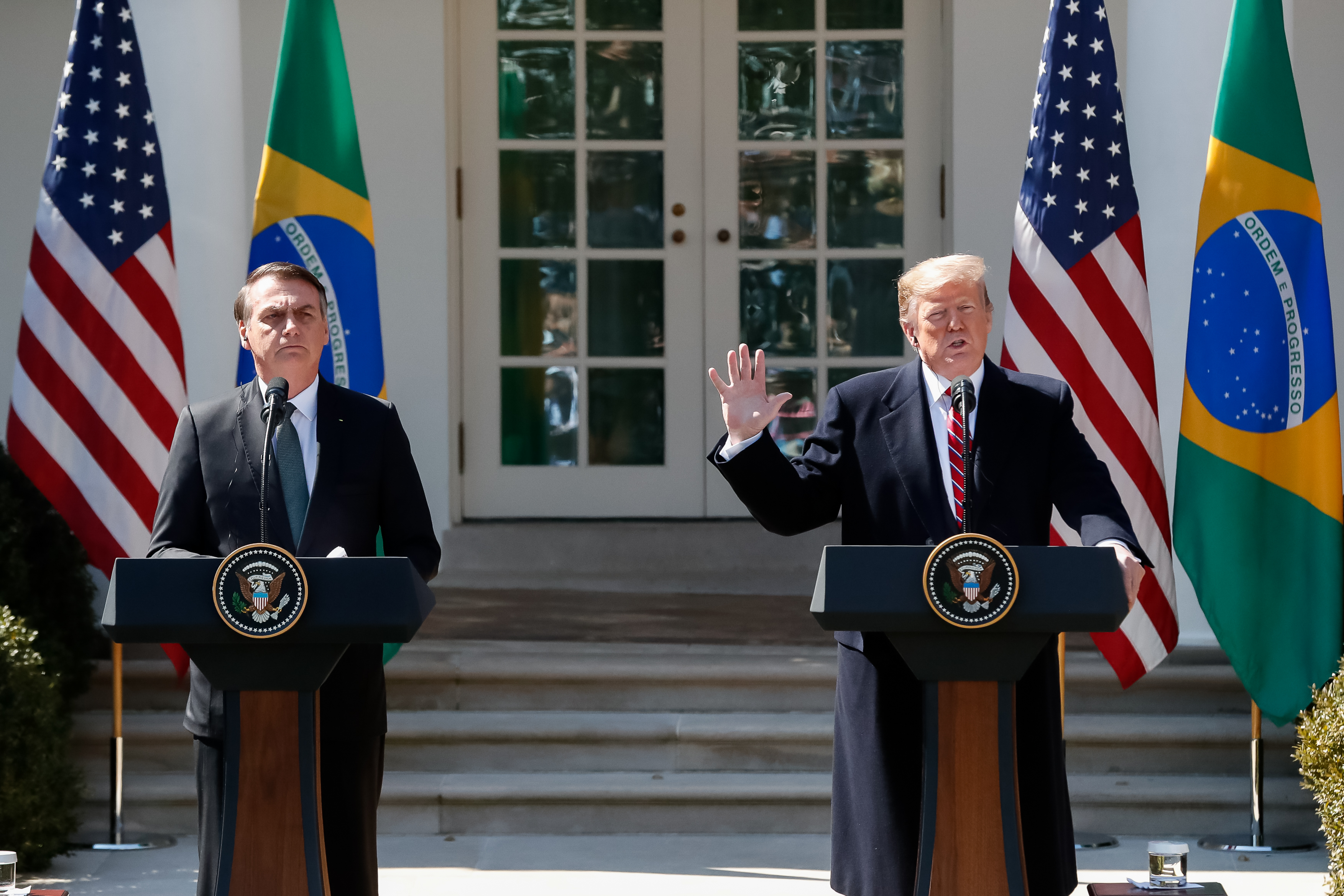
During a joint news conference, President Trump said he was "very proud" to hear Brazilian president Jair Bolsonaro use the term "fake news".

In the early weeks of his presidency, Donald Trump frequently used the term "fake news" to refer to traditional news media, singling out CNN. Linguist George Lakoff says this creates confusion about the phrase's meaning. According to CBS 60 Minutes, President Trump might have used the term fake news to describe any news, however legitimate or responsible, with which he might have disagreed.

After Republican Colorado state senator Ray Scott used the term in 2017 as a reference to a column in the Grand Junction Daily Sentinel, the newspaper's publisher threatened a defamation lawsuit.

Starting in July 2017, Trump's 2020 presidential campaign launched Real News Update, an online news program posted on Facebook. The series reports on Trump's accomplishments as president of the United States and claims to highlight "real news" as opposed to alleged "fake news". Lara Trump introduced one video by saying "If you are tired of all the fake news out there...we are going to bring you nothing but the facts" and "I bet you haven't heard about all the accomplishments the president had this week, because there's so much fake news out there". The show was labeled as "propaganda".

In January 2018, it was reported that a Gallup-Knight Foundation survey found that 17% of Democrats and 42% of Republicans "consider accurate news stories that cast a politician or political group in a negative light to always be 'fake news.'" A June 2018 poll by Axios and Survey Monkey found that 72% of Americans believe "traditional news outlets knowingly report false or misleading stories at least sometimes," with 92% of Republican and Republican-leaning independents and 53% of Democrats believing this.

An investigation by The Michigan Daily in October 2019 into statewide networks of conservative-leaning, pseudo local news sites, published by Locality Labs and the Metric Media Foundation, revealed connections between the operation and Dan Proft, the Liberty Principles PAC, and the Nexstar Media Group. Metric Media was reportedly planning on creating more sites across the nation in what critics dubbed a disinformation campaign that might have been attempting to influence the 2020 elections.

=== Republicans in Congress ===
As well as Trump, Republican members of the U.S. House of Representatives have started using the fake news label to delegitimize established news media since 2016. According to a 2020 study, use of the fake news label strongly aligns with representatives' voting records in Congress, with more conservative members more likely to adopt the label.

== Colonial America ==
=== 1762 Virginia law ===
In 1762, the Grand Assembly of Virginia enacted the following law to punish "divulgers of false news."

Be it enacted, That what person or persons soever shall forge and divulge such false reports, tending to the trouble of the country, shall be, by next Justice of the Peace, sent for, and bound over to the next County Court, where, if he produce not the author, he shall be fined two thousand pounds of tobacco, (or less) if the Court thinks fit to lessen it [sic], and besides, give bond for his behavior, if it appears to the Court that he did maliciously publish and invent it.

== Pre-Civil War ==
=== 1809: Insurrections likely ===
On December 6, 1809, U.S. Representative George W. Campbell of Tennessee, in a speech on the House floor, said that:

Your publick [sic] prints teemed with falsehoods, and misstatements on this subject; insurrections were announced in some quarters of the union as likely to take place, and dreadful stress stated to prevail every where. These groundless misrepresentations, circulated for party purposes alone, went abroad, and had, no doubt, considerable influence on the conduct of foreign nations.

=== 1830: Electioneering ===
The Argus of Western America, Frankfort, Kentucky, related on November 10, 1830, that:

The practice of giving false news for electioneering purposes, in this country, originated with the "National" Intelligencer. Its servile co-workers abroad, of the [Henry] Clay school of politics, have adopted it, and the confident tone in which they now utter falsehoods, proves that the opposition rest their hopes of success upon the gullibility of their readers. . . . Those Siamese twins, the "National" Journal and "National" Intelligencer, of this city [Washington], are constantly in the habit of playing into each others hands by giving false news to their readers. [All italics are in the original.]

=== 1840: Van Buren 'victory' ===
After the 1840 election, the New York Commercial Advertiser opined that

The Van Buren leaders of this city have much to answer for, in regard to the false news of success which they dispatched to the South on Friday. In Washington the office-holders were thrown into a delirium of joy, and fell into the most extravagant antics. Mr. Van Buren himself was heard to declare that he was now "Certain of success, for I now know," he added, That "New York is mine!" [Italics are in the original.] He awoke from his reverie, probably, at half past 11 o'clock yesterday morning."

=== 1848: Cuba negotiations ===
In December 1848, the Heraldo newspaper of Madrid, Spain, denied a report in the New York Herald that the United States was in negotiations with Spain to purchase the island of Cuba. The Heraldo chastised "Anglo-American" newspapers as being "famous, throughout the world, for the false news and dates which they delight to propagate, adorned with a thousand details, intended to give them an appearance of truth."

== Civil War through Gilded Age ==
=== 1861: Telegraphers ===
An 1861 editorial in the Memphis Daily Avalanche of Tennessee recommended legislating "a penal offense to send false news over the telegraph line." The editorial noted, however, that it would be "unjust to reproach the telegraph company or agents, for the telegraph is a simple agent for the conveyance of news, and is no more responsible for what is sent over the wires than a horse which conveys false news in the mails. . . . The telegraphers are much annoyed when they are forced by their position to send or receive false news, known by them to be false."

=== 1863: Stock speculations on reported victory ===
Under a headline reading "Government Connivance at the Transmission of False News Reports," the Burlington (Vermont) Sentinel complained on May 22, 1863, that "disgraceful falsehoods" had been "telegraphed throughout the country regarding the state of affairs in the army and its movements" and that the reason for them "is pretty correctly hinted at by the N.Y. Evening Post, which claimed that cabinet stock speculations were at the bottom of this false information."

The Independent of New York City stated:

It is difficult to dismiss the suspicion that some pretty high parties have been attempted to operate in the gold market. [Italics in the original.] Correspondents here endeavored in vain yesterday to telegraph to their friends that there was not a word of truth in the wild stoies . . . but the government censor would not permit the denial! This is certainly very strange. [Italics in the original.]

The Springfield Republican was quoted as saying: "While the most ridiculous stories about the capture of Richmond were flying through the northern towns, no newspaper correspondent here was allowed the privilege of denying the false rumors." [Italics in the original].

=== 1879: Jay Gould accused ===
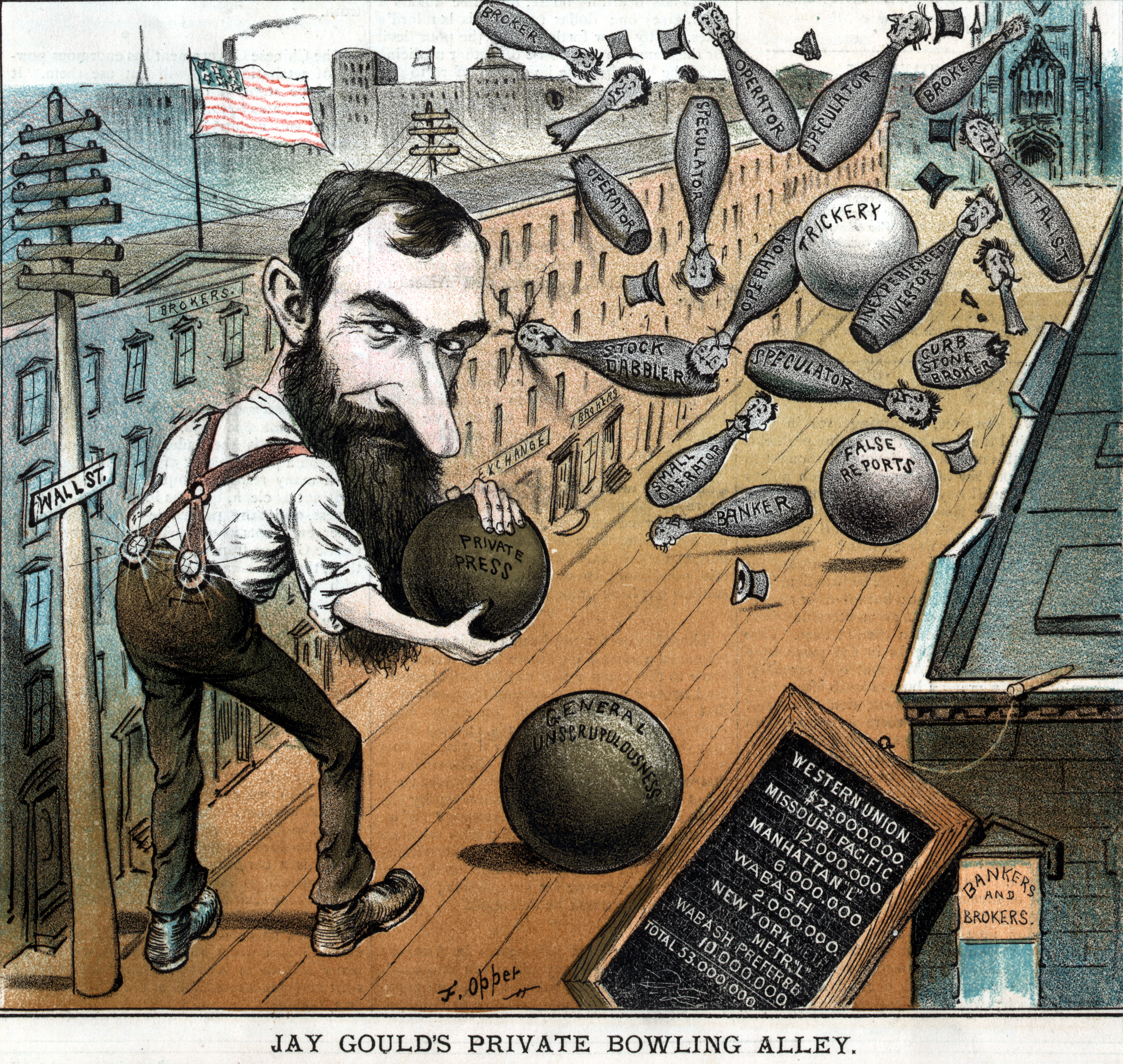
Cartoon from Puck, 1882, depicting Wall Street as "Jay Gould's Private Bowling Alley"

The New York Tribune was charged by The (Philadelphia) Times on November 26, 1879, with printing and editorially endorsing "false news" that brought about "the financial crisis of last week, which took several millions of dollars out of the pockets of men of moderate means to place this vast sum in the strong boxes of Mr. [Jay] Gould and his fellow conspirators on Wall Street." (Financier Gould was principal owner of the Tribune.) According to the Philadelphia Times, the New York Evening Post, however, did "the cause of honest journalism a good service in unearthing a statute which seems to fit the case of . . . Gould exactly." The law forbade anybody from circulating "false intelligence, with the intent of depreciating or advancing the market price" of stocks, bonds, merchandise or commodity. The penalty was set at a fine of "not exceeding five thousand dollars and imprisonment for a period not exceeding three years, or either."

The Philadelphia Times continued:

It would be well for . . . Gould to paste this law in his hat. His enormous profits on his last speculation, through the dissemination of false news, would enable him to pay the fine without pain to his pocket, but the imprisonment would give him some discomfort and the country some satisfaction.

=== 1884: Presidential election results ===
Five years later, the New York Tribune was accused by The Journal of Commerce with "willful and deliberate forgery" in printing "false news" concerning New York State's results in the 1884 Presidential election. The New-York Times urged that the State legislature should "so amend the law as to bring within its provisions the most mischievous and flagitious of all the varieties of the offense of willfully publishing false news."

== Progressive Era ==
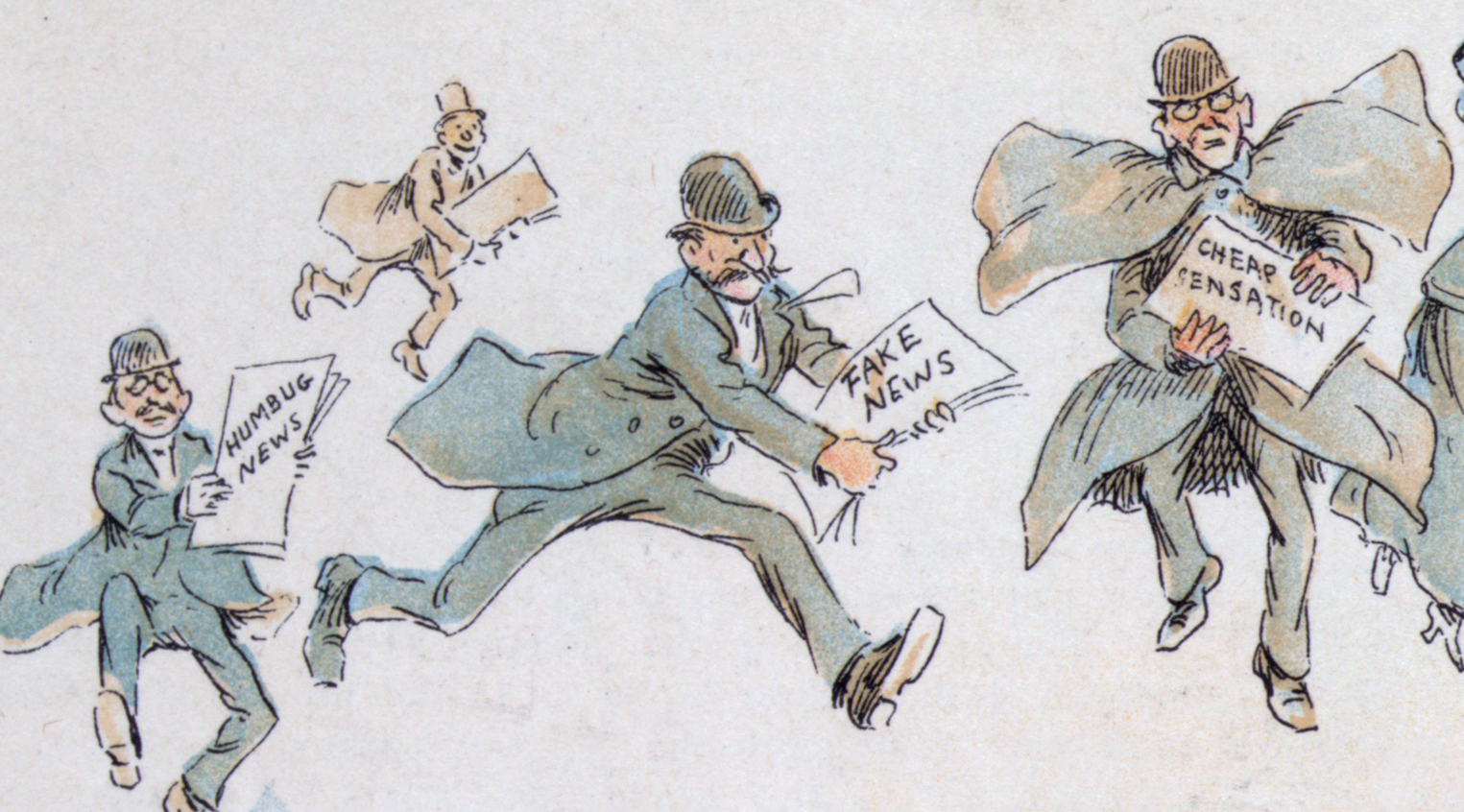
Reporters with various forms of "fake news" from an 1894 illustration by Frederick Burr Opper

=== 1890s ===
False news was recognized as a problem in the United States in the 1890s. One editorialist wrote in 1896 that:

The American newspapers are fairly beating their own record at the present time in their success in getting up sensations and setting afloat fake news. . . . our people are in a frame of mind which accepts without question the most absurd statements the mind of man can conceive, and even try to invent excuses for their credulity.

=== 1900: Theodore Durrant innocence ===
An "alleged confession" by the pastor of San Francisco's Immanuel Baptist Church that it was he who had murdered Blanche Lamont and Minnie Williams in a well-publicized 1895 murder case was "going the rounds" in a "fake report." Theodore Durrant was hanged for the crimes in 1898. The San Francisco Examiner, responding to a query, denied the report and called it a "false rumor."

The Auburn (Nebraska) Granger editorialized that the fake "adds further proof, if further proof be needed, that newspaper reports are unreliable and not to be depended upon." The Coffeyville (Kansas) Gaslight said: "The story was very cleverly concocted stating that the minister, on his deathbed, had made a full confession of the crime and that Durrant, who was convicted on purely circumstantial evidence, had been fully vindicated. It now turns out that the story is a fake from beginning to end."

=== 1900: Philippine Insurrection ===
During the Philippine Insurrection, it was reported that:

Hong Kong is the headquarters of fake news from the Philippines just as Shanghai is the source of most of the fake news about Pekin and Chinese massacres. There is a vicious and industrious Filipino junta at Hong Kong with a malicious Englishman at the head of it which manufactures the sensational news regarding American atrocities in Luzon and sends them out for the benefit of anti-expansionists and Democratic organs in this country [the United States].

=== 1902: Treasury Secretary Shaw ===
A headline writer for the Washington (D.C.) Times, labeled a story about Secretary of the Treasury L.M. Shaw a "Good Example of Fake News" over a July 9, 1902, article reporting that Shaw had "specifically stated . . . on several occasions" his belief that all officers of the Treasury should be limited in their terms of office to "four or five years." Two weeks later, a press release from Shaw said that inquiries "from all over the country" impelled him to deny the story, which he termed "made out of whole cloth." The Evening Times-Republican of Marshalltown, Iowa, chided that "These hot-weather tales are liable to float out most any time. The public would do well to accept sensational stories conditionally, awaiting confirmation."

== Mid-20th century ==
=== 1919: The law ===
The placement of false news stories, or the attempt, often as a joke, was so pervasive that The Evening Sun of Hanover, Pennsylvania, warned against the practice by noting that the Pennsylvania law provided for a $500 fine and a two-year jail term in case of conviction.

=== 1936: Lindbergh ransom ===
The New York Daily News published an editorial apologizing for an article from "a New England correspondent" that appeared in the newspaper on April 25, 1936, stating that "$20,000 in Lindbergh ransom bills had recently turned up in Albany and various Massachusetts towns." The editorial said:

We are convinced now that the story was a fake, though the New England correspondent still thinks there may be something in it. We are sorry to have published the story. We think any newspaper that does fake news is foolish. It is so easy to expose a fake news story, and as soon as the public finds out about it the newspaper that published the fake loses some reader confidence. Repeat the process often enough, and the paper loses the confidence of all the readers except the natural born and incurable suckers.

=== Analysis ===
Professor Philip N. Howard of the Oxford Internet Institute at the University of Oxford studied web traffic in the United States prior to the election. He found that about one half of all news on Twitter directed at Michigan was junk or fake, and the other half came from actual professional news sources. According to BuzzFeed, during the last three months of the presidential campaign, of the top twenty fake election-related articles on Facebook, seventeen were anti-Clinton or pro-Trump. Facebook users interacted with them more often than with stories from genuine news outlets.

In 2019 Christine Michel Carter, a writer who has reported on Generation Alpha for Forbes stated that one-third of the generation can decipher false or misleading information in the media.

A CNN investigation examined exactly how fake news can start to trend. There are "bots" used by fake news publishers that make their articles appear more popular than they are. This makes it more likely for people to discover them. "Bots are fake social media accounts that are programmed to automatically 'like' or retweet a particular message."

Hunt Allcott and Matthew Gentzkow estimated that the average US adult read and remembered between one and several fake news articles during the 2016 US presidential election period. Equating the impact of one such article to a television campaign ad, they suggested that the fake news articles they had studied would have only changed vote shares by hundredths of a percentage point, much smaller than Trump's margin in pivotal states.

A situation study by The New York Times in 2017 showed how a tweet by a person with no more than 40 followers went viral and was shared 16,000 times on Twitter. The tweet concluded that protesters were paid to be bussed to Trump demonstrations and protest. A Twitter user then posted a photograph of two buses outside a building, claiming that those were the anti-Trump protesters. The tweet immediately went viral on both Twitter and Facebook. Fake news can easily spread due to the speed and accessibility of modern communications technology.

In January 2024, the World Economic Forum highlighted disinformation as a top global threat over the next few years, citing concerns around AI and the disruption of elections, including in the United States.

== See also ==
- False advertising
- Fake news websites in the United States
- Fake news in India
- Fake news in the Philippines
- Indian WhatsApp lynchings
