= Newspaper endorsements in the 2016 United States presidential election =

Various newspapers endorsed candidates in the 2016 United States presidential election, as follows. Tables below also show which candidate each publication endorsed in the 2012 United States presidential election (where known) and include only endorsements for the general election. Primary endorsements are separately listed - see Newspaper endorsements in the United States presidential primaries, 2016.

Among the United States' 100 largest newspapers by paid circulation, 57 endorsed Democratic candidate Hillary Clinton, while only two, the Las Vegas Review-Journal and the Florida Times-Union, endorsed Republican presidential nominee Donald Trump. Four (the Chicago Tribune, the Detroit News, the Richmond Times-Dispatch, and the Charleston (South Carolina) Post and Courier) endorsed Libertarian candidate Gary Johnson, while three other newspapers (USA Today, the Fort Worth Star-Telegram, and the Milwaukee Journal-Sentinel) specifically discouraged their readers from voting for Trump. Clinton won support from not only traditionally Democratic-leaning newspapers, but also traditionally non-political and conservative newspapers, including those that had "...either never before supported a Democrat or had not in many decades ... or had never endorsed any presidential candidate, like USA Today."

Trump received endorsements from only 20 daily newspapers and six weekly newspapers nationwide, of which only two, the Las Vegas Review-Journal and the (Jacksonville) Florida Times-Union, had circulations of above 100,000. The small number of endorsements received by Trump was unprecedented in American history for a candidate from a major party.

Media journalist Jim Rutenberg wrote in early October 2016 that endorsements in the 2016 presidential election were distinguished by "blunt condemnation" of Trump and by a "save the Republic" tone. A handful of newspapers endorsed third party candidates, including independent candidate Evan McMullin and Libertarian Party nominee Gary Johnson; endorsing a candidate outside the two major parties is rare.

Summary of newspaper and magazine endorsements in the 2016 United States presidential election

Candidate	Daily	Weekly	Magazines	College	International	Total
Hillary Clinton	243	148	15	77	17	500
No endorsement	64	13	0	5	0	82
Not Donald Trump	8	2	4	12	4	30
Donald Trump	20	6	0	0	2	28
Gary Johnson	9	0	0	0	0	9
Split endorsement	2	0	0	0	0	2
Evan McMullin	1	0	0	0	0	1
Not Hillary Clinton	1	0	0	0	0	1

== Daily newspapers ==
=== Summary of daily newspapers ===
Candidate	Endorsements	Breakdown by 2012 endorsement
Hillary Clinton	243	99 Barack Obama; 47 Mitt Romney; 19 no endorsement; 1 split endorsement; 76 undetermined
No endorsement	64	38 Mitt Romney; 2 Barack Obama; 2 no endorsement; 11 undetermined
Donald Trump	20	14 Mitt Romney; 6 undetermined
Gary Johnson	9	2 Barack Obama; 5 Mitt Romney; 2 undetermined
Not Donald Trump	8	2 Mitt Romney; 1 Barack Obama; 4 no endorsement; 1 undetermined
Split endorsement	2	2 split endorsement
Evan McMullin	1	1 undetermined
Not Hillary Clinton	1	1 undetermined

== Weekly newspapers ==
This list includes newspapers that publish three or fewer times per week.

=== Summary of weekly newspapers ===
Candidate	Endorsements	Breakdown by 2012 endorsement
Hillary Clinton	148	46 Barack Obama; 1 Mitt Romney; 3 no endorsement; 1 Jill Stein; 97 undetermined
Donald Trump	6	3 Mitt Romney; 3 undetermined
Not Donald Trump	2	2 undetermined
No endorsement	13	9 Mitt Romney; 3 undetermined; 1 no endorsement

=== Endorsements by weekly newspapers ===
Newspaper	2016 endorsement	Largest reported circulation	Endorsement date	City	State	2012 endorsement	Notes
Dallas Voice	Hillary Clinton	13,474	September 16	Dallas	Texas	No endorsement	(Note: This was the first presidential endorsement in the Dallas Voice's 32-year history.)
The Martha's Vineyard Times	Hillary Clinton	14,000	September 28	Vineyard Haven	Massachusetts	Mitt Romney	
South Florida Gay News	Hillary Clinton	10,000	September 28	Wilton Manors	Florida	Barack Obama	
Athens News	Hillary Clinton	14,187	September 29	Athens	Ohio	Barack Obama	(Note: The Athens News publishes twice weekly.)
Falls Church News-Press	Hillary Clinton		September 29	Falls Church	Virginia	Barack Obama	
The Patriot-News	Hillary Clinton		October 6	Harrisburg	Pennsylvania	Barack Obama	(Note: The Patriot-News publishes thrice weekly)
Santa Barbara Independent	Hillary Clinton	39,234	October 6	Santa Barbara	California	Barack Obama	
La Gaceta	Hillary Clinton	18,000	October 8	Tampa	Florida		(Note: La Gaceta is "The nation's only tri-lingual newspaper" (English, Spanish, Italian).)
The Sentinel Echo	Hillary Clinton		October 10	London	Kentucky		(Note: The Sentinel Echo publishes thrice weekly; its endorsement originated with the Ashland Daily Independent, a sister paper.)
The Morehead News	Hillary Clinton		October 10	Morehead	Kentucky		(Note: The Morehead News publishes twice weekly; its endorsement originated with the Ashland Daily Independent, a sister paper.)
Derry News	Hillary Clinton	7,000	October 10	Derry	New Hampshire		(Note: An identically-worded endorsement was also published in a sister publication, The Salem News)
East Bay Express	Hillary Clinton	40,000	October 11	Berkeley	California	Barack Obama	
The Jewish Week	Hillary Clinton	45,548	October 11	New York City	New York		(Note: This is the first time the 40-year-old Jewish Week has endorsed a presidential candidate.)
The Zionsville Times-Sentinel	Hillary Clinton		October 11	Zionsville	Indiana		
Qué Pasa	Hillary Clinton	52,411	October 11	Winston-Salem, Raleigh, Charlotte	North Carolina		
The Capital Times	Hillary Clinton		October 12	Madison	Wisconsin	Barack Obama	
Suwannee Democrat	Not Donald Trump		October 12	Live Oak	Florida		(Note: The Suwannee Democrat publishes twice weekly. This editorial originally appeared in the Sunbury Daily Item, but the Suwannee Democrat "embraces its message.")
Willamette Week	Hillary Clinton	70,000	October 12	Portland	Oregon	Barack Obama	
The Madison / St. Clair Record	Hillary Clinton		October 12	Edwardsville	Illinois		
Washington Blade	Hillary Clinton	33,874	October 12	Washington	District of Columbia		
Philadelphia Gay News	Hillary Clinton	25,000	October 12	Philadelphia	Pennsylvania		
Windy City Times	Hillary Clinton	10,000	October 12	Chicago	Illinois		(Note: This is the Windy City Times' first endorsement in the past 16 years.)
Between the Lines	Hillary Clinton	20,000	October 12	Livonia	Michigan		
Bay Windows	Hillary Clinton	20,000	October 12	Boston	Massachusetts	Barack Obama	
Gay City News	Hillary Clinton	34,785	October 12	New York City	New York		
Watermark	Hillary Clinton	20,000	October 12	Orlando	Florida		
The Pride L.A.	Hillary Clinton	20,000	October 12	Los Angeles	California		
The Georgia Voice	Hillary Clinton	10,000	October 12	Atlanta	Georgia		(Note: The Georgia Voice publishes twice weekly)
Bay Area Reporter	Hillary Clinton	26,830	October 12	San Francisco	California	Barack Obama	
San Diego CityBeat	Hillary Clinton	44,000	October 12	San Diego	California	Barack Obama	
The Argonaut	Hillary Clinton	30,000	October 12	Marina del Rey	California		
The Suffolk Times	Hillary Clinton	17,038	October 12	Mattituck	New York	Barack Obama	(Note: The Riverhead News-Review and Shelter Island Reporter are sister papers to The Suffolk Times.)
Boulder Weekly	Hillary Clinton	25,000	October 13	Boulder	Colorado	Barack Obama	
The Taos News	Hillary Clinton	8,846	October 13	Taos	New Mexico	Barack Obama	
Monterey County Weekly	Hillary Clinton	36,000	October 13	Monterey County	California		
El Observador	Hillary Clinton	35,000	October 14	San Jose	California	Barack Obama	
Rockwall Herald-Banner	Hillary Clinton	14,240	October 14	Rockwall	Texas		(Note: An identical editorial also appeared in the parent publication, the Greenville Herald-Banner on October 8.)
Aurora Sentinel	Hillary Clinton	34,000	October 16	Aurora	Colorado	Barack Obama	
The Journal	Hillary Clinton	7,000	October 17	Cortez	Colorado	Barack Obama	(Note: The Journal publishes twice weekly)
The Stranger	Hillary Clinton	52,503	October 18	Seattle	Washington	Barack Obama	
Colorado Springs Independent	Hillary Clinton	36,000	October 19	Colorado Springs	Colorado	Barack Obama	
Indy Week	Hillary Clinton	32,000	October 19	Durham	North Carolina	Barack Obama	
Batesville Herald-Tribune	Hillary Clinton		October 19	Batesville	Indiana		
The Portland Mercury	Hillary Clinton	45,000	October 19	Portland	Oregon		
Jewish Ledger	Hillary Clinton	15,000	October 19	West Hartford	Connecticut		(Note: This is the first Presidential endorsement in the Jewish Ledger's 87-year existence.)
Royse City Herald-Banner	Hillary Clinton	8,000	October 19	Royse City	Texas		
The Charlotte Post	Hillary Clinton	22,305	October 19	Charlotte	North Carolina	Barack Obama	
The Washington Informer	Hillary Clinton	15,000	October 19	Washington	District of Columbia		
Chico News & Review	Hillary Clinton	38,180	October 20	Chico	California	Barack Obama	
Eugene Weekly	Hillary Clinton	35,435	October 20	Eugene	Oregon	Barack Obama	
The Skanner	Hillary Clinton	10,500	October 20	Portland	Oregon	Barack Obama	
La Raza	Hillary Clinton	153,620	October 20	Chicago	Illinois		
Connecticut Law Tribune	Not Donald Trump	1,885	October 20	Hartford	Connecticut		
The Austin Chronicle	Hillary Clinton	77,980	October 21	Austin	Texas	Barack Obama	
Wisconsin Gazette	Hillary Clinton	28,000	October 21	Milwaukee	Wisconsin		(Note: The Wisconsin Gazette publishes twice monthly.)
Q-Notes	Hillary Clinton	11,000	October 21	Charlotte	North Carolina		
Philadelphia Tribune	Hillary Clinton	15,138	October 21	Philadelphia	Pennsylvania		
San Francisco Bay Times	Hillary Clinton	25,000	October 22	San Francisco	California		
Richmond Free Press	Hillary Clinton	32,005	October 22	Richmond	Virginia		
Williamson County Sun	Hillary Clinton	9,052	October 23	Georgetown	Texas		(Note: The Williamson County Sun publishes twice weekly.)
Woodbury Bulletin	No endorsement	7,811	October 23	Woodbury	Minnesota	Mitt Romney	
Ahora Latino Journal	Hillary Clinton	6,000	October 23	Reno	Nevada		
South Washington County Bulletin	No endorsement	8,616	October 24	Cottage Grove	Minnesota	Mitt Romney	(Note: This newspaper is part of the Forum Communications Company, which owns several small community papers in MN/ND/SD/WI region. This is the first time in 50 years the newspaper group has not endorsed a Republican candidate for president.)
Farmington Independent	No endorsement	2,000	October 25	Farmington	Minnesota	Mitt Romney	
Michigan Chronicle	Hillary Clinton	20,617	October 25	Detroit	Michigan		
The St. Louis American	Hillary Clinton	70,000	October 25	St. Louis	Missouri	Barack Obama	
The Courier-Gazette	Hillary Clinton	7,431	October 25	Rockland	Maine		(Note: The Courier Publications Editorial Board also includes the Camden Herald (circulation 3,544) and Belfast Republican Journal (circulation 5,826).)
The Chicago Defender	Hillary Clinton	10,811	October 26	Chicago	Illinois		(Note: The Chicago Defender endorsed Obama in 2008.)
The Providence American	Hillary Clinton	11,000	October 26	Providence	Rhode Island		(Note: The Providence American is published monthly.)
Osakis Review	No endorsement	1,328	October 26	Osakis	Minnesota	Mitt Romney	
Alexandria Echo Press	No endorsement	9,763	October 26	Alexandria	Minnesota	Mitt Romney	
Park Rapids Enterprise	No endorsement	3,508	October 26	Park Rapids	Minnesota	Mitt Romney	(Note: Published twice weekly. This newspaper is part of the Forum Communications Company, which owns several small community papers in MN/ND/SD/WI region. This is the first time in 50 years the newspaper group has not endorsed a Republican candidate for president.)
The Georgetowner	Hillary Clinton	40,000	October 26	Washington	District of Columbia		
Baltimore Afro-American	Hillary Clinton	12,500	October 26	Baltimore	Maryland	Barack Obama	
Maui Time	Hillary Clinton	18,000	October 26	Wailuku	Hawaii	Jill Stein	
Gary Crusader	Hillary Clinton	39,000	October 27	Gary	Indiana		
New York Amsterdam News	Hillary Clinton	11,229	October 27	New York City	New York		
The Detroit Jewish News	Hillary Clinton	16,000	October 27	Detroit	Michigan		(Note: The Detroit Jewish News cited The Atlantic's decision to endorse a candidate.)
Queens Chronicle	Hillary Clinton	160,000	October 27	New York City	New York	Barack Obama	
The Ann Arbor News	Hillary Clinton	33,231	October 27	Ann Arbor	Michigan	Barack Obama	(Note: The Ann Arbor News is published twice weekly. As a part of the MLive Media Group, it is a shared editorial for several newspapers.)
The Bay City Times	Hillary Clinton	26,567	October 27	Ann Arbor	Michigan	Barack Obama	(Note: The Bay City Times and Saginaw News are published three times weekly. As a part of the MLive Media Group, it is a shared editorial for several newspapers.)
The Weston Forum	Hillary Clinton	4,100	October 27	Weston	Connecticut		
The Saginaw News	Hillary Clinton	28,489	October 27	Saginaw	Michigan	Barack Obama	
The Atlanta Jewish Times	No endorsement	55,000	October 27	Atlanta	Georgia		
The Enterprise-Tocsin	No endorsement	3,872	October 27	Indianola	Mississippi		
News & Review	Hillary Clinton	38,180	October 27	Sacramento	California	Barack Obama	
The Aegis	No endorsement	15,318	October 28	Bel Air	Maryland	Mitt Romney	(Note: The Aegis is published twice weekly. It is a part of the Baltimore Sun media group, but editorially independent. The paper has endorsed a Republican for president for the past several elections.)
The Arab American News	No endorsement	35,000	October 28	Detroit	Michigan		(Note: The Arab American News editorial notes this is the first time in their history they have declined to endorse a candidate for president.)
The Cincinnati Herald	Hillary Clinton	16,000	October 28	Cincinnati	Ohio	Barack Obama	
The Virginia Gazette	Hillary Clinton		October 29	Williamsburg	Virginia		
Wadena Pioneer Journal	No endorsement	3,124	October 29	Wadena	Minnesota	Mitt Romney	
The Wellesley Townsman	Hillary Clinton	4,665	October 29	Needham	Massachusetts		(Note: This newspaper is owned by GateHouse Media, and the same editorial was published in several of their publications.)
Hamilton Chronicle	Hillary Clinton	1,482	October 29	Danvers	Massachusetts		
Wilmington Advocate	Hillary Clinton	1,886	October 30	Concord	Massachusetts		
Abington Mariner	Hillary Clinton	1,506	October 30	Marshfield	Massachusetts		
Arlington Advocate	Hillary Clinton	4,338	October 30	Lexington	Massachusetts		
Weymouth News	Hillary Clinton	2,836	October 30	Randolph	Massachusetts		
Brookline Tab	Hillary Clinton	13,733	October 30	Brookline	Massachusetts		
Georgetown Record	Hillary Clinton	1,089	October 30	Danvers	Massachusetts		
Melrose Free Press	Hillary Clinton	2,311	October 30	Beverly	Massachusetts		
Holbrook Sun	Hillary Clinton	841	October 30	Randolph	Massachusetts		
Dover-Sherborn Press	Hillary Clinton	745	October 30	Needham	Massachusetts		
The Hingham Journal	Hillary Clinton	4,349	October 30	Hingham	Massachusetts		
Marlborough Enterprise	Hillary Clinton	2,507	October 30	Framingham	Massachusetts		
Allston/Brighton Tab	Hillary Clinton	448	October 30	Needham	Massachusetts		
Sandwich Broadsider	Hillary Clinton	2,332	October 30	Yarmouth Port	Massachusetts		
Lakeville Call	Hillary Clinton	351	October 30	Lakeville	Massachusetts		
Cohasset Mariner	Hillary Clinton	1,725	October 30	Hingham	Massachusetts		
Lexington Minuteman	Hillary Clinton	4,328	October 30	Hingham	Massachusetts		
Old Colony Memorial	Hillary Clinton	6,978	October 30	Plymouth	Massachusetts		
Danvers Herald	Hillary Clinton	2,347	October 30	Danvers	Massachusetts		
Canton Journal	Hillary Clinton	1,262	October 30	Raynham	Massachusetts		
Concord Journal	Hillary Clinton	3,971	October 30	Concord	Massachusetts		
Watertown Tab	Hillary Clinton	2,184	October 30	Needham	Massachusetts		
Milford Beacon	Hillary Clinton	3,222	October 30	Concord	Massachusetts		
Braintree Forum	Hillary Clinton	2,507	October 30	Weymouth	Massachusetts		
Chelmsford Independent	Hillary Clinton	2,355	October 30	Concord	Massachusetts		
Marblehead Reporter	Hillary Clinton	4,678	October 30	Marblehead	Massachusetts		
Walpole Times	Hillary Clinton	3,832	October 30	Walpole	Massachusetts		
Rockland Standard	Hillary Clinton	764	October 30	Marshfield	Massachusetts		
Scituate Mariner	Hillary Clinton	2,823	October 30	Marshfield	Massachusetts		
The Sudbury Town Crier	Hillary Clinton	2,961	October 30	Framingham	Massachusetts		
The Winchester Star	Hillary Clinton	2,910	October 30	Lexington	Massachusetts		
Littleton Independent	Hillary Clinton	1,197	October 30	Concord	Massachusetts		
Wakefield Observer	Hillary Clinton	538	October 30	Danvers	Massachusetts		
The Cape Codder	Hillary Clinton	7,809	October 30	Orleans	Massachusetts		
Newburyport Current	Hillary Clinton	4,921	October 30	Beverly	Massachusetts		
Malden Observer	Hillary Clinton	1,314	October 30	Medford	Massachusetts		
Somerville Journal	Hillary Clinton	2,341	October 30	Somerville	Massachusetts		
Swampscott Reporter	Hillary Clinton	1,732	October 30	Marblehead	Massachusetts		
Wayland Town Crier	Hillary Clinton	1,796	October 30	Framingham	Massachusetts		
Tewksbury Advocate	Hillary Clinton	655	October 30	Concord	Massachusetts		
Billerica Minuteman	Hillary Clinton	2,565	October 30	Concord	Massachusetts		
Fairfield Citizen	Hillary Clinton	2,799	October 30	Fairfield	Connecticut		(Note: The Fairfield Citizen publishes twice weekly. This editorial appeared in several Connecticut newspapers that are allied with the Hearst Media Group.)
Westport News	Hillary Clinton	3,680	October 30	Norwalk	Connecticut		
Easton Journal	Hillary Clinton	2,208	October 30	Easton	Massachusetts		(Note: An identical editorial also appeared in several other Massachusetts newspapers owned by Gatehouse Media.)
Norton Mirror	Hillary Clinton	1,250	October 30	Norton	Massachusetts		
Dedham Transcript	Hillary Clinton	1,041	October 31	Needham	Massachusetts		
The Chief-Leader	Hillary Clinton	30,651	October 31	New York City	New York		
Vilas County News-Review	Donald Trump	10,500	November 1	Eagle River	Wisconsin		
Santa Fe Reporter	Hillary Clinton	16,000	November 1	Santa Fe	New Mexico	Barack Obama	
The Crusader	Donald Trump	Unknown	November 1	Harrison	Arkansas		(Note: The Crusader is one of the Ku Klux Klan's newspapers. It did not officially endorse Trump, but its full page editorial is considered a de facto endorsement by many. The Trump campaign has denounced the endorsement.)
Rochester City Newspaper	Hillary Clinton	37,081	November 1	Rochester	New York	Barack Obama	
Jewish Voice	Donald Trump	30,000	November 2	New York City	New York	Mitt Romney	
The Jewish Press	Donald Trump	42,222	November 2	New York City	New York	Mitt Romney	
Lagniappe	No endorsement	30,000	November 2	Mobile	Alabama	No endorsement	
Rock River Times	Hillary Clinton	22,000	November 2	Rockford	Illinois	Barack Obama	
Metro Weekly	Hillary Clinton	17,000	November 2	Washington	District of Columbia	No endorsement	
Idaho Mountain Express	Hillary Clinton	13,000	November 2	Ketchum	Idaho	Barack Obama	
Cincinnati CityBeat	Hillary Clinton	35,000	November 2	Cincinnati	Ohio	Barack Obama	
Neshoba Democrat	Donald Trump	8,000	November 2	Philadelphia	Mississippi	Mitt Romney	
The Alibi	Hillary Clinton	32,814	November 3	Albuquerque	New Mexico	Barack Obama	
Andover Townsman	Hillary Clinton	5,339	November 3	Andover	Massachusetts		(Note: An identically worded editorial appeared in four other newspapers that are part of Community Newspaper Holdings in Massachusetts.)
New York Observer	No endorsement	38,232	November 3	New York City	New York	Mitt Romney	(Note: The Observer is owned by Trump's son-in-law, and was one of only four newspapers to endorse Trump during the Republican primaries.)
Dorchester Reporter	Hillary Clinton	6,000	November 3	Dorchester	Massachusetts	Barack Obama	
The Wilton Bulletin	Hillary Clinton	2,270	November 3	Wilton	Connecticut		
Easton Courier	Hillary Clinton	1,165	November 3	Easton	Connecticut	Barack Obama	
Creative Loafing Tampa	Hillary Clinton	48,000	November 3	Tampa Bay	Florida	Barack Obama	
Boston Irish Reporter	Hillary Clinton	8,000	November 3	Dorchester	Massachusetts	Barack Obama	(Note: The Boston Irish Reporter is published in the newspaper format monthly.)
Memphis Flyer	Hillary Clinton	45,000	November 3	Memphis	Tennessee	No endorsement	(Note: While Memphis Flyer's editorial does not explicitly endorse Clinton, the argument and tone is quite clear: "The Flyer traditionally does not endorse at election time, leaving such personal decisions to our readers. We would be remiss not to point out the essential nature of the choice at hand, which boils down to a long record of competence and experience versus a legacy of unrelenting narcissism and its resultant chaos.")
News & Review	Hillary Clinton	38,180	November 3	Reno	Nevada	Barack Obama	
News & Review	Hillary Clinton	38,180	November 3	Chico	California	Barack Obama	
Lake Placid News	Hillary Clinton	2,500	November 3	Lake Placid	New York		
The Wave	Hillary Clinton	8,341	November 4	Rockaway	New York		
Carteret County News-Times	Donald Trump	9,725	November 5	Morehead City	North Carolina		(Note: The Carteret County News-Times is published three times a week.)
Milwaukee Courier	Hillary Clinton	40,000	November 5	Milwaukee	Wisconsin		
The Ridgefield Press	Hillary Clinton	5,000	November 5	Ridgefield	Connecticut		
Inweekly	Hillary Clinton	31,860	November 7	Pensacola	Florida	Barack Obama	

== Magazines ==
=== Summary of magazines ===
Candidate	Endorsements	Breakdown by 2012 endorsement
Hillary Clinton	15	3 Barack Obama; 9 no endorsement; 3 undetermined
Not Donald Trump	4	2 no endorsement; 2 undetermined

=== Endorsements by magazines ===
Magazine	2016 endorsement	Largest reported circulation	Endorsement date	2012 endorsement	Notes
Philadelphia	Hillary Clinton	103,161	June 21	No endorsement	(Note: "This is the first time the editors of Philadelphia magazine have endorsed a presidential candidate.")
The Advocate	Hillary Clinton	187,791	July 25	Barack Obama	
Wired	Hillary Clinton	870,101	August 18	No endorsement	(Note: This is the first time Wired has endorsed a candidate in a presidential election.)
Scientific American	Not Donald Trump	399,354	September 1	No endorsement	(Note: Scientific American does not usually endorse political candidates.)
The Atlantic	Hillary Clinton	509,376	October 5	No endorsement	(Note: This is The Atlantic's third presidential endorsement in the magazine's 159-year history. Their two previous endorsements were for Abraham Lincoln in 1860 and Lyndon B. Johnson in 1964.)
The Nation	Hillary Clinton	110,007	October 5	Barack Obama	
The Reader	Hillary Clinton	150,000	October 7	No endorsement	(Note: The Reader is published quarterly. "Never in the 22-year history of The Reader have we officially backed a candidate for president.")
Foreign Policy	Hillary Clinton	101,054	October 9	No endorsement	(Note: This is the first political endorsement in Foreign Policy's 46-year history.)
Loveland Magazine	Not Donald Trump	n/a	October 10		(Note: This references the editorial by The Atlantic in their decision to publish their anti-endorsement. Loveland Magazine is online-only, but an official member of the Ohio Newspaper Association.)
Christianity Today	Not Donald Trump	120,000	October 11	No endorsement	(Note: This is not an official non-endorsement editorial. "As a non-profit journalistic organization, Christianity Today is doubly committed to staying neutral regarding political campaigns.")
World	Not Donald Trump	100,000	October 11		
Latina	Hillary Clinton	517,732	October 14	No endorsement	(Note: This is Latina's first political endorsement for any candidate in its 20-year history.)
Vogue	Hillary Clinton	1,231,931	October 18	No endorsement	(Note: This is Vogue's first political endorsement for any candidate in its 123-year history.)
Oakland Magazine	Hillary Clinton	10,440	October 21		(Note: An identical 2016 voter guide endorsing Hillary Clinton appeared on the blogs of Oakland Magazine and Alameda Magazine, both publications of Telegraph Media.)
Alameda Magazine	Hillary Clinton	10,000	October 21		
The New Yorker	Hillary Clinton	1,051,795	October 23	Barack Obama	
Variety	Hillary Clinton	30,000	November 1	No endorsement	(Note: "For the first time in its 111-year history, Variety is endorsing a presidential candidate.")
India Currents	Hillary Clinton	42,725	November 1	No endorsement	(Note: The India Currents marks the first time in 30 years that an Indian-American monthly publication has endorsed a US presidential candidate.)
India New England News	Hillary Clinton	12,000	November 3		

== College and university newspapers ==
=== Summary of student newspapers ===
Candidate	Endorsements	Breakdown by 2012 endorsement
Hillary Clinton	79	25 Barack Obama; 1 Jill Stein; 18 no endorsement; 35 undetermined
No endorsement	5	2 no endorsement; 3 undetermined
Not Donald Trump	12	3 no endorsement; 9 undetermined

=== Endorsements by student newspapers ===
Newspaper	2016 endorsement	Largest reported circulation	Endorsement date	Institution	City and state	2012 endorsement	Notes
The Miami Student	Not Donald Trump	8,000	September 16	Miami University	Oxford, Ohio	No endorsement	
The Review	Hillary Clinton	2,000	September 27	University of Delaware	Newark, Delaware		
The Rice Thresher	Hillary Clinton	3,000	September 28	Rice University	Houston, Texas		
The Bucknellian	No endorsement	4,500	September 29	Bucknell University	Lewisburg, Pennsylvania		
The Griffin	Hillary Clinton	2,500	September 30	Canisius College	Buffalo, New York		
The Daily Texan	Hillary Clinton	12,000	September 30	University of Texas at Austin	Austin, Texas	No endorsement	
The Oberlin Review	Hillary Clinton	2,000	September 30	Oberlin College	Oberlin, Ohio		(Note: The Oberlin Review's editorial argues against votes for Trump or a third party and against declining to vote.)
The Wellesley News	Hillary Clinton	1,400	October 5	Wellesley College	Wellesley, Massachusetts		(Note: As the Wellesley News noted in its editorial, Clinton is an alumna of Wellesley.)
Rocky Mountain Collegian	Hillary Clinton	6,500	October 10	Colorado State University	Fort Collins, Colorado	Barack Obama	
The Justice	Hillary Clinton	4,000	October 11	Brandeis University	Waltham, Massachusetts	Barack Obama	
The Michigan Daily	Hillary Clinton	15,000	October 11	University of Michigan	Ann Arbor, Michigan	Barack Obama	
Middlebury Campus	Hillary Clinton	4,000	October 12	Middlebury College	Middlebury, Vermont	No endorsement	(Note: Middlebury Campus endorsed Obama in 2008.)
The Inquirer	Hillary Clinton	5,000	October 12	Diablo Valley College	Pleasant Hill, California		
The Daily Free Press	Hillary Clinton	5,000	October 13	Boston University	Boston, Massachusetts	Barack Obama	
The Cornell Daily Sun	Hillary Clinton	4,000	October 13	Cornell University	Ithaca, New York		(Note: The Cornell Daily Sun endorsed Obama in 2008.)
The State News	Hillary Clinton	14,500	October 14	Michigan State University	East Lansing, Michigan	Barack Obama	
The Daily Tar Heel	Hillary Clinton	14,000	October 14	University of North Carolina	Chapel Hill, North Carolina	No endorsement	
The Kentucky Kernel	Hillary Clinton	15,000	October 16	University of Kentucky	Lexington, Kentucky	Barack Obama	
The New Mexico Daily Lobo	No endorsement	10,500	October 16	University of New Mexico	Albuquerque, New Mexico		
The Daily Californian	Hillary Clinton	10,000	October 18	University of California, Berkeley	Berkeley, California	Barack Obama	
The Daily Pennsylvanian	Hillary Clinton	6,000	October 18	University of Pennsylvania	Philadelphia, Pennsylvania	Barack Obama	(Note: The Daily Pennsylvanian made their endorsement in a joint statement with The Wellesley News. As they noted, Donald Trump and Hillary Clinton are alumni of the University of Pennsylvania and Wellesley College, respectively.)
The Pitt News	Hillary Clinton	14,000	October 18	University of Pittsburgh	Oakland, Pennsylvania	Barack Obama	
Berkeley Beacon	Hillary Clinton	800	October 19	Emerson College	Boston, Massachusetts	Barack Obama	
The Carolinian	Hillary Clinton	4,000	October 19	University of North Carolina at Greensboro	Greensboro, North Carolina		
Technician	Hillary Clinton	10,000	October 20	North Carolina State University	Raleigh, North Carolina		
University News	Hillary Clinton	7,000	October 20	Saint Louis University	St. Louis, Missouri	No endorsement	(Note: University News endorsed Obama in 2008.)
Iowa State Daily	Hillary Clinton	14,000	October 20	Iowa State University	Ames, Iowa	No endorsement	(Note: The Iowa State Daily also an editorial on why Donald Trump was unfit to be president.)
The Lamron	Hillary Clinton	3,000	October 21	State University of New York at Geneseo	Geneseo, New York	Barack Obama	
The Dartmouth	Hillary Clinton	3,800	October 21	Dartmouth College	Hanover, New Hampshire		
SUU News	Hillary Clinton	2,000	October 21	Southern Utah University	Cedar City, Utah		
Central Michigan Life	Hillary Clinton	7,000	October 23	Central Michigan University	Mt. Pleasant, Michigan	Barack Obama	
The Kent Stater	Hillary Clinton	6,750	October 23	Kent State University	Kent, Ohio	No endorsement	
Minnesota Daily	Hillary Clinton	20,000	October 26	University of Minnesota	Minneapolis, Minnesota	No endorsement	
New University	Hillary Clinton	8,000	October 25	University of California, Irvine	Irvine, California	No endorsement	
The Scribe	No endorsement	600	October 25	University of Colorado Colorado Springs	Colorado Springs, Colorado		
The Daily Northwestern	Hillary Clinton	5,500	October 26	Northwestern University	Evanston, Illinois	No endorsement	
Yale Daily News	Hillary Clinton	5,000	October 26	Yale University	New Haven, Connecticut	Barack Obama	(Note: As noted in the Yale Daily News editorial, Clinton is an alumnus of Yale.)
The Yale Record	No endorsement	500	October 26	Yale University	New Haven, Connecticut	No endorsement	(Note: In their tongue-in-cheek non-endorsement, the Yale Record noted it could not endorse due to its tax status and, consequently, "[cannot] support Clinton's impressive commitment to serving and improving this country—a commitment to which she has dedicated her entire professional career.")
The Setonian	Hillary Clinton	4,000	October 26	Seton Hall University	South Orange, New Jersey		
El Vaquero	Hillary Clinton	3,000	October 26	Glendale Community College	Glendale, California	Barack Obama	(Note: The El Vaquero endorsed Obama in 2008.)
The Post	Hillary Clinton	14,000	October 27	Ohio University	Athens, Ohio	Barack Obama	
The Beacon	Hillary Clinton	n/a	October 27	University of Portland	Portland, Oregon	Barack Obama	(Note: At the beginning of the 2016–2017 academic year, The Beacon became an all digital media organization, and print advertising is no longer be available.)
The Spectrum	Hillary Clinton	4,000	October 27	North Dakota State University	Fargo, North Dakota	No endorsement	(Note: The editorial specifically calls out the Forum Communications Company's decision to choose "none of the above" as unhelpful.)
The California Aggie	Hillary Clinton	8,000	October 27	University of California, Davis	Davis, California	No endorsement	
The Wooster Voice	Hillary Clinton	1,500	October 28	College of Wooster	Wooster, Ohio		
Daily Iowan	Hillary Clinton	19,500	October 28	University of Iowa	Iowa City, Iowa	Barack Obama	
Aztec Press	Hillary Clinton	5,000	October 28	Pima Community College	Tucson, Arizona	No endorsement	(Note: In 2012 pre-election editorial, the Aztec Press did not endorse a candidate, but did urge readers to cast their vote.)
The Georgetown Voice	Hillary Clinton	4,000	October 29	Georgetown University	Washington, District of Columbia	Jill Stein	
The Chronicle	Hillary Clinton	9,000	October 30	Duke University	Durham, North Carolina	Barack Obama	
The Current	Hillary Clinton	6,000	October 30	University of Missouri–St. Louis	St. Louis, Missouri		
The Daily Illini	Hillary Clinton	8,000	October 31	University of Illinois at Urbana–Champaign	Champaign, Illinois	No endorsement	
The DePaulia	Hillary Clinton	4,500	October 31	DePaul University	Chicago, Illinois	No endorsement	(Note: This is only the fifth time The DePaulia has issued an endorsement in its 93 year history.)
The Northern Star	Not Donald Trump	12,500	October 31	Northern Illinois University	DeKalb, Illinois		
The Daily Utah Chronicle	Not Donald Trump	12,000	October 31	University of Utah	Salt Lake City, Utah		
The Highlander	Hillary Clinton		October 31	University of California, Riverside	Riverside, California		
Marquette Wire	Hillary Clinton	3,000	November 1	Marquette University	Milwaukee, Wisconsin		(Note: A minority opinion was also published by the Marquette Wire in favor of Donald Trump.)
The Mercury	Hillary Clinton	4,500	November 1	University of Texas at Dallas	Dallas, Texas		
The Louisville Cardinal	Hillary Clinton	8,000	November 1	University of Louisville	Louisville, Kentucky	Barack Obama	
Coast Report	Hillary Clinton	15,000	November 1	Orange Coast College	Costa Mesa, California	Barack Obama	
The Villanovan	Hillary Clinton	5,000	November 1	Villanova University	Villanova, Pennsylvania		
The Collegian	Hillary Clinton	10,000	November 1	California State University, Fresno	Fresno, California		
Daily Trojan	Hillary Clinton	10,000	November 1	University of Southern California	Los Angeles		
Driftwood	Hillary Clinton	2,500	November 2	University of New Orleans	New Orleans, Louisiana		
Grand Valley Lanthorn	Not Donald Trump	8,000	November 2	Grand Valley State University	Allendale, Michigan		
The Owl	No endorsement	1,000	November 2	Doane University	Crete, Nebraska	No endorsement	
The Wayne Stater	Hillary Clinton	2,100	November 2	Wayne State College	Wayne, Nebraska		
Quinnipiac Chronicle	Not Donald Trump	2,205	November 2	Quinnipiac University	Hamden, Connecticut	No endorsement	(Note: "Throughout the 87 years of the Quinnipiac Chronicle’s existence, the editorial board has never taken a stance in a presidential election to our knowledge...this is the first time that the editorial board, as a whole, has done so.")
The Badger Herald	Hillary Clinton	15,000	November 2	University of Wisconsin–Madison	Madison, Wisconsin	No endorsement	
The Miami Hurricane	Hillary Clinton	10,000	November 2	University of Miami	Miami, Florida		
The Bates Student	Hillary Clinton	1,400	November 2	Bates College	Lewiston, Maine	No endorsement	
The Suffolk Journal	Hillary Clinton	1,500	November 2	Suffolk University	Boston, Massachusetts	No endorsement	(Note: This is only the fifth time the Suffolk Journal has endorsed a candidate since it was founded 80 years ago.)
Daily Bruin	Hillary Clinton	9,000	November 3	University of California, Los Angeles	Los Angeles	Barack Obama	
The Johns Hopkins News-Letter	Hillary Clinton	5,000	November 3	Johns Hopkins University	Baltimore, Maryland		
The Runner	Hillary Clinton		November 3	California State University, Bakersfield	Bakersfield, California		
The Cowl	Hillary Clinton	4,000	November 3	Providence College	Providence, Rhode Island		
The Marcolian	Hillary Clinton	3,000	November 3	Marietta College	Marietta, Ohio		
The New Paltz Oracle	Hillary Clinton	2,500	November 3	State University of New York at New Paltz	New Paltz, New York		(Note: SUNY (State University of New York) newspapers published a joint editorial, each one giving their different reasons for urging voters not to choose Trump, without endorsing any specific other candidate.)
The State Times	Not Donald Trump		November 3	SUNY Oneonta	Oneonta, New York		
Cardinal Points	Not Donald Trump	3,000	November 3	SUNY Plattsburgh	Plattsburgh, New York	No endorsement	
The Leader	Not Donald Trump	2,500	November 3	SUNY Fredonia	Fredonia, New York		
The Stylus	Not Donald Trump	3,500	November 3	SUNY Brockport	Brockport, New York		
The Vidette	Hillary Clinton	6,000	November 3	Illinois State University	Normal, Illinois		
The Scout	Hillary Clinton	5,500	November 4	Bradley University	Peoria, Illinois		
The Catalyst	Hillary Clinton	1,900	November 4	Colorado College	Colorado Springs, Colorado		
The Montclarion	Hillary Clinton	5,000	November 4	Montclair State University	Montclair, New Jersey		
The Red and Black	Hillary Clinton	10,000	November 4	University of Georgia	Athens, Georgia		
Fordham Observer	Hillary Clinton	2,000	November 4	Fordham University	New York City	No endorsement	
The Daily Gamecock	Not Donald Trump	6,000	November 6	University of South Carolina	Columbia, South Carolina		(Note: The Daily Gamecock supported Obama in 2008.)
The Daily Athenaeum	Hillary Clinton	15,000	November 7	West Virginia University	Morgantown, West Virginia	Barack Obama	
Columbia Chronicle	Hillary Clinton	6,500	November 7	Columbia College Chicago	Chicago, Illinois		
The Daily Cardinal	Hillary Clinton	6,500	November 7	University of Wisconsin–Madison	Madison, Wisconsin	No endorsement	
The Crimson White	Not Donald Trump	15,000	November 7	University of Alabama	Tuscaloosa, Alabama		(Note: The Crimson White supported Obama in 2008.)
The Cougar	Not Donald Trump	15,000	November 7	University of Houston	Houston, Texas		
The Penn	Hillary Clinton	6,000	November 7	Indiana University of Pennsylvania	Indiana, Pennsylvania		
The Independent Florida Alligator	Hillary Clinton	23,000	November 8	University of Florida	Gainesville, Florida		
The Emory Wheel	Hillary Clinton	5,500	November 8	Emory University	Atlanta, Georgia	Barack Obama	

== Foreign newspapers and magazines ==
=== Summary of foreign periodicals ===
Candidate	Endorsements	Breakdown by 2012 endorsement
Hillary Clinton	18	4 Barack Obama; 13 undetermined; 1 no endorsement
Donald Trump	2	2 undetermined
Not Donald Trump	4	4 undetermined

=== Endorsements by foreign periodicals ===
Periodical	2016 endorsement	Largest reported circulation	Endorsement date	City	Country	2012 endorsement	Notes
Israel Hayom	Donald Trump	550,000	March 17	Tel Aviv	Israel		
DPRK Today	Donald Trump		May 31		North Korea		
Kyiv Post	Hillary Clinton	11,000	August 4	Kyiv	Ukraine		
The Observer	Hillary Clinton	184,252	September 18	London	United Kingdom	Barack Obama	
Financial Mail	Hillary Clinton	30,662	September 29	Johannesburg	South Africa		
The Age	Hillary Clinton	182,187	October 10	Melbourne	Australia		(Note: On November 6, The Age published an additional editorial reaffirming their opposition to Donald Trump.)
The Sydney Morning Herald	Not Donald Trump	235,045	October 10	Sydney	Australia		
Sunday Independent	Hillary Clinton	199,210	October 16	Dublin	Ireland		(Note: In an editorial, the Sunday Independent "would fully endorse" P. J. O'Rourke's endorsement of Hillary Clinton.)
Nature	Hillary Clinton	52,836	October 19	London	United Kingdom		
Toronto Star	Not Donald Trump	419,236	October 20	Toronto	Canada		
The Gleaner	Not Donald Trump	267,233	October 21	Kingston	Jamaica		
The Guardian	Hillary Clinton	157,704	October 21	London	United Kingdom	Barack Obama	
The Korea Times	Hillary Clinton	300,000	October 22	Seoul	South Korea		
Financial Times	Hillary Clinton	193,553	October 31	London	United Kingdom	Barack Obama	
The Globe and Mail	Hillary Clinton	370,000	November 2	Toronto	Canada		
Waterloo Region Record	Hillary Clinton	60,435	November 4	Kitchener, Ontario	Canada		
The Economist	Hillary Clinton	1,459,929	November 5	London	United Kingdom	Barack Obama	
Times of Malta	Hillary Clinton	37,000	November 6	Valletta	Malta		
The Independent	Hillary Clinton	N/A	November 6	London	United Kingdom	No endorsement	(Note: The Independent endorsed the first U.S. presidential candidate in its 30-year history. The Independent ended daily and Sunday print publication in March, becoming an online-only newspaper.)
The Chronicle Herald	Hillary Clinton	93,178	November 7	Halifax, Nova Scotia	Canada		
Tibet Sun	Hillary Clinton		November 7	Dharamshala	India		
Daily Trust	Hillary Clinton	11,672	November 7	Abuja	Nigeria		
Daily Mirror	Hillary Clinton	897,786	November 7	London	United Kingdom		
Samoa Observer	Hillary Clinton	3,500	November 8	Apia	Samoa		(Note: The Samoa Observer editorial is from its founder, owner and editor-in-chief.)

== See also ==
- Newspaper endorsements in the United States presidential primaries, 2016
