= Brian Timpone =

American conservative news businessman

Brian Timpone is an American conservative businessman and former journalist who operates a network of nearly 1,300 conservative local news websites. In 2012, Timpone stated that articles on his websites are partially written by freelancers outside of the United States, although he described the writing as "domestic" in a separate interview. According to The New York Times, Timpone's "operation is rooted in deception, eschewing hallmarks of news reporting like fairness and transparency." His sites publish articles for pay from outside groups, and do not disclose it.

== Education and early career ==
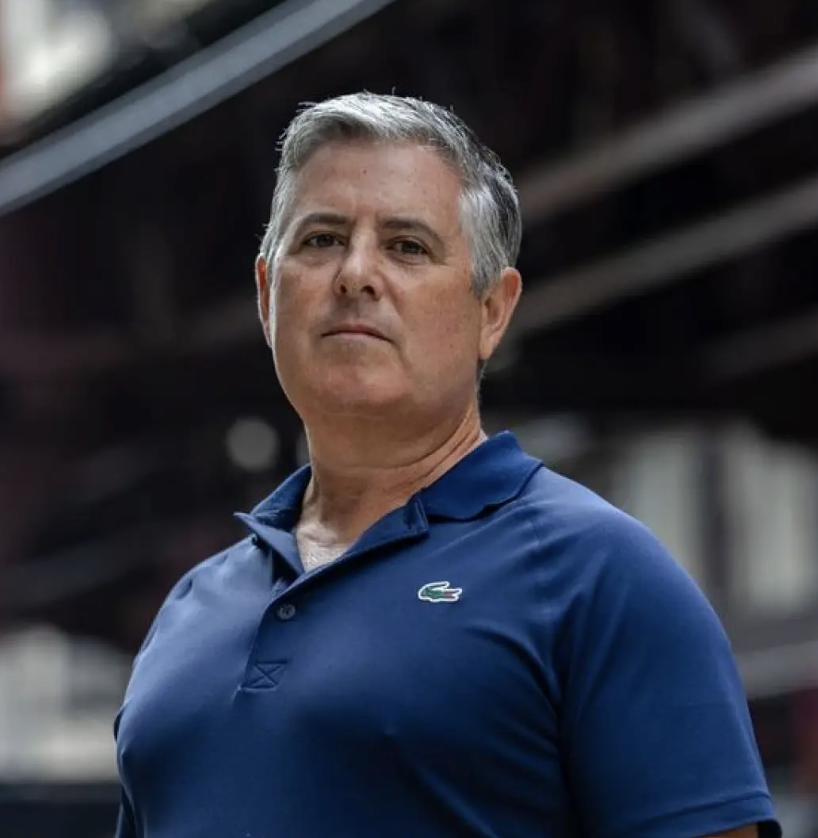
Chicago businessman Brian Timpone

Timpone graduated from Marian Catholic High School in Chicago Heights, Illinois. He received a bachelor's degree in broadcast journalism from the University of Missouri; while attending, he covered sports and news for the University-owned KOMU-TV. After school, he took a job at KDLH in Duluth, Minnesota, which he worked for less than a year before taking another TV job in Champaign, Illinois. Timpone was hired as the personal spokesman to Illinois House Minority Leader Lee A. Daniels in 1997.

== News publishing ==
Timpone is involved with a number of interconnected media companies that post press releases and lightly copied content as news articles, at one point publishing under false bylines. The process has been described as "pay for play", compared to the content farming of Demand Media, and called "'pink slime' journalism". The companies include Local Government Information Services (LGIS), of which he is president, Metric Media, Franklin Archer, Locality Labs (formerly known as Journatic and LocalLabs), DirecTech LLC, Interactive Content Services, Newsinator, Blockshopper, and The Record Inc. The companies have received funding from Liberty Principles PAC (substantially funded by Richard and Elizabeth Uihlein) and have provided services to the Illinois Opportunity Project, politician Jeanne Ives and hotelier Monty Bennett as customers.

=== The Record network ===
The Record network was started by Timpone in September 2004 with The Madison County Record, a legal journal for Madison County, Illinois. It was silently funded by the United States Chamber of Commerce's Institute for Legal Reform to oppose lawsuits against businesses and to support tort reform. The Chamber later funded a site run by The Record called Legal Newsline.As of 2021, The Record's network included: Cook County Record, Florida Record, Legal Newsline, Louisiana Record, Madison - St. Clair Record, Northern California Record, Pennsylvania Record, SE Texas Record, Southern California Record, St. Louis Record, and West Virginia Record. The mobile apps for the eleven websites at App Store (iOS/iPadOS) shows the seller to be The Record, Inc. and the copyright holder is Newsinator, LLC.

=== Journatic and BlockShopper ===
It's sort of a tattered product that's being written overseas and halfheartedly edited and just kinda slopped on the page[...]

— Ryan Smith, Journatic employee

Journatic (a portmanteau of "journalism" and "automatic") was founded by Timpone in 2006. According to Timpone, Journatic used news data processed by workers in the Philippines, but he states that the writing is "domestic". Journatic's job listings in the Philippines advertised a $0.35–0.40 pay rate per article for "writers to work on events stories" who are "able to commit to 250 pieces/week minimum". Journatic managed TribLocal, a hyperlocal news branch of the Chicago Tribune that targeted suburban neighborhoods around Chicago, in the spring of 2012.

In a June 2012 episode of This American Life, Timpone disclosed that Journatic was outsourcing its writing to over 300 freelancers using fake "Anglo-sounding" bylines in several geographic areas outside of the United States, including the Philippines, Eastern Europe, Brazil, and Africa. Following the release of the episode and the discovery of plagiarism in Journatic's articles, the Chicago Tribune, Chicago Sun-Times, Houston Chronicle, and Gatehouse Media suspended their relationships with the company. While Hearst's Houston Chronicle ended its partnership, Hearst's San Francisco Chronicle reviewed its use of the service and continued using it.

BlockShopper, also founded by Timpone in 2006, though it was merged into Journatic in 2008, was said by Timpone to be "a nod to the days when newspapers included real estate, graduations and marriage announcements". After BlockShopper published high dollar real estate sales and purchases by several high-profile people, and in some cases tied in their employer in the announcement, several anti-BlockShopper websites popped up and lawsuits were filed. Some of the targeted people said it would "[increase] the risk that baddies will rob them, steal their identities or kidnap their children." Journatic rebranded as "Locality Labs" in 2013.

=== Locality Labs and Metric Media ===
In 2019, Locality Labs delivered the Hinsdale School News to residents of Hinsdale, Illinois. The paper appropriated the logo of the local school district and had a heavy focus on articles opposing the upcoming referendum, which would have raised the school's budget. Officials from the district sent cease and desist letters to several companies in the Timpone network, stating that the use of its logos were deceptive and an instance of trademark infringement.

Building up to the 2020 United States elections, the network increased from 450 sites to over 1,200 sites. Out of 50,000 articles, 15,000 of them were unique stories, with only about 100 with human bylines. Many automated sources included federal programs (Department of Education, Department of Health and Human Services, Census Bureau) and the fuel price site Gas Buddy. Articles with heavy conservative and Republican biases would also appear in targeted areas.

In 2021, a report by Columbia Journalism Review further exposed Timpone's network of companies including Metric Media LLC, Newsinator/Franklin Archer, Local Government Information Services (LGIS), Pipeline Media, and Locality Labs (formerly known as Journatic and Blockshopper). Also disclosed were some of the financial relationships between the entities, certain individuals involved, and several political and advocacy organizations which have funded the network, all under the guise of "local news". Some of the large conservative organizations donating included Donors Trust, Donors Capital Fund, Uline and its owners Richard and Elizabeth Uihlein, and CatholicVote.org. Opining what effect this network of 'pay for play' websites has had, "Increasingly, we are seeing political campaigning which uses news as a cloak for campaigning activities potentially further undermining trust in legitimate local news outlets." Dan Kennedy of GBH News wrote, "Metric Media ... is a political play. Right-wing interests give money through a series of interlocking organizations in return for publishing indoctrination disguised as local news." Timpone's brother Michael began sharing the Metric Media website and mailing address for similar promotions.

Metric Media's websites, printed papers, robocalls, and text messages were linked to the 2022 election, notably among right-wing PACs including Tim Dunn's Defend Texas Liberty PAC, Uihlein's Illinois-centered People Who Play by the Rules PAC (run by Dan Proft), and Restoration PAC, partly funded by Uihlein. Tim Dunn is also linked to Pipeline Media. The network's printed newspapers were mailed to voters in Arizona, Kansas, and Illinois. Several publications claiming to be Catholic, with such titles as Arizona Catholic Tribune and Michigan Catholic Tribune, are unaffiliated with the Catholic dioceses in the areas they were printed. The Roman Catholic Diocese of Green Bay further noted that the Wisconsin Catholic Tribune used content from its in-house publication, The Compass, without permission in violation of copyright law.

A 2024 study by NewsGuard, a misinformation tracking company, found that "the number of partisan-backed outlets designed to look like impartial news outlets has officially surpassed the number of real, local daily newspapers in the U.S." NewsGuard identified at least 1,265 such websites "backed by dark money or intentionally masquerading as local news sites for political purposes". According to Axios, almost half of these websites are targeted to swing states, "a clear sign that they're designed to influence politics". Metric Media was noted as a major backer of partisan websites designed to look like news websites. Ahead of the 2024 United States elections, Metric distributed one-off print newspapers.

== See also ==
- Fake news
- List of fake news websites
- Propaganda through media
