= Pink-slime journalism =

Practice of publishing poor-quality outsourced reports as local news

Pink-slime journalism is a practice in which news outlets, or fake partisan operations masquerading as such, publish (often but not always) lower-quality news reports that appear to be independent local news outlets. The use of these websites to gather user data has also been observed. The reports are either computer-generated or written by poorly-paid outsourced writers, sometimes using pen names.

The term "pink-slime journalism" was coined by journalist Ryan Smith in 2012. It is supposedly named after the food industry term "pink-slime" for meat by-product typically used by an additive or filler material. A related term, "news mirage", was coined in 2024 by journalists Miranda Green and David Folkenflik to refer to websites that "look like news, but in truth [serve as] mouthpieces" for corporations or advocacy groups with a non-journalistic agenda.

== Overview ==
The name "pink slime journalism" is a reference to "pink slime", a meat by-product that is used as filler in processed meats, which are sometimes passed off as higher-quality meat in fast food restaurants.

Defining characteristics of pink slime journalism, according to Poynter, include:

- The content is generally produced by low-wage employees, automated content production, and templates. It might just list information without any analysis or context.
- Purport to cover local or hyperlocal news and to some extent are taking advantage of a decline in traditional local news.
- Many outlets are part of networks financed by partisans to push their narrative or point-of-view.

Additionally, some websites (which have been referred to as "news mirages") produce relatively high-quality work, but obscure the non-journalistic agenda of their publisher, which might be an advocacy group or self-interested corporation.

=== Content production ===
Pink-slime journalism typically involves outsourcing local news stories to low-wage employees, or using computer automation or AI to generate news stories from various datasets. Pink-slime websites can often be identified by their heavy use of automatically generated or templated content and lack of original reporting.

In 2012 writers employed by a pink-slime network were being paid between $0.35 and $24 per article; the New York Times reported in October 2020 that journalists were being paid between $3 and $36 per article.

=== Focus on local news ===
The design and naming of pink-slime news publications often resemble that of independent local news outlets.

With newspapers in decline over the past decade, dedicated pink-slime outlets have filled the voids left by shuttered local newspapers.

According to researcher Priyanjana Bengani of the Tow Center for Digital Journalism at Columbia University, pink-slime news outlets mimic local news outlets to take advantage of the trust that people tend to place in local journalism.

According to the Columbia Journalism Review, pink-slime outlets attempt to exploit people's faith in local news, as well as capitalize on the information deserts created by declining local news.

=== Use as a partisan tool ===
Pink slime websites often are financed by political partisans, and in their news content, present the candidates and policies favored by the partisans who fund the website in a favorable light, while presenting the candidates and policies disfavored by the partisans who fund the website in a negative light. Researchers and media credibility raters have observed pink-slime journalism being used to support both Republican Party and Democratic Party politicians or policies.

Scholars who study pink-slime journalism estimated in 2022 that there are many more pink-slime websites connected to conservative interests than to liberal or progressive interests, with the ratio being about "1,200 right-wing local news sites....[and] fewer than 70 left-leaning" such websites. One of the reasons for the preponderance of conservative pink-slime websites over left-leaning pink-slime websites is the existence of one major right-wing network, with over 1,000 local websites in it, headed by Brian Timpone and partially financed by Texas billionaire Tim Dunn.

According to Harvard University's Nieman Foundation for Journalism, although many such outlets claim to be independent, they are financed by "government officials, political candidates, PACs and political party operatives".

Pink-slime websites often step up their content production during election cycles.

Relative to the political purposes served by the slant of the content on these websites, the Columbia Journalism Review has additionally reported that some of these outlets appear to be used to gather data from users for political targeting purposes.

US media watchdog organization NewsGuard in June 2024 categorized most local news in the US as partisan-backed outlets designed to look like impartial ones.

=== Quantity ===
The Columbia Journalism Review identified around 450 websites that appeared to be pink-slime outlets in a December 2019 report; they reported in August 2020 that the number had almost tripled to more than 1,200 websites in the months preceding the 2020 United States presidential election.

=== Use by AI chatbots ===
In September 2026, Politico Magazine published an article based on an audit by analysts from NewsGuard examining how AI chatbots cite pink-slime outlets when asked about the 2026 United States midterm elections. The analysis found that pink-slime sites had sharply increased their output ahead of the elections, promoting articles intended to influence which party would control Congress. The analysts tested ChatGPT, Anthropic's Claude, Google Gemini, Meta AI, Microsoft Copilot, Perplexity AI, and Grok. Across all seven tools, pink-slime sites appeared among the cited sources in 48.2% of responses.

== Examples ==
The practice dates back centuries.

Journatic, founded in 2006, produced hyperlocal news content and distributed it to other publishers. The company created its articles using a combination of computer generation and low-wage writers who were not local to the areas for which they were writing. Some of these writers were poorly-paid workers from outside of the United States who were writing under fake names. Newspapers throughout the United States including the Chicago Tribune, the San Francisco Chronicle, and the Houston Chronicle had all published journalism from Journatic. Journatic's practices were exposed in 2012 in a report by This American Life, which interviewed Ryan Smith, a journalist who had been working for Journatic, and who coined the term "pink-slime journalism". The exposé also revealed Journatic's use of false bylines, fabricated quotes, and plagiarized material. Newspapers canceled their contracts with Journatic following this revelation, including the Chicago Tribune, who had laid off employees and replaced their work with articles from Journatic. Journatic rebranded to Locality Labs the following year.

Brian Timpone, who was the chief executive of Journatic, is an American businessman who runs various pink-slime networks which contribute reports to over 1,000 individual news websites. Research by the Columbia Journalism Review in December 2019 found that pink-slime networks operating hundreds of websites traced back to organizations connected to Timpone. One such organization, Metric Media, had set up 189 local news networks in ten states within a year. Other organizations included Locality Labs, Franklin Archer, the Record Inc., and Local Government Information Services; all were connected to Timpone in some way. Many of the articles distributed through these networks were right-leaning, and more than 90% of them were computer-generated or repurposed from other reports. According to the New York Times, the sites operated by Timpone's networks do not typically post false information, but "the operation is rooted in deception, eschewing hallmarks of news reporting like fairness and transparency". The sites typically do not disclose that they are funded by advocacy groups or that they are paid to run articles.

NewsGuard reported in October 2022 that left-leaning websites including The Main Street Sentinel, Courier Newsroom, and The American Independent, as well as the right-leaning Metric Media network, were running ads on social media while hiding their partisan funding and connections. The NewsGuard report referred to the newsrooms as "'pink slime' newsrooms".

In October 2024, ProPublica reported that newspapers with the word "Catholic" in their title were being distributed in five presidential battleground states -- Arizona, Michigan, Nevada, Pennsylvania, and Wisconsin. The newspapers are unaffiliated with the Catholic Church and were traced back to noted pink-slime journalism entrepreneur Brian Timpone. Much of the content of the newspapers, according to ProPublica, "undermine Vice President Kamala Harris and prop up former President Donald Trump". Another example is Lincoln Media Foundation, which is funded by the Lincoln Club, a conservative donor organization based in Orange County, California. The media group has created multiple news sites one of which shares an identical name with an existing unrelated Armenian news paper, the California Courier.

Gazette News has been accused of skirting Australia’s rules on political advertising but was cleared by the Australian Election Commission in 2025. The Light, which also publishes in Australia as well as Ireland and the UK, is subject to an inquiry about whether it is pink-slime designed to push a partisan agenda.

Hoodline, owned by San Francisco-based Nextdoor Holdings, Inc, largely uses AI to write its articles and has been accused of fabricating facts and using misleading bylines.

An Israeli-based tech start-up called Prism News launched about 200 local news websites in the United States in May 2026. These were described as "a new flavor of classic pink slime journalism."

== See also ==
- Churnalism
- Circular reporting
- Content farm
- Hack writer
