= Newspaper endorsements in the 2016 United States presidential primaries =

Newspapers and news media in the United States traditionally endorse candidates for party nomination for president of the United States, prior to endorsing one of the ultimate nominees for president. Below is a list of notable news media endorsements in 2016, by candidate, for each primary race.

== Democrats ==
=== Hillary Clinton (nominee) ===
Newspaper	State	Endorsement date	Ref.
Storm Lake Times	Iowa	January 12, 2016	
The Portsmouth Herald	New Hampshire	January 15, 2016	
Foster's Daily Democrat (Dover)	New Hampshire	January 15, 2016	
The Des Moines Register	Iowa	January 23, 2016	
Sioux City Journal	Iowa	January 23, 2016	
Concord Monitor	New Hampshire	January 24, 2016	
The Boston Globe	Massachusetts	January 24, 2016	
The Keene Sentinel	New Hampshire	January 28, 2016	
The Conway Daily Sun	New Hampshire	January 29, 2016	
Iowa City Press-Citizen	Iowa	January 29, 2016	
The New York Times	New York	January 31, 2016	
Monadnock Ledger-Transcript	New Hampshire	February 4, 2016	
The Dallas Morning News	Texas	February 12, 2016	
Tampa Bay Times (St. Petersburg)	Florida	February 12, 2016	
Houston Chronicle	Texas	February 12, 2016	
San Antonio Express-News	Texas	February 12, 2016	
Las Vegas Sun	Nevada	February 14, 2016	
Falls Church News-Press	Virginia	February 18, 2016	
Jewish Herald-Voice (Houston)	Texas	February 18, 2016	
The Greenville News	South Carolina	February 19, 2016	
Corpus Christi Caller-Times	Texas	February 21, 2016	
The Free Lance–Star (Fredericksburg)	Virginia	February 25, 2016	
Star Tribune (Minneapolis)	Minnesota	February 26, 2016	
Fort Worth Star-Telegram	Texas	February 26, 2016	
Detroit Free Press	Michigan	February 28, 2016	
Barre Montpelier Times Argus	Vermont	February 28, 2016	
Rutland Herald	Vermont	February 28, 2016	
Chattanooga Times Free Press (Times editorial)	Tennessee	February 28, 2016	
Portland Press Herald	Maine	March 1, 2016	
Indy Week (Durham)	North Carolina	March 2, 2016	
Detroit News	Michigan	March 3, 2016	
Miami Herald	Florida	March 3, 2016	
Michigan Chronicle (Detroit)	Michigan	March 3, 2016	
Orlando Sentinel	Florida	March 4, 2016	
Omaha World-Herald	Nebraska	March 4, 2016	
Kane County Chronicle (St. Charles)	Illinois	March 4, 2016	
Sun-Sentinel (Fort Lauderdale)	Florida	March 4, 2016	
The Charlotte Observer	North Carolina	March 5, 2016	
Chicago Sun-Times	Illinois	March 5, 2016	
The Clarion-Ledger (Jackson)	Mississippi	March 5, 2016	
Northwest Herald (Crystal Lake)	Illinois	March 5, 2016	
Jackson Advocate	Mississippi	March 6, 2016	
St. Louis Post-Dispatch	Missouri	March 6, 2016	
The Michigan Daily (Ann Arbor)	Michigan	March 8, 2016	
The St. Louis American	Missouri	March 9, 2016	
South Florida Gay News (Wilton Manors)	Florida	March 9, 2016	
The Cincinnati Enquirer	Ohio	March 10, 2016	
The Plain Dealer (Cleveland)	Ohio	March 10, 2016	
Akron Beacon Journal	Ohio	March 10, 2016	
The Palm Beach Post	Florida	March 11, 2016	
The Missouri Times (Jefferson City)	Missouri	March 11, 2016	
Journal Star (Peoria)	Illinois	March 13, 2016	
The Arizona Republic	Arizona	March 18, 2016	
Idaho Statesman	Idaho	March 20, 2016	
Rolling Stone	New York	March 23, 2016	
Wisconsin Gazette (Milwaukee)	Wisconsin	March 24, 2016	
The Spokesman-Review (Spokane)	Washington	March 25, 2016	
New York Amsterdam News	New York	March 31, 2016	
City Newspaper (Rochester)	New York	April 5, 2016	
The Register-Guard (Eugene)	Oregon	April 10, 2016	
New York Daily News	New York	April 12, 2016	
New York Observer	New York	April 14, 2016	
Newsday (Melville)	New York	April 15, 2016	
The Post-Standard (Syracuse)	New York	April 15, 2016	
The Post-Star (Glens Falls)	New York	April 16, 2016	
The Day (New London)	Connecticut	April 17, 2016	
The Providence Journal	Rhode Island	April 17, 2016	
Times Union (Albany)	New York	April 17, 2016	
The Philadelphia Inquirer	Pennsylvania	April 17, 2016	
Hartford Courant	Connecticut	April 17, 2016	
New Pittsburgh Courier	Pennsylvania	April 21, 2016	
Philadelphia Daily News	Pennsylvania	April 22, 2016	
The Baltimore Sun	Maryland	April 25, 2016	
The Charleston Gazette-Mail	West Virginia	April 26, 2016	
The Sacramento Bee	California	May 4, 2016	
Lexington Herald-Leader	Kentucky	May 5, 2016	
The Desert Sun (Palm Springs)	California	May 6, 2016	
Washington Blade	Washington, D.C.	May 10, 2016	
Los Angeles Times	California	May 13, 2016	
San Jose Mercury News	California	May 20, 2016	
The Fresno Bee	California	May 21, 2016	
The Santa Fe New Mexican	New Mexico	May 28, 2016	
Daily Bruin (University of California, Los Angeles)	California	May 30, 2016	
The San Diego Union-Tribune	California	June 2, 2016	

=== Bernie Sanders ===
Newspaper	State	Endorsement date	Ref.
Addison County Independent (Middlebury)	Vermont	May 22, 2015	
The Nation	New York	January 14, 2016	
The Daily Nonpareil (Council Bluffs)	Iowa	January 24, 2016	
Quad-City Times (Davenport)	Iowa	January 30, 2016	
The Daily Iowan (University of Iowa)	Iowa	February 1, 2016	
Daily Hampshire Gazette (Northampton)	Massachusetts	February 26, 2016	
The Recorder (Greenfield)	Massachusetts	February 26, 2016	
The Arab American News (Dearborn)	Michigan	March 4, 2016	
The Seattle Times	Washington	March 6, 2016	
The Athens News	Ohio	March 9, 2016	
Seattle Weekly	Washington	March 22, 2016	
Philadelphia Tribune	Pennsylvania	April 23, 2016	
The Portland Mercury	Oregon	May 2, 2016	
Willamette Week (Portland)	Oregon	May 4, 2016	
San Francisco Bay Guardian	California	May 10, 2016	
The San Francisco Examiner	California	May 19, 2016	
East Bay Express (Oakland)	California	May 25, 2016	
San Diego CityBeat	California	May 25, 2016	
Pasadena Weekly	California	June 2, 2016	

== Republicans ==
=== Jeb Bush ===
Newspaper	State	Endorsement date	Ref.
Tampa Bay Times (St. Petersburg)	Florida	January 28, 2016	
Conway Daily Sun	New Hampshire	February 3, 2016	
Houston Chronicle	Texas	February 12, 2016	
San Antonio Express-News	Texas	February 12, 2016	

=== Ben Carson ===
Newspaper	State	Endorsement date	Ref.
Jackson Advocate	Mississippi	February 29, 2016	

=== Chris Christie ===
Newspaper	State	Endorsement date	Ref.
New Hampshire Union Leader (Manchester)	New Hampshire	November 28, 2015 (retracted February 29, 2016)	
Boston Herald	Massachusetts	January 25, 2016	

=== Ted Cruz ===
Newspaper	State	Endorsement date	Ref.
National Review	New York	March 11, 2016	
The Missouri Times (Jefferson City)	Missouri	March 11, 2016	
The New York Sun	New York	April 15, 2016	

=== John Kasich ===
Newspaper	State	Endorsement date	Ref.
Storm Lake Times	Iowa	January 12, 2016	
The Portsmouth Herald	New Hampshire	January 15, 2016	
Foster's Daily Democrat (Dover)	New Hampshire	January 15, 2016	
Nashua Telegraph	New Hampshire	January 17, 2016	
The Daily Nonpareil (Council Bluffs)	Iowa	January 24, 2016	
Valley News (West Lebanon)	New Hampshire	January 24, 2016	
The Boston Globe	Massachusetts	January 25, 2016	
Concord Monitor	New Hampshire	January 26, 2016	
The Keene Sentinel	New Hampshire	January 27, 2016	
Iowa City Press-Citizen	Iowa	January 29, 2016	
The New York Times	New York	January 30, 2016	
Quad-City Times (Davenport)	Iowa	January 30, 2016	
Monadnock Ledger-Transcript	New Hampshire	February 4, 2016	
The Dallas Morning News	Texas	February 12, 2016	
The State (Columbia)	South Carolina	February 17, 2016	
The Post and Courier (Charleston)	South Carolina	February 18, 2016	
Waco Tribune-Herald	Texas	February 21, 2016	
The Free Lance-Star (Fredericksburg)	Virginia	February 25, 2016	
Daily Hampshire Gazette (Northampton)	Massachusetts	February 25, 2016	
Detroit Free Press	Michigan	February 28, 2016	
Portland Press Herald	Maine	February 29, 2016	
The Neshoba Democrat	Mississippi	March 2, 2016	
Detroit News	Michigan	March 3, 2016	
Lexington Herald-Leader	Kentucky	March 3, 2016	
The Cincinnati Enquirer	Ohio	March 4, 2016	
Chicago Sun-Times	Illinois	March 5, 2016	
The Clarion-Ledger (Jackson)	Mississippi	March 5, 2016	
Idaho Statesman (Boise)	Idaho	March 5, 2016	
The Seattle Times	Washington	March 6, 2016	
The Plain Dealer (Cleveland)	Ohio	March 10, 2016	
Akron Beacon Journal	Ohio	March 10, 2016	
Journal Star (Peoria)	Illinois	March 13, 2016	
The Arizona Republic	Arizona	March 18, 2016	
The Spokesman-Review (Spokane)	Washington	March 25, 2016	
Milwaukee Journal Sentinel	Wisconsin	March 29, 2016	
The Register-Guard (Eugene)	Oregon	April 10, 2016	
New York Daily News	New York	April 13, 2016	
Queens Tribune	New York	April 15, 2016	
The Post-Standard (Syracuse)	New York	April 15, 2016	
Hartford Courant	Connecticut	April 17, 2016	
The Post-Star (Glens Falls)	New York	April 17, 2016	
Times Union (Albany)	New York	April 17, 2016	
The Daily Gazette (Schenectady)	New York	April 17, 2016	
The Providence Journal	Rhode Island	April 20, 2016	
The Bulletin (Bend)	Oregon	April 21, 2016	
The Sentinel (Lewistown)	Pennsylvania	April 23, 2016	
The Philadelphia Inquirer	Pennsylvania	April 24, 2016	
The Baltimore Sun	Maryland	April 25, 2016	
The Source Weekly (Bend)	Oregon	April 27, 2016	
Charleston Gazette-Mail	West Virginia	April 27, 2016	
The Sacramento Bee	California	May 4, 2016	
The Desert Sun (Palm Springs)	California	May 6, 2016	

=== Ronald Reagan (write-in) ===
Although Reagan died in 2004, one newspaper recommended a write-in vote for him to protest against Donald Trump.

Newspaper	State	Endorsement date	Ref.
The San Diego Union-Tribune	California	June 2, 2016	

=== Marco Rubio ===
Newspaper	State	Endorsement date	Ref.
The Des Moines Register	Iowa	January 23, 2016	
Sioux City Journal	Iowa	January 23, 2016	
The Eagle-Tribune (North Andover)	Massachusetts	January 31, 2016	
Las Vegas Review-Journal	Nevada	February 5, 2016	
The Lowell Sun	Massachusetts	February 6, 2016	
Boston Herald	Massachusetts	February 22, 2016	
The Republican (Springfield)	Massachusetts	February 24, 2016	
San Antonio Express-News	Texas	February 24, 2016	
Fort Worth Star-Telegram	Texas	February 25, 2016	
Arkansas Democrat-Gazette (Little Rock)	Arkansas	February 26, 2016	
Star Tribune (Minneapolis)	Minnesota	February 26, 2016	
Pensacola News Journal	Florida	February 27, 2016	
Richmond Times-Dispatch	Virginia	February 27, 2016	
Chattanooga Times Free Press (Free Press editorial)	Tennessee	February 28, 2016	
Savannah Morning News	Georgia	February 28, 2016	
The Tampa Tribune	Florida	February 28, 2016	
Miami Herald	Florida	March 2, 2016	
Orlando Sentinel	Florida	March 4, 2016	
Kane County Chronicle (St. Charles)	Illinois	March 4, 2016	
St. Louis Post-Dispatch	Missouri	March 5, 2016	
Northwest Herald (Crystal Lake)	Illinois	March 6, 2016	
Chicago Tribune	Illinois	March 9, 2016	

=== Donald Trump (nominee) ===
Newspaper	State	Endorsement date	Ref.
National Enquirer	New York	March 8, 2016	
Rockland County Times	New York	April 7, 2016	
New York Observer	New York	April 12, 2016	
New York Post	New York	April 14, 2016	
Santa Barbara News-Press	California	June 2, 2016	

== See also ==
- Newspaper endorsements in the United States presidential election, 2016
