= The Madison / St. Clair Record =

Newspaper based in Illinois

- Type: Weekly newspaper
- Owner(s): Madison County Record, LLC
- Founder: Brian Timpone
- Founded: September 2004
- Headquarters: 21118 Plum Grove Rd., #190 Elk Grove Village, IL 60008
- Website: legalnewsline.com/madison-stclair-record

The Madison / St. Clair Record, also called The Record and formerly called The Madison County Record, is a weekly legal journal covering the Madison and St. Clair County Civil Courts in the state of Illinois with subsidiaries covering other counties, states and the country.

== Subsidiaries ==
It owns similar sites: Northern California Record, Southern California Record, Florida Record, Louisiana Record, Pennsylvania Record, West Virginia Record, Southeast Texas Record, Cook County Record, and St. Louis Record, and a national site, Legal Newsline. Their Privacy Policies all list the Madison County Record as owner.

== History ==
The Record was started by Timpone in September 2004 with The Madison County Record, a legal journal for Madison County, Illinois. It was silently funded by the United States Chamber of Commerce's Institute for Legal Reform to oppose lawsuits against businesses and to support tort reform. The Chamber later funded a site run by The Record called Legal Newsline.

== Staff ==
As of 2011, it was located at 301 N. Main Street, Edwardsville, Illinois, with a staff consisting of publisher Brian Timpone, editor Ann Knef, senior writer Bethany Krajelis, office manager, Stacey Strojny and courts reporter Christina Stueve.

As of 2026, it was at 300 S Riverside Plaza Suite 1625, Chicago, IL
