= Dan Proft =

American journalist

Personal details
- Born: April 29, 1972 (age 54) Oak Park, Illinois
- Party: Republican
- Education: Northwestern University; Loyola University

Daniel K. Proft (born April 29, 1972) is an American political commentator and activist. A member of the Republican Party, he is a talk radio host for Chicago radio station WIND and was a candidate for Governor of Illinois in 2010. He voices a political commentary, "Sixty Seconds of Sanity" on the Salem Radio Network. He is also the president of Local Government Information Systems, an entity controlling sites like Kendall County Times and Will County Gazette. Proft also founded, funds, and publishes the Chicago Contrarian website.

== Early life and education ==
Proft was born in 1972 in Oak Park, Illinois. He was raised in Wheaton, Illinois, and attended Benet Academy in Lisle. He graduated from Northwestern University with a B.A. and attended Loyola University Chicago School of Law at night and earned Juris Doctor degree. At Northwestern, Proft co-founded the Northwestern Chronicle, an independent campus newspaper. He also ran a conservative speakers bureau.

== Professional life ==
=== Media ===
Proft is a radio talk show host with AM 560 The Answer in Chicago. He co-hosted the morning drive show with Amy Jacobson from March 2015 until July 2025 when Jacobson separate from the radio station. He voices a political commentary, "Sixty Seconds of Sanity" on the Salem Radio Network.

Dan Proft hosts the morning drive show from 5 to 9 a.m. Monday through Friday on AM 560 The Answer in Chicago.

From 2011 to 2015, Proft was a political commentator for WLS-AM 890 radio in Chicago. From 2014 to 2015, he shared a weekday show from 5 to 9 a.m. with Bruce Wolf. After his contract expired, he moved to AM 560 WIND. He has also appeared on Chicago television including ABC 7 Chicago and Fox Chicago and his commentary has been featured on national outlets including Fox News Channel, MSNBC, and CNBC.

Additionally, Proft runs Upstream Ideas, a media group that runs a series of web and radio-based programs where Proft discusses regional and national politics and policy.

On August 8, 2018, Proft interviewed former White House Communication Director and Press Secretary Sean Spicer about his "tempestuous time in President Trump’s White House." The interview was filmed for Proft's interview series Against the Current on the digital platform Upstream Ideas. On June 2, 2023, he interviewed the Speaker of the House, Kevin McCarthy. This was one day before President Biden signed the Fiscal Responsibility Act, legislation lifting the debt ceiling, that originated out of the House.

=== Politics and policy ===
Proft is a co-founder of the Illinois Opportunity Project, a 501(c)(4) organization that promotes free-market public policy solutions.

After helping the town president of Cicero, Illinois win a close election, Proft received no-bid contracts worth $578,000 a year to serve as the spokesman for the town and two local school districts. The town also agreed to pay the company another $308,000 a year to promote the new Municipal Complex.

Proft served as the chairman and Treasurer for Illinois Liberty Principles PAC, a Super PAC organized "to make independent expenditures in support of liberty oriented policies and candidates." The PAC received criticism after it sent political mailings in newspaper form to voters ahead of the 2016 primary elections, publishing eight separate periodic mailings. Illinois's State Board of Elections rejected claims against Liberty PAC for alleged violations of campaign finance law, but its funding of Metric Media's pseudo news site articles was required to be disclosed.

Proft is also on the board of Truth in Accounting, a nonprofit dedicated to accurate public sector accounting and budgeting.

Prior to his campaign for Governor, Proft was a Republican consultant working on numerous political campaigns and served in various leadership capacities in state and municipal government.

Proft has faced criticism for emails he sent to Tea Party groups in Illinois.

On July 11, 2016, the Chicago Tribune published an op-ed written by Proft concerning the 2016 shooting of Dallas police officers. In the article, he criticized the media's coverage of both the Dallas shootings and the shootings of black men by police officers. He wrote that "There is plenty of intellectual room between 'cops can do no wrong' and 'cops are all racists waging war against minorities.' The reasoned room in between is occupied by most of the Americans who are not on television, radio or Twitter."

Proft supported the candidacy of Jeanne Ives in her primary campaign against incumbent Illinois Governor Bruce Rauner. At a campaign appearance in January 2018, Ives thanked Proft and said, "By far, Dan is one of the most engaging radio host, providing a daily dose of morning entertainment." In February 2018, Ives ran a controversial TV ad called "Thank you, Bruce Rauner" that "created a firestorm in the March Republican Primary for governor." In the ad, she attacked Governor Bruce Rauner over his policy decisions on abortion, transgender rights, and immigration. Proft defended the TV ad, saying, "Not everybody's tone or sensibility is the same, so people are going to take things differently. But in terms of the veracity of the statements in the ad and the representations, the characterizations of issues and issue positions the governor has taken, that's all factual."

Proft also serves on the board of directors for USO of Illinois, a nonprofit that provides assistance to Illinois military families and Aid for Women, a Catholic pregnancy center in Chicago. He is also on the advisory board of the Center for Civic Leadership at Benedictine University. He was on the board of disability advocacy group Envision Unlimited until he was removed after mocking the teenage son of Tim Walz and his emotional reaction to his father's speech at the 2024 Democratic National Convention.

== 2010 Illinois gubernatorial campaign ==
On June 23, 2009, Proft announced his candidacy for Governor of Illinois on the "Don Wade & Roma Show" on WLS (AM). The tagline of Proft's campaign was "Illinois isn't broken. It's fixed," signifying Illinois' government is set up to serve the politicians in power, not the people. He called for "policy revolution" to slice state personal and corporate income taxes in half and abolish the estate tax, to freeze spending and only allow it to increase based on inflation and population growth, and to implement a statewide opportunity scholarship program.

Proft earned 7.78% of the vote, coming in sixth in a seven-way Republican primary race. He later told Chicago Magazine that the worst part of running for office was raising money. He self-financed his campaign for $125,285.

== Personal life ==
Proft is a practicing Catholic who was adopted as a baby. He was born nearly 9 months before the Supreme Court decision on Roe vs. Wade which has been an important influence on his life. Since selling his Chicago condo in 2022, he lives full time in Naples, FL and has registered his People Who Play By The Rules PAC at his address.
