= Herald-Banner =

- Type: Daily newspaper
- Format: Broadsheet
- Owner: Community Newspaper Holdings Inc.
- Publisher: Lisa Chappell
- Editor: Kent Miller
- Founded: 1869, as Greenville Herald
- Headquarters: 2305 King Street; Greenville, Texas 75401; United States
- Circulation: 1,845 (as of 2023)
- Website: heraldbanner.com

The Herald-Banner is an American three-day newspaper published in Greenville, Texas, covering Hunt County. It publishes on Tuesday, Thursday, and Saturday.

The newspaper is published by CNHI, Inc. The Herald-Banner also publishes two weekly newspapers: Rockwall County Herald-Banner and Royse City Herald-Banner.

== History ==
John C. Bayne began publishing The Herald, a weekly newspaper, in Hunt County in 1869. In 1879, Franklin P. Alexander, the future speaker of the Texas House of Representatives, established the Greenville Herald, also known as the Herald. His paper was considered the "leading paper of Northeast Texas" for its time. Alexander sold the Herald to James H. Davis in 1883. In 1890, the daily Morning Herald was begun under editor Edwin W. Harris, publishing alongside the weekly newspaper. The two newspapers eventually merged under the Morning Herald ownership of the W.C. Poole family.

Another Bayne paper, the Independent (est. 1875), was renamed the Independent Banner when J.F. Mitchell bought it from Bayne in 1882. It became a daily named the Evening Banner in 1894 under the ownership of R.C. Dial, who sold the property to Fred Horton in 1907.

Harte-Hanks Newspapers bought the Evening Banner from the Horton family in 1954, sparking a competition between the crosstown Banner and Herald. After two years, the company bought the Morning Herald from the Poole family in 1956, merging the two papers as the Herald-Banner. A court case followed, with Harte-Hanks accused of unfair competition; the chain was acquitted of the charges.

Harte-Hanks sold the newspaper to Worrell Enterprises in 1988. The American Publishing Company (later Hollinger International) purchased the paper from Worrell in 1991. Hollinger sold the paper to Community Newspaper Holdings in 2000.

The Herald-Banner was named the 2024 CNHI National Newspaper of the Year and General Excellence and Sweepstakes award winner from the Texas Press Association in 2026.
