= West Virginia Record =

The West Virginia Record, founded in 2005, is a weekly legal publication funded by the United States Chamber of Commerce, the largest lobbyist group in the United States, and distributed in the state of West Virginia.

The Record is a product of the U.S. Chamber of Commerce's Institute for Legal Reform. It is distributed statewide and covers subjects of interest to the legal community. The Record, along with other publications by the Chamber of Commerce including the Southeast Texas Record, the Louisiana Record, among others, takes an editorial viewpoint that is conservative and strongly favors tort reform in order to reduce the ability of plaintiffs to bring litigation, particularly for negligence, and to reduce damages that can be received.

According to a lawsuit filed against the Record in August 2006, the Record is published by an Illinois company, the Madison County Record Inc. The president of that company is Stanton D. Anderson, who is also senior counsel to the president of the U.S. Chamber of Commerce.
