= Liberty Principles PAC =

Conservative super PAC

Liberty Principles PAC was a conservative, Illinois-based super PAC (political action committee). The PAC supported political candidates for state and local offices in Illinois who "are committed to the economic liberty policy agenda." The PAC is an independent expenditure PAC, which means that it cannot coordinate with candidates that supported.

== About ==
The chairman and treasurer was Dan Proft. The idea behind Liberty Principles PAC, according to Proft, was to "improve the quality of policy thinking" and "change the balance of power in the Illinois General Assembly."

== Political activity ==
According to the Chicago Sun-Times, the PAC "has become a chief conduit for allies of Rauner to influence legislative races across the state." Donors include shipping magnate Richard Uihlein and Governor Bruce Rauner. Uihlein is the PAC's largest contributor.

Chairman Proft and Richard Uihlein are associated with the Illinois Policy Institute, an economic conservative think tank. The think tank released a documentary in 2016 that criticized the policies of Illinois House Speaker Michael Madigan. It also passed funds to the PAC.

In addition to funding candidates in 2016 (the "Economic Liberty Candidates), Liberty Principles PAC was also active in the 2012 and 2014 election cycles.

The Uihleins provided over $17 million in funding to the PAC between 2012 and 2020, with more than half of that coming in 2018.

During the 2019 primaries, four of the five candidates the PAC opposed survived their primaries. After the PAC was unable to account for $39,000 in expenses and was out of money, it shut down in 2020.

== Legal Action ==
State Rep. Scott Drury (D-Highwood) filed the suit in October 2014 in Cook County Circuit Court against Liberty Principles PAC and Dan Proft, a political commentator and morning show host for WLS-890. Liberty Principles PAC, for which Proft serves as Chairman and Treasurer, was also named as a defendant. The case was initially dismissed in 2017. An Illinois appellate panel later revived the defamation suit filed by Loevy & Loevy attorney and former Illinois Rep. Scott Drury against Dan Proft and The Liberty Principles PAC, finding a lower court erred in granting the defendants summary judgment before resolving a discovery dispute. Reversing a summary judgment win for the Liberty Principles PAC and Dan Proft, a Chicago radio host and former Republican candidate for Illinois governor, the appellate court said on Tuesday that a Cook County judge abused their discretion when they resolved the case before ruling on Drury’s motion to compel discovery, saying the defendants have conceded that some of the discovery sought in that request was relevant to the issue of actual malice, a central issue of the summary judgment motion.
