= List of newspapers in Michigan =

This is a list of newspapers in Michigan.

== Daily and weekly newspapers (currently published) ==
- The Alcona Review - Harrisville
- Cadence Newspaper - Ada
- The Daily Telegram - Adrian
- Michigan Christian Advocate - Adrian
- Siena Heights University Spectra - Adrian
- The Recorder - Albion
- The Allegan County News - Allegan
- Grand Valley Lanthorn - Allendale
- The Alpena News - Alpena
- The Ann Arbor Independent - Ann Arbor
- The Ann Arbor News - Ann Arbor
- The Michigan Daily - Ann Arbor, University of Michigan
- Monroe Street Journal - Ann Arbor, University of Michigan, Ross School of Business
- Montmorency County Tribune - Atlanta
- Huron Daily Tribune - Bad Axe
- Huron County View - Bad Axe
- Lake County Star - Baldwin
- Battle Creek Enquirer - Battle Creek
- The Bay City Times - Bay City
- The Michigan Communist Paper - Bay City
- Beaverton Clarion - Beaverton
- The Antrim Review - Bellaire
- Belleville Area Independent - Belleville
- Belleville Enterprise - Belleville
- The Eagle - Belleville
- Northeast Advance - Belmont
- Benton Spirit - Benton Harbor
- The Herald-Palladium - Benton Harbor
- Woodward Talk - Berkley
- The Journal Era - Berrien
- Birmingham-Bloomfield Eagle - Beverly Hills
- The Pioneer - Big Rapids
- Birmingham-Bloomfield Eagle - Bingham Farms
- Birch Run/Bridgeport Herald - Birch Run
- Birmingham-Bloomfield Eagle - Birmingham
- Blissfield Advance - Blissfield
- Birmingham-Bloomfield Eagle - Bloomfield Hills
- Birmingham-Bloomfield Eagle - Bloomfield Township
- The Boyne City Gazette - Boyne City
- Birch Run/Bridgeport Herald - Bridgeport
- Inside Business Journal - Brighton
- Bay Mills News - Brimley
- The Exponent - Brooklyn
- Brown City Banner - Brown City
- Berrien County Record - Buchanan
- Burton View - Burton
- The South Independent - Byron
- Southwest Advance - Byron Center
- Cadillac Evening News - Cadillac
- The Sun & News - Caledonia
- Southeast Advance - Caledonia
- The Eagle - Canton
- Canton Observer - Canton and Canton Township
- Tuscola County Advertiser - Caro
- Carson City Gazette - Carson City
- Cadence Newspaper - Cascade
- Cass City Chronicle - Cass City
- Cassopolis Vigilant - Cassopolis
- The Cedar Springs Post - Cedar Springs
- Northeast Advance - Cedar Springs

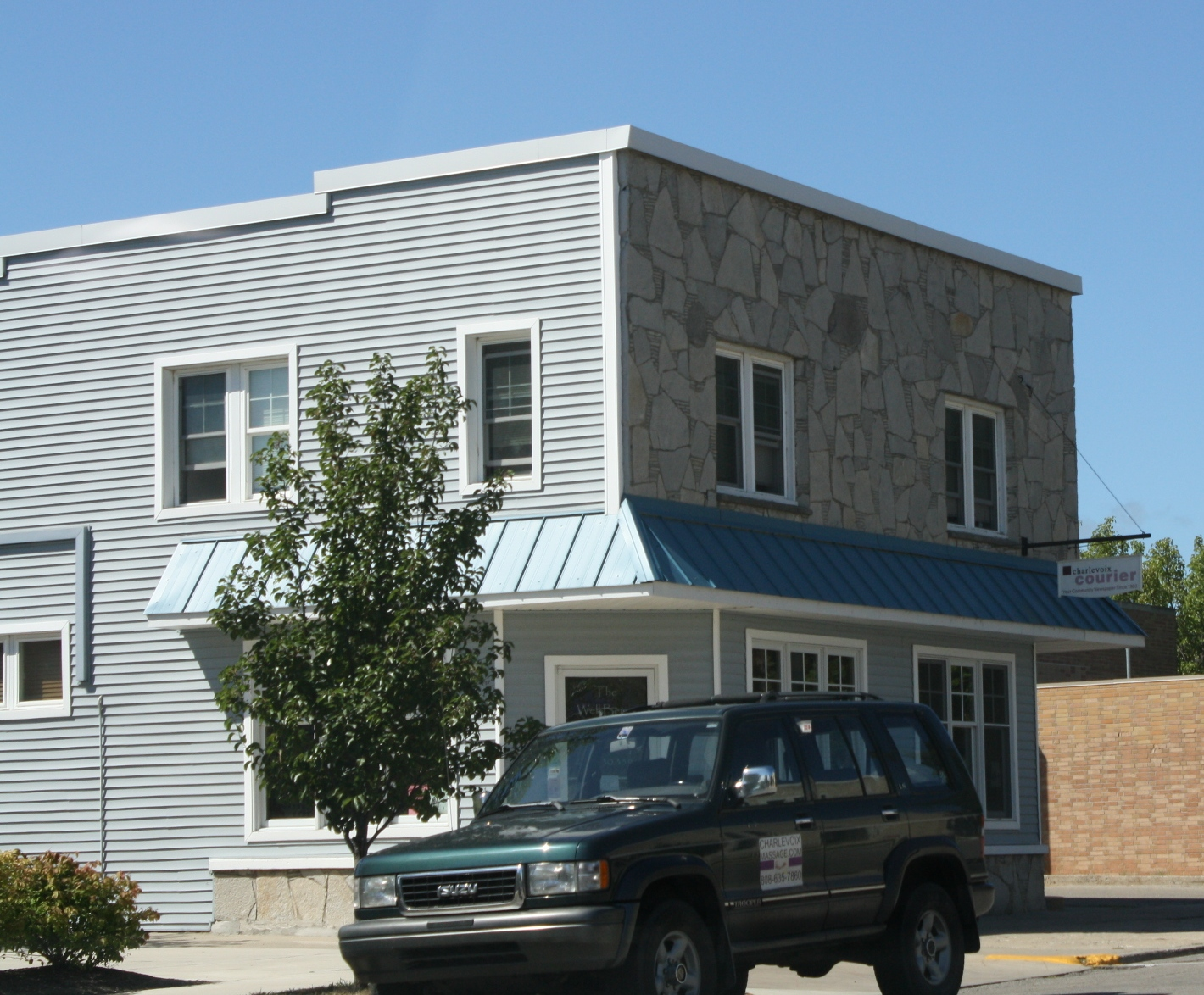
Charlevoix Courier building

- Warren Weekly - Center Line
- Central Lake News - Central Lake
- Central Michigan Life - Central Michigan University
- Charlevoix Courier - Charlevoix
- Community Newspaper - Charlotte
- Eaton Rapids Community News - Charlotte
- The County Journal - Charlotte
- Cheboygan Daily Tribune - Cheboygan
- Straitsland Resorter - Cheboygan
- The Sun Times News - Chelsea
- Tri-County Citizen - Chesaning
- The North Independent - Chesaning
- The Clare County Review - Clare
- Clarkston News - Clarkston
- Clawson Mirror - Clawson
- Royal Oak Review - Clawson
- Climax Crescent - Climax
- Clinton Local - Clinton
- Clinton Township Chronicle - Clinton Township
- Mount Clemens-Clinton-Harrison Journal - Clinton Township
- Fraser-Clinton Twp. Chronicle - Clinton Township
- The Daily Reporter - Coldwater
- Northwest Advance - Coopersville
- The Herald (Discontinued in 2017) - Cornerstone University
- The North Independent - Corunna
- Southeast Advance - Cutlerville
- Davison Index - Davison
- Dearborn Times-Herald - Dearborn
- Iraq Sun (Described as defunct in this wiki article) - Dearborn
- Press and Guide - Dearborn
- Sada al-Watan (Arab American News) - Dearborn
- Delta Collegiate - Delta College
- Advertiser Times - Detroit
- Between the Lines - Detroit
- Crain's Detroit Business - Detroit
- De Mujer A Mujer - Detroit
- Detroit Free Press - Detroit

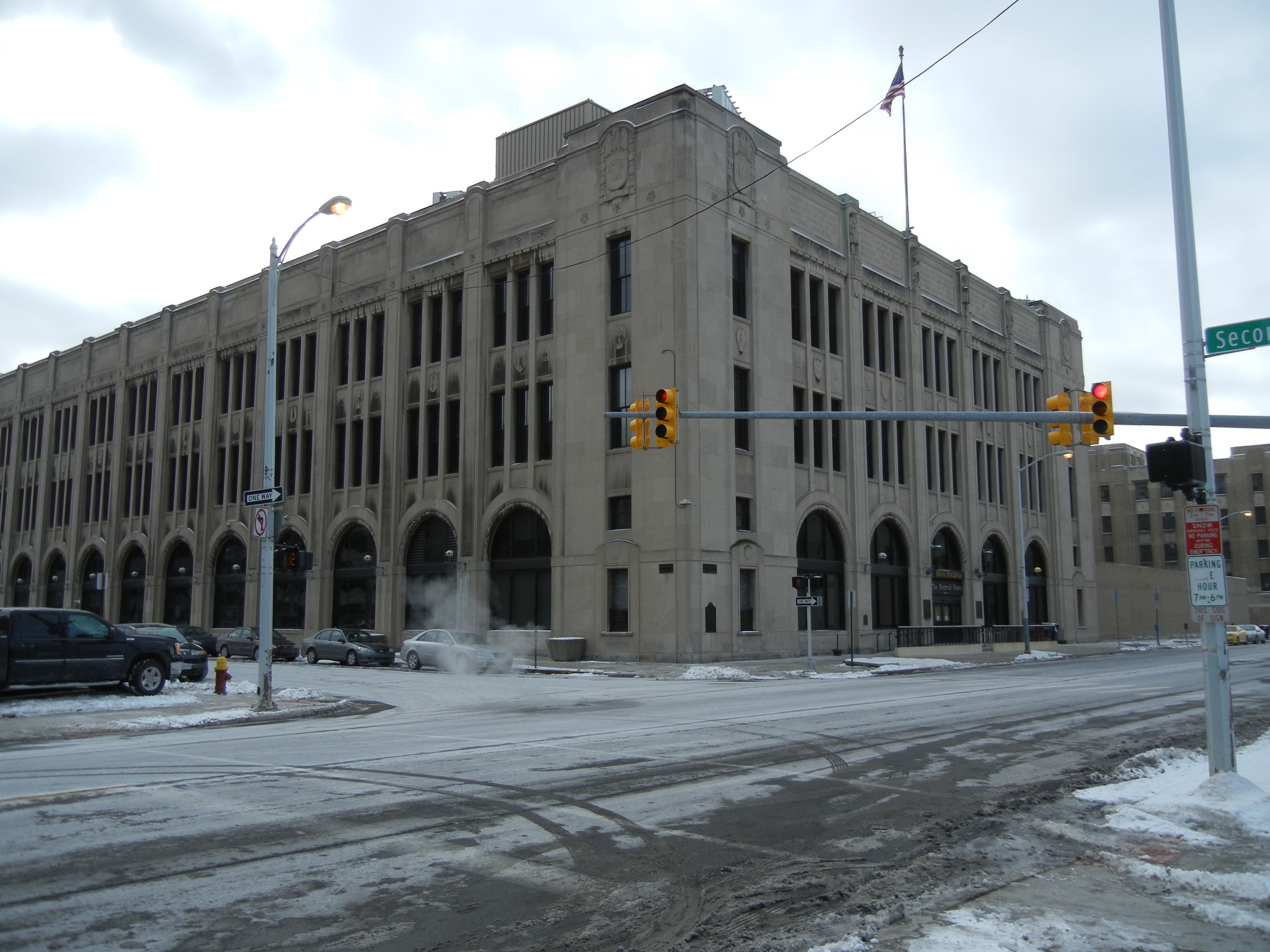
The Detroit News and Free Press building

- The Jewish News - Detroit
- The Detroit News - Detroit
- Dziennik Polski, The Polish Daily News - Detroit (1904)
- El Central Hispanic News - Detroit
- La Prensa - Detroit
- Latino Press - Detroit
- Legal Advertiser - Detroit
- Metro Times - Detroit
- Michigan Chronicle - Detroit
- Polish Weekly - Detroit
- Real Detroit Weekly (Ceased 2014) - Detroit
- Penasee Globe - Dorr
- Daily News - Dowagiac
- Drummond Island Digest - Drummond Island
- The Independent - Dundee
- The South Independent - Durand
- Southeast Advance - Dutton
- Cadence Newspaper - East Grand Rapids
- The State News - East Lansing, Michigan State University
- Roseville-Eastpointe Eastsider - Eastpointe
- Iosco County News-Herald - East Tawas
- The Eastern Echo - Eastern Michigan University
- Flashes Advertising & News - Eaton Rapids
- Telegram Newspaper - Ecorse
- Edwardsburg Argus - Edwardsburg
- Town Meeting - Elk Rapids
- The Daily Press - Escanaba
- Farmington Observer - Farmington
- The Hills Herald - Farmington Hills
- Farmington Press - Farmington and Farmington Hills
- Fenton Patch - Fenton
- Tri-County Times - Fenton
- Ferris State University/ The Torch - Ferris State University
- The Flint Journal - Flint
- Flint Township View - Flint Township
- Cadence Newspaper - Forest Hills
- Fowlerville News and Views - Fowlerville
- The Flushing Observer - Flushing
- Frankenmuth News - Frankenmuth
- Benzie County Record Patriot - Frankfort
- Birmingham-Bloomfield Eagle - Franklin
- Fraser-Clinton Twp. Chronicle - Fraser
- Times Indicator - Fremont
- Garden City Observer - Garden City
- Otsego County Voice - Gaylord
- Gaylord Herald Times - Gaylord
- Beaverton Clarion - Gladwin
- Gladwin County Record - Gladwin
- Grand Blanc View - Grand Blanc
- Grand Haven Tribune - Grand Haven
- Community News - Grand Ledge
- El Informador - Grand Rapids
- El Vocero Hispano - Grand Rapids
- Grand Rapids Business Journal - Grand Rapids
- The Grand Rapids Press - Grand Rapids
- Grand Rapids Times - Grand Rapids
- Latino News - Grand Rapids
- Lazo Cultural - Grand Rapids
- Cadence Newspaper - Grand Rapids (northeast) Ada
- Collegiate (newspaper) - Grand Rapids Community College
- Grand Rapids Township -- Cadence Newspaper
- Grand Valley Lanthorn - Grand Valley State University
- Times of Grass Lake - Grass Lake
- Grand Valley Advance - Grandville
- The Grass Lake Times - Grass Lake
- Crawford County Avalanche - Grayling
- The Daily News - Greenville
- Grosse Pointe News - Grosse Pointe
- Grosse Pointe Times - Grosse Pointe
- Penasee Globe - Gun Lake
- Hamtramck Review - Hamtramck
- The Lakeshore Guardian - Harbor Beach
- Harbor Light - Harbor Springs
- Advertiser Times - Harper Woods
- Clare County Cleaver - Harrison
- Mount Clemens-Clinton-Harrison Journal - Harrison Township
- Alcona County Review - Harrisville
- Oceana's Herald-Journal - Hart
- Hastings Banner - Hastings
- Madison-Park News - Madison Heights
- The North Independent - Henderson
- Henry Ford College/ Mirror News - Henry Ford College
- Spinal Column Newsweekly - Highland
- Hillsdale Daily News - Hillsdale
- The Collegian - Hillsdale College
- Montmorency County Tribune - Hillman
- The Collegian - Hillsdale
- The Holland Sentinel - Holland
- Holt Community News - Holt
- Homer Index - Homer
- Penasee Globe - Hopkins
- The Daily Mining Gazette - Houghton
- Michigan Tech Lode - Houghton Michigan Technological University
- Houghton Lake Resorter - Houghton Lake
- Roscommon County Herald-News - Houghton Lake
- Livingston County Daily Press & Argus - Howell
- Hudson Post-Gazette - Hudson
- Grand Valley Advance - Hudsonville
- Woodward Talk - Huntington Woods
- Tri-City Times - Imlay City
- Tri-City Record - Coloma, Hartford, Watervliet
- Straitsland Resorter - Indian River
- Inkster Ledger Star - Inkster
- The Eagle - Inkster
- Ionia Sentinel-Standard - Ionia
- The Daily News - Iron Mountain
- The Iron County Reporter - Iron River
- Ironwood Daily Globe - Ironwood
- Gratiot County Herald - Iathaca
- Jackson Citizen Patriot - Jackson
- Grand Valley Advance - Jenison
- Community Voices Magazine - Kalamazoo
- Kalamazoo Gazette - Kalamazoo
- The Kalkaskian - Kalkaska
- West Bloomfield Beacon - Keego Harbor
- Southeast Advance - Kentwood
- The Daily News (Kingsford) - Kingsford
- L'Anse Sentinel - L'Anse
- The North Independent - Laingsburg
- The Missaukee Sentinel - Lake City
- Leelanau Enterprise - Lake Leelanau
- Lakewood News - Lake Odessa
- The Lake Orion Review - Lake Orion
- Lakeview Area News - Lakeview
- City Pulse - Lansing
- Lansing State Journal - Lansing
- The Lookout (newspaper) - Lansing Community College
- County Press, formerly Lapeer County Press - Lapeer
- Lapeer Area View - Lapeer
- Southfield Sun - Lathrup Village
- The Leelanau Enterprise - Leland
- The South Independent - Lennon
- Livingston County Daily Press & Argus - Livingston County
- Between The Lines - Livonia
- Lowell Ledger - Lowell
- Ludington Daily News - Ludington
- Mackinac Island Town Crier - Mackinac Island
- The Macomb Daily - Macomb
- Macomb Chronicle - Macomb Township
- Italian Tribune-La Tribuna del Popolo - Macomb
- Madison-Park News - Madison Heights
- Manchester Enterprise - Manchester
- Manchester Mirror - Manchester
- Michigan Advance
- News Advocate - Manistee
- Pioneer-Tribune - Manistique
- The Marion Press - Marion
- The Marlette Leader - Marlette
- The Mining Journal - Marquette
- Northern Michigan University North Wind - Marquette
- Ad-visor & Chronicle - Marshall
- Michigan Tech Lode - Michigan Technological University
- The Sun & News - Middleville
- Central Michigan Jewish Press - Midland
- Midland Daily News - Midland
- Michigan Capitol Confidential - Midland
- Milan News - Milan
- The Milan Eagle - Milan
- Milford Times - Milford
- Minden City Herald - Minden City
- Monroe Business Journal - Monroe
- Monroe Evening News - Monroe
- Monroe Guardian - Monroe
- Monroe News - Monroe
- The Agora - Monroe County Community College
- Montmorency County Tribune - Montmorency County
- Morenci Observer - Morenci
- State Line Observer - Morenci
- The Macomb Daily - Mount Clemens
- Mount Clemens-Clinton-Harrison Journal - Mount Clemens
- Mount Morris/Clio Herald - Mount Morris
- Morning Sun - Mount Pleasant
- Munising News - Munising
- Muskegon Chronicle - Muskegon
- Norton-Lakeshore Examiner - Muskegon
- The Bay Window - Muskegon Community College
- Maple Valley News - Nashville
- The Voice - New Baltimore
- Harbor Country News - New Buffalo
- New Buffalo Times - New Buffalo
- Newberry News - Newberry
- The North Independent - New Lothrop
- Daily Star - Niles
- Northville Record - Northville
- The Eagle - Northville
- The Current - Norway
- Michigan Lawyers Weekly - Novi
- Novi News - Novi
- Rochester Post - Oakland Township
- The Oakland Post - Oakland University
- The Echo - Olivet College
- The Onaway Outlook - Onaway
- The Ontonogan Herald - Ontonogan
- West Bloomfield Beacon - Orchard Lake
- The Citizen - Ortonville
- Oscoda Press - Oscoda
- The Union Enterprise - Otsego
- Argus-Press - Owosso
- Independent Newsgroup - Owosso
- The North Independent - Owosso
- Oxford Leader - Oxford
- The Courier-Leader - Paw Paw
- The South Independent - Perry
- Petoskey News-Review - Petoskey
- Pinconning Journal - Pinconning
- Cadence Newspaper - Plainfield
- The Union Enterprise - Plainwell
- Woodward Talk - Pleasant Ridge
- Plymouth Observer - Plymouth
- The Eagle - Plymouth
- The Oakland Press - Pontiac
- Port Austin Times - Port Austin
- The Times Herald - Port Huron
- Portland Review & Observer - Portland
- Herald-Review (Reed City) - Reed City
- Redford Neighborhood Connection - Redford
- Redford Observer - Redford
- Richland Express - Richland
- Rochester & Rochester Hills Gazette - Rochester Hills
- Rochester Post - Rochester and Rochester Hills
- Northeast Advance (ceased publication in 2019) - Rockford
- Rockford Squire - Rockford
- Presque Isle County Advance - Rogers City
- Presque Isle County Advance (and Onaway Outlook) - Rogers City
- The Romeo Observer - Romeo
- Detroit Metropolitan Airport News - Romulus
- Huron River Weekly - Romulus
- Romulus Roman - Romulus
- The Eagle - Romulus
- Roscommon Roscommon County Voice
- Houghton Lake Resorter & Roscommon County Herald-News - Roscommon
- Gazette van Detroit - Roseville
- Roseville-Eastpointe Eastsider - Roseville
- Daily Tribune - Royal Oak
- Royal Oak Review - Royal Oak
- The Saginaw News - Saginaw
- The Township View - Saginaw
- The Valley Vanguard - Saginaw Valley State University
- Saline Reporter - Saline
- Sanilac County News - Sandusky
- Sandusky Tribune & Deckerville Recorder & Marlette Leader - Sandusky
- Sanilac County Jeffersonian - Sandusky
- The Commercial Record - Saugatuck
- The Evening News - Sault Sainte Marie
- South County News - Schoolcraft
- The Connection - Schoolcraft College
- Newsweekly - Sebewaing
- The South Independent - Shaftsburg
- Shelby-Utica News - Shelby
- The Southwester - Southwestern Michigan College
- Erie Square Gazette - St. Clair County Community College
- St. Clair Shores Sentinel - St. Clair Shores
- The St. Ignace News - St. Ignace
- The Herald-Palladium - St. Joseph
- Trade Lines - St. Joseph
- South Lyon Herald - South Lyon
- The Jewish News - Southfield
- Southfield Sun - Southfield
- The Heritage Sunday - Southgate
- The News-Herald - Southgate
- South Haven Tribune - South Haven
- Northwest Advance - Sparta
- Springport Signal - Springport
- Menominee County Journal - Stephenson
- Sterling Heights Sentry - Sterling Heights
- Town Crier - Stockbridge
- Sturgis Journal - Sturgis
- Swartz Creek View - Swartz Creek
- West Bloomfield Beacon - Sylvan Lake
- Iosco County News-Herald - Tawas City
- Tecumseh Herald - Tecumseh
- Bedford Now - Temperance
- The South County Gazette - Three Oaks
- Three Rivers Commercial-News - Three Rivers
- Grand Traverse Business News - Traverse City
- Grand Traverse Herald - Traverse City
- Northern Express - Traverse City
- Traverse City Record-Eagle - Traverse City
- Nordamerikansiche Wochen-post - Troy
- Oakland Observer - Troy
- Troy-Somerset Gazette - Troy
- Troy Times - Troy
- Hometown Gazette - Union City
- The Varsity News - University of Detroit Mercy
- The Michigan Daily - University of Michigan
- Source/Advisor Newspaper - Utica
- Shelby-Utica News - Utica
- Vanderbiltmich.com - Vanderbilt
- Pioneer Times - Vassar
- The South Independent - Vernon
- South County News - Vicksburg
- Grand Valley Advance - Walker
- Northwest Advance - Walker
- Warren Weekly - Warren
- Washtenaw Voice - Washtenaw Community College
- Spinal Column Newsweekly - Waterford
- Penasee Globe - Wayland
- Journal Newspaper - Wayne
- The South End - Wayne State University
- West Bloomfield Beacon - West Bloomfield
- Northwest Advance - West Grand Rapids
- Westland Observer - Westland
- White Lake Beacon - Whitehall
- Williamston Enterprise - Williamston
- El Informador - Wyoming, Michigan
- Southwest Advance - Wyoming
- The Yale Expositor - Yale
- Ypsilanti Courier - Ypsilanti
- Zeeland Record - Zeeland

== Defunct ==
- The Alcona County Herald, a/k/a The Lincolln Herald Lincoln The Lincoln Herald began publishing on Jan. 1, 1908 by D.C. Magahay. On Mar. 10, 1910 it changed names to Alcona County Herald with Rola E. Prescott as publisher. “It is the only country weekly in the United States having its own cartoonist and giving its readers a live cartoon on county subjects in every issue.” Lincoln Herald: The newspaper began publishing on January 1, 1908, under the name Lincoln Herald. It was founded by D.C. Magahay. Alcona County Herald: On March 10, 1910, the newspaper changed its name to the Alcona County Herald, with Rola E. Prescott as the publisher. Interestingly, it was the only country weekly in the United States to have its own cartoonist, providing readers with lively cartoons on county subjects in every issue. While its print edition is history, it has been transmuted into a digital-only format.
- The Bay City Journal, Bay City, Michigan
- Birmingham, Eccentric, Birmingham – circulation was just in excess of 6,000. It ceased print publication in December 2022.
- Bronson Journal, Bronson ceased publication on Nov. 16, 2017.
- Copper Island News, Hancock
- Copper Island Sentinel, Calumet
- Daily Chronicle, Marshall (1879–1907)
- The Dearborn Independent (1919–27)
- Detroit Sunday Journal
- Detroiter Abend-Post, Detroit and Warren (1868–1980)
- Detroit Times (1900–1960)
- Die Familienblätter (1866–1868) Detroit
- The Flint Flashes, Flint
- The Grand Traverse Herald, Traverse City
- The Herald Press, St. Joseph
- The Hillsdale Standard, Hillsdale
- Hillsdale Whig Standard, Hillsdale
- Lincoln Herald, Lincoln, 1908 - 1910.
- The Livonia Observer, Livonia, ceased printing in December 2022, but an online edition persists. That paper had an circulation of over 14,000. The Livonia Observer one of six Gannett papers that lost their physical editions. The Plymouth Voice stated that "the publisher said publications will continue online and there were no new layoffs associated with the print finale. Currently are only five reporters to cover the communities that number about one million people. Gannett said they will maintain print editions in Northville, Novi, Milford and South Lyon."
- Iosco County Gazette Index, Iosco County
- Iron Ore, Ishpeming (1886–1951; Weekly Agitator and Ishpeming Iron Agitator; merged with Ishpeming Reflector)
- Mason County Record, Ludington
- Metro Community Newspapers, Livonia
- Michigan Journal (1854–1868) Detroit "the first German newspaper in Detroit, that was founded in 1854 by two brothers: August and Conrad Marxhausen."
- The Michigan Tradesman, Petoskey
- The Nordamerikanische Wochen Post (1980–2022) Warren
- The Owosso Independent, Durand (1968–2024)
- Saginaw Daily Journal, Saginaw
- St Joseph Herald, Saint Joseph
- St Joseph Traveler Herald, Saint Joseph
- The Weekly Press, Saint Joseph

=== See also ===
- Michigan Woman's Press Association

== See also ==
- Media in Detroit
- Media in Grand Rapids, Michigan

Comprehensive

- Lists of newspapers
- List of newspapers in the United States

Frequency

- List of free daily newspapers in the United States
- List of weekly newspapers in the United States

Circulation

- List of international newspapers originating in the United States
- List of national newspapers in the United States
- List of newspapers in the United States by circulation

Foreign language

- List of French-language newspapers published in the United States
- List of German-language newspapers published in the United States
- List of Spanish-language newspapers published in the United States

Specialty

- List of African-American newspapers in the United States
- List of alternative weekly newspapers in the United States
- List of business newspapers in the United States
- List of family-owned newspapers in the United States
- List of Jewish newspapers in the United States
- List of LGBTQ periodicals in the United States
- List of student newspapers in the United States
- List of supermarket tabloids in the United States
- List of underground press in the United States

Other

- List of defunct newspapers of the United States
