= Capital News Service (Michigan) =

Wire service

- Company type: Wire service
- Founded: Fall 1981
- Headquarters: East Lansing, Michigan, United States
- Key people: Eric Freedman
- Owners: Michigan State University
- Website: news.jrn.msu.edu/series/capitalnewsservice/

The Capital News Service (CNS) is a wire service based at Michigan State University in East Lansing, Michigan. CNS covers news at the state capital in Lansing and across Michigan for member papers from September to early May. The circulation of the combined member papers is one of the largest in the state—larger than the Detroit Free Press. The service is headed by Eric Freedman, a Pulitzer-winning reporter formerly of The Detroit News. Correspondents are selected from undergraduate and master's students within the School of Journalism and College of Communication Arts and Sciences by an application process. During each semester, correspondents report on state government, politics and public policy for daily and weekly newspapers and online news outlets across Michigan.

Articles on topics ranging from prison reform and education budgeting to environmental issues. Story ideas for these articles and the shorter weekly pieces are gathered from individual research, as well as weekly newsmakers sessions. These unofficial “press conferences” feature speakers from different state government departments and policy groups. Past conference speakers have included the Department of Health and Human Services, the Michigan United Conservation Clubs and the Michigan League for Public Policy, among others.

== History ==
CNS was founded in 1981 by Michigan Journalism Hall of Fame member Dick Milliman, formerly of the Milliman Newspaper Group. The course, created as part of the MSU School of Journalism, was originally called the MSU Capitol News Bureau. It emphasized writing for publication and focused on less glamorous breaking news that could be localized. The pilot program, taught by Milliman, was made up of 10 students and 10 subscribing newspapers. Since 1981, the wire service has expanded its reach to nearly 40 publications. After Milliman’s work, Bill Cote, formerly of Booth Newspapers, was named coordinator. Cote became a member of the School of Journalism faculty in 1986. Following Cote’s retirement, Professor Eric Freedman, a Pulitzer Prize-winning reporter for the Detroit News, became CNS director. Freedman currently heads the program and teaches it alongside David Poulson, the senior associate director of MSU’s Knight Center for Environmental Journalism.

== Publications ==
CNS currently works with publications including:

=== Print ===
- Alcona County Review
- Bay Mills News
- Benzie County Record Patriot
- Big Rapids Pioneer
- Blissfield Advance
- Cadillac News
- Cheboygan Daily Tribune
- Clare County Cleaver
- Coldwater Daily Reporter
- Corp! Magazine (Warren)
- Crawford County Avalanche
- Fowlerville News & Views
- Grand Rapids Business Journal
- (Greenville) Daily News
- Harbor Light (Harbor Springs)
- Herald Review (Big Rapids)
- Hillsdale Daily News
- Holland Sentinel
- Ionia Sentinel-Standard
- Lake County Star (Big Rapids)
- Lansing City Pulse
- Leelanau Enterprise
- Ludington Daily News
- Manistee News Advocate
- Michigan Farm News (Lansing)
- The Mining Journal (Marquette)
- Montmorency County Tribune
- Oceana Herald Journal
- Petoskey News Review
- Sault Ste. Marie Evening News
- St. Ignace News
- Sturgis Journal
- Three Rivers Commercial-News
- Traverse City Record-Eagle

=== Radio ===
- WKAR Radio

=== Internet ===
- Great Lakes Echo
- Gongwer News Service
- Michigan Information and Research Service (MIRS)
