= Mirella Freni =

Italian soprano (1935–2020)

Mirella Freni OMRI
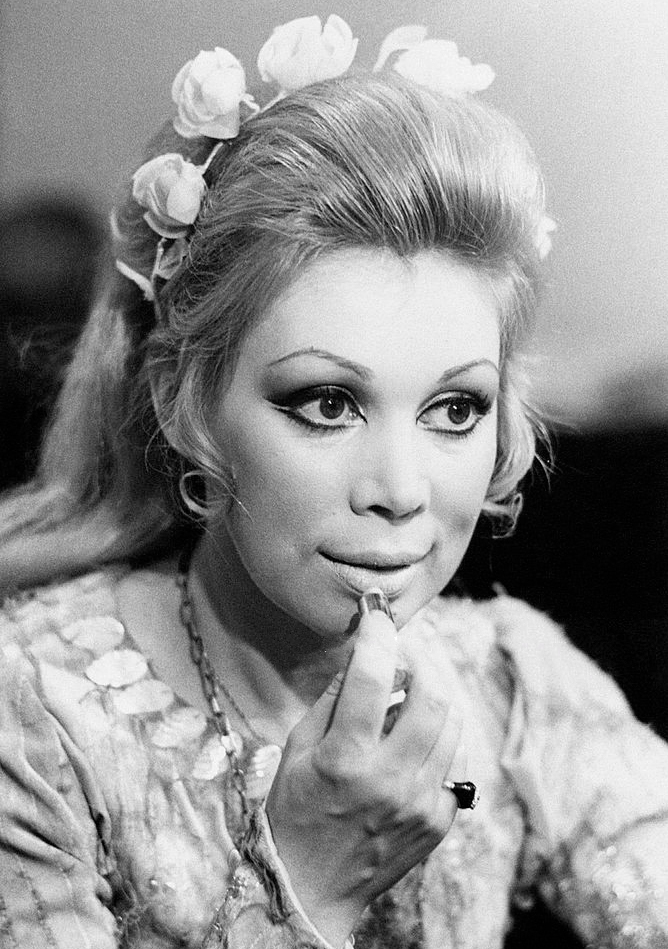
- Freni in 1970
- Born: Mirella Fregni; 27 February 1935; Modena, Kingdom of Italy
- Died: 9 February 2020 (aged 84); Modena, Italy
- Occupation: Operatic soprano
- Years active: 1955–2005
- Spouses: Leone Magiera (m. 1955; div. 1978); Nicolai Ghiaurov (m. 1978; died 2004)
- Children: 1
- Awards: Order of Merit of the Italian Republic; Legion of Honour; Ordre des Arts et des Lettres

Mirella Freni (Note: Italian pronunciation: [miˈrɛlla ˈfreːni].) OMRI (born Mirella Fregni; (Note: Italian pronunciation: [miˈrɛlla ˈfreɲɲi].) 27 February 1935 – 9 February 2020) was an Italian operatic soprano who had a career of 50 years and appeared at major international opera houses. She received international attention at the Glyndebourne Festival, where she appeared in Mozart roles as Zerlina in Don Giovanni and Susanna in Le nozze di Figaro, and as Adina in Donizetti's L'elisir d'amore.

Freni is associated with the role of Mimì in Puccini's La bohème, which featured in her repertoire from 1957 to 1999 and which she sang at La Scala in Milan and the Vienna State Opera in 1963, conducted by Herbert von Karajan. She also performed the role in a film of the production and as her debut at the Metropolitan Opera in New York City in 1965. In the earliest opera DVDs, she portrayed her characters convincingly in both acting and singing. Freni was married to the Bulgarian bass Nicolai Ghiaurov, with whom she performed and recorded. Her obituary from The New York Times described her as a "matchless Italian prima donna".

== Life ==
=== Biography ===
Born in Modena, she had the same wet nurse as Luciano Pavarotti, with whom she grew up and who was to become a frequent tenor partner on stage. She studied voice first with her uncle, Dante Arcelli, then with Luigi Bertazzoni and Ettore Campogalliani. She later changed the spelling of her name from Fregni to Freni, thinking it would make it easier to pronounce. Freni made her operatic debut at the Teatro Municipale in her hometown on 3 March 1955 as Micaëla in Bizet's Carmen. She later married her teacher, the pianist and director Leone Magiera, and had a daughter with him. She resumed her career in 1958 when she performed Mimì in Puccini's La bohème at the Teatro Regio in Turin and sang in De Nederlandse Opera's 1959–60 season. Her international breakthrough came at the Glyndebourne Festival, where she appeared in 1960 as Zerlina in Mozart's Don Giovanni alongside Joan Sutherland as Donna Anna, and in 1962 as Susanna in Mozart's Le nozze di Figaro and as Adina in Donizetti's L'elisir d'amore, directed by Franco Zeffirelli.

In 1961, Freni first performed at the Royal Opera House in London as Nannetta in Verdi's Falstaff. She stepped in as Nannetta at La Scala in Milan for Renata Scotto in 1962. On 31 January 1963, she appeared there as Mimì in a production staged by Franco Zeffirelli and conducted by Herbert von Karajan. She became one of the conductor's favourite singers in operas and concerts. The production was repeated at the Vienna State Opera the same year, and she appeared at the house in eleven roles, including the title role of Puccini's Manon Lescaut and Amelia in Verdi's Simon Boccanegra. On 29 September 1965, she first appeared at the Metropolitan Opera in New York City, again as Mimì, with Gianni Raimondi as Rodolfo who also made his house debut. Reviewer Alan Rich wrote in the New York Herald Tribune:

Miss Freni is—well, "irresistible" will do for a start. Beautiful to look at, and actress of simple naturalness and overwhelming intelligence, she used voice and gesture to create a Mimì of ravishing femininity and grace. The voice itself is pure and fresh, operating without seam from bottom to top, marvelously colored at every point by what seems to be an instinctive response to the urging of the text.

She later appeared there as Adina in Donizetti's L'elisir d'amore, Liù in Puccini's Turandot, Marguerite in Gounod's Faust, and Juliette in Roméo et Juliette. The following year she sang Mimì again for her Philadelphia Lyric Opera Company debut, with Flaviano Labò as Rodolfo. She appeared as Maria in Donizetti's La figlia del reggimento first at La Scala in 1968, also the first time she performed together with Pavarotti. The following year they performed as the lovers Mimi and Rudolfo in La bohème there together. A recording of her singing Mimi with Pavarotti as Rudolfo conducted by Karajan was released in 1973.

From the early 1970s into the 1980s, Freni sang heavier Verdi roles, including Elisabetta in John Dexter's production of Don Carlos, Desdemona in Otello (alongside Jon Vickers), Amelia in Simon Boccanegra, Elvira in the Luca Ronconi staging of Ernani, Leonora in La forza del destino, and the title role of Aida performed in the Houston Grand Opera in 1987. She appeared as Puccini's Tosca only on a recording. She performed as Manon Lescaut in the Metropolitan Opera's 1990 season and recorded Madama Butterfly and the three roles of Il trittico.

Freni chose her roles carefully, saying in an interview: "I am generous in many ways, but not when I think it will destroy my voice. Some singers think they are gods who can do everything. But I have always been honest with myself and my possibilities." She refused Karajan's offers of Leonora in Verdi's Il trovatore and the title role in Puccini's Turandot. Elvira in Ernani was set aside after a single run at La Scala (and despite offers to sing the role elsewhere). She never sang Cio-Cio-San on stage, but recorded it twice, not including the 1975 film Madama Butterfly, alongside Plácido Domingo, with Karajan conducting and Jean-Pierre Ponnelle directing. She was asked by Karajan several times to perform Cio-Cio-San at La Scala and Salzburg, but she refused on the basis of the role being far too heavy and constraining on her voice, especially for several consecutive nights. (Note: From an interview, featured as one of a series of bonus tracks in the 2009 reissue of Herbert von Karajan's 1973 recording of La bohème.) She played Susanna in the Ponnelle film of Le nozze di Figaro, which also featured Dietrich Fischer-Dieskau, Kiri Te Kanawa and Hermann Prey.

Freni extended her repertoire and style during the 1990s with Italian verismo, taking on the title roles of Francesco Cilea's Adriana Lecouvreur in Milan, Paris, Barcelona and New York, and Umberto Giordano's Fedora in London, Milan, New York, Turin, Barcelona and Zürich. In 1997, she performed Giordano's Madame Sans-Gêne at the Teatro Massimo Bellini. During this time she sang in Russian operas, such as Tchaikovsky's Tatiana in Eugene Onegin, Lisa in The Queen of Spades, and Ioanna in The Maid of Orleans. Freni ended her professional career on stage, performing teenager Ioanna at the age of 70 at the Washington National Opera on 11 April 2005.

=== Personal life ===
Freni's marriage to Leone Magiera in 1955 resulted in their daughter Micaela but ended in divorce in 1978. She then married Nicolai Ghiaurov, one of the leading operatic basses of the post-war period. Together they helped to establish the Centro Universale del Bel Canto in Vignola, where they began giving master classes in 2002. After Ghiaurov's death in 2004, Freni continued their work of preserving the bel canto tradition, teaching young singers from around the world. Freni's daughter, Micaela Magiera, wrote a biographical work by the name of The Girl Under the Piano, which centers on her parents and their friendship with Pavarotti. (Note: "Among the recognitions received, Micaela Magiera won the award of the criticism at the literary contest "Milano International" and she was also a finalist for the Carver Award.")

Freni died on 9 February 2020 at her home in Modena. According to her manager, she died "after a long degenerative illness and a series of strokes". She left her sister, Marta Fregni, her daughter and two grandchildren. On 12 February, her coffin was moved from the funeral home to the Teatro Comunale Modena for public tribute and then transferred in a procession to Modena Cathedral, where the funeral took place. The Italian Tribune of Detroit eulogized her life and career:

[Freni was] an exemplary operatic prima donna for nearly 50 years, she was known for her beguiling stage presence and quiet charisma. She first won international acclaim in 1963, singing the role of Mimì in the Franco Zeffirelli production of Puccini's La Bohème at La Scala in Milan. In later years, Ms. Freni enjoyed teaching at the University of Bologna and also established a separate center for the study of singing in the town of Vignola.

== Honours ==
Freni was awarded the Order of Merit of the Italian Republic in the grade of Knight Grand Cross in 1990 and the French Legion of Honour in March 1993. In 1995, she was appointed Commander of the Ordre des Arts et des Lettres. The University of Pisa awarded her an honorary degree in 2002 for her "great contribution to European culture." In 2009, she was promoted to the rank of Officer in the Legion of Honour. In a broadcast matinée of Fedora at the Metropolitan Opera on 26 April 1997, Freni was presented with the Key to the City of New York by then mayor, Rudy Giuliani. In 2005, the Metropolitan Opera celebrated the 40th anniversary of her Met debut and her 50th anniversary on stage with a special gala concert conducted by James Levine.

== Videography ==
- The Metropolitan Opera Centennial Gala (1983), Deutsche Grammophon DVD, 00440-073-4538, 2009
- The Metropolitan Opera Gala 1991, Deutsche Grammophon DVD, 00440-073-4582, 2010
