= Capital News Service =

Capital News Service or Capitol News Service may refer to:

- Capital News Service (Maryland), a wire service based at the University of Maryland in College Park, Maryland
- Capital News Service (Michigan), a wire service based at Michigan State University in East Lansing, Michigan
- Capital News Service, a wire service based at Virginia Commonwealth University in Richmond, Virginia
- Capitol News Service, a television news service based in Tallahassee, Florida
- Capitol News Service, a news service in Sacramento, California owned by the Metropolitan News Company
