= 2006 Michigan Proposal 06-3 =

Proposal 06-3
- November 7, 2006
- A referendum on Act 160 of 2004, an act to allow the establishment of a hunting season for mourning doves

Results
Choice	Votes	%
Yes	1,137,379	30.97%
No	2,534,680	69.03%
Total votes	3,672,059	100.00%

Michigan Proposal 06-3 was rejected by Michigan voters on November 7, 2006. The state ballot initiative, if approved, would have upheld a 2004 act legalizing the hunting of mourning doves.

Mourning dove hunting was banned in Michigan in 1905. A bill to reverse ban was introduced by State Rep. Susan Tabor in 2003. The bill was signed into law by Governor Jennifer Granholm in 2004. Animal rights groups collected and submitted enough signatures to initiate a referendum challenging the act, Proposal 06–3. The rejection of the referendum invalidated the 2004 law, and reinstated the mourning dove hunting ban.

Michigan remains the only Midwestern state to ban mourning dove hunting.

== Ballot language ==
The following was the language of the proposal on the ballot, as reported by The St. Ignace News:

A REFERENDUM ON PUBLIC ACT 160 OF 2004 – AN ACT TO ALLOW THE ESTABLISHMENT OF A HUNTING SEASON FOR MOURNING DOVES

Public Act 160 of 2004 would:

- Authorize the Natural Resources Commission to establish a hunting season for mourning doves.
- Require a mourning dove hunter to have a small game license and a $2.00 mourning dove stamp.
- Stipulate that revenue from the stamp must be split evenly between the Game and Fish Protection Fund and the Fish and Wildlife Trust Fund.
- Require the Department of Natural Resources to address responsible mourning dove hunting; management practices for the propagation of mourning doves; and participate in mourning dove hunting by youth, the elderly and the disabled in the Department's annual hunting guide.

Should this law be approved?

== Background ==
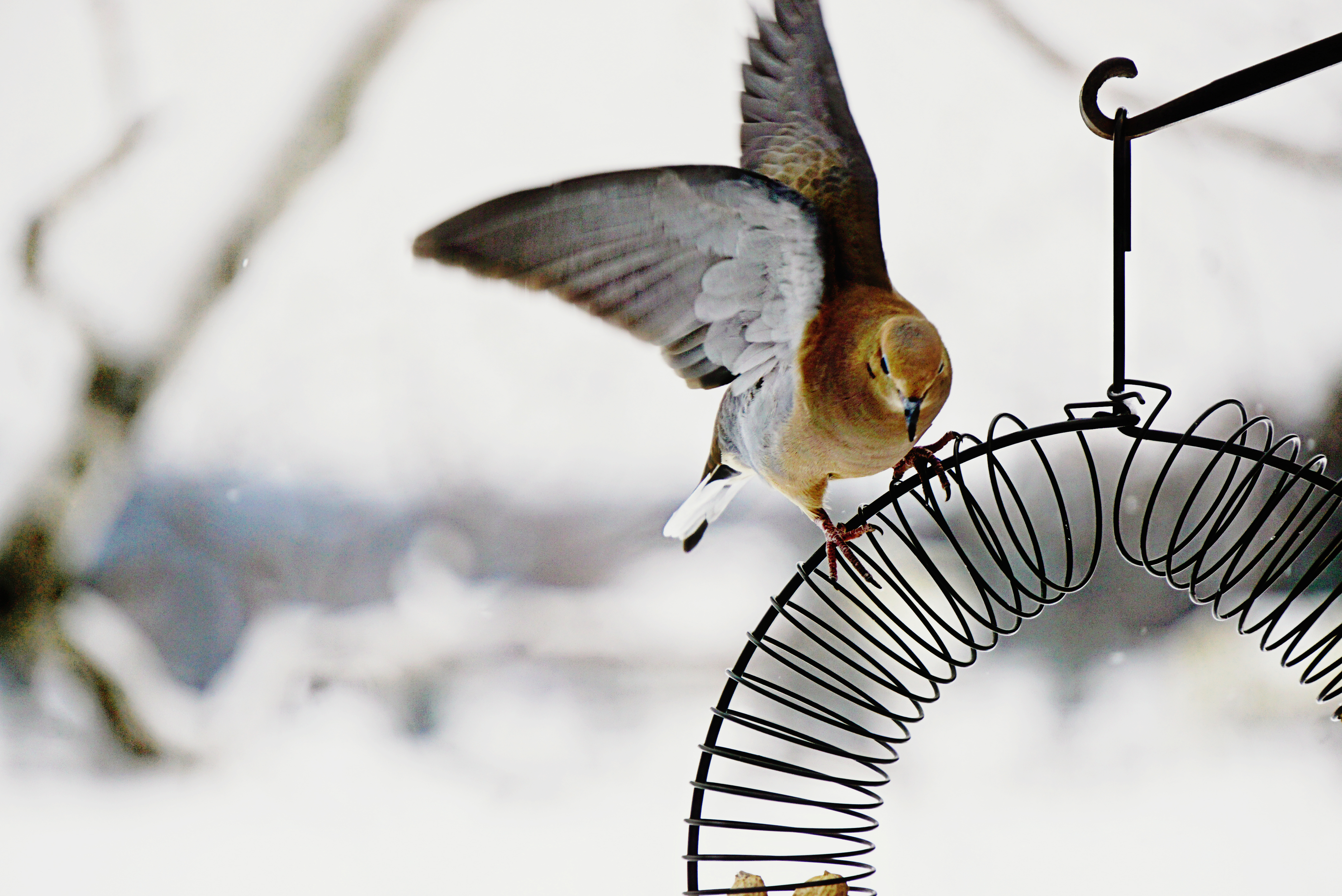
Mourning doves are one of the most populous birds in North America

The mourning dove is one of the most populous birds in North America. By 2006, there was an estimated 400 million mourning doves in the continent, with around 4 million migrating in Michigan in the fall.

The Migratory Bird Treaty Act of 1918 allows for states to manage the hunting of mourning doves within federal guidelines. The United States Fish and Wildlife Service estimated that 6% of the mourning dove population, 22.7 million birds, were harvested by hunters in the U.S. in 2005. By 2006, 40 states in the Union had legalized the hunting of mourning doves. Ohio, a state neighboring Michigan, legalized mourning dove hunting in 1994. Other nearby states, Wisconsin and Minnesota, had legalized the practice in 2000 and 2004 respectively.

Animal rights and welfare groups stood in favor of a mourning dove hunting ban in Michigan. These included included the Michigan Audubon Society, the Humane Society of the United States, and the American Society for the Prevention of Cruelty to Animals. The groups stood by the mourning doves' classification as a songbird, not a game bird. They argued against the hunting of mourning doves on the grounds that there was no need, as the doves were not overabundant nor were they a nuisance to farmers. They also argued that the doves' small size made them a poor game bird for meat. Further, they claimed that mourning doves were often used as target practice, and were left unretrieved by hunters. Unretrieved birds with lead shot inside them, they argued, would be an environmental hazard. They also claimed that protected species were often mistaken for mourning doves by hunters.

Hunting and firearms groups stood opposed to a mourning dove hunting ban. These included the National Rifle Association (NRA), the U.S. Sportsmen's Alliance, and the Michigan United Conservation Clubs. These groups claimed that hunting mourning doves would have a negligible impact on their population. They also used the widespread legalization as argument for implementing it in Michigan. They objected to the opposition's argument that mourning doves are often used as target practice, explaining that doves are very often eaten by those that hunt them. Hunting organizations argued that banning the hunting of mourning doves was an infringement on hunters' rights, and that the ban was threat to the practice of hunting as a whole.

== Polling ==
Poll source	Date(s) administered	Sample size (Note: Key: RV – registered voters LV – likely voters)	Margin of error	Anti-dove hunting	Pro-dove hunting	Undecided
EPIC/MRA	December 6–10, 2000	600 (RV)	± 4%	52%	32%	-
EPIC/MRA	February 22–25, 2004	600 (LV)	± 4%	51%	30%	19%
EPIC/MRA	June 29–July 7, 2005	1,000 (RV)	± 3%	40%	42%	18%
EPIC/MRA	August 2–9, 2005	600 (LV)	± 4%	60%	32%	8%
Selzer & Co. Inc.	August 28–30, 2006	803 (LV)	± 3.5%	50%	40%	10%

== Legislation ==
Mourning dove hunting was initially banned in Michigan in 1905, by an act of the state legislature.

By May 1985, pressure from hunters had caused the Michigan Natural Resources Commission (NRC) to consider the establishment of a mourning dove hunting season. On July 12, 1985, the NRC voted unanimously to establish an experimental dove season in Southern Michigan, from September 15 to October 6. The move was opposed by the Michigan Audubon Society. On August 2, the Michigan Humane Society filed a lawsuit against the NRC, in an attempt to block the hunting season. Ingham County circuit court ordered a preliminary injunction to prevent the hunting season on August 20. The injunction was upheld by the Michigan Court of Appeals. The circuit court ordered a permanent injunction against the hunting season on September 25, ruling that only the state legislature had the authority to establish a dove hunting season. The Court of Appeals upheld the ruling on March 4, 1987.

In May 1995, Republican state senator Phil Hoffman introduced a bill which would establish a mourning dove hunting season. On May 18, the bill passed through the Senate Natural Resources and Environmental Affairs Committee unanimously. On May 25, the bill passed through the Michigan Senate, with a 21–15 vote, one vote over what was necessary. The bill was then referred to the House Conservation, Environment, and Great Lakes Committee. There, on September 22, committee chairman Republican Mick Middaugh announced that he had chosen not to let the bill out of committee, preventing progress on the bill.

=== Susan Tabor's mourning dove bills ===
On November 14, 2000, Susan Tabor, a Republican state representative from the Lansing area, introduced a bill to allow the hunting of mourning doves. Tabor hoped that a mourning dove hunting season could combat the decline in youth hunting, due to the abundance of the bird. As per the bill, dove season would begin on June 1, 2001. It advanced through the House Committee on Conservation and Outdoor Recreation. The bill passed through the Michigan House of Representatives on November 28, with a 56–45 vote. On December 14, the bill failed in the state Senate, with a 19–15 vote. It was one vote short of the 20 votes necessary.

By October 2001, Tabor had started a letter campaign to gauge interest in reintroducing the bill. The Songbird Protection Coalition, a group formed to oppose Tabor's initial bill, started an opposing letter campaign.

On August 13, 2003, Rep. Tabor introduced a bill to designate the mourning dove as a game bird. She was then chair of the House Committee on Conservation and Outdoor Recreation. Term limits prevented her from running for re-election again, and she described passing the bill as a high priority. In September, Tabor, in collaboration with the U.S. Sportsmen's Alliance and Ohio Division of Wildlife, hosted a mourning dove hunt in the Pickerel Creek Wildlife Area near Toledo, Ohio, to promote her bill. It was attended by six state legislators, as well as media figures. The bill passed through committee on October 29. There was a pro-dove hunting rally held at the State Capitol on November 4, the day the state House voted on the bill. There were 400 in attendance, and speakers at the rally included rock musician Ted Nugent, NRA President Kayne Robinson, and Michigan House Speaker Rick Johnson. The state House passed the bill, with a vote of 64–44. They also approved an amendment to the bill, allowing the Michigan Department of Natural Resources to use $350,000 to make brochures about dove hunting. This made the bill involve appropriations, and therefore unable to be overturned by a referendum.

A hearing by the Senate Appropriations Committee on the dove hunting bill initially set for February 5, 2004, was cancelled without a stated reason. The bill was then transferred from the Appropriations Committee to the Judiciary Committee. In a hearing on February 17, the Judiciary Committee attempted to approve a new version of the bill and move it to another committee. This proposed new version got rid of the brochure appropriations in the bill. It was replaced with a requirement that dove hunters pay a $2 mourning dove stamp fee. It also required the annual hunting guide to include information on how to tell mourning doves apart from protected species. The committee deadlocked 3–3 on whether or not to revise the bill and move it to another committee. One committee member, Republican Bruce Patterson, refused to vote, feeling the bill was in the wrong committee. Senate leaders would later decide to keep the bill in the Judiciary Committee. On March 30, the new version of the bill passed through the Judiciary Committee with a 4–3 vote, along party lines. The four Republicans on the committee voted in favor of the bill, while the three Democrats voted against it.

The bill passed through the state Senate on March 31 with a 22–15 vote. Only two Republicans opposed it, and five Democrats voted in favor of it. The state House gave a concurring vote to the Senate version, again passing the bill on June 8. The state House vote was 65–40. There were 55 Republicans and 10 Democrats in favor of the bill, with 33 Democrats and 7 Republicans against the bill.

Initially, Democratic Governor Jennifer Granholm said that she would veto the bill, stating the issue should be put up to a public vote. By June 8, she was more supportive of the bill. She had corresponded with chair of the NRC, Keith Charters. The bill gave the NRC the authority to establish the hunting season for mourning doves. Charters explained that the NRC planned to initially do a limited, experimental season. This satisfied Granholm, who signed the bill into law on June 18.

On September 9, the NRC unanimously approved a mourning dove hunting season in Michigan. The season would be limited to six southern counties: Berrien, Branch, Cass, Hilldale, Lenawee, and St. Joseph. It lasted from September 10 to October 30. Hunters were limited to harvesting 15 doves a day, and were only allowed to have 30 in their possession at any given time. For the 2004 season, according to the Michigan Department of Natural Resources, 4,981 hunters bought dove stamps. Of those hunters, 3,068 hunted mourning doves. A total of 28,139 mourning doves were killed. They estimated that of those killed, 4,000 birds were unable to be retrieved. The trial season was supposed to last three years, from 2004 to 2006, but the 2005 and 2006 seasons were cancelled by the initiation of a referendum on the mourning dove hunting law.

== Referendum ==
On August 5, 2004, a campaign was announced to initiate a referendum to repeal the mourning dove hunting law, and reinstitute to the dove hunting ban. An organization called the Committee to Restore the Dove Shooting Ban formed to get the referendum on the 2006 ballot. They needed to submit 158,879 signatures by March 29, 2005.

On March 28, 2005, the group submitted 275,363 signatures. The signatures went unchallenged by opposition groups. On June 2, the Board of State Canvassers unanimously approved the petition, estimating that roughly 244,000 of the signatures were valid.

Opposition groups waited for the petition to gain enough signatures before mounting a counter campaign. The Citizens for Wildlife Conservation (CWC) formed around August 2005, in response to the success of the petition drive. It sought to protect dove hunting. The group conducted a fundraiser called the Save Our Heritage Sweepstakes. The Committee to Restore the Dove Shooting Ban filed a complaint with the Michigan Attorney General. They accused the sweepstakes of being an illegal lottery and unlawful fundraising tactic. On August 18, 2006, the office of the state attorney general, headed by Republican Mike Cox, stopped the sweepstakes and made the CWC refund the 15,000 to 25,000 tickets they distributed, but allowed the CWC to keep any of the ticket money that was voluntarily returned to the organization.

In September 2006, the Committee to Restore the Dove Shooting Ban changed their name to the Committee to Keep Doves Protected. The name change was to make it clearer the group wanted people to vote "no" on the referendum, to reinstate the dove hunting ban. On October 9, the group launched a television advertisement supporting their cause, which aired statewide.

The referendum was held on November 7, alongside the 2006 general election. It was one of five statewide ballot proposals voted on that day. The referendum, Proposal 06–3, was defeated, with 2,534,680 "no" votes and 1,137,379 "yes" votes. The rejection of the proposal invalidated the 2004 law, and revived the mourning dove hunting ban.

As of 2018, 42 states have legalized mourning dove hunting. Michigan remains the only Midwestern state where mourning dove hunting is illegal.

== See also ==
- Michigan Civil Rights Initiative, another 2006 Michigan state ballot proposal
