= Charlevoix Courier =

Newspaper of Charlevoix, Michigan

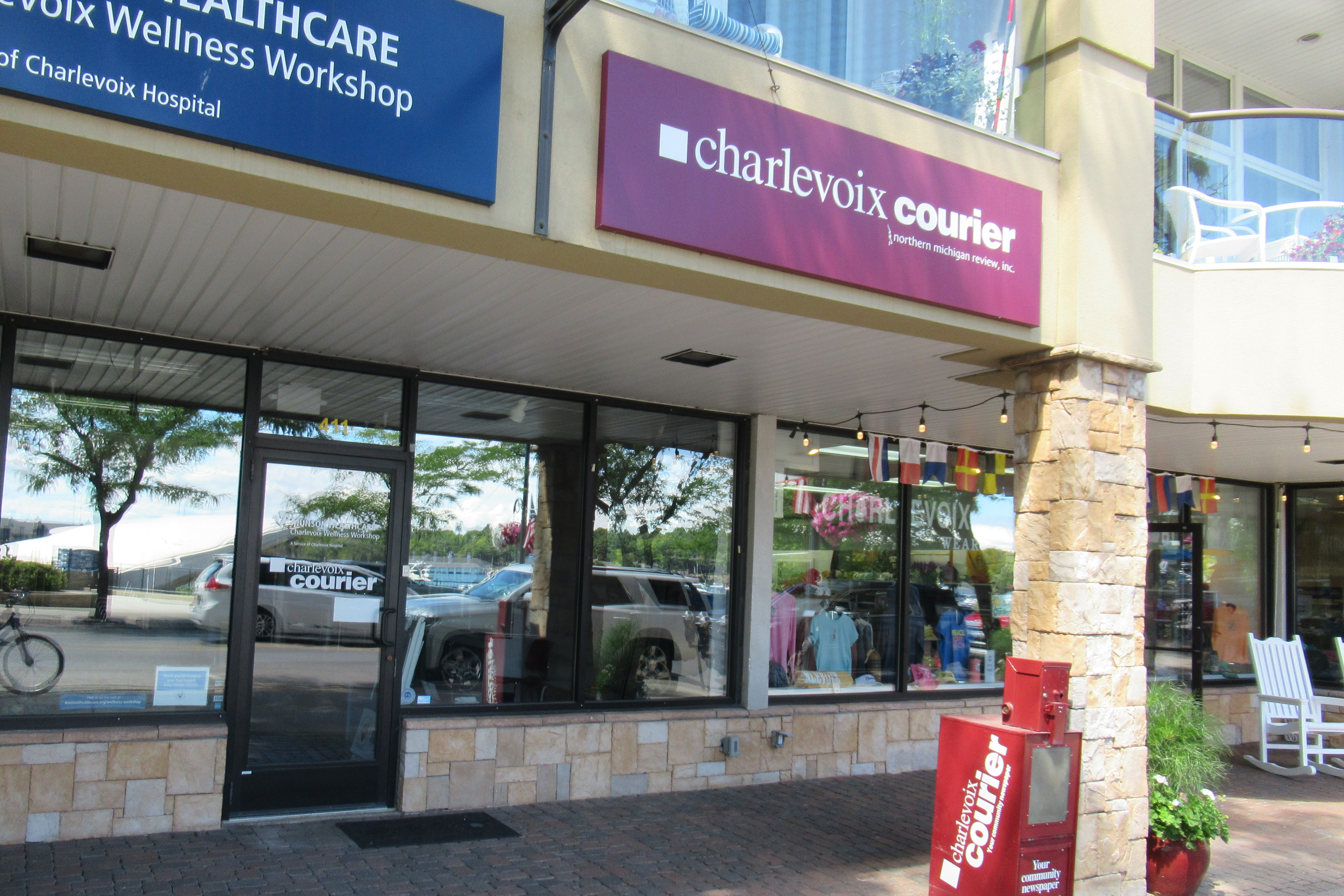
- Type: Weekly newspaper
- Owner: USA Today Co.
- Editor: Sarah Leach
- Founded: 1883
- Headquarters: 411 Bridge Street (US 31); Charlevoix, Michigan 49720
- Circulation: 660 (as of 2022)
- Website: charlevoixcourier.com

The Charlevoix Courier is the weekly newspaper of Charlevoix, Michigan. The paper publishes weekly on Fridays.

== History ==
The Charlevoix Courier was founded in 1883. In 2006, the paper, along with its sister publications the Petoskey News-Review and the Gaylord Herald Times, was purchased by Schurz Communications of South Bend, Indiana. In 2019, it was sold to GateHouse Media.
