= 2006 Michigan elections =

- November 7, 2006

The 2006 Michigan elections were held in the U.S. state of Michigan on November 7, 2006. The state primary was held on August 8.

== Federal ==
=== U.S. Senate election ===
Incumbent Democratic U.S. Senator Debbie Stabenow was re-elected, defeating Republican nominee Mike Bouchard.

=== U.S. House of Representatives election ===
There were 9 Republicans elected to the U.S. House of Representatives from Michigan, and 6 Democrats elected. This maintained the previous partisan makeup of Michigan's House delegation.

== Executive ==
=== Governor and lieutenant governor ===
Incumbent Democratic governor Jennifer Granholm was re-elected, defeating Republican nominee Dick DeVos.

=== Secretary of state ===
Incumbent Republican secretary of state Terri Lynn Land was re-elected, defeating Democratic nominee Carmella Sabaugh.

=== Attorney general ===
Incumbent Republican attorney general Mike Cox was re-elected, defeating Democratic nominee Amos Williams.

== Legislature ==
=== Senate ===
Republicans in the Michigan Senate lost one seat, but still held a 21–17 majority in the chamber over the Democrats.

=== House of Representatives ===
Democrats gained a majority in the state House, which held a Republican majority before the election. Democrats won a 58–52 majority over the Republicans.

== Judiciary ==
=== Supreme Court ===
Incumbent justices Democrat Michael Cavanagh and Republican Maura D. Corrigan were re-elected, maintaining a 5–2 Republican majority on the court.

== Michigan State Board of Education and University boards ==
=== Michigan State Board of Education ===
Democrats Casandra E. Ulbrich and incumbent Reginald Turner won, defeating nine other candidates, including incumbent Republican Eileen Weiser, raising the Democrats' majority on the board to 6–2 over the Republicans.

=== Michigan State University Board of Trustees ===
Democrats George Perles and Faylen Owens defeated incumbent Michigan State University trustees Republicans Dee Cook and Dave Porteous. They flipped the board to a 5–3 Democratic majority.

=== University of Michigan Board of Regents ===
Incumbent University of Michigan regents Democrat Kathy White and Republican David A. Brandon both sought re-election. Democrats White and Julia Donovan won, defeating Brandon, increasing the Democratic majority on the board to 6–2.

=== Wayne State University Board of Governors ===
Incumbent Democratic Wayne State University board member Eugene Driker sought re-election, while incumbent Republican Elizabeth Hardy did not. Democrats Driker and Debbie Dingell won election, raising the Democratic majority on the board to 7–1.

== Ballot initiatives ==
=== State ballot proposals ===
There were five state ballot initiatives in Michigan on November 7, 2006. Proposal 1, a state constitutional amendment protecting state conservation funds, preventing them from being appropriated for other purposes, was approved. Proposal 2, a state constitutional amendment banning affirmative action programs was approved. Proposal 3, a referendum that would have allowed the hunting of mourning doves, was defeated. Proposal 4, a state constitutional amendment restricting the use of eminent domain. was approved. Proposal 5, a legislative initiative which would have guaranteed an annual increase in education funding, was defeated.
