= Gaylord Herald Times =

American newspaper in Michigan

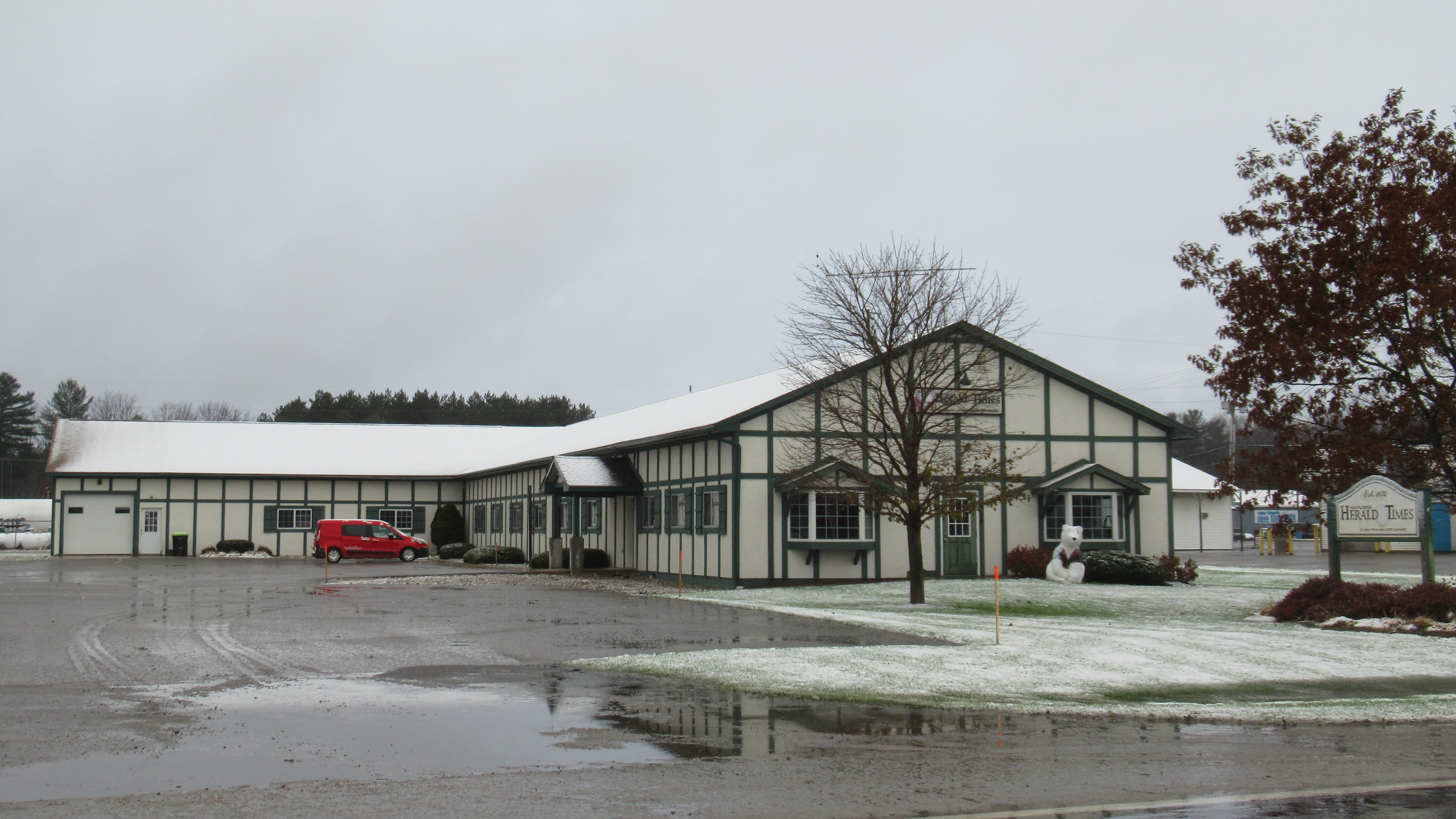
- Gaylord Herald Times headquarters
- Type: Newspaper
- Owner: USA Today Co.
- Publisher: Doug Caldwell
- Editor: Sarah Leach
- Founded: 1875
- Headquarters: 2058 S. Otsego Avenue; Gaylord, Michigan
- Circulation: 1,435 (as of 2022)
- Website: Official website

The Gaylord Herald Times is a twice-weekly newspaper in Gaylord, Michigan, United States.

== History ==
The Gaylord Herald Times was founded in 1875. The paper started publishing twice weekly in May 1999. In 2006, it was purchased by Schurz Communications purchased the paper along with its sister publications, the Petoskey News-Review and the Charlevoix Courier in 2006. It was sold again to GateHouse Media in 2019.
