= Carmela Remigio =

Italian operatic soprano

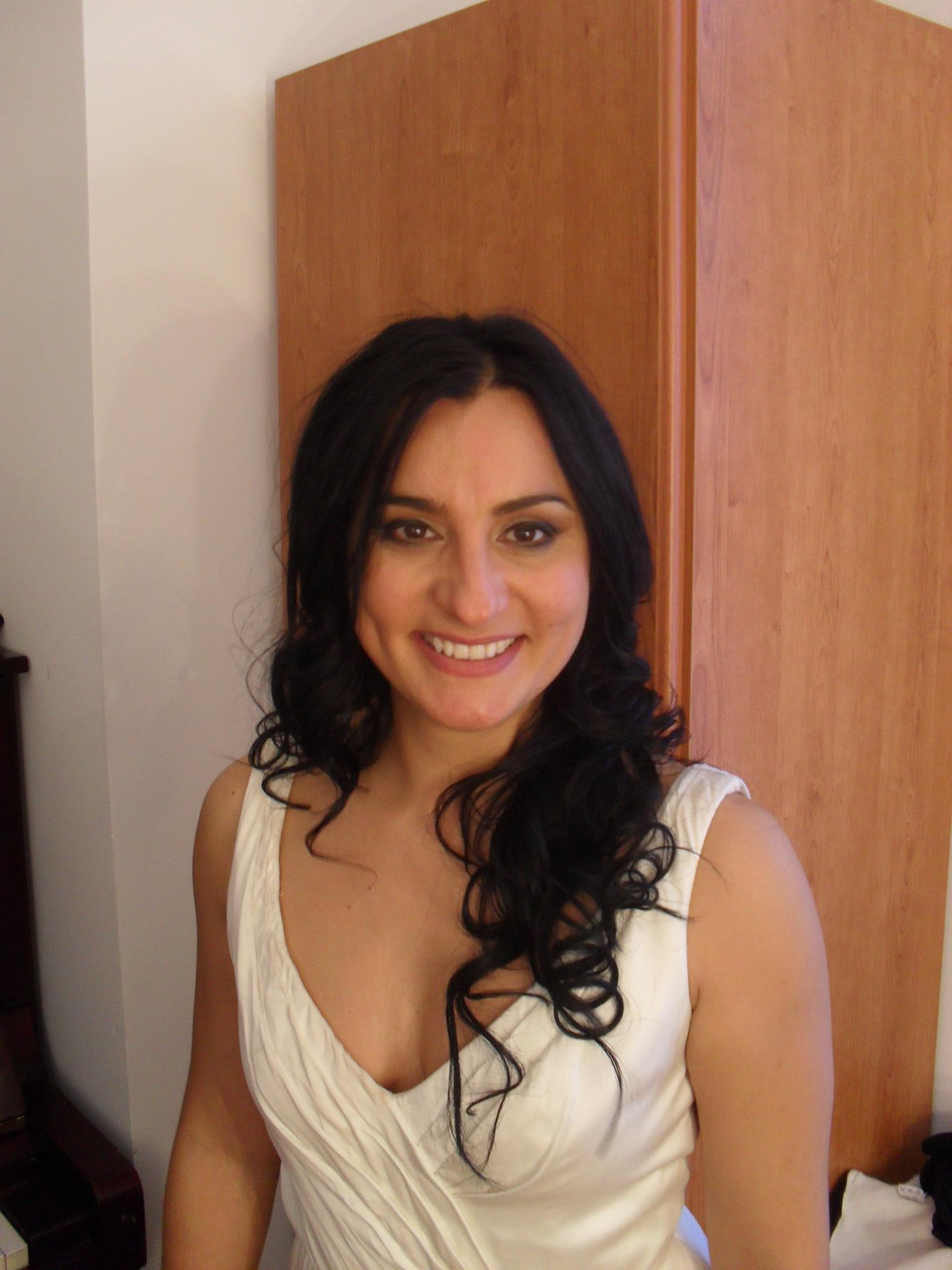
- Remigio in 2011
- Born: 1973 (age 52–53); Pescara, Italy
- Occupation: Opera singer (soprano)
- Years active: 1994–present
- Website: www.carmelaremigio.net

Carmela Remigio (born 1973) is an Italian operatic soprano.

== Biography ==
Carmela Remigio was born in Pescara and began to study violin when she was five years old. She later began vocal training with Aldo Protti at the Accademia Musicale Pescarese. After graduating she continued her vocal training with Leone Magiera. In 1992 she won first prize at the Luciano Pavarotti International Voice Competition in Philadelphia. From 1997 she performed with Luciano Pavarotti in more than 70 concerts around the world.

Remigio made her professional debut at the Teatro Massimo in Palermo in 1993 in the title role of Giampaolo Testoni's new opera Alice. Her early roles were in baroque opera and Mozart's operas, singing all of their main soprano roles: Susanna and Countess in The Marriage of Figaro, Elettra and Ilia in Idomeneo, Fiordiligi in Così fan tutte, Vitellia in La clemenza di Tito, Pamina in Die Zauberflöte. She has been in over four-hundred-fifty performances of Don Giovanni, singing both Donna Elvira and Donna Anna, the latter role allowing her to work with Peter Brook and Claudio Abbado, with whom she recorded, as a still very young artist, a prestigious version of Mozart's masterpiece under the label Deutsche Grammophon (1998).

Since then she has collaborated with conductors such as Antonio Pappano, Myung-Whun Chung, Jeffrey Tate, Daniele Gatti, Daniel Harding, Gustavo Dudamel, Riccardo Chailly, Gianandrea Noseda, Fabio Luisi, Juraj Valčuha, John Axelrod, Roberto Abbado, Lorin Maazel, Michel Plasson, Eliahu Inbal, Michele Mariotti, Kent Nagano, Rinaldo Alessandrini; and stage directors like David McVicar, Graham Vick, Pier Luigi Pizzi, Federico Tiezzi, Karole Armitage, Mario Martone, Luca Ronconi, Damiano Michieletto, and Robert Wilson.

Her Verdian roles include Alice in Falstaff (under Claudio Abbado and Lorin Maazel at the Salzburg Festival), Desdemona in Otello, Messa da Requiem, Amelia in Simon Boccanegra, and Violetta in La traviata. Her repertoire includes operas by Puccini, like La bohème (Mimì) and Turandot (Liù); by Donizetti, of whom she interpreted his entire "Three Tudor Queens Cycle" (Maria Stuarda, Roberto Devereux, and Anna Bolena); and by Rossini, like L'inganno felice, Maometto secondo, Il viaggio a Reims and Mosè in Egitto. Other roles are both the protagonist and Adalgisa in Norma, respectively at the Teatro Petruzzelli in Bari and at the Baths of Caracalla in Rome (and in many other theatres), Micaela (Carmen) and Cleopatra (Giulio Cesare) at the Teatro Carlo Felice in Genoa, Marguerite (Faust) at the Teatro Verdi in Trieste, Malwina (Marschner's Der Vampyr) at the Teatro Comunale di Bologna, Alceste at the Teatro La Fenice in Venice, Euridice (Orfeo ed Euridice) at the Teatro di San Carlo in Naples, Armida in Handel's Rinaldo at Festival della Valle d'Itria.

Beyond the Italian repertoire she has sung Tatiana in Tchaikovsky's Eugene Onegin at the Teatro di San Carlo in Naples, Anne Trulove in Stravinsky's The Rake's Progress at the Teatro Massimo di Palermo and at Teatro La Fenice in Venice with Damiano Michieletto's staging, Miranda in Alfredo Casella's La donna serpente at the Teatro Regio di Torino and Nedda in Leoncavallo's Pagliacci at the Teatro dell'Opera di Roma.

She performs both opera and chamber music – sacred and secular – in the main Italian and international theatres, music festivals and concert halls: Teatro alla Scala in Milan, Salzburg Festival, London's Royal Opera House, Teatro di San Carlo in Naples, Sferisterio Opera Festival in Macerata, Teatro Comunale di Bologna, Aix-en-Province Festival, Teatro La Fenice in Venice, Teatro Regio di Torino, Teatro Massimo di Palermo, Teatro Petruzzelli di Bari, La Monnaie in Brussels, and then Lausanne, Tokyo, Trieste, Lugano, Florence, Los Angeles, Paris.

Some her most relevant recordings include two different editions of Don Giovanni (Donna Anna), one of the two under Claudio Abbado (Deutsche Grammophon) and the other under Daniel Harding (Virgin), Rossini's Stabat Mater conducted by Gianluigi Gelmetti (Agorà), Arie Sacre Verdiane under Myung-Whun Chung (Deutsche Grammophon), a double CD titled Arias (Universal-Decca) dedicated to Tosti and Rossini.

In 2010 she was awarded with the "Ciattè d'oro", the highest honor of Pescara, and in 2012 she was also nominated Abruzzo Ambassador in the world. In 2016 Remigio was awarded the "Premio Abbiati" by the Associazione Critici Musicali Italiani for her "technique, musicality and stage presence that allow her to deliver undoubtedly valuable performances, supported by a proper knowledge of the style of each score".

Some of her upcoming engagements include Don Giovanni (Elvira) at Teatro La Fenice in Venice; Pagliacci (Nedda) at Bologna's Teatro Comunale; Rossini’s cantata La riconoscenza at Rossini Opera Festival; Lucrezia Borgia at Festival Donizetti in Bergamo; La clemenza di Tito at Barcelona's Liceu.

== Discography ==
- Don Giovanni (Donna Anna) W. A. Mozart, conducted by Claudio Abbado, Deutsche Grammophon
- Don Giovanni (Donna Anna) W. A. Mozart, conducted by Daniel Harding, Virgin
- Maria Stuarda (Maria Stuarda) G. Donizetti, conducted by Fabrizio Maria Carminati, Dynamic
- Norma (Adalgisa) V. Bellini, conducted by Fabrizio Maria Carminati, Bongiovanni
- Chérubin (Nina) G. Massenet, conducted by Emmanuel Villaume, Dynamic
- L'inganno felice (Isabella) G. Rossini, conducted by Giancarlo Andretta, Mondo Musica
- La molinara (Eugenia) G. Paisiello, conducted by Ivor Bolton, BMG Ricordi
- Stabat Mater G. Rossini, conducted by Gianluigi Gelmetti, Agorà
- Sogno, arie from F. P. Tosti, at the piano Leone Magiera, Decca
- Gioachino Rossini - Arias, arie from G. Rossini, at the piano Leone Magiera, Decca
- Arie Sacre Verdiane, arie from G. Verdi, conducted by Wyung-Wnun Chung, Deutsche Grammophon.
