= Leone Magiera =

Italian pianist and conductor

- Born: June 26, 1934 (age 92); Modena, Italy
- Genres: Classical; Opera
- Occupations: conductor; pianist
- Instrument: Piano
- Website: Official website

Leone Magiera (born 26 June 1934) is an Italian pianist and conductor.

== Career ==
=== Early life ===
He was born in Modena in 1934, the son of an engineer named Ubaldo. He belonged to an ancient Modenese family of jurists. Anna Maria, his mother, was from a long line of large landowners.

A childhood music prodigy, he performed for the first time in concert at age 12. He grew up in Lino Rastelli, Giorgio Vidusso and Alberto Mozzati's school and graduated in piano at the age of 18 at the Conservatory "Arrigo Boito " of Parma. He later graduated in singing (didactic branch), choir direction, composition and choral music at Bologna Conservatory, Giovanni Battista Martini Conservatory.

=== Teaching and performing ===
He won a national competition to become a teacher at just 25 years old. He taught at the Conservatory for the next 35 years. His students were Mirella Freni, Luciano Pavarotti, Ruggero Raimondi, Peter Glossop. Mirella Freni was also his first wife. Magiera was opera singer Luciano Pavarotti's childhood friend, longtime accompanist pianist and favorite conductor, accompanying him in more than a thousand recitals, concerts, and operatic performances. He led the orchestra in Pavarotti's last performance, of the aria "Nessun dorma" from Turandot at the opening of the Torino Winter Olympic Games in 2006.

As a pianist, he has performed both as a soloist and as an accompanist to singers at all major festivals and concert halls; Among them, Teatro alla Scala, Maggio Musicale Fiorentino, Salzburg Festival, Vienna Musikverein, Paris Opera, Metropolitan of New York. As a conductor and composer he has collaborated with many of the most important conductors: Otto Klemperer, Carlo Maria Giulini, Claudio Abbado, Zubin Mehta, Carlos Kleiber, Georg Solti. With Herbert von Karajan he had an intense artistic relationship: von Karajan wanted him as a collaborator for numerous operatic productions and as a coordinator for singers at the Salzburg Festival.

During his career Magiera discovered several singing talents, such as soprano Carmela Remigio. He is involved in many masterclasses, both in Italy and abroad. He was artistic secretary of Teatro alla Scala (Milan), director of Maggio Musicale Fiorentino and music consultant and artistic director of various music associations. He has published volumes dedicated to singing, translated into many languages: Luciano Pavarotti, Mirella Freni and Ruggero Raimondi for memoirs. His discography, as pianist and orchestral conductor, includes hundreds of CDs and DVDs for EMI, DECCA, BASF, DDG labels.

He has recently resumed his solo pianist career and has been working on particularly complex programs, which have highlighted a solid technique and extraordinary musicality. After the CD with a selection of sonata by Clementi (ed. Bongiovanni), he has just published with AURA Music. He lives in Bologna.

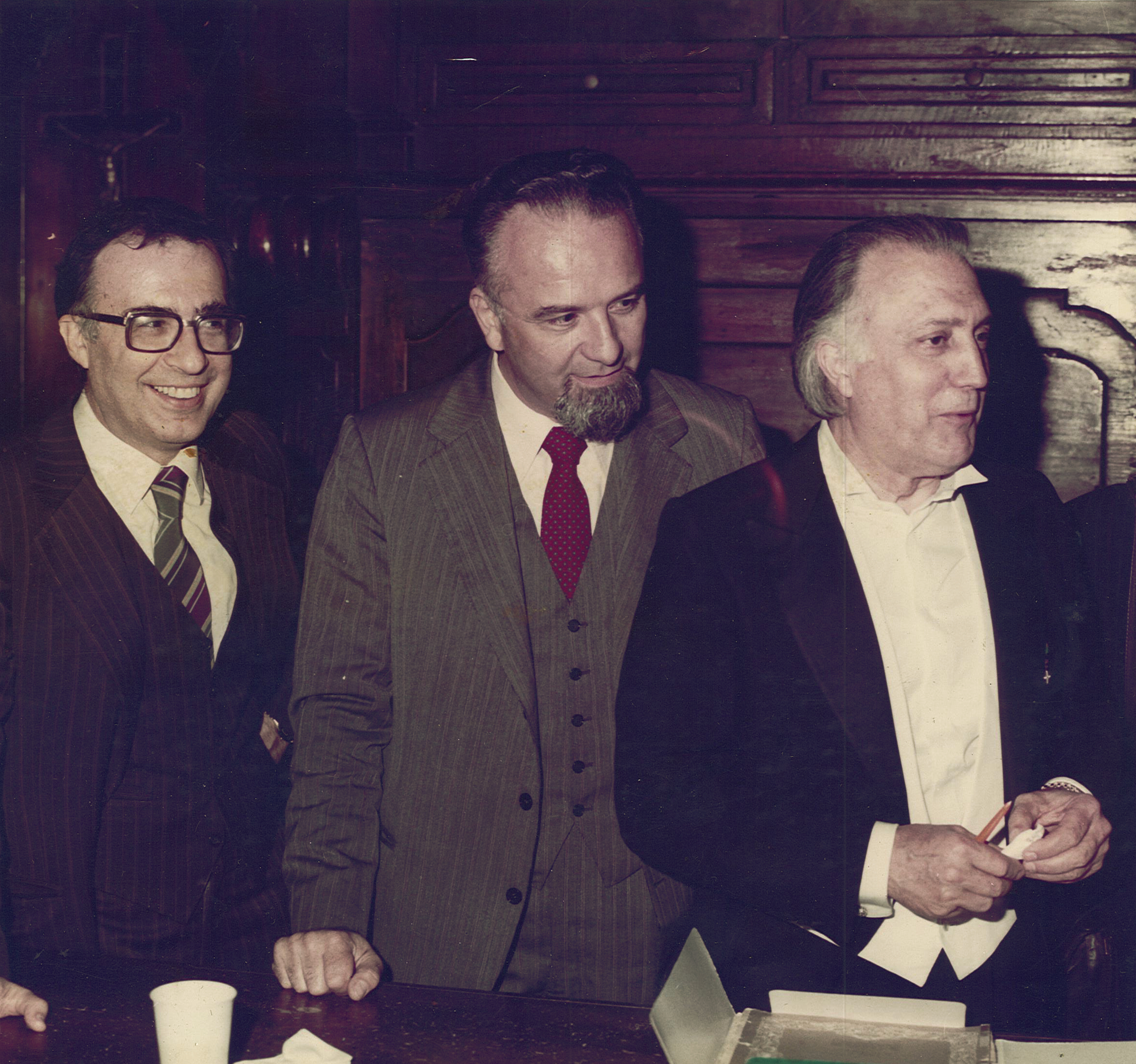
Giancarlo Bongiovanni with Piero Cappuccilli and Leone Magiera

== Personal life ==
Magiera was married to soprano Mirella Freni in 1955. The couple had one daughter. Magiera and Freni divorced in 1978. He later married gynecologist Lidia la Marca.

== See also ==
- Luciano Pavarotti
- Mirella Freni
- Parma Conservatory
