= Mackinac Island Town Crier =

Newspaper in Michigan

- Type: Weekly Seasonal Newspaper
- Format: Tabloid
- Owner(s): Hoffmann Michigan Media Group, LLC
- Publisher: Kim Ruley
- Editor: Alexis Rankin
- Founded: 1957
- Headquarters: Mackinac Island, Michigan
- Circulation: 2,700
- ISSN: 8750-040X
- OCLC number: 10945365
- Website: mackinacislandnews.com

The Mackinac Island Town Crier is a weekly, seasonal newspaper that covers events in and around Mackinac Island in the U.S. state of Michigan. The Town Crier was owned by the family of Wesley H. Maurer Sr. from 1957 until April 2023.

In 2023, the Mackinac Island Town Crier and the St. Ignace News were sold to Hoffmann Michigan Media Group, LLC part of the Hoffmann Family of Companies.

The newspaper publishes 22 times annually, weekly from May to October and once per month in December, February and April.
