= Trade Lines (newspaper) =

American newspaper

- Type: Weekly newspaper
- Format: Broadsheet
- Publisher: Trade Lines
- Founded: 1949
- Headquarters: 715 Market St., Suite B St. Joseph, Michigan 49085; United States
- Circulation: 44,000
- Price: Free

Trade Lines is a pennysaver-style free weekly newspaper consisting exclusively of classified and display advertising. It has been serving selected markets in Berrien and Van Buren counties in southwestern Michigan since 1949.

Trade Lines is distributed weekly each Monday to 44,000 households in the communities of Baroda, Benton Harbor, Berrien Springs, Berrien Center, Bridgman, Coloma, Eau Claire, Riverside, St. Joseph, Sawyer, Sodus, Stevensville, and Watervliet in Berrien County; and Hartford and South Haven in Van Buren County.

Each full page measures 11 x 22 inches (28 x 56 cm) in size, and the typical issue runs to eight pages (plus inserts).

== Sources ==
- Trade Lines, print issue of 2009-11-16.
