= The News-Herald (Southgate, Michigan) =

Newspaper in Southgate, Michigan

- Type: Semi-weekly newspaper
- Format: Broadsheet
- Owner: MediaNews Group
- Publisher: Jonathan Wolman
- Founded: 1879
- Headquarters: One Heritage Drive, Suite 100; Southgate, MI 48195
- Sister newspapers: The Detroit News; The Macomb Daily; The Oakland Press
- Website: thenewsherald.com

The News-Herald is a semi-weekly newspaper serving the Downriver suburbs of Detroit, published in Southgate, Michigan. It is owned by MediaNews Group. The newspaper is published every Wednesday and Sunday.

== History ==
The News-Herald's history dates back to the 1870s, when the Rev. George W. Owen established the Wyandotte Herald in Wyandotte, MI. After merging with the Wyandotte Daily News, from 1944 it was known as the Wyandotte News-Herald. The Mellus Newspapers started in the 1920s, subsequently flourished for decades under famous publisher/editor William Mellus.

The current News-Herald format was established under the Heritage Newspapers brand in 1986, when the late industrialist Heinz Prechter brought the old News-Herald (based in Wyandotte) and Mellus Newspapers (based in Lincoln Park) from SEM Newspapers Inc. and combined them into a single publication printed each Wednesday. In 1988, The News-Herald relocated to their current offices at Interstate 75 and Northline Road in Southgate, MI and launched "Weekender" editions in select communities, which was later incorporated into Heritage Sunday and is now known as the Sunday News-Herald. A Friday edition of The News-Herald delivered exclusively via the United States Postal Service began publishing on March 3, 2006 and was discontinued after the April 20, 2012 edition.

The News-Herald was owned by 21st Century Media until their merger with MediaNews Group in 2013.

In 2016 severe cuts to the newsroom left them with one sports reporter who split time also covering sports for the Dearborn Press & Guide, a sister newspaper in Dearborn, and three full time reporters to cover the communities Downriver. The Press & Guide closed on October 29, 2025, with the News-Herald assuming its subscribers and content archives.
