= Mass media in Grand Rapids, Michigan =

There are several media outlets in Grand Rapids, Michigan in the United States. These outlets serve Grand Rapids and the surrounding metropolitan area.

== Printed media ==
The Grand Rapids Press is the daily newspaper, while Advance Newspapers publishes a group of weekly papers providing more community-based news. Gemini Publications is a niche, regional publishing company that produces the weekly newspaper Grand Rapids Business Journal, the magazines Grand Rapids Magazine, Grand Rapids Family and Michigan Blue, and several other quarterly and annual business-to-business publications.

== Television ==
Grand Rapids, combined with nearby Kalamazoo and Battle Creek, was ranked in 2014 as the 40th largest television market in the U.S. by Nielsen Media Research. Stations serving the area include WWMT (CBS, licensed to Kalamazoo), WOOD (NBC), WZZM (ABC), and WXMI (Fox). Other stations include WOTV, an ABC affiliate licensed to Battle Creek, WZPX-TV (ION), and WTLJ (TCT). WXSP-CD, is a low-powered MyNetworkTV affiliate. With the merger of UPN and The WB Television Network into The CW Television Network WXSP lost its affiliation with UPN, the CW was carried on a separate digital broadcast by WWMT until 2023, is now carried on a separate digital broadcast by WOTV. WGVU is the area's PBS member station, along with satellite station WGVK. Grand Rapids Internet Television produces local, independent programming available on-line only. 3ABN broadcasts on their downlink station, owned and operated by 3ABN. WLLA is an independent station that carries Christian and Family-friendly programming with two separate networks with MeTV, and Retro Television.

The city has two public, educational, and government access (PEG) cable TV stations, GRTV and LiveWire that offer independent programming and news for the city. These two outlets are both produced by the Community Media Center, a cooperative of public-access television, nonprofit media affiliates. Two educational-access television channels and a government-access television (GATV) channel, the Grand Rapids Information Network (GRIN) are also available on cable. GRNow is an online site providing independent media.

== Radio ==
The Grand Rapids area is served by 16 AM radio stations and 28 FM stations. The nationally syndicated Free Beer and Hot Wings morning radio show, and the weekly "Frontlines of Freedom" military news and talk radio show are based out of Grand Rapids.

The most popular commercial radio stations in the market include WBCT-FM (country music), WSNX-FM and WHTS-FM (contemporary hit radio), WSRW-FM and WTRV-FM (adult contemporary), WOOD-AM (talk radio), WLAV-FM (classic rock), and WGRD-FM (active rock).

Non-commercial radio stations in the market include WBLU-FM (classical music), WCSG (Christian adult contemporary), WYCE-FM (community radio) and WGVU-FM (News/talk; jazz).
