= Tri-County Times =

Semiweekly newspaper

Coordinates: 42°47′53.2″N 83°43′31.4″W

- Type: Semi-weekly newspaper
- Owner(s): View Newspaper Group
- Publisher: Wes Smith
- Editor: Sharon Stone
- Founded: April 1994
- Headquarters: 256 N. Fenway Drive Fenton, Genesee County, Michigan
- Circulation: 5,286 (as of 2022)
- ISSN: 1526-4300
- OCLC number: 42258448
- Website: tctimes.com

The Tri-County Times is one of two semiweekly newspapers in Genesee County, Michigan. But while the Flint Journal serves primarily most of Genesee County, as far south as Grand Blanc and is published Thursdays, Fridays, and Sundays, the Times serves the greater Fenton area, and is published Wednesdays and Sundays. It has been owned by Rockman Communications since its establishment on April 3, 1994.

The Times started out as a weekly newspaper. The Wednesday edition was introduced in September 1999. It built offices and printing facilities at 240 N. Fenway Drive in 1997. In 2005, it built a second building to house its offices at 256 N. Fenway Drive. Rockman Communications also owns Tri-County Wireless, which provides wireless internet services. Until 2009, it was the largest semiweekly newspaper in Michigan.

The circulation as of November 2009 was 13,825 on Wednesdays, 24,875 on Sundays. The newspapers's primary focus is local news and conservative politics. The newspaper was sold to the View Newspaper Group effective 1 January 2019. The paper is still produced from the offices at 256 N. Fenway Drive but is now printed at its sister company Michigan Web Press which is based in Davisburg, MI.

== tctimes.com ==
The Times' official website provides news updates online on a daily basis. Many stories are posted online before being placed in the Wednesday or Sunday print editions. Its web-presence was launched in 1996, long before other newspapers in the state.
