= Livingston County Daily Press & Argus =

Daily newspaper in Howell, Michigan

- Type: Daily newspaper
- Format: Broadsheet
- Owner: USA Today Co.
- Editor: Cassandra Lybrink
- Founded: 1843
- Headquarters: 323 E. Grand River Ave. Howell, MI 48843; United States
- Circulation: 6,999 daily 9,242 Sunday (as of 2022)
- Website: livingstondaily.com

The Livingston County Daily Press & Argus is a daily newspaper published in Howell, Michigan, and owned by USA Today Co.. It covers news and sports within Livingston County and had offices in both Howell and Brighton. The Brighton office closed in December 2008. Its printing facility was located in Howell Township. It publishes every day, except Saturday.

== History ==
The newspaper's roots can be traced back to 1843 and the Livingston Courier. It was the county's first and only newspaper until Howell resident George W. Lee launched the Livingston Republican in 1855. In 1857 the Courier folded, was purchased by a Democrat and renamed the Livingston Democrat. That paper folded in 1890 and was bought by a group of Democrats, who ran it until 1928.

One year later, the Democrat and Republican merged to become the Livingston County Republican Press. In 1937 the paper shortened its name to the Livingston County Press. In 1993 the state designated the paper a registered historic site. On September 7, 2000, two weekly newspapers, The Brighton Argus and Livingston County Press, merged and became what is currently known as the Livingston County Daily Press & Argus.

Gannett, which also runs the Lansing State Journal and Detroit Free Press, bought the newspaper from the HomeTown Communications Network in April 2005. The newspaper saw an increase in circulation in 2009 after the Ann Arbor News became AnnArbor.com, reducing its publishing days to twice a week, and the Flint Journal reduced its publishing days to three days a week.
