= The Macomb Daily =

Daily newspaper in Clinton Township, Michigan

- The April 25, 2010, front page of The Macomb Daily
- Type: Daily newspaper
- Format: Broadsheet
- Owner: Digital First Media
- Headquarters: Clinton Township, Macomb County, Michigan; United States
- Sister newspapers: The News-Herald; The Oakland Press
- Website: macombdaily.com

The Macomb Daily is a daily newspaper with its headquarters in Clinton Township, Macomb County, Michigan, United States, in Metro Detroit. It is the only daily newspaper serving Macomb County, making the county the largest in Michigan in terms of population with only one daily newspaper. It is owned by Digital First Media.

== History ==
The Macomb Daily is co-owned with the Oakland Press and the (Royal Oak) Daily Tribune, both in Oakland County, the (Southgate) News-Herald and The Voice in northern Macomb and St. Clair counties. As a result of their co-ownership, staff writers from those newspapers often appear in The Macomb Daily, and staff writers of the Macomb Daily appear in those same newspapers in return.

The Macomb Daily was formed by the merger of The Mt. Clemens Monitor Leader, The South Macomb News and The Tri City Progress in 1964. Panax Newspapers owned the newly merged paper until owner John McGoff got into legal problems accepting money from the South African government. The Macomb Daily was part of Global Communications and later SEM Newspapers in the late 1970s and 1980s. The Macomb Daily operated Monday through Saturday and grew rapidly from 38,000 to 56,000 newspapers daily. The Macomb Daily was one of the first daily newspapers to automate its circulation onto computers. The paper has a large fleet of 20 delivery vans that date back to 1977, with the Ford Macomb Daily in blue with white strips. In 1982 The Macomb Daily decided to make The Community News its TMC edition in the south end and The Advisor in the northern end of the county.

The Macomb Daily leased a new editorial and business operation center at 100 Macomb Daily Lane on the shores of the Clinton River in Mt. Clemens, just outside the city's downtown core in 1994. In 2013, the paper moved to 19176 Hall Road in Clinton Township.

== Operations ==
The newspaper was previously headquartered in Mount Clemens.

== In popular culture ==
The Macomb Daily is the newspaper which appears at the end of the current policy trailer for MJR Theatres, a regional movie theater chain.
