= Iraq Sun =

- Type: Online newspaper
- Owner(s): Midwest Radio Network
- Publisher: Big News Network
- Founded: 2002; 23 years ago
- Headquarters: Sydney, Australia
- Website: iraqsun.com

The Iraq Sun is an online newspaper servicing in Iraq. Its September 2002 origins preceded the 2003 invasion. The online publication is part of a network of news sites operating around the globe.

The online site's slogan is “the voice of the Iraqi Nation.” The main topic is Iraq, with a particular focus on events in Baghdad and other major cities, as well as international news and coverage of other topics including Muslim news.

Iraq Sun is administered by global media group Midwest Radio Network, which is headquartered in Sydney, Australia with offices in the United Arab Emirates. The group's digital platform is described as a network of eNewspapers - modeled on newspaper-type names and layout. Domain names were registered in 2002 with sites being rolled out from 2003. The network has approximately 135 sites.

The publication provides RSS feeds, daily email bulletins and facilitates news release publishing.

The Iraq Sun online newspaper is unrelated to a Dearborn Heights, Michigan conventional newspaper which began publishing in 2005 by Iraq Media Inc. to serve Iraqi and Arab people living in Detroit, Southfield, Michigan, Oak Park, Michigan, Sterling Heights, Michigan, Farmington, Michigan, Dearborn, Michigan, Dearborn Heights, Michigan, Westland, Michigan, Ann Arbor, Michigan, Inkster, Michigan, Washington, DC, Los Angeles, and San Diego, California. Now defunct, the former newspaper was a 24-page bi-weekly free newspaper, supported solely by advertising. It printed 15,000 to 20,000 copies each issue and was edited by Emad Al-kasid.
