= The Oakland Press =

Daily newspaper in Oakland County, Michigan

- Type: Daily newspaper
- Format: Broadsheet
- Owner: MediaNews Group
- Founded: 1972
- Headquarters: 2125 Butterfield Dr. Troy, MI 48084
- Sister newspapers: The Macomb Daily; The News Herald
- OCLC number: 15217724
- Website: theoaklandpress.com

The Oakland Press is a daily newspaper published in Oakland County, Michigan with headquarters in Troy. It is owned by MediaNews Group. The local historical society traces its origins to The Pontiac Gazette, founded in 1843. The paper has been published under various names, including The Pontiac Press, until it was named The Oakland Press in 1972. Original editorials and reporting, including major-sport beat writers, are also carried in the sister paper The Macomb Daily.

The Oakland Press was previously owned by 21st Century Media until its merger with MediaNews Group in 2013.
