= Benton Spirit =

- Type: Weekly newspaper
- Format: Tabloid
- Publisher: Priscella Tobias
- Editor: Desmond Murray
- Headquarters: P.O. Box 465; Benton Harbor, Michigan 49023; United States
- Website: bentonspiritnews.com

The Benton Spirit is a community newspaper for "informing, enhancing, showcasing, promoting, and educating" residents of southwest Michigan and northern Indiana. It is published weekly on Thursday.
