= Berrien County Record =

- Type: Weekly newspaper
- Format: Tabloid/Compact
- Owner(s): Randy Hendrixson and Jessica Bramblette
- Publisher: Randy Hendrixson and Jessica Bramblette
- Founded: 1867
- Headquarters: 324 E Dewey St Suite 200 Buchanan, Michigan 49107 United States
- Circulation: 395 (as of 2022)
- Website: bcrnews.net

The Berrien County Record is an independent weekly newspaper that serves all of Berrien County, Michigan, as the publication of record for legal notices. The Berrien County Record is one of the longest-running newspapers in Berrien County, having been founded in 1867. The Berrien County Record has ceased publication as a community newspaper and focuses only on county wide legal and courthouse news. Covering both North and South County courthouses.
