= The Collegian (Hillsdale College) =

Student newspaper of Hillsdale College

- Type: Student newspaper
- School: Hillsdale College
- Founded: 1878
- Website: hillsdalecollegian.com

The Collegian is the weekly student newspaper of Hillsdale College in Hillsdale, Michigan, published in one form or another since 1878. The publication is staffed by students, many of whom are members of the Herbert Henry Dow II program in American journalism. In addition to its weekly printing, the paper is available online.

== History and description ==
The Collegian is the oldest college newspaper in Michigan. The paper's history traces back to 1878, when the Hillsdale Herald was first published. The administration started The Collegian in 1893 as a rival paper to the Herald.

In 1896, the two papers merged and became the Herald-Collegian. Eventually, the newspaper dropped the Herald and became The Collegian of Hillsdale College. Today it is known simply as The Collegian. In 2014, staff at the Kalamazoo College Index claimed that the Index predated the Collegian. But, after an investigation by the Collegian's Editor-in-Chief at the time, it was determined that Hillsdale is Michigan's oldest college newspaper. The Index began as a publication in 1877, which predates the Hillsdale Herald, but did not become a newspaper until 1916, 20 years after the Herald had merged with the Collegian to become the Hillsdale Herald-Collegian.

The Collegian has won several Michigan Press Association awards including General Excellence in 2011. The newspaper had a three-year streak in 2007, 2008 and 2009 where editors of the paper were named Journalists of the Year by the Michigan Press Association.
