= Iosco County News-Herald =

- Type: Weekly newspaper
- Publisher: Ray McGrew
- Editor: John Morris
- Headquarters: 110 W State Street, East Tawas, MI 48730
- Circulation: 3,050 (as of 2022)
- Website: iosconews.com

The Iosco County News-Herald is the newspaper of record for Iosco County, Michigan. Its offices are located at 110 West State Street in East Tawas. The paper publishes weekly on Wednesdays. The paper's sister publication is the Oscoda Press.
