= Ionia Sentinel-Standard =

Newspaper in Ionia, Michigan

- Type: Weekly newspaper
- Format: Broadsheet
- Owner: USA Today Co.
- Editor: Cassandra Lybrink
- Founded: 1866, as Ionia County Sentinel
- Headquarters: 114 North Depot Street, Ionia, Michigan 48846
- Circulation: 1,353 (as of 2022)
- ISSN: 0745-2128
- Website: sentinel-standard.com

The Ionia Sentinel-Standard is a newspaper published in Ionia, Michigan. It is owned by USA Today Co.

The newspaper covers Ionia County including the cities of Ionia, Belding and Portland, and the villages of Lake Odessa, Lyons, Muir, Hubbardston, Palo, Pewamo, Orleans, Clarksville and Saranac.

The Ionia Daily Sentinel-Standard was created in 1919 through the merger of the Ionia Daily Sentinel and The Ionia Daily Standard. The Ionia Standard had begun as a weekly newspaper in 1873; the Sentinel name dates back to the Ionia County Sentinel weekly, established in 1866.
