= Italian Tribune-La Tribuna del Popolo =

Italian-American newspaper

The Italian Tribune
- Type: Newspaper
- Founder: Vincent Giuliano
- Publisher: Marilyn Borner and Pam White
- Editor: Marilyn Borner
- Founded: 1909
- Headquarters: 21852 23 Mile Rd, Macomb, MI 48042
- Website: italian-tribune.com

The Italian Tribune (La Tribune del Popolo) is a newspaper first published in Detroit, Michigan on May 1, 1909, as La Tribuna Italiana del Michigan. It was founded by Vincent Giuliano, with the help of his wife, Maria Giuliano. Vincent had been publishing a newspaper in Chicago for the Italian textile workers when a group of auto workers in Detroit asked him to start a similar paper in Detroit to bring the community together.

The paper was originally written in Italian, but the majority of the newspaper today is written mostly in English. The newspaper serves as a history of the Italian American community in Metro Detroit.
