= Sturgis Journal =

Newspaper in Sturgis, Michigan

- Type: Daily newspaper
- Format: Broadsheet
- Owner: USA Today Co.
- Publisher: Orestes Baez
- Editor: Candice Phelps
- Founded: July 4, 1859, as The Sturgis Journal
- Headquarters: 205 East Chicago Road, Sturgis, Michigan 49091, United States
- Circulation: 3,586 (as of 2022)
- OCLC number: 36360256
- Website: sturgisjournal.com

The Sturgis Journal is a daily newspaper published in Sturgis, Michigan, United States. It is owned by USA Today Co. Previous owner GateHouse Media acquired the paper from Independent Media Group in 2000.

The Journal covers Sturgis and other St. Joseph County communities such as Burr Oak, Centreville, Colon, Constantine, Mendon, Three Rivers and White Pigeon.

The newspaper bills itself as the oldest business in the city of Sturgis. It began as a weekly newspaper, The Sturgis Journal, on July 4, 1859, later known as the Sturgis Journal-Times. It switched to daily publication under the name Sturgis Daily Journal in 1916. The words "the" and "daily" were dropped in 1946.
