= The St. Ignace News =

- Type: Weekly newspaper
- Owner(s): Hoffmann Michigan Media Group, LLC
- Publisher: Kim Ruley
- Editor: Alexis Rankin
- Founded: 1878
- Headquarters: 359 Reagon Street, Saint Ignace, MI 49781
- Circulation: 3,794 (as of 2022)
- Website: stignacenews.com

The St. Ignace News is a weekly newspaper that covers events in and around St. Ignace and Mackinac County in the U.S. state of Michigan. The newspaper's coverage area includes a substantial portion of the eastern Upper Peninsula of Michigan, including the Les Cheneaux Islands summer resort area northeast of St. Ignace.

== History ==
The newspaper was founded in 1878. In 2023, the St. Ignace News and the Mackinac Island Town Crier were sold to Hoffmann Michigan Media Group, LLC part of the Hoffmann Family of Companies.
