= Petoskey News-Review =

Newspaper in Petoskey, Michigan

- Type: Daily newspaper
- Owner: USA Today Co.
- Publisher: Michelle Harrington; Christy Lyons
- Editor: Sarah Leach
- Founded: 1878 (as the Petoskey City Record)
- Headquarters: 319 State Street; Petoskey, Michigan
- Circulation: 2,520 (as of 2022)
- ISSN: 1093-0108
- Website: petoskeynews.com

The Petoskey News-Review is the daily newspaper of Petoskey, Michigan.

== History ==
Started in 1878 as the Petoskey City Record, after subsequent mergers it became The Petoskey Evening News. In 1953, this paper merged with The Northern Michigan Review to become the Petoskey News-Review. In 2006, the paper, along with its sister publications, was purchased by Schurz Communications of South Bend, Indiana. In 2019, it was sold to GateHouse Media. The paper publishes daily five days a week.
