= The Chart (newspaper) =

Student newspaper of Missouri Southern State University

- Type: Student newspaper
- School: Missouri Southern State University
- Founder: Kenneth McCaleb
- Founded: 1939
- City: Joplin, Missouri
- Website: thechartonline.com

The Chart is the student newspaper of Missouri Southern State University in Joplin, Missouri. The paper was founded in 1939 by Kenneth McCaleb, a student at what was then Joplin Junior College. The newspaper is printed weekly during the fall and spring semesters, for a total of 24 issues a year, and is written, edited and graphically designed by Missouri Southern students.

== Structure ==
The newspaper falls under the university's department of communications and offers credit hours, along with hands-on experience, to students on its staff. Though owned by and receiving partial operations funding from Missouri Southern, The Chart's editorial content is selected, written and edited entirely by student staff. A majority of the students who serve on The Chart staff are communications majors, though the staff is open to students of all majors if they fulfill a set of prerequisites as prescribed by the newspaper's adviser. Students majoring in English, history, art, business and various other fields have all served in various capacities on The Chart. The positions a student might have the opportunity to hold on the staff include editor, staff writer, copyeditor, graphic designer, cartoonist, advertising staff and photographer.

Editors, writers and photographers write and produce the 12- to 14-page broadsheet newspaper. The newsroom contains some of the area’s most up-to-date hardware and software to help prepare students for the professional arena. Students can advance quickly through the ranks of The Chart. Editors qualify for performing aid awards (scholarships) and student help funding as well as other scholarships designed to encourage students to pursue careers in print journalism.

The Chart primarily focuses on campus news, sports, events, people and issues, but coverage also branches out to community, state, national and international stories. Until 2011, The Chart stationed a student editor at the Missouri State Capitol each spring during the General Assembly. Many state legislators and college and university presidents read the newspaper in the 1980s and 1990s for the latest information on Missouri s higher education. Upper-level editors have taken their knowledge and experience around the globe. Past editors traveled to China, Latin America, Germany, France, Japan, Cuba and Russia, and upon their return, have produced award-winning news supplements and magazines.

== History ==
As a student at Missouri Southern’s predecessor Joplin Junior College, Kenneth McCaleb (1920-2002) saw a need for a student newspaper. In the fall of 1939, the first issue of The Chart appeared on the school’s campus. McCaleb had chosen the name The Chart to serve as a scale to measure the school’s success, having only been founded in 1937.

In its early years, The Chart had numerous faculty members serve as advisers to it and it fell under the jurisdiction of the English department. In 1948, Cleetis Headlee (1911-2000), professor of English and journalism, took the position as faculty adviser of the newspaper. It was during her tenure that the publication went on to win its first statewide awards. Headlee, known as being a stickler for accuracy, served in that role for 19 years, before stepping down in 1967, though she continued serving as an English professor at the college until retiring in 1976.

After Headlee’s departure as adviser, the quality and funding for The Chart degraded significantly. But the 1972 arrival of Richard Massa (1932-2019) to serve as adviser brought the newspaper new life. Massa used his early time as adviser to rebuild the staff and work on securing adequate funding. Through his leadership, the student staff was bringing in major awards within just a few years. Massa used the success of The Chart as seed for a new college department and in 1980 the department of communications was created, with Massa serving as director, a title he held until his retirement in 1999.

As Massa’s duties increased with the new department, he hired a former Chart editor-in-chief to replace him as adviser. Chad Stebbins (1960-), who graduated from Missouri Southern in 1982, took on the role as adviser in 1984 and continued the legacy of success that had been instilled by Headlee and Massa before him. Under his watch, The Chart twice won the Society of Professional Journalists’ best in the nation award for a non-daily college newspaper. In 1999, the College Media Advisers named Stebbins the National Newspaper Adviser of the Year. Stebbins' close watch of The Chart continued until 1999, when he was promoted to be director of the university's Institute of International Studies. Since that time, the role of publications manager (a professional staff position) has handled most of the day-to-day management of the student staff. T.R. Hanrahan (1964-2021), another former Chart editor-in-chief, served as publications manager from 2006 until 2011. Olive Sullivan (1960-) was named faculty adviser to The Chart in August 2011. The newspaper has seen a significant drop in the number of participating students and campus readership.

== The McCaleb Initiative for Peace ==
In 1998, Chart founder Kenneth McCaleb and his wife, Margaret Baughman McCaleb established the McCaleb Initiative for Peace at Missouri Southern State University for the purpose of examining the causes of war and discussing ways by which war can be prevented. McCaleb, who had been a prisoner of war in Germany during World War II, directed that the focus of the Initiative be on Missouri Southern student journalists who, on assignments for The Chart, will, during the lifetime of the Initiative, visit sites of former wars and perhaps present conflicts. They will visit monuments to past victories and defeats and visit with survivors of wars, and they will write and publish their observations. These reporters will compile memories of veterans of battles, of prisoner of war camps, of concentration camps, of resettlement camps, of refugee centers, and of those who worked or officiated at such centers. They will detail in their reporting the devastation wreaked by war. They will visit institutes where the study of war and the promotion of peace are principal concerns, and they shall report upon their findings. In so doing, The Chart will strive to become an instrument for peace and create for its readers, particularly for the students of Missouri Southern State University, vivid notions of the horrors of war.

== Awards ==
The Missouri College Media Association named The Chart Best in State six times in 11 years: 1994, 1996, 1997, 2001, 2003 and 2004. The Chart has won multiple Associated Collegiate Press Pacemakers, both at the regional and national level. For 1995 and 1996, The Chart was named the best non-daily college newspaper in the nation by the Society of Professional Journalists.

== Hall of Fame ==
The Chart inducted McCaleb, Headlee, Jack Brannan, and Massa into its first Hall of Fame class in 2012. In 2017, Marion A. Ellis, Rich Hood, Pam Johnson, Liz Johnson, and Stebbins were inducted. In November 2014, The Chart dedicated a Hall of Fame area on the third floor of Webster Hall with members of the MSSU Board of Regents in attendance. The Hall of Fame includes McCaleb's original typewriter, pictures of the four inductees, and other artifacts.

== Notable Chart Alumni ==
Ron Martin — Retired Editor, Atlanta Journal-Constitution

Jack Brannan — Retired, United Press International, New York Stock Exchange, Tulsa World

Pam Johnson — Executive Director, Donald W. Reynolds Journalism Institute, University of Missouri; Former Executive Editor, Arizona Republic; Kansas City Star, where she shared the Pulitzer Prize for her reporting on the Kansas City Hyatt Regency walkway collapse

Tony Feather — Missouri-based American political consultant for the Republican National Committee and Republican candidates who specializes in direct voter contact.

Christopher Clark — Associated Press

Rick Rogers — Vice President, Operations, American Consolidated Media (Irving, TX)

Jake Griffin — Chief investigative reporter, The Daily Herald, suburban Chicago

Noppadol Paothong — Missouri Conservationist

Gloria Turner — Former Managing Editor, Joplin Globe

John Hacker — Editor, The Carthage (Mo.) Press

Jacob Brower — Publisher, The Monett (Mo.) Times and Cassville (Mo.) Democrat. Former editor, The (Searcy, Ark.) Daily Citizen
