= Tri-Lakes =

Tri-Lakes can refer to a place in the United States:

- Tri-Lakes, Colorado
- Tri-Lakes, Indiana
- A portion of the Ozarks in Southwestern Missouri served by the Branson Tri-Lakes News.
