= Daily World =

The Daily World is the name of various newspapers:

- The Daily World (Aberdeen), Washington
- The Daily World (Helena), Arkansas
- Atlanta Daily World
- Greene County (Indiana) Daily World
- Daily World (Opelousas), Louisiana
- The Vancouver Daily World
- Atlantic City Daily World

== See also ==
- World (disambiguation)#Periodicals
