= Rust Communications =

American media company

- Founded: 1967
- Founder: Gary W. Rust
- Headquarters location: 301 Broadway; Cape Girardeau, Missouri
- Official website: rustcommunications.com

Rust Communications is an American privately owned media company based in Cape Girardeau, Missouri. The Southeast Missourian is its flagship publication.

== History ==
In 1967, Gary W. Rust purchased the Weekly Bulletin, a weekly newspaper in Cape Girardeau, Missouri. Previously he worked at his family's furniture store. He then purchased the Dexter Statesman in 1982, Southeast Missourian from Thomson Newspapers in 1986, the Daily Dunklin Democrat of Kennett in 1989 and Daily American Republic of Poplar Bluff in 1990.

In 1993, Gary Rust, who was president of Concord Publishing House, Inc., founded a media company called Rust Communications, Inc. The new business would manage all the papers Rust owned, including four dallies, three weeklies and four free publications. At the time, the network was the largest non-metropolitan circulated newspaper group in Missouri, with 107,00 weekly distribution and 55,00 paid daily distribution.

In 1994, Rust purchased nine newspapers in Missouri and Arkansas from American Publishing Company. The sale included the Blytheville Courier News, Malden Delta News, Malden Press-Merit, Tri-State Big Nickel, Caruthersville Bootheel Beacon, Caruthersville Democrat Argus, The Hayti Democrat Argus, Stoddard County Delta News and the Osceola Times.

In 1996, Rust purchased the Sikeston Standard-Democrat. In 1997, Rust Communications acquired four dallies and two weeklies from USMedia Group Inc. The sale included two Missouri dallies: the Marshall Democrat-News and the Nevada Daily Mail; along with the McCook Daily Gazette in Nebraska; and Le Mars Daily Sentinel in Iowa. The sale also included the Mountain Home News in Idaho. In 1999, Rust acquired the Greencastle Banner-Graphic.

In January 2001, Rust Communications acquired seven newspapers from Paxton Media Group. The sale included two dailies: the Dyersburg State Gazette in Tennessee and The Brazil Times in Indiana; and five weeklies: The News of Salem, the South Missourian News of Thayer and three shoppers. A month later Gary Rust retired in February 2001. His sons Jon. K. Rust and Rex D. Rust were then named co-presidents of the company. At the time Rust Communications owned 13 dallies, 33 weeklies, 10 shoppers and 12 separate printing operations across seven states.

In January 2003, Rust Communications acquired several newspaper in Iowa and one in Indiana from Community Newspaper Holdings. The sale included The Spencer Daily Reporter, Northwest Iowa Shopper, Storm Lake Pilot-Tribune, Buena Vista County Shopper, Dickinson County News and Okobojian. In a separate transaction, Rust purchased the Linton Daily Citizen in Indiana. Also in 2003, Gary Rust was inducted into the Missouri Press Association's Newspaper Hall of Fame.

Rust bought the Fort Scott Tribune in 2004, and the Monett Times in 2009. In August 2010, Rust COO Walter "Wally" Lage slipped off a pier and drowned to death in Maine. He was 66. The following month the company elevated three of its publishers to new roles as regional vice-presidents.

In January 2022, the company's co-president Rex Rust died. He was 52. At that time Rust Communications owned 40 newspapers in eight states, numerous magazines and websites, and had minority ownership of 17 radio stations.

In February 2022, Rust Communications sold nine newspapers to CherryRoad Media. The sale included four newspapers in Missouri: Marshall Democrat-News, Monett Times, Cassville Democrat and South Missourian News in Thayer. Also sold were five newspapers in Arkansas: Carroll County News in Berryville, Lovely County Citizen in Eureka Springs, The News in Salem, Villager Journal in Cherokee Village and Clay County Times-Democrat in Piggott.

In April 2022, Rust Communications sold the Le Mars Daily Sentinel, Cherokee Chronicle Times, Spencer Daily Reporter, all in Iowa, to Gene Hall and his son Chris.

In June 2024, Rust Communications sold its Indiana newspapers to Paxton Media Group. The sale included The Brazil Times, Greencastle Banner-Graphic and Greene County Daily World. The Dyersburg State Gazette in Tennessee was also sold to Paxton.

In January 2025, company founder Gary Rust died. He was 89.

== Newspapers ==
Holdings of Rust Communications include the following newspapers:

=== Arkansas ===
- Blytheville Courier News

=== Idaho ===
- Mountain Home News
- Glenns Ferry Gazette
- The Patriot

=== Kansas ===
- Fort Scott Tribune

=== Missouri ===
- Daily American Republic
- Delta Dunkin Democrat
- Dexter Statesman
- Southeast Missourian
- Marble Hill Banner Press
- Nevada Daily Mail
- Pemiscot Press
- Prospect News
- Sikeston Standard-Democrat

=== Nebraska ===
- McCook Daily Gazette
