= Fort Scott Tribune =

Newspaper in Fort Scott, Kansas

- Type: Daily newspaper
- Owner(s): Rust Communications
- Publisher: Lorie Harter
- Editor: Tammy Helm
- Founded: 1884
- Language: English
- Headquarters: 22 N. Main, Fort Scott, KS, 66701
- Circulation: 1,457
- Website: fstribune.com

The Fort Scott Tribune is a daily newspaper serving Fort Scott, Kansas, United States. It has been owned by Rust Communications since 2004.

== History ==
The Fort Scott Banner began publication in 1882, and the same group began publication of the Fort Scott Tribune as a daily on October 1, 1884, with J.B. Chapman as its first editor. George Marble Sr. (b. 1870, d. March 15, 1930), who began working for the paper in 1885 (when he was 15), first acquired an interest in the paper in 1896, which he increased over time, becoming publisher and president in 1902. In 1904, the paper merged with the Fort Scott Monitor (which had been founded in Maramton in 1862 and moved to Fort Scott in 1863). The Tribune also acquired two other papers in its early days—the Fort Scott News (founded 1889), which it acquired in 1900; and The Republican (founded 1902) in 1916.

When Marble Sr. died in 1930, George Marble Jr. (d. June 18, 1972) took over as publisher, and remained in that position until 1972 when he died of a reaction to a bee sting. His widow Sally Marble (d. 1982) then served as publisher from 1972 to 1979. In 1979, George Jr. and Sally's daughter Sara, and her husband Frank Emery took over the paper. Emery became sole owner in 1987. It remained in Emery's hands until he sold to Rust Communications in 2004.

== See also ==
- List of newspapers in Kansas
