= McCook Gazette =

Newspaper published in McCook, US

Coordinates: 40.202457°N 100.626935°W

McCook Daily Gazette
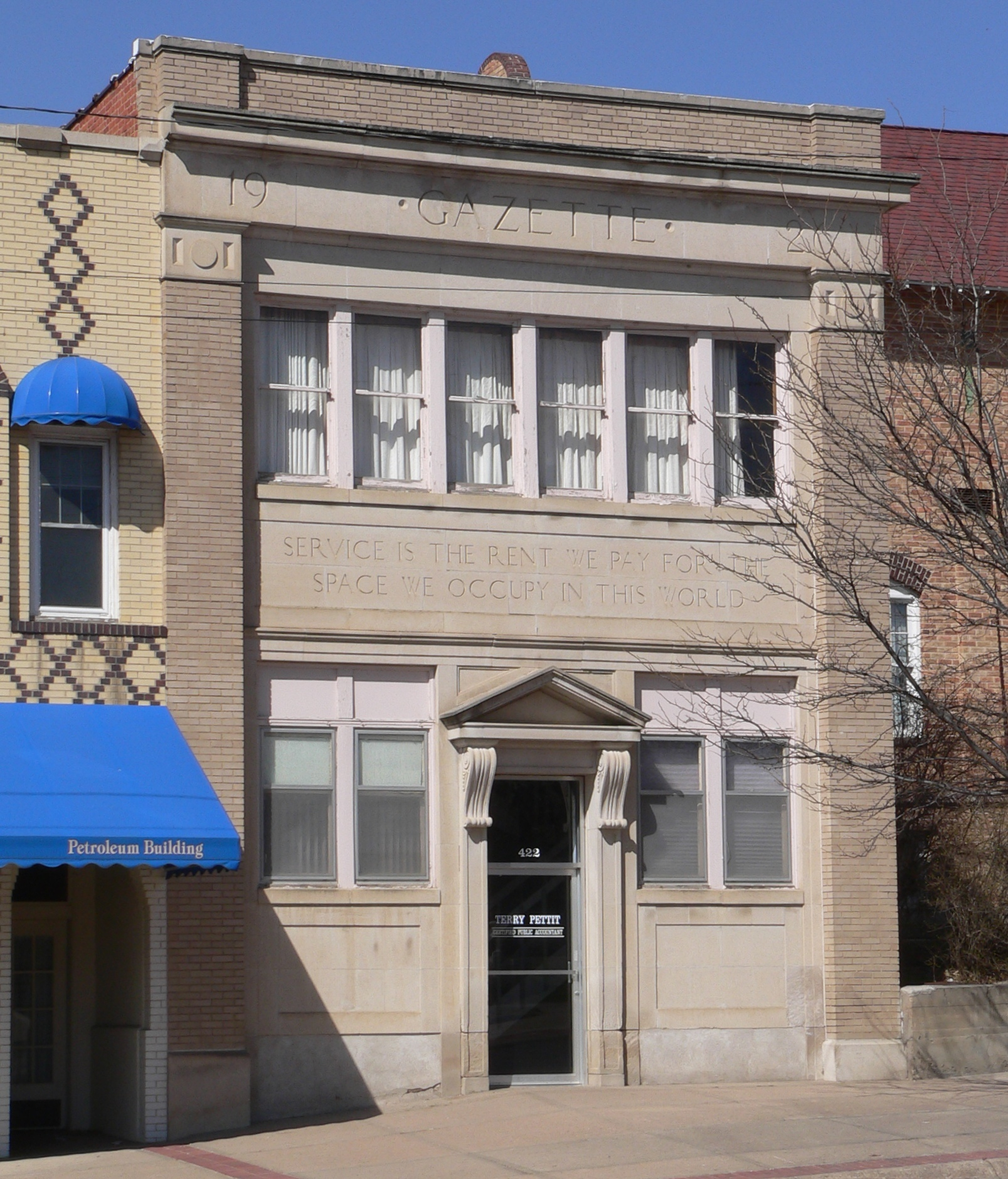
- 1926 Gazette building
- Type: Daily newspaper
- Format: Broadsheet
- Owner: Rust Communications
- Founder: Harry D. Strunk
- Publisher: Shary Skiles
- Editor: Bruce Crosby
- Founded: 1911 (as Red Willow Gazette)
- Language: American English
- Headquarters: W. First and E Streets; McCook, Nebraska 69001
- Country: United States
- Circulation: 4,564 (as of 2011)
- ISSN: 2835-3897
- OCLC number: 31304135
- Website: mccookgazette.com

The McCook Daily Gazette is a newspaper published in the city of McCook, in the southwestern part of the state of Nebraska, in the Great Plains region of the United States. It serves southwestern Nebraska and northwestern Kansas. The newspaper is issued five days a week, Monday through Friday afternoons. As of 2011, it had a circulation of 4,564.

The paper was founded in 1911 by Harry D. Strunk and Burris H. Stewart as the Red Willow Gazette. Thirteen years later, under Strunk's editorship, it became a daily and changed its name to the McCook Daily Gazette. In 1929, the newspaper became one of the first in the world to be delivered regularly by air: for several months its airplane, the Newsboy, flew a daily route, dropping bundles of newspapers to carriers in outlying towns. An image of the Newsboy still decorates the paper's nameplate.

Strunk published the Gazette until his death in 1960, when he was succeeded by his son Allen Strunk. In 1986, the paper was acquired by Gozia-Driver Media, which was later re-incorporated as US Media Group. In 1997, the Gazette was sold to Rust Communications.

== History ==
The paper's founder, Harry D. Strunk, was born in 1892 in Pawnee City, Nebraska. In 1906, at the age of 14, he was forced by family circumstances to quit school and go to work as a printer's devil (an apprentice) for the Pawnee City Republican. A year later, he moved to Fairbury, Nebraska, but at the age of 16, when the editor of the Republican fell ill, he returned to Pawnee City and published the newspaper for three months until the editor's recovery. Strunk continued to move from newspaper to newspaper; in 1909, at the age of 17, he was shop foreman of the Norton, Kansas Daily Telegram, (Note: Walt Sehnert gives the name of the Norton, Kansas paper as the Daily Telegraph; other sources, including Sehnert (2007), suggest that this is an error.) overseeing ten typesetters.

Location of McCook within Nebraska

Later in 1909, Strunk set off for the West Coast. En route, he saw and responded to an advertisement seeking a printer for the weekly McCook Tribune. Nine months later, he and fellow Tribune employee Burris H. Stewart started their own job-printing shop, (Note: "Job printing" is the commercial printing of items for individuals or businesses: for example, the production of handbills, letterhead, envelopes, business forms, event programs, etc.) "with so few assets that they were forced to borrow money to buy ink". Six months later, in 1911, the two launched their own newspaper: the semi-weekly Red Willow Gazette, (Note: McCook is the county seat of Red Willow County.) again with no assets and with heavy debts. Distressed by their financial situation, Stewart committed suicide on the day of the paper's second issue.

Strunk persevered, and the paper proved successful. In 1914, it acquired a Linotype, the first between Hastings, Nebraska and Denver, Colorado; McCook became the smallest city in Nebraska to possess one. In 1924, the paper changed its name to the present McCook Daily Gazette and began daily publication; again, McCook became the smallest city in Nebraska with a daily newspaper. In 1926, the operation moved to a new building on Main Street, its facade inscribed with the paper's motto: "Service is the rent we pay for the space we occupy in this world."

== The Newsboy ==
In the 1920s, the spread of the automobile and the improvement of roads in the United States made it easier for rural residents to do their shopping in larger towns farther from their homes. This gave merchants an incentive to advertise in newspapers that reached such residents. However, delivering the papers in a timely fashion became a problem for the publishers. The U.S. Mail was expensive, since postage rates for newspapers had been raised drastically by the War Revenue Act of 1917; it also took several days for the papers to reach some customers. In more developed parts of the country, publishers delivered papers by truck to local carriers in outlying towns. However, the improvement of roads in the McCook area was slower than in more densely populated areas. By 1929, U.S. Highway 38 (now U.S. Highway 6) had not yet been fully gravelled in southwestern Nebraska, and most roads off the main highways were impassable in bad weather.

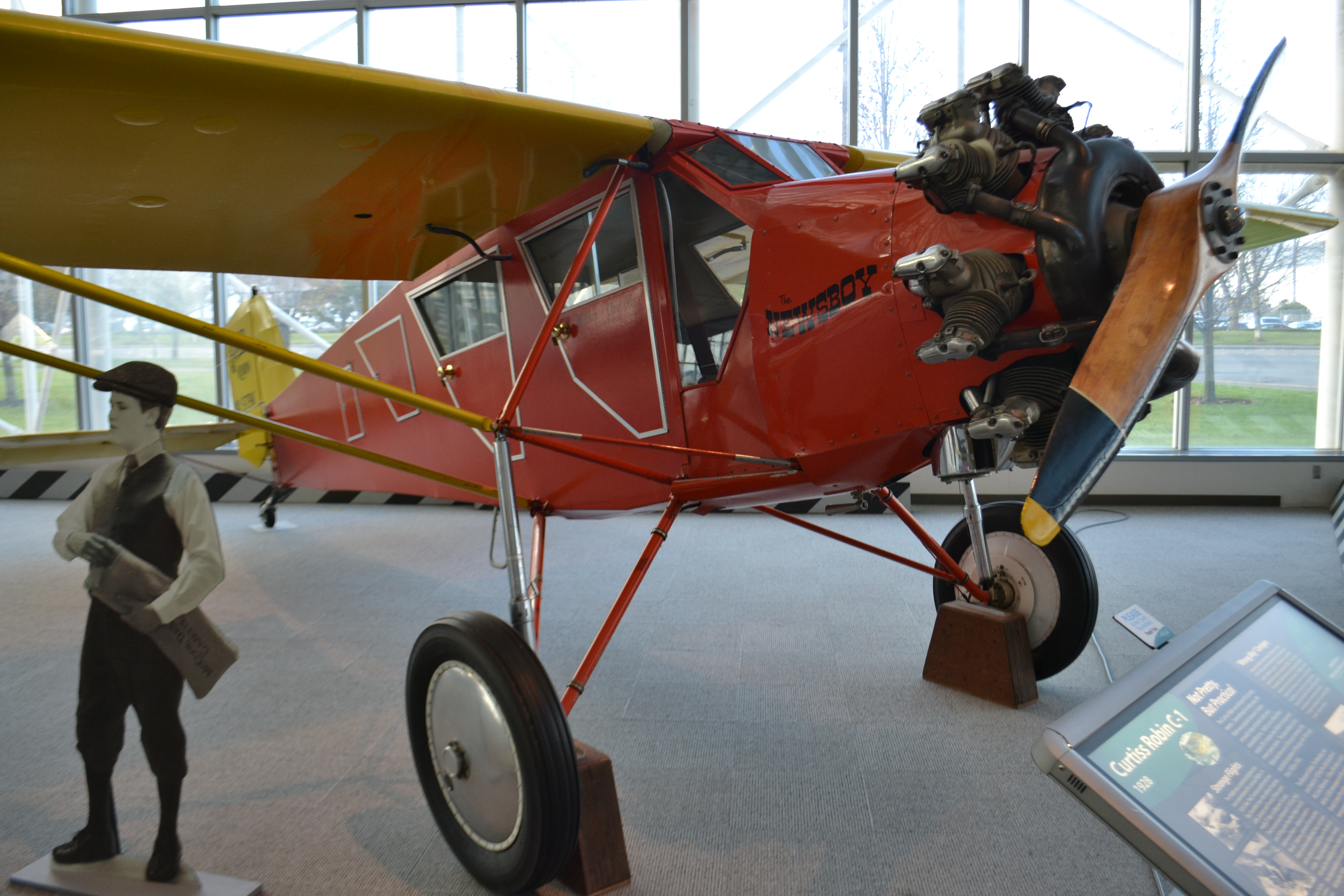
The Newsboy, displayed in the Seattle Museum of Flight

Strunk's solution was to go by air. In 1929, he paid $8,000 for a Curtiss Robin C1 two-seater monoplane, christened the Newsboy. On September 13, 1929, air delivery began. The Newsboy flew a nonstop three-hour route covering 389 miles (626 km), passing over more than 40 communities in southwestern Nebraska and northwestern Kansas. At each town, a bundle of papers was dropped from a height of 500 feet (150 m) onto a prearranged field, where it was picked up by local carriers. Papers were delivered as far west as Benkelman, Nebraska, 54 miles (87 km) from McCook; east to Orleans, Nebraska, 73 miles (117 km) away; and south to Atwood, Kansas, 50 miles (80 km) distant.

Beside delivering papers to far-flung communities, the Newsboy served to promote the Gazette. Interest in aviation was still strong after Charles Lindbergh's celebrated 1927 solo flight from New York to Paris. The newspaper offered a ride in the airplane to every two-year subscriber. It also opened a flying school: the pilot of the Newsboy would give flying lessons in the morning, then deliver the day's papers in the afternoon. To emphasize the newspaper's connection with aviation, a new nameplate was introduced, with wings behind the name and airplanes on either side. Whether or not because of the airplane, the circulation of the Gazette increased from 2800 in 1928 to 4500 in 1930.

Delivery by air lasted for less than a year. In May 1930, (Note: Sources differ on the date of the windstorm that took the Newsboy out of service. May 1930 is the date given by Connie Jo Discoe; she then quotes a "mid-June 1930" article by Strunk about the plane's retirement. Liz Watts gives a date of July 1930 for the storm, citing a 1987 letter from Allen Strunk. Since Discoe uses a contemporary source directly, her date is used in this article.) the Newsboy was damaged by high winds while parked at the McCook airport. Strunk opted not to repair it and return it to service, citing "week after week of inclement weather, during which time we have found it impossible to fly our route on schedule". The airplane was not yet built, he wrote, that could "fly successfully in rain, wind, sleet, snow and fog."

A few major metropolitan newspapers had made short-term experiments with air delivery in 1928 and 1929. However, the months-long effort by the Gazette made it the first newspaper to conduct regular deliveries by air.

After the Newsboy was taken out of service, it was sold and restored several times. In 1972, it was placed on display at the Museum of Flight in Seattle.

== 1930–1960 ==
The end of the aviation experiment forced the Gazette to return to ground-based delivery. Newspapers for outlying communities were transported there on commercial buses running through McCook; local carriers picked them up at their towns' bus stops. Same-day delivery was no longer possible for subscribers in communities off the main highways; they had to settle for next-day delivery.

In 1934, the Gazette absorbed the South Side Sentinel of Marion, Nebraska. In 1936, it acquired the triweekly McCook Tribune, at which Strunk had worked on his arrival in McCook. Later, in 1957, it absorbed the Red Willow County Reporter.

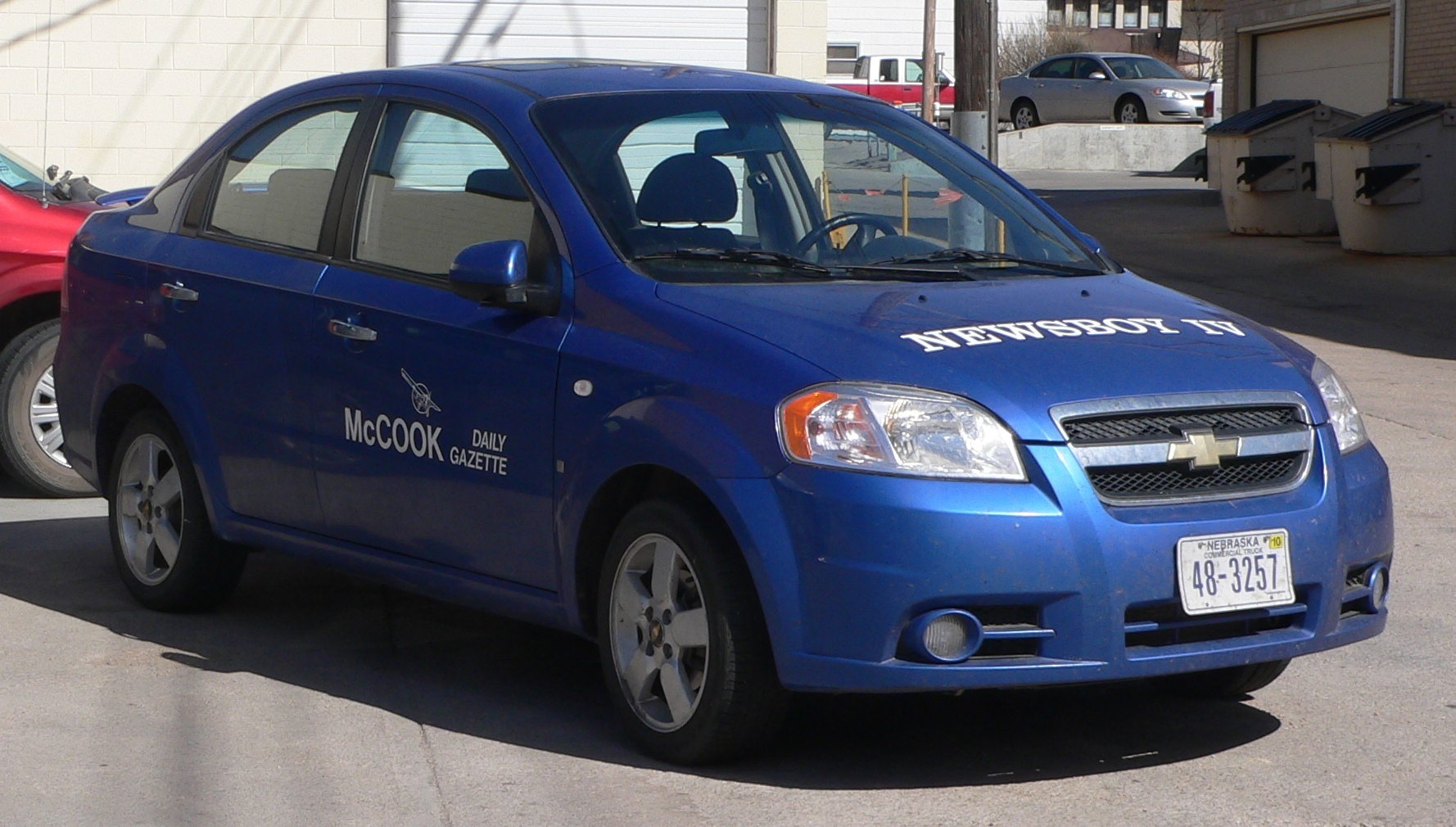
A Newsboy in 2011

On the eve of World War II, the Gazette acquired one of the last teletypesetters manufactured. With this machine, the paper could be produced with only two printers; this allowed it to remain in production at a time when Linotype operators were in short supply because of the war.

The Gazette made a second attempt at air delivery in 1950. For four years, a Cessna 120 was used to deliver papers to outlying communities. The high cost of operating the airplane, and the increasing availability of good roads for ground delivery, ended the venture. The plane was replaced by a fleet of small trucks and automobiles, all of which continued to bear the name Newsboy.

After the Republican River flood of 1935, the U.S. Army Corps of Engineers conducted a study of the river's watershed. Released in 1940, it concluded that there were no good dam sites upstream from Republican City, Nebraska, where the Harlan County Dam is now located. Since 112 deaths and the bulk of the property damage caused by the flood had occurred in the upper Republican valley, which includes McCook, the report led to dissatisfaction among residents of the area. Strunk and three others formed the Republican Valley Conservation Association, which lobbied aggressively for the development of a flood-control program for the entire basin; the Gazette provided office space to the organization. The RVCA's efforts led to the construction of a number of dams in the area: one on the Republican at Trenton, Nebraska, and several on tributaries of the river in Nebraska and Kansas. One of the latter was built on Medicine Creek in Frontier County, Nebraska; the 1,850-acre (750 ha) reservoir behind it has been named Harry Strunk Lake.

== After 1960 ==
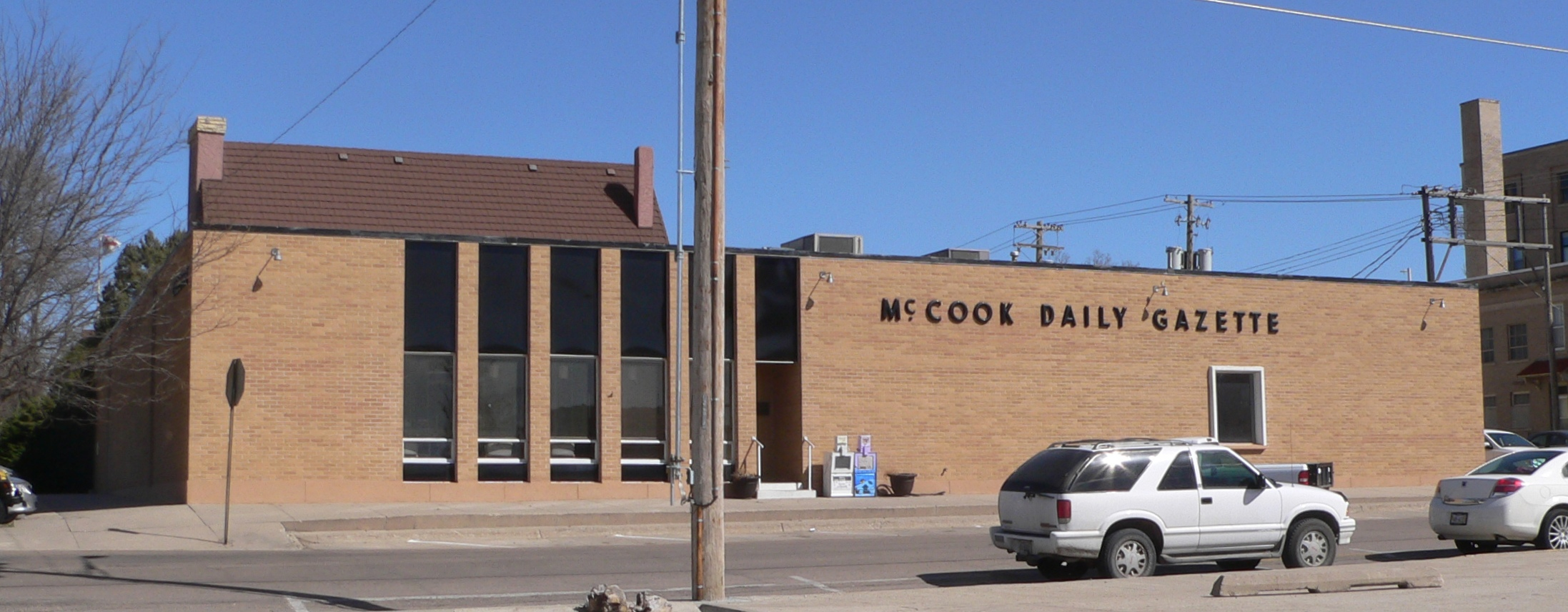
Gazette building, 2011

Harry Strunk published the Gazette until his death in 1960, after which his son Allen Strunk succeeded him. Under Allen Strunk, the newspaper made the conversion from letterpress to offset printing.

At the end of 1986, the Strunk family sold the newspaper to Gozia-Driver Media, which was later re-incorporated as US Media Group. Allen Strunk was succeeded as publisher by Dick Gozia and John Burgess, who occupied the position from 1987 to 1990, followed by Gene Morris, who became publisher in 1990.

In 1997, the Gazette was acquired by Rust Communications. In 2002, it launched a weekly shopper, the "Big Nickel", inserted in the Friday newspaper and distributed free from racks throughout the newspaper's circulation area.

Upon Gene Morris's retirement in 2007, general manager Shary Skiles was named publisher. In 2009, the newspaper ended Saturday publication, moving to a schedule of five issues a week, released on Monday through Friday afternoons.

The circulation of the Gazette has declined in the 21st century. In 2001, the Nebraska Press Association listed it as 6,709. In 2005, a report by the Knight Foundation gave it as "approximately 5,903". In 2011, the Nebraska Press Association's website listed the number as 4,564.
