= Dyersburg State Gazette =

Semi-weekly newspaper in Dyersburg, Tennessee

State Gazette
- Type: Semi-weekly newspaper
- Format: Broadsheet
- Owner: Paxton Media Group
- Publisher: Reece Terry
- Advertising Manager: Cecily Simpson
- Founded: 1865; 161 years ago
- Political alignment: Non-partisan
- Headquarters: 114 West Court Street; Dyersburg, Tennessee 38024
- Circulation: 1,200
- Website: stategazette.com

The State Gazette is a semi-weekly newspaper published in Dyersburg, Tennessee. The paper has served Dyersburg and Northwest Tennessee since 1865, and provides general news.

== History ==
The Dyersburg State Gazette was purchased by Worrell Newspapers of Charlottesville, Virginia in 1971. The New York Times Company acquired eight daily papers, including the Dyersburg State Gazette, from Worrell in 1982. Paxton Media Group purchased it from The New York Times Company in 1995. Rust Communications acquired the State Gazette in 2000. Rust sold the newspaper back to Paxton in 2024.
