= Cassville Republican =

Newspaper in Missouri, US

- Type: Weekly newspaper
- Format: Broadsheet
- Owner(s): W.L. and Lillian Ennis Townsley
- Founded: 1872
- Ceased publication: May 2, 1984

The Cassville Republican was a weekly newspaper in the town of Cassville, Missouri, the county seat of Barry County, Missouri. The newspaper was founded in 1872 and ceased operation in 1984, after 112 years of operation. The newspaper was established to provide the Republican Party viewpoint to counter the Cassville Democrat, which had been established a year prior. For its entire history, it competed with the Cassville Democrat and then with the 1967 establishment of the Barry County Advertiser, Cassville, with a population of less than 3,000, became home to three publications all competing for limited advertising revenue. Of the three, only the Cassville Republican folded, with both the Cassville Democrat and the Barry County Advertiser continuing to this day.

== Editors & Publishers ==
George E. Harris (1862-1953) served as editor of the Cassville Republican in the 1880s and 1890s and oversaw a period when the paper was at its most political. Harris chided Democrats, Populists and a coalition party with the name "Demopops" (or "Popocratsy") and ridiculed the opposition with mock prayers that he asserted were uttered at their meetings.

In 1908, Elihu Newton Meador (1878-1959) purchased the Cassville Republican and went on to serve as editor and publisher for 41 years. In addition, Meador also served as the mayor of Cassville and president of the Cassville school board.

In December 1949, Meador sold the Cassville Republican to Emory Melton, who was then the prosecuting attorney of Barry County and later a state senator, and Wayne Ennis, who was a linotype operator for the paper. When Wayne Ennis died in 1963, his wife, Lillian, purchased Melton's half of the business and became editor and publisher, during which time she also served as secretary for the Missouri Press Association. In 1978 she married W.L. Townsley and together they published the newspaper until their retirement in 1984, when they permanently folded the paper, with the last issue being produced on May 2, 1984.
