= Monett Times =

Local newspaper in Missouri, US (1899–2024)

The Monett Times
- Type: Weekly newspaper
- Format: Broadsheet
- Owner(s): Lisa Craft
- Founded: 1899
- Language: English
- Ceased publication: 2024
- City: Monett, Missouri
- ISSN: 2835-4540
- OCLC number: 13650671
- Website: monett-times.com

The Monett Times was a weekly newspaper in Monett, Missouri, a small city of around 9,000 people that falls into both northern Barry County and southern Lawrence County. The main focus of the publication was on local news, but it did include some state, national and international stories. The Monett Times was most recently published on Wednesdays, and had a circulation of around 3,300. It ceased publication on June 25, 2024, merging into the Lawrence County Record.

== History ==
The Monett Times was founded in 1899 by David Alanzo Peters. He was publisher of the newspaper until his death in 1917, at which time his daughter Pearl Myra Peters took over. During her tenure as publisher and editor, Pearl Peters had a new building constructed at 212 5th St. in Monett and had it outfitted with modern publishing equipment. Pearl Peters served as editor and publisher of the newspaper until retiring and selling it to Menzo Forest Hainline in 1939.

Hainline was the sole owner and publisher of the Monett Times until January 1, 1942, when Ken Meuser purchased a share of that paper, along with a share in the Lawrence County Record in Mount Vernon, Missouri, and the two men became co-publishers of both papers. In March 1943, he bought Hainline's interest in the Times and sold his interest in the Lawrence County Record to Hainline. Meuser and his wife, Mary, then became co-owners of the Monett Times. In 1945, he purchased the Monett Printing Company, which he operated in connection with the Monett Times, until August 1972, when he sold both to Walls Newspapers, Inc. of Montgomery, Alabama. Jim McGinnis became publisher of the paper under Walls Newspapers ownership and remained in that role until 1976 when Dick Brady, who had served as editor of the paper under Meuser's ownership, was named publisher. Brady remained publisher until retiring in 1989.

In March 2009, Rust Communications, a Cape Girardeau, Missouri media company, purchased the Monett Times from Cleveland Newspapers, Inc., a subsidiary of Walls Newspapers. Rust Publishing already owned the Cassville Democrat in neighboring Cassville, Missouri. Lisa Schlichtman, editor of the Cassville Democrat, was named editor of the Monett Times and Murray Bishoff was kept as managing editor. Lisa Schlichtman and her husband, Mike, also hold a minority ownership in the Monett Times.

In February 2021, Rust Communications sold the Monett Times to CherryRoad Media. Ten months later the paper was sold again to Lisa Craft. The paper switched from daily to weekly publication in February 2023, deceasing the number of print edition days from five to one a week.

In June 2024, Craft sold the Monett Times to Ryan Squibb, who announced the newspaper will be merged into the Lawrence County Record. The paper's office will also be closed. Craft, who had worked at the paper for 35 years, wrote that part of the motivation for the sale was the sudden death of her husband Max a year prior.
