= Southeast Missourian =

Newspaper in Cape Girardeau, Missouri

The Southeast Missourian
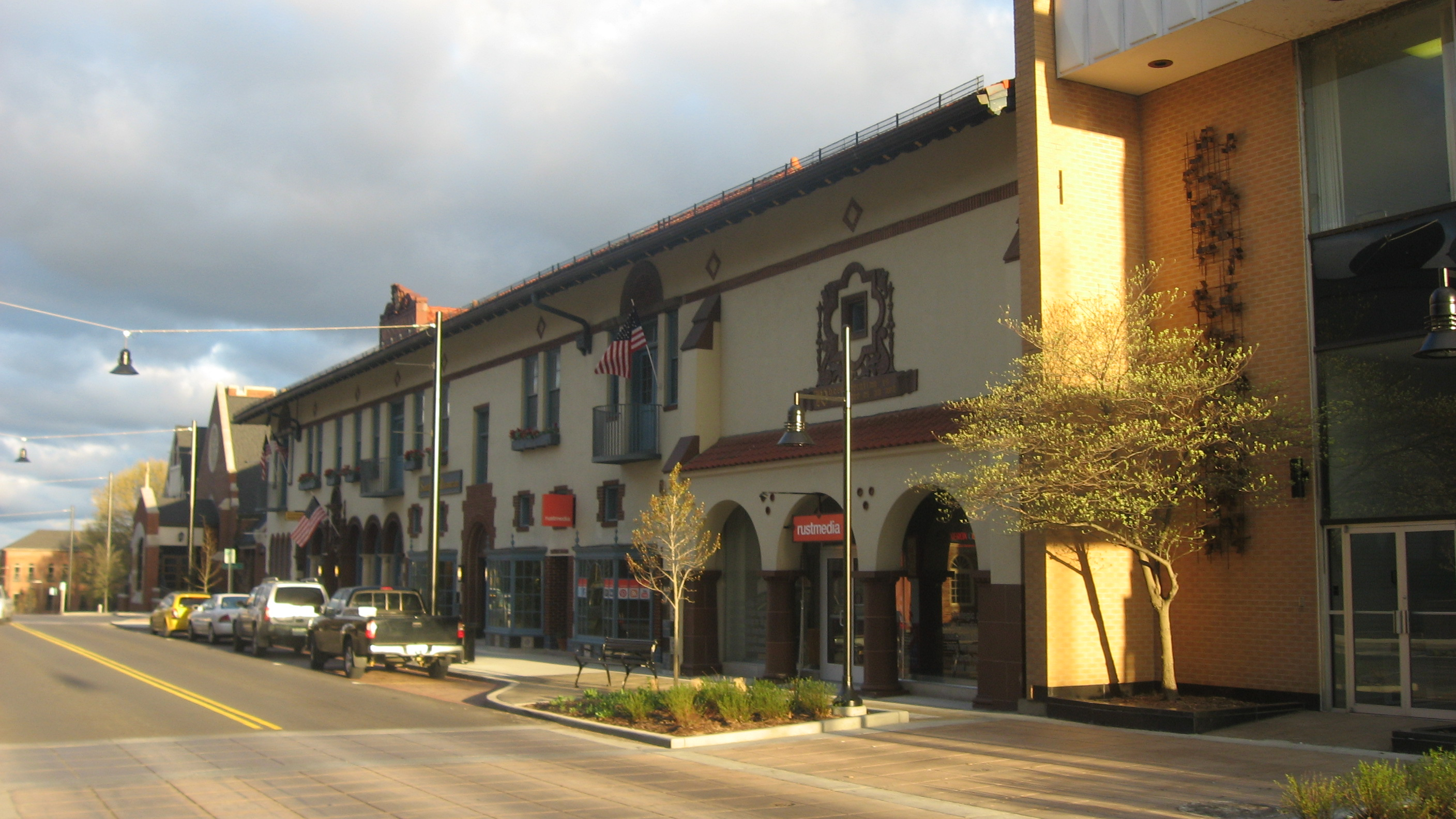
- Headquarters
- Owner: Rust Communications
- Publisher: Jon K. Rust
- Founded: 1904
- Language: English
- Headquarters: 301 Broadway, P.O. Box 699, Cape Girardeau, MO 63702
- Circulation: 7,000 (Daily); 9,000 (Sunday)
- ISSN: 0746-4452 (print); 2641-1210 (web)
- OCLC number: 10049209
- Website: semissourian.com

The Southeast Missourian is a 3-day per week newspaper published in Cape Girardeau, Missouri, and serves (as the name implies) the southeastern portion of Missouri.

== History ==
The paper began publication on October 3, 1904, as The Daily Republican. Brothers George (b. May 14, 1869, d. 1956) and Fred Naeter (b. Jan. 8, 1874, d. Sept. 18, 1965) of St. Louis purchased a defunct paper of that name after visiting the town in September 1904 and revived it. The paper changed its name to the Southeast Missourian in 1918.

When Fred Naeter died in 1965, the Naeters' nephew, Harry A. Naeter, Jr. (b. June 9, 1917, d. Feb. 16, 1994) (whose father had also worked with the Naeter brothers on the paper but died in 1918—it was Harry Sr. that championed the 1918 name change before his death), became publisher. In late 1976, the paper was sold to Thomson Newspapers. It was then purchased by Gary Rust in 1986, and continues to be owned by Rust Communications. With the Southeast Missourian as its flagship publication, as of 2009, family-owned Rust Communications had full or part ownership of 18 daily papers, 30 weekly papers, and 17 radio stations in eight states.

The Southeast Missourian Building was listed on the National Register of Historic Places in 2005.

== Earlier paper ==
An earlier paper which went by the name Southeast Missourian was founded in 1895 by W.W. Wright in New Madrid, Missouri.
