= Southeast Missourian Building =

- U.S. National Register of Historic Places
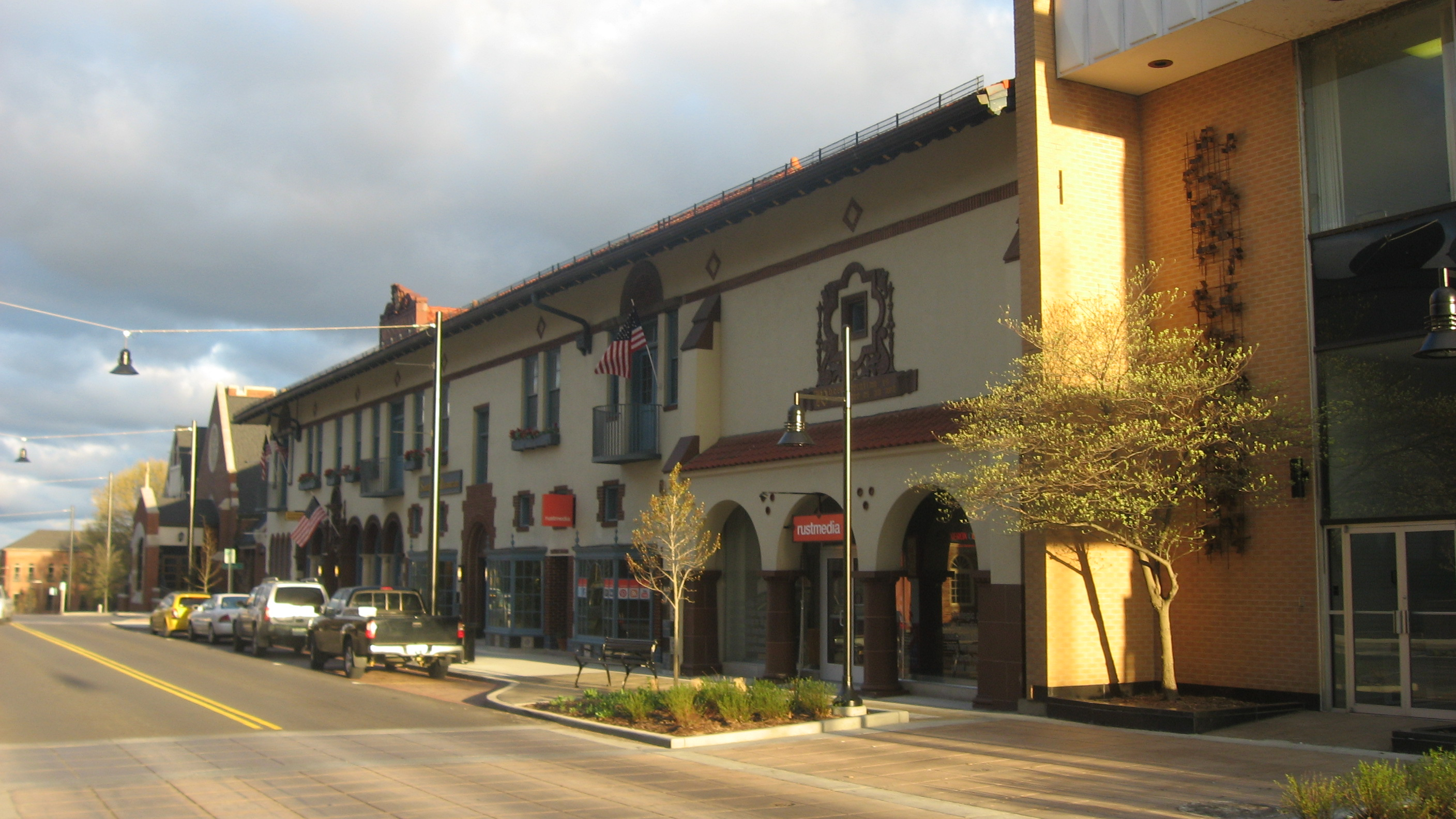
- Southeast Missourian Building, April 2013

- Location within Missouri Location within the United States
- Location: 301 Broadway, Cape Girardeau, Missouri
- Coordinates: 37°18′28″N 89°31′16″W
- Area: less than one acre
- Built: 1924-1925
- Built by: Gerhardt, J.W.
- Architect: Barnett, T.P.
- Architectural style: Mission/spanish Revival
- MPS: Cape Girardeau, Missouri MPS
- NRHP reference No.: 05000509
- Added to NRHP: June 1, 2005

Southeast Missourian Building is a historic commercial building located at Cape Girardeau, Missouri. It built in 1924–1925, and is a two-story, white stucco and red brick Mission Revival style building. It is a steel reinforced concrete building on a concrete foundation with a full basement and measures approximately 162 feet by 160 feet. The building houses the offices of the Southeast Missourian newspaper.

It was listed on the National Register of Historic Places in 2005.
