= Pam Johnson (editor) =

American journalist and editor (1946–2021)

- Born: Pamela Jean Eliason; November 14, 1946; Carthage, Missouri, U.S.
- Died: January 20, 2021 (aged 74)
- Education: Missouri Southern State University; University of Missouri
- Occupations: Journalist, editor
- Writing career
- Language: English
- Notable awards: Pulitzer Prize in Journalism, 1982; Missouri Honor Medal for Distinguished Service in Journalism (2000)

Pam Johnson (November 14, 1946 — January 20, 2021) was the first woman to serve as managing editor of The Arizona Republic, the 15th largest newspaper in the U.S. and the largest newspaper in Arizona. She was also the first female managing editor of The Republic's sister newspaper, The Phoenix Gazette. In addition to her newspaper management career, Johnson worked at the Poynter Institute for Media Studies in Florida and then as executive director of the Donald W. Reynolds Journalism Institute at the University of Missouri's School of Journalism, starting in 2004. Johnson, who died in January 2021, graduated from Missouri School of Journalism in 1969 with a bachelor's degree.

Johnson and reporters from the Kansas City Star and the Kansas City Times were awarded a Pulitzer Prize for team coverage of the Hyatt Regency walkway collapse in 1982.
