= Arrell Gibson =

American historian (1921–1987)

Arrell Morgan Gibson (1921–1987) was a historian and author specializing in the history of the state of Oklahoma.

Gibson was born in Pleasanton, Kansas on December 1, 1921. He earned degrees from Missouri Southern State College and the University of Oklahoma. He is best known for writing Oklahoma: A History of Five Centuries (University of Oklahoma Press 1965, 1981) and The Oklahoma Story (University of Oklahoma Press 1978). He died in Norman, Oklahoma on November 30, 1987. There have been two literary awards created in Gibson's honor. The Oklahoma Center For The Book grants its Arrell Gibson Lifetime Achievement Award annually to an Oklahoman for a body of literary work. The Indian Territory Posse of Westerners International awards a $500 cash prize annually to the year's best essay on the history of Native Americans.

== Academic career ==
He received his B.A. from Missouri Southern State College in 1946, his M.A. from University of Oklahoma in 1948 and his Ph.D. from University of Oklahoma in 1954.

He was Professor of History and Government at Phillips University, Enid, Oklahoma – 1949–1957. He was the George Lynn Cross Research Professor of History at University of Oklahoma – 1957–?

He was Curator: Western History Collections at University of Oklahoma – 1957–1970. Curator: Sam Noble Oklahoma Museum of Natural History (then called the Stovall Museum) at University of Oklahoma – 1960–1987.

He was visiting professor at University of New Mexico in 1975 He was visiting distinguished professor; Graduate Studies Consultant – University of South China – 1985. He was Goldwater Distinguished Professor of American Institutions – Arizona State University – 1986

== Honors ==
- Research Grant – American Philosophical Society
- Research Grant – Duke Foundation
- Research Grant – University of Oklahoma
- Rockefeller Foundation Award
- Oklahoma Writer of the Year Award from the University of Oklahoma School of Journalism
- American Association for State and Local History Award of Merit for his book Wilderness Bonanza
- Oklahoma Hall of Fame Award
- University of Oklahoma's Distinguished Citation Award
- Honorary Doctorate – University of South China
- Honorary Doctorate – College of Idaho
- Board Member – Oklahoma Historical Society
- Board Member – Museum of the Great Plains
- Board Member – Mississippi Choctaw Cultural Center
- First President – Oklahoma Center for the Book
- President Elect – Western History Association

== Books ==
- The Kickapoos (1963)
- The Life and Death of Colonel Albert Jennings Fountain (1965)
- Oklahoma: A History of Five Centuries (1965)
- The Chickasaws (1971) which placed second for a Pulitzer Prize online
- Wilderness Bonanza (1972)
- The West in the Life of the Nation (1976) online
- The Oklahoma Story (1978)
- The American Indian: Pre-History to the Present (1980) online
- The Santa Fe and Taos Colonies: Age of the Muses 1900–1942 (1983)
- editor – The West Wind Blows: The Autobiography of Edward Everett Dale (1984)
- editor – Between Two Worlds: The Survival of Twentieth Century Indians (1986)
- Yankees in paradise : the Pacific Basin frontier (1993) ed. by John Whitehead online
