= Emory Melton =

American politician

Member of the Missouri Senate from the 31st district
- In office 1972–1996

Personal details
- Born: June 10, 1923 McDowell Township, Barry County, Missouri
- Died: December 26, 2015 (aged 92) Cassville, Missouri
- Party: Republican
- Education: University of Missouri
- Occupation: attorney

Emory Melton (June 20, 1923 – December 26, 2015) was an American politician who served in the Missouri State Senate. He was born in McDowell, Missouri and attended Southwest Missouri State University and the University of Missouri in Columbia, studying law. He served in the Missouri State Senate for the 29th district 1972 to 1996. He was a member of the Republican party. Melton died on December 26, 2015, at his home in Cassville, Missouri. He founded and owned the former Barry County Advertiser newspaper until his death.
