= Barry County Advertiser =

Newspaper in Missouri, U.S.

- Type: Weekly newspaper
- Format: Broadsheet
- Editor: Ezra DeVore
- General manager: Matthew Willis
- Founded: 1967
- Ceased publication: July 2026
- Headquarters: 904 West St, Cassville, MO 65625
- Circulation: 13,627 weekly
- Website: http://www.4bcaonline.com/

The Barry County Advertiser was a free weekly newspaper located in Cassville, Missouri, the county seat of Barry County, Missouri. The Advertiser was funded purely by advertising and distributed through the U.S. Postal Service. Its distribution at one time reached 13,500 homes across Barry County, and focused on local news.

The first issue of the Advertiser was published on December 13, 1967, and was at that time one of three weekly papers in Cassville, a town with a population of 3,206 as of the 2020 census, but less than 3,000 at the time. Both of the existing papers, the Cassville Democrat and the Cassville Republican, had been in existence for nearly a century at that time, but in 1984, the 112-year-old Cassville Republican folded. The Advertiser and the Cassville Democrat both continued to be publish until July 2026, when the Advertiser ceased operations. The nearby Branson Tri-Lakes News and Stone County Republican newspapers were also folded at the same time, all being owned by Lancaster Management Incorporated (LMI) based in Gadsden, Alabama.

The paper was owned and founded by the late Missouri State Senator Emory Melton and his wife, Jean. Emory Melton owned it until his death in 2015 and later owned by their son, Stan Melton, who sold it to LMI.
