= Missouri Southern State University =

Public university in Joplin, Missouri, U.S.

- Former names: Joplin Junior College (1937–1977); Missouri Southern State College (1977–2003); Missouri Southern State University–Joplin (2003–2005)
- Type: Public university
- Established: 1937
- President: Dean Van Galen
- Provost: Lisa Toms
- Students: 4,087 (Fall 2023)
- Location: Joplin, Missouri, U.S. 37°05′45″N 94°27′44″W
- Campus: Urban, 373 acres (1.51 km^{2})
- Colors: Green and gold
- Nickname: Lions
- Sporting affiliations: NCAA Division II – The MIAA
- Mascot: Roary the Lion
- Website: www.mssu.edu

Missouri Southern State University (Missouri Southern, MSSU, or MoSo) is a public university in Joplin, Missouri. It was established in 1937 as Joplin Junior College. The university enrolled 4,087 students in Fall 2023.

== History ==
Missouri Southern State University was founded in 1937 as Joplin Junior College. At its conception, Joplin Junior College had 114 students and only 9 faculty members. In 1964, residents of Jasper County, Missouri approved a $2.5 million bond issue to begin construction on a new campus, where the university is currently located. The new campus opened in the fall of 1967 with 2,399 students and 95 faculty members. In 1977, the school was renamed Missouri Southern State College and officially became a state-assisted four-year college and part of the state of Missouri's higher education system. In 2003, the Missouri General Assembly authorized the renaming of the college to Missouri Southern State University - Joplin; in 2005 the university dropped Joplin from its name.

In 1967, the campus was home to six buildings. The Taylor Performing Arts center was completed in 1973 and the Richard M. Webster Communications and Social Science Building opened in August 1992.

Missouri Southern recently finished construction on a health sciences building. The building, which had its groundbreaking on May 19, 2008, was built with money secured by MOHELA and distributed to MSSU by the state of Missouri. The Missouri General Assembly had entertained the addition of the Joplin Regional Center, owned by the Missouri Department of Mental Health, to Missouri Southern's campus in spring of 2009.

The school is about 30 blocks northeast of the worst of the devastation of the 2011 Joplin tornado which destroyed much of southern Joplin on May 22, 2011—one day after the school's graduation. Joplin High School had just completed its school graduation on the campus shortly before the tornado. The Leggett and Platt Athletic Center was used as an emergency shelter for victims. Billingsly Student Center was the headquarters for volunteer efforts run by Americorps St. Louis and was the coordination area for identifying victims and survivors. On May 29, 2011, Barack Obama, who was inspecting the damage, spoke at the Taylor Performing Arts Center.

=== Presidents ===
Missouri Southern has had seven presidents that have served since its beginning in 1967.

Title	Name	Dates
President	Leon C. Billingsly	1967–1978
President	Donald C. Darnton	1979–1982
President	Julio León	1982–2007
Interim President	Teri Agee	2007–2008
President	Bruce Speck	2008–2013
President	Alan Marble	2013–2020
President	Dean Van Galen	2020–present

== Campus ==
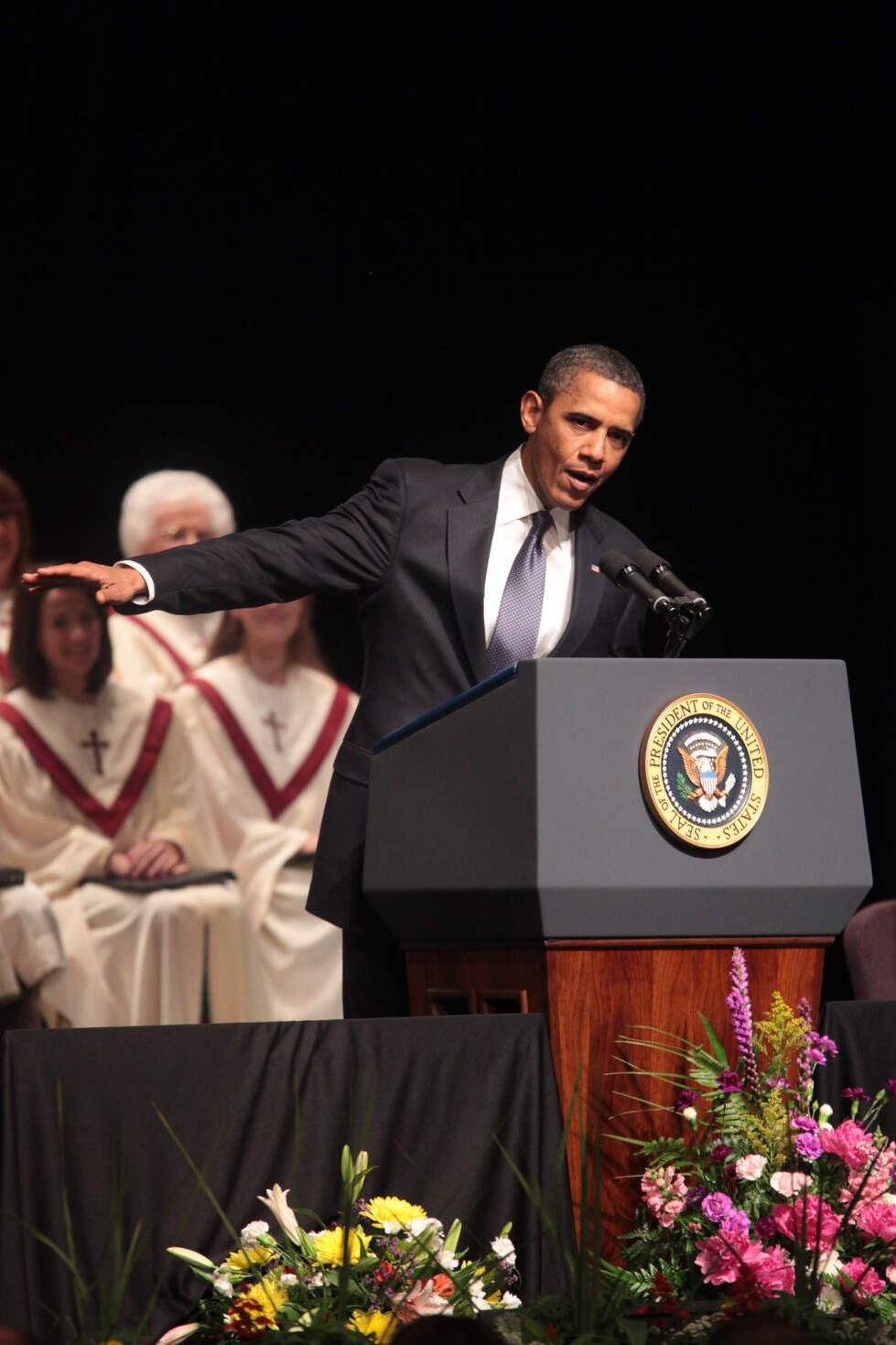
Barack Obama at Missouri Southern on May 29, 2011, during a memorial service for victims of the 2011 tornado.

The campus of Missouri Southern is cross divided by Duquesne Road (running north–south) and Newman Road (running east–west). The main portion of the campus is located west of Duquesne, though the football stadium and softball fields are on the east side of Duquesne.

=== Academic buildings ===
Spiva Library (opened in 1967) was the first building built on the current campus following the properties purchase for use by what was then Missouri Southern College. The library is named after prominent Joplin businessman George A. Spiva (1904–1967), who was a major donor and supporter of the school. Expansions to the library in 1972–1973 and 1999–2000 have tripled the size of the original structure. Prior to 1987, the social sciences department utilized some areas of the building for classrooms and offices.

Reynolds Hall (opened in 1967) is named after one of the original members of the school's board of regents, Lauren R. Reynolds (1916–1968). He served on the board from 1965 until his death. This building houses the biology and environmental health, chemical and physical sciences, and mathematics departments. On December 5, 2014, Missouri Gov. Jay Nixon announced that he would request more than $5.2 million in funding from the state legislature for renovations to the building. The funds will allow MSSU to renovate labs, classrooms and electrical systems.

Hearnes Hall (opened in 1967) is named after former Missouri Governor Warren E. Hearnes (1923–2009) who was governor at the time of the construction of the campus and signed the law which made Missouri Southern a state institution. Hearnes Hall is the university's administration building, but was previously home to English department (now located in Kuhn Hall) and the communications department (now located in Webster Hall). Hearnes Hall has never been expanded, but underwent major renovations ending in 2012.

Fine Arts Building (opened in 1967) is the home to the music and art departments. It is also home of the Spiva Gallery and is connected to both the Taylor Performing Arts Center and the Bud Walton Black Box Theatre.

Leon C. Billingsly Student Center (opened in 1969) is named after the first president of what was then Missouri Southern College, Leon C. Billingsly (1925–1978). Billingsly served in that capacity from 1964 until his death and supervised the construction of the original buildings on the campus. The building is home to the cafeteria, book store and Keystone and Connor ballrooms. Formerly known as the College Union, it was renamed for Billingsly in 1980, two years after his death. It has been expanded multiple times, the latest in 2009 when the George S. Beimdiek Recreation Center and Willcoxon Student Health Center were added onto it.

Kuhn Hall (opened in 1969) is named after John Raymond Kuhn (1902–1986) a Joplin area doctor who encouraged more practical application medical training at the college. It was originally home to the nursing (now in the Health Sciences Building) and computer science departments (now in Plaster Hall). Today it is home to the English department. The neighboring Kuhn Annex, which was built in 1963 and also houses part of the English department, was originally a model home for a proposed housing subdivision planned by Rolla Stephens on the former Mission Hills estate. When Stephens learned of the search for a new campus for the college, he worked with George A. Spiva and Morgan Hillhouse so the land could instead be used for that purpose.

Ummel Technology Center (opened in 1971) is named for Elvin Byron Ummel (1922–1993), who served on the school's board of trustees from the 1964 to 1986, when that body was abolished. The center now houses some of the programs falling under the biology and environmental health department in the School of Arts and Sciences, including the cadaver lab. It underwent a major renovation in 2011 and 2012 and had previously been used for technology and engineering courses, including automotive technology and drafting.

Thomas E. Taylor Performing Arts Center (opened in 1974) is named for former Missouri Southern board of regents member (1965–1974) and board of trustees member (1964–1975) Thomas E. Taylor (1902–1975). The 2,000-seat performing arts center was built on a $1 million bond and is home to the theatre department.

Taylor Hall (opened in 1977) also known as the Gene Taylor Education Center is named for U.S. Congressman Gene Taylor (1928–1998). Taylor had served on the board of trustees from 1964 to 1972 and was the president of that board at the time the current campus opened in 1967. Taylor Hall has been home to the school of education and psychology since its construction, though it has been enlarged since that time.

Mills Anderson Justice Center (opened in 1978) is named for former Missouri Southern board of regents (1965–1977) member Mills Anderson (1914–1999). It is home of the college's criminal justice department and law enforcement academy. It was greatly expanded in 1996.

Plaster Hall (opened in 1980) is also known as the Robert W. Plaster Free Enterprise Center and is named for Robert W. Plaster (1930–2008), a former Joplin Junior College student and the founder of Empire Gas. Formerly known as Matthews Hall and named after Norval M. Matthews (1895–1977), an original member of the school's board of regents from 1965 until his death, the building and the school of business, which has resided in it since its construction, were renamed after Plaster in 2006 when he made the largest donation in the college's history. Prior to this building's construction, the school of business had been located in the former Mission Hills mansion, today the Ralph L. Gray Alumni Center, from 1969 to 1980.

Webster Hall (opened in 1992) is named for Richard M. Webster (1922–1990), a former speaker of the Missouri House of Representatives and a longtime state senator representing the area from 1962 until his death. The building cost $7.5 million at the time of its construction and is home to the social sciences, communications, foreign languages, and international studies departments. The W. Robert Corley Auditorium is located inside Webster Hall. It was named after William Robert Corley, a local businessman following a significant donation by him in 2009.

Bud Walton Black Box Theatre (opened in 1999) is named for Bud Walton, brother of Walmart founder Sam Walton and a financial donor for the construction of the facility. The Walton Black Box Theatre was built as a replacement for the college's previous Barn Theatre, which was destroyed by fire in 1990.

Julio S. Leon Health Sciences Center (opened in 2010) is named for Julio Leon, who served as the president of the university from 1982 to 2007. It houses programs in nursing, dental hygiene, kinesiology, medical technology, psychology, radiologic technology and respiratory therapy.

Jeremiah "Jay" Nixon Hall (opened in 2019) is named for the 55th governor of Missouri Jeremiah "Jay" Nixon, who served from 2009 to 2017. Governor Nixon campaigned and received $5.2 million that was used to construct the hall and renovate the nearby Reynolds hall. Nixon hall is used for mathematics and other STEM fields. The building is three stories and houses staff offices, study rooms, and many classrooms. It is connected to Reynolds hall via a sky bridge on the second floor and is the newest building on campus.

=== Alumni Center ===
The Ralph L. Gray Alumni Center (opened in 2011) is named after Ralph L. Gray, a major donor for the building's restoration. The building, also known as the Mission Hills mansion, is the oldest structure on campus, built in 1926 as the private home of Lucius Buchanan. When the property was purchased for use as the university's campus in 1964, the mansion was originally used by then President Leon Billingsly for his office space. It then served as the home of the school of business from 1969 to 1980 and the social sciences department between 1987 and 1992. It sat empty from 1992 until 2006, when the process of restoring and renovating it for its current use started.

=== Former buildings ===
Joplin Junior College at 4th Street & Byers Avenue (1938–1959) was the first permanent home of the college (the year previously the college's courses were taught in the Joplin High School building at 8th Street and Wall Avenue). The building, which was originally constructed in 1897 and then nearly doubled in size in 1907, had previously served as the home of Joplin High School and later as North Junior High School before being renovated for use by the fledgling college. Joplin Junior College moved out of the building in 1959, moving to the now Joplin School District Administrative Offices at 8th Street and Wall Avenue. The 4th Street & Byers Avenue building was razed in 1961.

Blaine Hall (1946–1959) was named after Harry E. Blaine, the dean of Joplin Junior College from 1937 to 1947. It is not to be confused with the dormitory on the current campus that is also named after Blaine. It was located in a formerly private residence that was near Joplin Junior College's first home at the corner of 4th Street and Byers Avenue. Blaine Hall acted as a student union and had a cafeteria and a student lounge. The building was abandoned by the college when it moved to its second home at 8th Street and Wall Avenue in 1959. It was eventually torn down.

Joplin Junior College/Jasper County Community College at 8th Street and Wall Avenue (1959–1967) was the second permanent home of what was then Joplin Junior College (though the first year the college had offered courses in 1937 those classes had also taken place in this building). During the time the college was in this building it was renamed Jasper County Community College. This structure was built in 1917 as the home of Joplin High School, replacing the previous building at 4th Street & Byers Avenue, which was also home to Joplin Junior College from 1938 to 1959. The college was in this building from 1959 until 1967, when it moved to its current campus. The building became Memorial High School from 1968 to 1985 and then Memorial Middle School. The nearly 100-year-old structure still stands and now serves as the Joplin public school district's Memorial Education Center.

The Barn Theatre (1967–1990) was the first performing arts space on the current university campus. It had originally served as a dairy barn for the Mission Hills farm. With a limited budget and no theatre space included among the original academic buildings planned for the campus, theatre department staff transformed the former dairy barn into the campus's first theatre. It remained popular and in use even after the construction of the much larger and modern Thomas E. Taylor Center for Performing Arts in 1973. The Barn Theatre was destroyed by a fire on Thanksgiving Day in 1990.

The Learning Center (1967–2005) was renovated out of the shell of the former garage of the Mission Hills mansion. The original space had been expanded and at previous times housed the school of business and the department of social sciences. In 1992 it was remodeled for use for student tutoring and other similar needs. It was demolished in 2005 to make way for the construction of the George S. Beimdiek Recreation Center and Willcoxon Student Health Center and for the renovation of the Mission Hills mansion into the Ralph L. Gray Alumni Center, which takes up some of the footprint previously occupied by the Learning Center.

The Guest House (1967–2005) had served as a guest house for the Mission Hills mansion when it was a private residence. But following the establishment of the university on its current campus, the school's newspaper, The Chart, had its offices in this building, though they were later moved to Hearnes Hall and are currently located inside Webster Hall. The building served various other purposes as office space and eventually storage for the university before being razed in 2005.

== Campus life ==
Undergraduate demographics as of Fall 2023
Race and ethnicity	Total
White	69%
Hispanic	9%
Black	7%
American Indian/Alaska Native	4%
Asian	3%
International student	3%
Native Hawaiian/Pacific Islander	1%
Unknown	2%
Two or more races	1%
Economic diversity
Low-income (Note: The percentage of students who received an income-based federal Pell grant intended for low-income students.)	45%
Affluent (Note: The percentage of students who are a part of the American middle class at the bare minimum.)	55%

=== Residential life ===
The campus has two traditional dormitories, eight apartment-style housing complexes, and two suite-style dormitories. The dormitories are McCormick and Blaine Halls; the apartments are Gockel, Stegge, Dishman, Dryer, Stone, Headlee, Maupin, and Mitchell Halls; and the suite-style dorms are located in East Hall and The Quads. Also a part of the residence area of campus is the Mayes Student Life Center, which is home to the university's cafeteria, gaming room, computer labs, and study space. These dorms house about 900 students. The Quads, opened fall of 2015, is a three-story complex that features 51 student apartments the vast majority of which will be four bedrooms. Lion Village is the newest residence hall, opening in 2021.

Mayes Student Life Center (opened in 1993) is named for Dianne S. Mayes (1936–1995), a longtime supporter of the university. Undergoing a renovation in 2026, the SLC includes a computer lab, laundry facilities, an aerobic workout room, and a gaming room. The first floor is separated between a gaming area of pool tables, ping pong tables, foosball, and a shuffleboard, and a study area complete with individual study rooms and white boards. A major addition, including a cafeteria, was added in 1999.

==== Residence halls ====
Blaine Hall (opened in 1971) is named after Harry E. Blaine (1873–1955), who served as the first dean of what was then Joplin Junior College from its opening in 1937 until his retirement in 1947. This facility is all male and is arranged as a traditional style dormitory, housing 174 students, mostly freshmen.

McCormick Hall (opened in 1971) is named after Martha McCormick (1902–1987), who taught mathematics from 1939 to 1973 at what was first Joplin Junior College and then later Missouri Southern State College. This facility houses 90 students and was one of the first two dormitories built on the campus, housing only female students since it opened.

Dishman Hall (opened in 1980) is named after Darral Dishman (1936–1984), who started as an art professor at what was then Joplin Junior College in 1964. He later became head of the department and remained at the college until his death. Dishman Hall is a dormitory that is set up as suite style apartments and houses 32 students.

Dryer Hall (opened in 1980) is named after Lloyd L. Dryer (1911–1984), who was a professor of psychology at what was first Joplin Junior College and then Missouri Southern State College. Dryer Hall is a dormitory that is set up as suite style apartments and houses 32 students.

Gockel Hall (opened in 1980) is named after Harry Gockel (1902–1984), who started at what was then Joplin Junior College in 1939, just two years after its founding, and retired from the college in 1972. He was a professor of history, economics and geography. A bequest in his and his late wife's, Berniece Gockel (1911–1995), will provided the seed money for the university's annual Harry and Berniece Gockel International Symposium. Gockel Hall is a dormitory that is set up as suite style apartments and houses 32 students.

Headlee Hall (opened in 1980) is named after Cleetus Juanita Headlee (1911–2000), who from 1946 to 1976 was an English professor at what was then Joplin Junior College and later Missouri Southern State College. Between 1948 and 1967 she was the advisor for the college newspaper, The Chart. Headlee Hall is a dormitory that is set up as suite style apartments and houses 32 students.

Stegge Hall (opened in 1980) is named after Dudley Frank Stegge (1923–1992), who started at what was then Joplin Junior College in 1951 as a track and football coach. Stegge later served as dean of students from 1967 to 1969 and was the director of the Student Union, now Billingsly Student Center, from 1969 until his retirement in 1980. Stegge Hall is a dormitory that is set up as suite style apartments and houses 32 students.

Maupin Hall (opened in 1987) is named after Jim Maupin (1923–2006), who served as dean of technology at what was then Missouri Southern State College, retiring in 1992. He started his career with the college in 1954 teaching biology. Maupin Hall is a dormitory that is set up as suite style apartments and houses 32 students.

Mitchell Hall (opened in 1987) is named after Grace Clayton Mitchell (1920–2006), a longtime English professor at what was first Joplin Junior College and later Missouri Southern State College. She first taught at the school in 1946 and after taking a break from teaching returned in 1958 and remained until retiring in 1981. Mitchell Hall is a dormitory that is set up as suite style apartments and houses 32 students.

Stone Hall (opened in 1991) is named after Dorothy Aleta Stone (1909–2001), who was a professor of business administration at what was first Joplin Junior College and then Missouri Southern State College from 1939 to 1975. Stone Hall is a dormitory that is set up as suite style apartments and houses 32 students.

East Hall (opened in 2002) is the largest of the university's residential buildings. It houses 202 students in suite style dormitories. East hall is named because it is the easternmost residential building on campus.

The Quads (opened in 2015) "Quads" come from the 4 bedroom style in which each "room" is built. There is a living area, kitchen, 4 bedrooms, each with their own bathroom, and a laundry room in each "Quad." The Quads house 200 students.

Lion Village (opened in 2021) is the newest residence hall on the campus. Lion Village contains twelve suite-style rooms, and several single and double traditional rooms with communal bathrooms.

=== Greek life ===
Currently, MSSU is home to two fraternities, two sororities and many honorary and professional societies. MSSU has the Pi-Eta chapter of Kappa Sigma fraternity, and the Delta Pi chapter of Kappa Alpha Order fraternity. Phi Delta Theta began operating on campus in 2020. Missouri Southern has the Zeta Alpha chapter of Alpha Sigma Alpha sorority and the Eta Upsilon chapter of Zeta Tau Alpha sorority. Missouri Southern does not have any brick-and-mortar or traditional Greek housing.

=== Student organizations, groups and activities ===
There are over 70 student organizations. These organizations range from ethnic to political, religious to special interest.

MSSU Student Senate (SS) is the official voice of the student body at Missouri Southern State University. SS strives to find solutions to campus issues by making policy recommendations to the administration. MSSU Student Senate is a forum for problems, concerns, questions, suggestions, and ideas as they relate to student life on campus. MSSU Student Senate serves as the governing body for all students and more than 70 student organizations on campus. SS was established in MSSU's early years and has been active on campus ever since. MSSU Student Senate is entirely funded by student fees, receiving a budget of $20,000 each academic year. Meetings are held once a week on Wednesdays and are open to the public.

The Campus Activities Board (CAB) orchestrates activities and programs in the Billingsly Student Union and around campus. CAB is a student-run programming board dedicated to enhancing the college experience at Missouri Southern. By effectively utilizing the Student Involvement Fee, CAB aims to provide educational, entertaining, cultural, and leisure opportunities to complement the students' academic experience.

Intramural sports are also available on campus. The university also supports students competing in collegiate mock trial as governed by the American Mock Trial Association.

Missouri Southern currently has many student organizations including Student Senate, Campus Activities Board, 34 Departmental organizations, 12 honors organizations, 9 religious organizations, and 19 special interest organizations. The university also has a school newspaper, The Chart, and an alumni magazine, Crossroads.

=== Intramurals ===
Missouri Southern has a sophisticated intramural sports program. Sports included are flag football, softball, whiffleball, volleyball, 5-on-5 basketball, 3-on-3 basketball, mini-golf, soccer, hold-'em poker, bowling, table tennis, dodgeball and billiards.

== Athletics ==
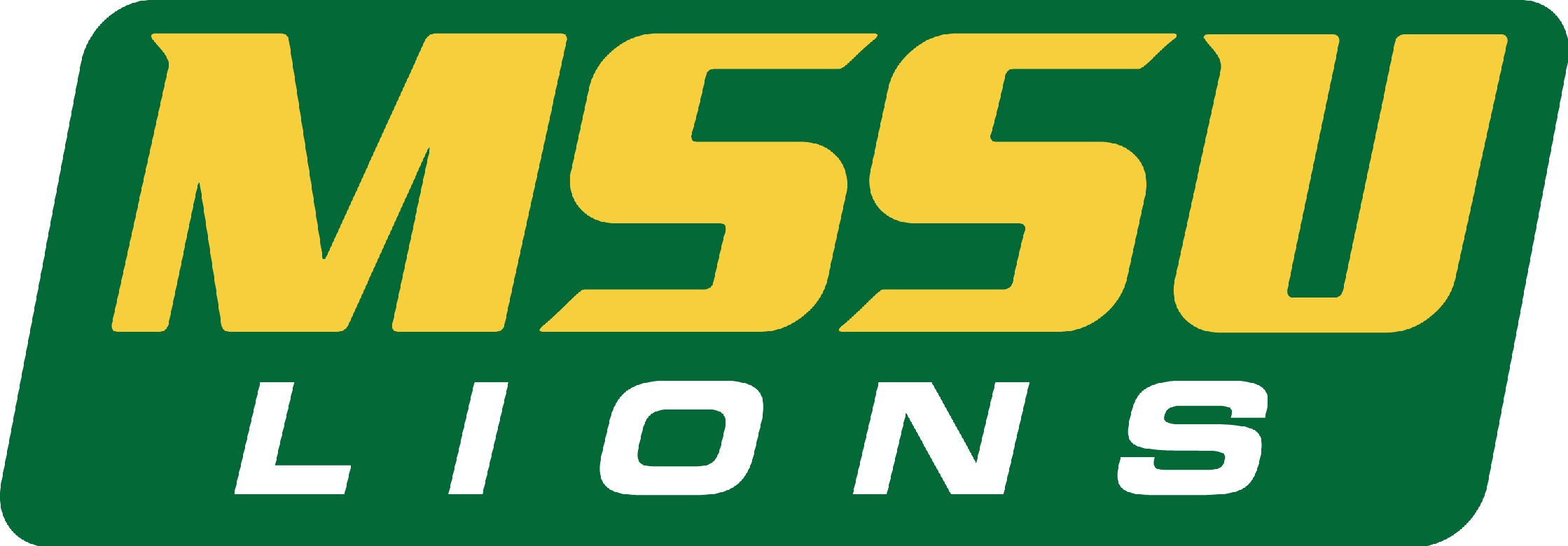
MSSU Lions wordmark.

Missouri Southern's mascot is the Lions. The Lions play in NCAA Division II as a member of the Mid-America Intercollegiate Athletics Association. MSSU fields seven men's and seven women's sports. The program has had over 250 All-Americans in its history after starting off as a member of the NAIA and in 1989 joining the NCAA. The program was a member of the Central States Intercollegiate Conference while a member of the NAIA.

== Notable alumni ==
- Allen Barbre, professional football player.
- Bob Beatty, high school football coach.
- Lonny Chapman, actor.
- Arrell Gibson, historian.
- Pam Johnson, first women editor of The Arizona Republic
- James Jordan, actor.
- Richard Jordan, professional football player.
- Terry Joyce, professional football player.
- Janet L. Kavandi, NASA astronaut.
- Ann Kelley, Missouri House Representative.
- Roderick C. Meredith, evangelist.
- Gary Nodler, Missouri State Senator.
- J. Eddie Peck, actor.
- Rajindra Campbell, Olympic Bronze Medalist (2024) for Shot Put.
- Ron Richard, Speaker of the Missouri House of Representatives and President of the Missouri Senate.
- Larry Roberts, Oklahoma House Representative.
- Rod Smith, professional football player.
- Jeff Speakman, martial artist and actor.
- Mark Tedford, Oklahoma Congressman.
- James Thrash, professional football player.
- Dennis Weaver, actor.
- William L. Webster, American politician
- Brandon Williams, professional football player.
- Margaret Roach Wheeler, Native American fasion designer
- Logan VanWey, professional baseball player.
