= Greene County Daily World =

Local American newspaper in Indiana

- Type: Daily newspaper
- Format: Broadsheet
- Owner(s): Paxton Media Group
- Publisher: Chris Pruett
- Editor: Chris Pruett
- Founded: 1905
- Headquarters: 79 South Main P.O. Box 129 Linton, IN 47441
- Circulation: 6,000 Daily
- Website: gcdailyworld.com

The Greene County Daily World (formerly the Linton Daily Citizen and Bloomfield Evening World) is a local newspaper founded in 1905 and published in Greene County, Indiana. It is owned by Paxton Media Group.

== History ==
In 1905 Joe E. Turner sold his interest in the Linton Daily Call and began his own semi-weekly newspaper, the Linton Citizen. In 1909 this absorbed the Linton Daily Call, becoming the Linton Daily Citizen. This became the dominant newspaper in Linton.

In 2003 both the Linton Daily Citizen and the neighboring Bloomfield Evening World were purchased by Rust Communications. The newspapers were merged to become The Daily World in January 2006. In January 2007 this was renamed the Greene County Daily World.

In June 2024, Rust sold the newspaper to Paxton Media Group.
