= Branson Tri-Lakes News =

Newspaper in Missouri, U.S.

- Type: Twice-weekly newspaper
- Owner: Lancaster Management Inc.
- Language: English
- Headquarters: Branson, Missouri
- Website: bransontrilakesnews.com

The Branson Tri-Lakes News is the local newspaper covering Branson, Taney County and Stone County in Missouri, and traces its roots to the oldest publications in Taney County.

Starting in 2009 it published twice a week on Wednesday and Saturday, having formerly published five times a week.

In 1992, the Taney County Republican merged with the Branson Beacon, the White River Leader, and the Southwest Missourian to form the Branson Tri-Lakes Daily News. It retained that name until it stopped being a daily newspaper in 2009.

The Taney County Republican began publishing in 1895. The Branson Tri-Lakes News recognized 100 years of continuous publication by itself and its various precursors in January 2012.

Branson Tri-Lakes News was acquired by Lancaster Management Inc (LMI) in November 2013.

The paper also produced several regular special publications including the monthly entertainment-themed Branson This Week. All of its publications, including both editions of the Branson Tri-Lakes News, were full color.

In July 2026, the newspaper announced its closure, along with the closure of two other LMI publications in the area, the Barry County Advertiser and the Stone County Republican.

It was reopened by local business owners after a brief closure.

== Awards ==
In 2011, the Branson Tri-Lakes News was awarded first place in its class for General Excellence and Best News Content by the Missouri Press Association.

In 2022, the Branson Tri-Lakes News received first place for Best Overall Design, second place for Best Investigative Reporting, and third place for Best News Story, Community Service, General Excellence, Best Story about Education, Magazine/Alternative Publication, and Best Business Story as part of 12 awards from the Missouri Press Association's Better Newspaper Awards.
