= Cassville Democrat =

Newspaper in Missouri, US

The Cassville Democrat
- Type: Weekly newspaper
- Format: Broadsheet
- Owner(s): Troutman Media LLC
- Founder(s): John Ray
- Publisher: Kyle Troutman
- General manager: Jordan Troutman
- Founded: 1871
- City: Cassville, Missouri
- Circulation: 1,000 (as of 2025)
- Website: cassville-democrat.com

The Cassville Democrat is a weekly newspaper located in Cassville, Missouri, the county seat of Barry County, Missouri. It has a weekly circulation of about 1,000 and has been published continuously since its founding in 1871. The newspaper's motto is "Covering Barry County like the morning dew since 1871." Owned by Troutman Media LLC since January 1, 2023, its publisher is Kyle Troutman and Jordan Troutman serves as general manager. The Cassville Democrat focuses on local issues and news and has little national or international coverage.

== Coverage area and competitors ==
While the Cassville Democrat is located in the town of Cassville, its coverage extends across Barry County to most of the smaller towns and hamlets that do not have any independent traditional news services. In addition, it has not been alone in its local news coverage, as for a nearly 20-year period between 1967 and 1984, there were no less than three weekly newspapers operating out of Cassville, a town with a population of less than 3,000, and providing coverage to people across the county. Of those two competing papers, the Cassville Republican and the Barry County Advertiser, only the Barry County Advertiser continues to this day, with the 106-year-old Republican closing in 1984. As the names signify, during their prime, the Cassville Democrat espoused and promoted the views of the Democratic Party while the Cassville Republican did the same for the Republican Party, creating a fierce political climate in the small town. Since that time, the Cassville Democrat has shred its former political affiliation and instead focuses on being the primary local news source.

== Ownership history ==
The Cassville Democrat was established in 1871 by John Ray, a native of Barren County, Kentucky, who moved to Barry County in 1850. Ray had been a surgeon in the Union army during the Civil War. He would publish the Cassville Democrat until his death in 1889. Following Ray's death, his son Charles Ray took over as editor and publisher of the paper and continued in that role until his own death in 1926. During his time as publisher, Charles Ray also served two terms as county treasurer, and was postmaster of Cassville under the Cleveland administration. Charles Ray's wife, Jennie Pharis Ray, and sons John and Means Ray took over the responsibilities of the newspaper following his death. Eventually, ownership of the paper moved on to Bob Mitchell, Charles Ray's grandson through his youngest daughter, Katherine. Bob Mitchell retained ownership of the Cassville Democrat up to the mid-1990s when, after more than 120 years of single-family ownership, he sold the publication to Mike and Lisa Schlichtman. In 2004, the Schlichtmans sold the then 132-year-old publication to the Rust Communications newspaper chain. The company sold the paper in March 2022 to CherryRoad Media, who in turn sold it in December to Kyle Troutman and Jordan Troutman.
