= List of newspapers in New Hampshire =

This is a list of newspapers in New Hampshire.

== Daily newspapers ==
- The Beachcomber of Hampton Beach
- The Citizen of Laconia (closed in 2016)
- Concord Monitor of Concord
- The Conway Daily Sun of Conway
- The Dartmouth at Dartmouth College (Hanover)
- Derry News of Derry
- Eagle Times of Claremont
- Foster's Daily Democrat of Dover
- The Keene Sentinel of Keene
- The Laconia Daily Sun of Laconia
- Manchester Ink Link of Manchester
- The Nashua Broadcaster in Nashua (closed in 2011)
- New Hampshire Union Leader of Manchester
- The Portsmouth Herald of Portsmouth
- The Telegraph of Nashua
- Valley News of Lebanon

== Weekly newspapers ==
- Bedford Bulletin - Bedford
- Bedford Journal - Bedford
- The Berlin Daily Sun of Berlin
- Berlin Reporter - Berlin
- Bow Times - Bow
- The Bridge Weekly Sho-Case - Woodsville
- Carriage Towne News - Kingston
- Carroll County Independent - Ossipee
- The Colebrook Chronicle - Colebrook
- The Concord Insider - Concord
- Coos County Democrat - Lancaster
- The Exonian - Exeter
- Gilford Steamer - Gilford
- Goffstown News - Goffstown
- The Granite State News - Wolfeboro
- The Hippo - Manchester, Concord and Nashua editions
- Hooksett Banner - Hooksett
- Hudson-Litchfield News - Hudson and Litchfield
- InterTown Record - North Sutton
- The Littleton Courier - Littleton
- The Londonderry Times - Londonderry
- Meredith News - Meredith
- Merrimack Journal - Merrimack
- Milford Cabinet - Milford
- The Monadnock Ledger Transcript - Peterborough (bi-weekly)
- Newfound Landing - Alexandria, Bridgewater, Bristol, Danbury, Groton, Hebron, Hill, and New Hampton
- The New Hampshire - University of New Hampshire
- New Hampshire Business Review - New Hampshire
- New Hampshire Free Press - Keene
- The New Hampshire Gazette - Portsmouth (bi-weekly)
- The Nutfield News - Londonderry
- Pelham-Windham News - Pelham and Windham
- Plymouth Record Enterprise - Plymouth
- Rochester Times - Rochester
- Salem Community Patriot - Salem
- Salem Observer - Salem
- The Tri-Town Times - Londonderry
- The Weirs Times - Weirs Beach
- Windham Independent News - Windham
- Winnisquam Echo - Tilton

== Monthly newspapers ==
- Merrimack Valley Voice - Penacook

== Defunct ==
=== Amherst ===
Newspapers published in Amherst, New Hampshire:

- The Amherst Journal, and the New-Hampshire Advertiser. W., Jan. 16, 1795-Jan. 9, 1796.
- Village Messenger. W., Jan. 9, 1796-Dec. 27, 1800+

=== Colebrook ===
Newspapers published in Colebrook, New Hampshire:

- The News and Sentinel (1870-2024)

=== Concord ===
Newspapers published in Concord, New Hampshire:

- Concord Herald. W., Mar. 9, 1791-Sept. 1, 1792.
- The Concord Herald, and Newhampshire Intelligencer. W., Jan. 6, 1790-Jan. 12, 1791.
- Courier of New Hampshire. W., Feb. 13, 1794-Dec. 27, 1800+
- The Federal Mirror. W., Apr. 10, 1795-Nov. 15, 1796.
- The Granite Monthly 1887-1930

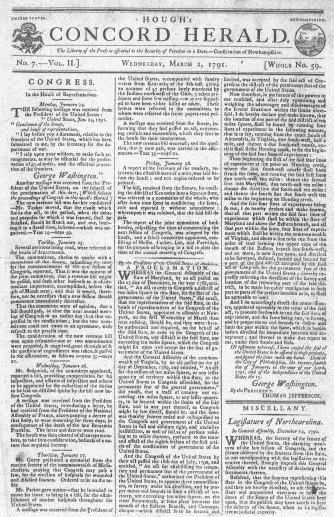
Hough's Concord Herald, 1791

- Hough's Concord Herald. W., Jan. 19, 1791-Mar. 2, 1791; Sept. 8, 1792-Jan. 30, 1794.
- The Mirror. W., Oct. 10, 1797-Sept. 2, 1799.
- The Mirrour. W., Oct. 29, 1792-Apr. 3, 1795.
- New Starr. W., Apr. 11-Oct. 3, 1797.
- Republican Gazetteer. W., Nov. 22, 1796-Jan. 17, 1797.
- Russell & Davis' Republican Gazetteer. W., Jan. 24-Apr. 4, 1797.
- The Independent Democrat. W., 1849–1871.

=== Dover ===
Newspapers published in Dover, New Hampshire:

- Morning Star. 11 May 1826 – 1911
- The Phenix. W., Apr. (11), 1792-Aug. 29, 1795.
- Political and Sentimental Repository, Or Strafford Recorder. W., July 15-Jan. 6 (?) Or June 9 (?), 1791.
- The Political Repository, Or Stafford Recorder. W., Jan. 6(?) Or June 9(?), 1791-Jan. 4, 1792(?).
- The Sun. Dover Gazette, and County Advertiser. W., Nov. 18 Or 25, 1795-Dec. 31, 1800+

=== Exeter ===
Newspapers published in Exeter, New Hampshire:

- American Herald of Liberty. W., May 14, 1793-Nov. (?), 1795.
- Exeter Federal Miscellany. W., Jan. 16-Sept. 24, 1799.

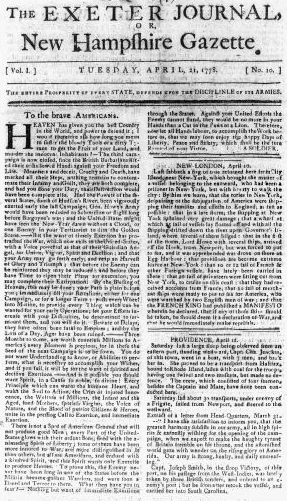
Exeter Journal, or, New Hampshire Gazette, 1778

- The Exeter Journal, or, New Hampshire Gazette. W., Feb. 17-May 5, 1778.
- The Exeter Journal, or, The New-Hampshire Gazette, and Tuesday's General Advertiser. W., May 12-June 9, 1778.
- The Exeter Journal, or, The New-Hampshire Gazette, and Tuesday's General Advertiser. W., Feb. 23-May 25, 1779.
- The Freeman's Oracle, and New-Hampshire Advertiser. W., July 1, 1786-Apr. 25, 1788.
- The Herald of Liberty. W., Feb. 20-May 8, 1793.
- The Herald of Liberty, or, Exeter Gazette. W., Nov. (?), 1795-July 12, 1796.
- Lamson's Weekly Visitor. W., May 5–27, 1795.
- The New Hampshire Gazette, or, Exeter Morning Chronicle. W., June 1-Aug. 31, 1776.
- The New-Hampshire (State) Gazette, or, Exeter Circulating Morning Chronicle. W., Sept. 7, 1776-Jan. 14, 1777.
- New-Hampshire Gazette, or, State Journal and General Advertiser. W., June 16, 1778-Feb. 16, 1779.
- The Newhampshire Gazetteer. W., Aug. 18, 1789-Feb. 13, 1793.
- Political Banquet, and Farmer's Feast. W., Oct. 8-Dec. 31, 1799.
- Ranlet's Federal Miscellany. W., Dec. 5, 1798-Jan. 9, 1799.
- The State Journal, or, The New-Hampshire Gazette, and Tuesday's Liberty Advertiser. W., Jan. 21, 1777-July 15, 1777.
- The Weekly Visitor. W., June 2–9, 1795.
- The Weekly Visitor, or, Exeter Gazette. W., June 16-Dec. 26, 1795.

=== Gilmanton ===
Newspapers published in Gilmanton, New Hampshire:

- The Gilmanton Gazette: and Farmers' Weekly Magazine. W., Aug. 30-Dec. 20, 1800.

=== Hanover ===
Newspapers published in Hanover, New Hampshire:

- Dartmouth Gazette. W., Aug. 27, 1799-Dec. 27, 1800+
- The Eagle, or, Dartmouth Centinel. W., July 22, 1793- July (?), 1798.

=== Keene ===
Newspapers published in Keene, New Hampshire:

- The Columbian Informer, or, Cheshire Journal. W., Apr. 4, 1793-July 21, 1795.
- The New-Hampshire Recorder, and the Weekly Advertiser. W., Aug. 7, 1787-Mar. 18, 1788; and Apr. 15, 1788- Mar. 3, 1791.
- New-Hampshire Sentinel. W., Mar. 23, 1799-Dec. 27, 1800+

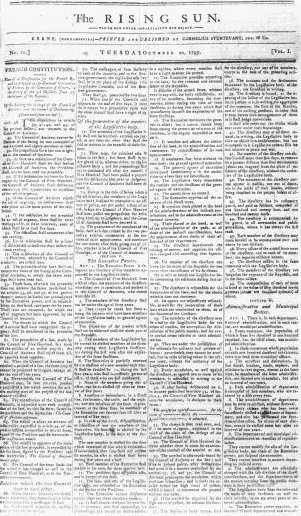
The Rising Sun, 1795

- The Rising Sun. W., Aug. 11, 1795-June 23, 1798.

=== Laconia ===
Newspapers published in Laconia, New Hampshire:

- The Citizen (1926-2016)

=== Meredith ===
Newspapers published in Meredith, New Hampshire:

- The Belknap Gazette. Sep 6,1842-July 30, 1864 (possibly more)

=== Portsmouth ===
Newspapers published in Portsmouth, New Hampshire:

- Federal Observer. W., Nov. 22, 1798-May 29, 1800.
- Fowle's New-Hampshire Gazette, and General Advertiser. W., Dec. 24, 1784-June 2, 1787.
- The Freeman's Journal, or, New-Hampshire Gazette. W., May 25, 1776 – June 9, 1778.
- The New-Hampshire Gazette. W., Oct. 7, 1756-Mar. 4, 1763.
- The New-Hampshire Gazette. W., Apr. 16, 1793-Dec. 30, 1800+
- The New-Hampshire Gazette, and General Advertiser. W., Sept. 8, 1781-Dec. 17, 1784.
- The New-Hampshire Gazette, and Historical Chronicle. W., Mar. 11, 1763-Jan. 9, 1776.
- The New-Hampshire Gazette, and the General Advertiser. W., June 9, 1787-Apr. 9, 1793.
- New-Hampshire Gazette, or, State Journal, and General Advertiser. W., June 16, 1778 – June 4, 1781.
- New-Hampshire Gazette, State Journal, and General Advertiser. W., June 11-Sept. 3, 1781.
- The New-Hampshire Mercury, and the General Advertiser. W., Dec. 24, 1784-Mar. 12, 1788.
- The New-Hampshire Spy. S.W., Oct. 24, 1786-Mar. 3, 1789.
- The Oracle of the Day. S.W., W., June 4, 1793-Dec. 28, 1799.

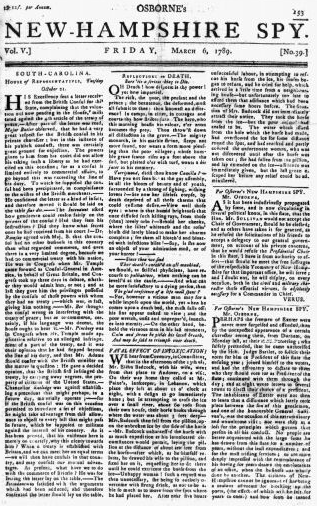
Osborne's New-Hampshire Spy, 1789

- Osborne's New-Hampshire Spy. S.W., W., Mar. 6, 1789- Mar. 2, 1793.
- The Portsmouth Mercury, and Weekly Advertiser. W., Jan. 21, 1765-Sept. 29, 1766.
- The Republican Ledger. W., Aug. 29, 1799-Dec. 30, 1800+
- The United States Oracle of the Day. W., Jan. 4-Dec. 27, 1800+

=== Walpole ===
Newspapers published in Walpole, New Hampshire:

- Farmer's Museum, or, Lay Preacher's Gazette. W., Apr. 1, 1799-Feb. 10, 1800.
- Farmers' Museum, or, Literary Gazette. W., Feb. 17- Dec. 29, 1800+
- The Farmer's Weekly Museum: Newhampshire and Vermont Journal. W., Apr. 4, 1797-Mar. 25, 1799.
- The Newhampshire and Vermont Journal, or, The Farmer's Weekly Museum. W., Apr. 11, 1794-Mar. 28, 1797.
- The Newhampshire Journal, or, The Farmer's Weekly Museum. W., Apr. 11, 1793-Apr. 4, 1794.

== See also ==
- List of radio stations in New Hampshire
- List of television stations in New Hampshire

Adjoining states

- List of newspapers in Maine
- List of newspapers in Massachusetts
- List of newspapers in Vermont

Comprehensive

- Lists of newspapers
- List of newspapers in the United States

Frequency

- List of free daily newspapers in the United States
- List of weekly newspapers in the United States

Circulation

- List of international newspapers originating in the United States
- List of national newspapers in the United States
- List of newspapers in the United States by circulation
- List of newspapers serving cities over 100,000 in the United States

Foreign language

- List of French-language newspapers published in the United States
- List of German-language newspapers published in the United States
- List of Spanish-language newspapers published in the United States

Specialty

- List of African-American newspapers in the United States
- List of alternative weekly newspapers in the United States
- List of business newspapers in the United States
- List of family-owned newspapers in the United States
- List of Jewish newspapers in the United States
- List of LGBTQ periodicals in the United States
- List of student newspapers in the United States
- List of supermarket tabloids in the United States
- List of underground press in the United States

Other

- List of defunct newspapers of the United States
