= List of free daily newspapers =

This is a list of free daily newspapers published around the world, organized by country.

== Austria ==
- Österreich

== Belgium ==
- Metro (separate Dutch and French versions)

== Brazil ==
- Destak

== Canada ==
- 24 Hours in Montreal
- Métro in Montreal

== Chile ==
- Publimetro

== Colombia ==
- Publimetro

== Croatia ==
- 24sata

== France ==
- 20 Minutes
- Direct Matin
- Metronews

== Hong Kong ==
=== Chinese ===
- am730
- Headline Daily
- Metropolis Daily

=== English ===
- The Standard
- Hong Kong Free Press

== Israel ==
- Israel Hayom
- Israel Post

== Italy ==
- Leggo
- Metro

== Malaysia ==
- theSun

== Netherlands ==
- Metro

== Philippines ==
- Inquirer Libre

== Portugal ==
- Destak

== Russia ==
- The Moscow Times

== Serbia ==
- 24 sata

== Spain ==
- 20 minutos (whole Spain) - circulation > 1,500,000 units. Editions: Madrid, Barcelona, València and Sevilla. (Madrid, Catalunya, Valencia, and Andalucía)

== Sweden ==
- Metro

== Switzerland ==
=== French ===
- 20 minutes

=== German ===
- 20 Minuten
- Baslerstab
- Blick am Abend

== United Kingdom ==
- The Metro - in several commuter areas including London, Manchester, and West Yorkshire

=== London ===
- City A.M.
- The Evening Standard - from October 2009

== United States ==
Most of the papers listed are no longer published daily (as noted); they have either ceased publication or switched to a weekly/semi-weekly schedule.

=== California ===
- Palo Alto Daily News - Palo Alto; while its website is continuously updated, the physical paper was cut back to a weekly in 2015
- Palo Alto Daily Post - Palo Alto; successor to the Daily News
- San Francisco Examiner - San Francisco As of March 2020, this paper is only published three times a week—on Sunday, Wednesday and Thursday.

=== Colorado ===
- The Aspen Times - Aspen
- Aspen Daily News - Aspen
- Colorado Daily - Boulder As of February 2020, this paper has become a weekly, published Fridays only.

=== District of Columbia ===
- Washington Examiner - Washington, D.C.; the print edition ended in 2013, although a website continues to provide current news
- Washington Express - Washington, D.C.; On September 12, 2019, Express published its last edition.
- The Epoch Times - Washington DC; The paper, while also offering paid subscriptions, continued to offer papers free at boxes around the city, until August 15, 2019.

=== Illinois ===
- RedEye - Chicago Paper became a weekly in 2017 and ceased publishing in March 2020.

=== Massachusetts ===
- Boston Metro - Boston, closed in January 2020.

=== Michigan ===
- The Michigan Daily - Ann Arbor

=== New Hampshire ===
- The Berlin Daily Sun - Berlin
- The Conway Daily Sun - North Conway
- The Laconia Daily Sun - Laconia

=== New York ===
- AM New York Metro - New York City

=== Pennsylvania ===
- Philadelphia Metro - Philadelphia

=== Puerto Rico ===
- El Vocero - became free in 2012
- Primera Hora - began 2017

=== South Carolina ===
- Bluffton Today - formerly free

=== Virginia ===
- Suffolk News-Herald - Suffolk
