= Jerah Chadwick =

Poet

Jerah Chadwick (1956 – 2016) was the Alaska Poet Laureate from 2004 to 2006. Most of his writing centers around the time he spent in Alaska in an abandoned World War II facility with his partner, Mike Rasmussen.

== Life ==
Jerah Chadwick was born in 1956 in Tacoma, Washington. Although born in Tacoma, he grew up in Tucson, Arizona due to the constant movement of his Air Force family. After finishing high school there, he attended Lake Forest College, 30 miles north of Chicago. There he earned a double major in English and Sociology and Anthropology. He then moved to the Pacific Northwest to work for Seattle Newspapers.

In 1982, he moved to Unalaska to be with his partner, a painter and sculptor named Mike Rasmussen. They lived for two years in an abandoned World War II Quonset hut which was four miles away from Morris Cove. There, Chadwick wrote poetry inspired by his surroundings and raised goats while Rasmussen did woodworking and carpentry. In 1986, Chadwick spent his winters at the University of Alaska Fairbanks working towards a Masters of Fine Arts in Creative Writing. He completed his MFA in 1988. While in Fairbanks, Chadwick lived in the dry, wood heated cabin of his friend, Joe Enzweiler, while Enzweiler was in the Lower 48.

Chadwick stayed at the university and took a job directing its Aleutian and Pribilof Center in Dutch Harbor. He was remembered as an astute and creative administrator as he managed to expand the university's off-campus offerings in the rural area he served. He was also one of the founding directors of USAFV (Unalaskans against Sexual Assault and Family Violence). In addition to his university work, he helped establish Museum of the Aleutians and assisted in a culture camp named 'Camp Qungaayux'. It was an organization that dedicated itself to preserving the Unangax cultural heritage. One of the classes he was most proud of sponsoring there was the one that taught lost Unangan bentwood hat construction techniques. He assisted elder Andrew Gronholdt, helping students make the famous long-billed hats. It was during this time that he was awarded the position of Alaska'a Poet Laureate from 2004 to 2006. Upon retiring from the university in 2008, they appointed him Professor Emeritus. To celebrate this achievement, Rasmussen built Chadwick a new house.

Chadwick had numerous publications throughout his life in journals. Perhaps his most famous publication may have been the release of his poems in a book form. His major collection of poems, "Story Hunger", was published by Salmon Press in Ireland and was successful enough that it went for a second printing in 2005. Right before he fell sick with Alzheimer's, Chadwick was working on another collection of poems. He spent the last couple of months reconnecting with fellow Lake Forest Classmates. He faced a relatively short battle with Alzheimer's dying in the care of his sister, Barbara Nardone, on June 7, 2016.

== Works ==
=== Books ===
- Story Hunger, Salmon Publishing, 1999
- Chapbook: From the Cradle of Storms, State street press, 1990
- Chapbook: The Dream Horse, Seal Press, 1980\

=== Anthologies ===
- The Alaska Reader, Fulcrum, 2005
- From the Island's Edge, Graywolf Press, 1995
- Atomic Ghosts, Coffee House Press, 1995
- Season of Dead Water, Breitenbush Books, 1990
- State Street Reader, State Street press, 1990
- INROAD: 27 Alaskan Writers, University of Alaska Press, 1989
- New Men, New Minds, Crossing Press, 1986
- Contemporary Art and Writing of the Aleutian Islands, Penumbra Press, 1983

=== Journal publications ===
- Alaska Quarterly Review
- Bellingham Review
- Crab Creek Review
- Cutbank
- Ice-flow
- James White Review
- Mid-American Review
- New York Quarterly
- Northern Review
- Passages North
- Permafrost
- Wilderness
- Writers' Forum
