= The Keene Sentinel =

Local newspaper in Keene, New Hampshire

- Type: Daily newspaper
- Founder: John Prentiss
- Publisher: Thomas "Tom" Ewing
- President: Sean Burke
- Editor-in-chief: Anika Clark and Cecily Weisburgh
- Managing editor: Bill Bilodeau and Jack Rooney
- Founded: March 1799
- Language: English
- Headquarters: 60 West St., Keene, New Hampshire
- Website: keenesentinel.com

The Keene Sentinel is an independently owned daily newspaper published in Keene, New Hampshire. The fifth oldest continuously published newspaper in the United States, it was went by the Sentinel after its founding by John Prentiss in March 1799 and as the New Hampshire Sentinel. It was preceded in Keene by ventures including The New Hampshire Recorder, The Cheshire Advertiser, The Columbian Informer, and The Rising Sun. It is published six days a week.

== History ==
On March 23, 1799, first issue of the New Hampshire Sentinel, a weekly paper was published by the owner, John Prentiss. He was just 21 years old when he began the paper. The newspaper would stay under the Prentiss family guidance until 1954.

From 1799 through 1847, John Prentiss published the weekly himself, until 1819, when his brother joined him for a period of two years. His son, John William Prentiss worked with him from 1828 until leaving in 1834, however, he returned in 1838 and they named their enterprise, J & J.W. Prentiss.

In 1847, John Prentiss retired and his son, John William Prentiss hired Albert Godfrey as a partner. John William retired in 1850, due to poor health. Godfrey, George S. Woodward and Samuel Woodward took ownership of the paper until 1856, when Samuel Woodward sold his ownership to Thomas Hale and Thomas C. Rand, with the stipulation that they merge American News with the Keene Sentinel, Woodward having ownership of American.

During the period between 1865 and 1872, there were some questions about ownership of the Sentinel and Clement J. Woodward purchased the holdings of O.I. French and George Ticknor, sometime around 1860. A large interest in the paper had been purchased by George Ticknor, who edited it until his death in 1866.

In 1880, the founders grandson, William H. Prentiss, became part owner and worked as city editor. In 1893, they incorporated, and Bertram Ellis, William Prentiss, Thomas Rand and Samuel Woodward became stockholders. In 1897, the Sentinel became a member of the Associated Press. Rand and Ellis sold their shares in 1912 and 1918, respectively.

In 1923, when William H. Prentiss died, he and Samuel Woodward had equal shares in the company. His wife, inherited the shares. In 1930, they built a brick building located at 60 West Street, where they published the Keene Evening Sentinel, a daily newspaper; the first issue was published on May 21, 1930. In 1935, on the passing of Mrs. William H. Prentiss, her ownership passed on to her son, John W. Prentiss, great-grandson of founder, John Prentiss. In 1927, Woodward died, his shares passing to his son, Paul, and John Prentiss becoming president. In 1945, Paul Woodward sold his shares to John E. Coffin. Coffin and Prentiss co-owned the Sentinel until Prentiss died in 1953.

In October, 1954, James D. Ewing, his wife Ruth, and business partner, Walter Paine, purchased the Sentinel, from Coffin, and the Prentiss family. In 1957, the daily New Hampshire Sentinel, was merged with the daily Keene Evening Sentinel. Later, Paine sold his interest in the paper to the Ewings. They ran The Keene Sentinel, (named The Keene Sentinel, from 1972 to present) until retiring, in 1993, selling the paper to their nephew, Thomas (Tom) Ewing. Thomas Ewing still retains ownership of the Sentinel.

Historian Alan Rumrill was a longtime contributing writer.

== Awards ==
At the 2009 New England Associated Press News Executives Association, the Sentinel won more awards for photography, design and news writing than any other newspaper. The Sentinel won 19 awards, including eight first-place honors. The Sentinel has repeatedly won awards from state and regional press associations, including 12 awards from the N.H. press association in 2014.

Former editorial writer Guy MacMillin won the Allan B. Rogers Award for the best local editorial in New England by newspapers of any size.

Under the leadership of James Ewing, the Keene Sentinel received the following awards.

- 1961 the paper received honorable mention in the Svellon Brown Awards, for meritorious and distinguished service to its public, by the New England Newspaper and Press Association.
- 1987 Yankee Quill Award, Society of Professional Journalists, for outstanding contributions to New England journalism.
- New Hampshire Award from the New Hampshire Press Association.

== Current operations ==
The daily operation includes the online service The Keene Sentinel and commercial printing operations. As of 2004, it had a paid circulation of about 14,000.

In May 2024, the newspaper sent out a memo to staff announcing it will switch to postal delivery, resulting in 11 independent carriers losing their jobs. In January 2025, the paper launched "The Keene Sentinel Local Journalism Fund" along with a community advisory board.

The Sentinel covers the city of Keene, and 30 towns in Cheshire County (Alstead, Chesterfield, Dublin, Fitzwilliam, Gilsum, Harrisville, Hinsdale, Jaffrey, Marlborough, Marlow, Nelson, Richmond, Rindge, Roxbury, Stoddard, Sullivan, Surry, Swanzey, Troy, Walpole, Westmoreland, and Winchester), Hillsborough County (Antrim, Bennington, Francestown, Greenfield, Hancock, and Peterborough) and Sullivan County (Acworth, Charlestown, and Langdon).

== See also ==
- Concord Monitor
- Foster's Daily Democrat
- New Hampshire Union Leader
- The Telegraph (Nashua)
- The Portsmouth Herald
