= The Phoenix (newspaper) =

Former American alternative weekly periodical

- The cover of the March 15, 2013, Boston edition of The Phoenix, the newspaper's last issue
- Type: Alternative weekly
- Format: Tabloid (Portland and Providence editions); Magazine (Boston edition)
- Owner: New Portland Publishing
- Publisher: Karen R. Wood
- Editor: Marian McCue
- Founded: 1966
- Ceased publication: 2013 (Boston Phoenix); 2014 (Providence Phoenix); 2023 (Portland Phoenix)
- Headquarters: Falmouth, Maine
- ISSN: 0163-3015
- OCLC number: 4350940
- Website: thephoenix.com (Boston)

The Phoenix (stylized as The Phœnix) was the name of several alternative weekly periodicals published in the United States by Phoenix Media/Communications Group of Boston, Massachusetts, including the now defunct Boston Phoenix, Providence Phoenix, Portland Phoenix, and Worcester Phoenix. These publications emphasized local arts and entertainment coverage as well as lifestyle and political coverage. The Portland Phoenix, which folded in 2019, was revived a few months later by another company, New Portland Publishing. The newspaper closed in 2023.

The papers, like most alternative weeklies, are somewhat similar in format and editorial content to The Village Voice.

== History ==
=== Origin ===
The Phoenix was founded in 1965 by Joe Hanlon, a former editor at the Massachusetts Institute of Technology's student newspaper, The Tech. Since many Boston-area college newspapers were printed at the same printing firm, Hanlon's idea was to do a four-page single-sheet insert with arts coverage and ads. He began with the Harvard Business School's newspaper, The Harbus News. A student there, James T. Lewis, became Hanlon's advertising manager.

Boston After Dark began March 2, 1966. Theater enthusiast Larry Stark began contributing theater reviews with the second issue. When the insert idea did not pan out, the trio continued Boston After Dark as a weekly free paper.

A year after the launch, Hanlon sold off his half to Lewis. For three years, Boston After Dark kept the four-page format, with Lewis as publisher, Jane Steidemann as editor, Stephen M. Mindich as ad salesman and Stark as full-time theater critic and copy editor, plus film reviews by Deac Rossell, who later went on to become head of programming at London's National Film Theatre.

Arnie Reisman was appointed executive editor beginning in November 1968 and ending in November 1971. During Reisman's term of office, what began as Boston After Dark, a 16-page entertainment weekly was turned into a 156-page news weekly on the order of The Village Voice.

=== Expansion ===
As the paper expanded, Mindich acquired a half interest. Stark quit in 1972 and began reviewing for the rival Cambridge Phoenix, which had begun October 9, 1969, started by Jeffrey Tarter. The first managing editor of the Cambridge Phoenix was April Smith, who later became a novelist (Good Morning, Killer) and TV writer-producer (Cagney & Lacey, Lou Grant, Nightmares & Dreamscapes).

Following a two-week writers' strike in August 1972, the Cambridge Phoenix was sold to Boston After Dark. Mindich's merger then became known as The Boston Phoenix, with Boston After Dark used as the name for the paper's arts and entertainment section, as well as the nameplate for a free edition of the Phoenix distributed on college campuses in Boston. In the conflicts between writers and management, ousted writers immediately started another weekly, The Real Paper (which began August 2, 1972, and continued until 1981), while management continued the Boston Phoenix.

In 1988, the company that owned the Phoenix, Phoenix Media/Communications Group, bought a similar publication in neighboring Providence, Rhode Island, called The NewPaper, which had been founded in 1978 by Providence Journal columnist Ty Davis. It continued under the NewPaper name until 1993, when it became the Providence Phoenix. In 1999, PM/CG branched out into Portland, Maine, by creating the Portland Phoenix. That same year the nameplate changed from Phoenix B.A.D. to The Boston Phoenix. From 1992 through 2000, there was also a Worcester Phoenix, but it folded due to Worcester's dwindling arts market.

In 2005, the Phoenix underwent a major redesign, switching from a broadsheet/Berliner format to a tabloid format and introduced a new logo in order to increase its appeal to younger readers.

Towards the end of its existence, The Phoenix had a weekly circulation of 253,000, and its website featured 90% of the paper's content, as well as extra content not included in the paper.

=== Mergers, closures and ownership change ===
On August 1, 2012, it was announced that Stuff Magazine and the Boston Phoenix newspaper would merge and the result would be a weekly magazine to be called The Phoenix, to debut in the fall of 2012. The first issue of the new, glossy-paper Phoenix had a cover date of September 21, 2012. On March 14, 2013, the publisher announced that the Boston Phoenix would fold effective as of the March 15, 2013, print edition, though the Portland and Providence papers would be unaffected. In October 2014, The Phoenix announced that their Providence paper would also cease publication, with last issue being the October 17 issue.

The Boston Phoenix published its last issue on March 14, 2013. A statement from publisher Mindich in that issue blamed the 2008 financial crisis and changes in the media business, particularly the downturn in print advertising revenue, as the reasons for the closing.

In November 2014, Mindich sold the Portland Phoenix to the Portland News Club LLC, publishers of The Portland Daily Sun. Although the Daily Sun would cease publication one month later, the Portland Phoenix continued to be published weekly by the new owners.

In January 2019, the owner of the since-renamed Country News Club, Mark Guerringe, announced that the Portland Phoenix would move from once weekly to bi-weekly. In February, the paper ceased publication altogether, with an announcement that the paper had folded coming in April. In an interview with the Portland Press Herald, Guerringue said he may try to relaunch the Portland Phoenix on a membership basis or as a non-profit, funded by ads for Maine's legal marijuana industry.

In August 2019, New Portland Publishing purchased the Portland Phoenix relaunching it as a weekly publication on November 13, 2019. Partners of New Portland Publishing Karen Wood (former long-time Publisher of The Forecaster) assumed the role of Publisher, and Marian McCue (former owner of The Forecaster and member of the Maine Press Association Hall of Fame) became the editor.

On July 23, 2023, the Portland Phoenix published its final issue, citing a decline in advertising revenue related to the COVID-19 pandemic.

=== Archiving ===
After the closing of the Boston Phoenix and the Providence Phoenix, Mindich reassured the public that the websites would be maintained, and the online and print archives would be preserved.

In November 2015, The Boston Globe announced that Mindich, with the help of former Phoenix columnist and Northeastern University journalism professor Dan Kennedy, had donated the Phoenix's archives to Northeastern University's Snell Library Archives and Special Collections. The gift included other publications associated with the Phoenix, including Boston After Dark, the Portland, Providence and Worcester Phoenix editions; El Planeta, Stuff and Stuff at Night magazines, and early issues of The Real Paper. Hard copies of the publications are available to the public at Snell Library. Northeastern's goal was to digitize the collection and make it available online, but the cost was found to be prohibitive. In 2021, it learned that the Internet Archive already had ownership of the complete microfilm collection of the Phoenix from 1973 to 2013. Northeastern then allowed the Internet Archive to make the collection available for download by the public without limits.

Records from the Boston WFNX radio station were donated to Northeastern University's Snell Library Archives and Special Collections.

In 2020, the online citizen science website Zooniverse started archiving the 1974 card file index, with the help of site users. After the finishing of the 1974 archives, Zooniverse moved to the 1980 index.

== Radio ==
Over the years, PMCG acquired radio stations in Boston, Portland and Providence, notably the Boston alternative rock radio station WFNX. The company owned stations serving Metro Boston, New Hampshire, and Maine. The radio stations covered the same music, arts and political scene as the paper and sold to many of the same advertisers. The Maine station, WPHX-FM, was sold to the owner of WXEX in 2011, while on May 16, 2012, the over-the-air signal and broadcast tower for the Boston station WFNX was sold to Clear Channel Communications and New Hampshire station WFEX was sold to Blount Communications. Following FCC approval of the sale, WFNX stopped broadcasting on Tuesday, July 24, 2012; the webcast ended in May 2013. Former WFNX DJs and personalities Julie Kramer, Adam 12, Henry Santoro, and Paul Driscoll joined Boston.com and formed Radio BDC, another internet radio station.

Records from WFNX were also donated to Northeastern University's Snell Library Archives and Special Collections.

== Awards ==
The Phoenix received many awards for excellence in journalism, including honors from the New England Press Association, the Penny-Missouri Newspaper Awards, the American Bar Association Gavel Awards, Michael J. Metcalfe Diversity in Media Awards and the ASCAP-Deems Taylor Awards.

In 1994, Phoenix classical music writer Lloyd Schwartz was awarded a Pulitzer Prize for Criticism.

== See also ==
- List of underground newspapers of the 1960s counterculture
- Between the Lines (1977 film)
