= Isabel Stilwell =

Portuguese author and journalist (born 1960)

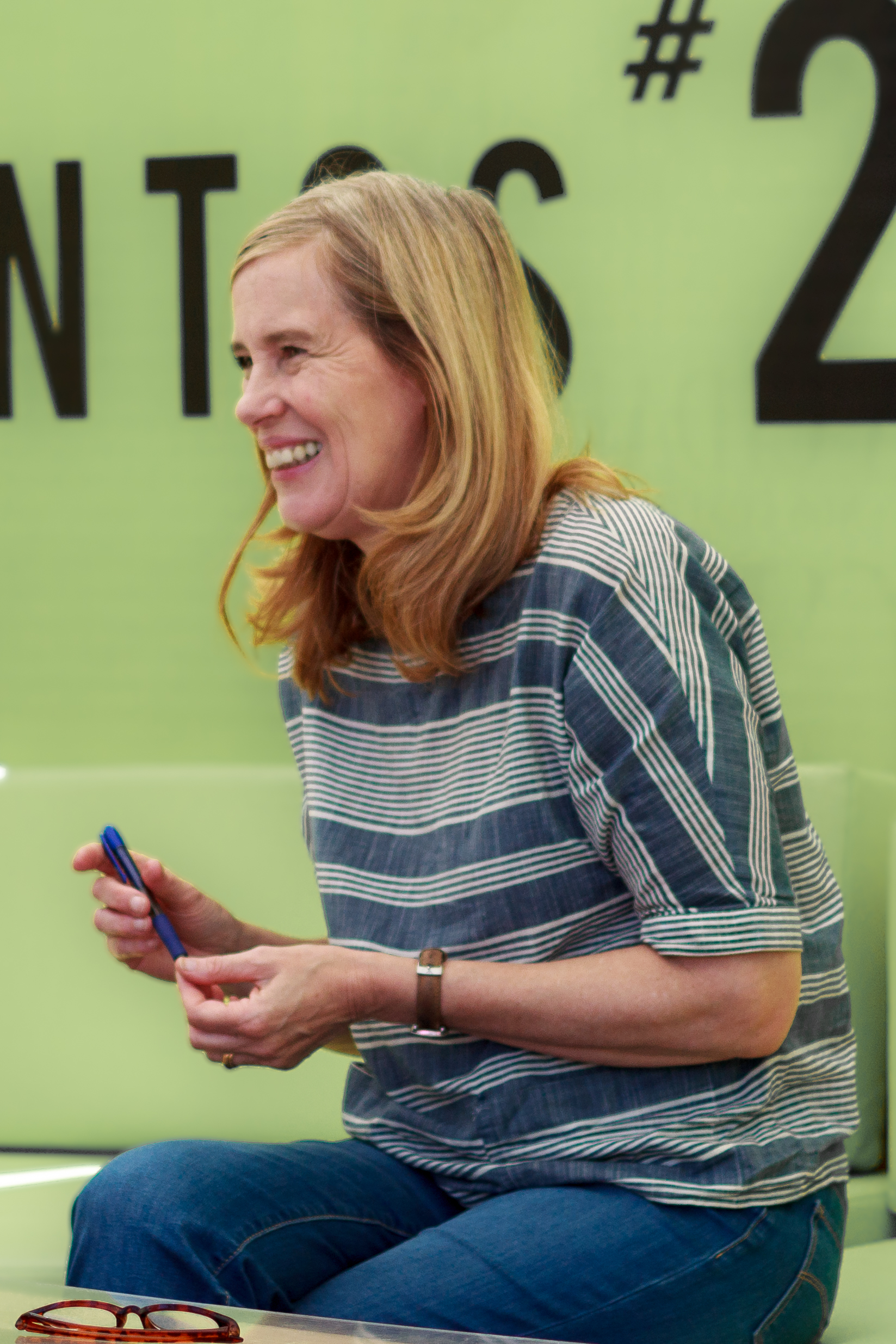
- Born: Maria Isabel Stilwell; 8 May 1960 (age 66); Lisbon, Portugal
- Occupations: Author, journalist
- Known for: Historical novels

Maria Isabel Stilwell (born 8 May 1960) is a Portuguese journalist and writer. Already known in Portugal for her journalism, broadcasting, historical novels, children's books and short stories, she expanded outside of Portugal as the author of Philippa of Lancaster – English Princess, Queen of Portugal, which was first published in translation in 2015. Since then, two more of her historical novels have been translated into English.

== Career ==
Isabel Stilwell is a member of a large Anglo-Portuguese family. Her English grandfather, William Francis Martin Stilwell, emigrated to Portugal in the early 20th-century and married Maria de Saldanha Ferreira Pinto Basto in 1913. They had eight children. Isabel Stilwell started working at the daily newspaper Diário de Notícias at the age of 21. She was the editor of the paper's Notícias Magazine for 13 years and director of the daily free newspaper Destak from 1997 to 2012. She founded and directed the Portuguese magazine Pais & Filhos and writes articles for Máxima, a women's magazine. She writes a weekly opinion column in the Jornal de Negócios, a financial and business newspaper, and contributes articles to other magazines. She has also hosted a daily radio show. Together with Carla Marina Mendes, she received an award for an article about adoption in Portugal, entitled They neither love nor let love.

Isabel Stilwell published her first historical novel on Philippa of Lancaster in 2007. This was followed by historical novels on Catherine of Braganza; Amélie of Orléans, the last Queen Consort of Portugal; Isabella of Portugal, Duchess of Burgundy; Maria II of Portugal; Theresa, Countess of Portugal; Isabel of Aragon and Maria I of Portugal. By 2020, these novels had sold over 300,000 copies, with the first, on Philippa of Lancaster, selling more than 55,000 copies.

== Publications ==
=== Children's literature ===
- As Melhores Histórias para contar em minuto e meio (1,2, e 3) (Verso de Kapa)
- Histórias para os avós lerem aos netos + Audiobook (2013, Verso de Kapa)
- Histórias para os avós lerem aos netos Livro II (2016, Verso da Capa)
- Afonso e a Espada Mágica (2016, Pais em Rede)
- O Príncipe D. Luís e o Mistério do Mapa Roubado (2017, Falcoaria Real, CMSM)

=== Historical novels ===
- Filipa de Lencastre - A rainha que mudou Portugal (2007, A Esfera dos Livros; 2016, Livros Horizonte)
- Catarina de Bragança - A coragem de uma infanta portuguesa que se tornou Rainha de Inglaterra (2008, A Esfera dos Livros; 2016, Livros Horizonte)
- D. Amélia - A Rainha Exilada que Deixou o Coração em Portugal (2010, A Esfera dos Livros; 2016, Livros Horizonte)
- D. Maria II - Tudo por um reino (2012, A Esfera dos Livros; 2016, Livros Horizonte)
- Isabel de Borgonha, Ínclita Geração - A filha de D. Filipa de Lencastre que levou Portugal ao Mundo (2013, A Esfera dos Livros; 2016, Livros Horizonte)
- D. Teresa - Uma mulher que não abriu mão do poder (2015, Manuscrito Editora; 2021, Livros Horizonte)
- Isabel de Aragão - A Rainha que Portugal imortalizou como Rainha Santa (2017, Manuscrito Editora; 2021, Livros Horizonte)
- D. Maria I - Uma rainha atormentada por um segredo que a levou à loucura (2018, Manuscrito Editora)
- D. Manuel I - Duas irmãs para um rei (2020, Planeta Editora) (Traducido en español)
- Inês de Castro (2021, Planeta Editora)
- Filipe I de Portugal - O rei maldito (2023, Planeta Editora)
- Leonor Teles - A Rainha que desafiou um reino (2024, Planeta Editora)
- Estefânia - A Rainha Virgem (2025, Planeta Portugal)

=== Other works ===
- Diário de uma Avó Galinha (2015, Verso da Kapa)
- Os dias de uma mãe que não é perfeita (2014, Livros Horizonte)
- As mães têm de ser chatas (2013, Verso de Kapa)
- Os dias do avesso (2011, Dom Quixote)
- 245,57 Euros de Telefone (2004, Texto Editora)
- É Meia-Noite, chove e ela não está em casa (2004, Texto Editora)
- Quer um filho melhor por este preço? (2003, Texto Editora)
- Um romance de amor (2002, Editorial Notícias)
- 49233$00 de Telefone (2001, Texto Editora)
- Guia para ficar a saber ainda menos sobre as mulheres (2001, Editorial Notícias; 2010, A Esfera dos Livros)
- Como eu dei com o meu psiquiatra em louco (2003, Editorial Notícias)

=== Historical novels in English ===
The three historical novels by Stilwell that have been translated into English are:

- Philippa of Lancaster - English Princess, Queen of Portugal.
- Catherine of Braganza - The courage of a Portuguese Infanta who became Queen of England.
- Maria II: The Extraordinary Friendship of Maria and Victoria, two Queens in a world of Men.
- Isabel of Portugal Duchess of Burgundy.
