= Denver Daily News =

Daily newspaper in Denver, Colorado, US

The Denver Daily News
- The Denver Daily News-We're Everywhere!
- Type: Free daily newspaper
- Format: Tabloid
- Owner(s): Jim Pavelich
- Publisher: Kristie Hannon
- Editor: Tad Rickman
- Art Director: Nicole Maestas
- Founded: May 10, 2001
- Ceased publication: June 6, 2011
- Headquarters: 2330 Broadway, Suite 102; Denver, Colorado 80205; United States
- Circulation: 25,500 Mon.–Fri.
- Readership: 54,150 Mon.–Fri.
- OCLC number: 65428976

The Denver Daily News is a former free daily newspaper in Denver, Colorado. At the time of its closure on June 6, 2011, it distributed 25,000 copies Monday through Friday in stores, coffee shops, restaurants and workplaces. Copies could also be found in the Daily's distinctive blue boxes.

The paper began publication May 10, 2001 at which time Mike Kirschbaum was publisher-editor with a staff of three. Its original offices were at 2950 West 29th Avenue in Denver. The primary investors in The Denver Daily News were Jim Pavelich and Dave Price who also published the Palo Alto Daily News, a free daily in Palo Alto, California.

The first edition of the paper was a run of 1,000 copies, distributed in Denver's Lower Downtown area. By 2007, circulation had increased to 12,000, and was up to 25,000 copies when publication ceased. Just 8 pages in its first run, its page count later ranged from 32 to 64 pages per day. Major advertisers included auto dealerships, real estate developers, real estate agents, restaurants, grocery stores, apparel retailers and service providers.

At its closure the paper employed about 20 people and the publisher-editor was Kristie Hannon. It was at that time located at 2330 Broadway in Denver. Hannon and Pavelich also founded the Vail Mountaineer which closed at the same time as the Daily News.
