= The Northern Light (Maine) =

- Type: Weekly newspaper
- Owner(s): Country News Club, Inc.
- Publisher: Mark Guerringue
- Headquarters: 64 Seavey Street, North Conway, New Hampshire 03860 United States
- Circulation: 11,600 in 2005

The Northern Light is a weekly newspaper covering parts of three counties in western Maine. It is published by Country News Club, Inc., which also publishes The Conway Daily Sun of Conway and The Berlin Daily Sun of Berlin, both in New Hampshire.

The weekly newspaper circulates in the towns of Bridgton, Brownfield, Cornish, Denmark, Fryeburg, Harrison, Hiram, Lovell, Parsonsfield and Porter, Maine. Its coverage area includes portions of Cumberland, Oxford and York counties.
