= San Francisco Daily =

The Daily Post
- Type: Daily newspaper
- Format: Tabloid
- Owner(s): Independent
- Publisher: Dave Price and Jim Pavelich
- Founded: May 3, 2006
- Headquarters: 324 High Street; Palo Alto, California, 94301
- Website: sfdaily.net

The Daily Post (formerly known as the San Francisco Daily) was a free newspaper based in the San Francisco, California area.

== History ==
The Daily Post was owned by Dave Price and Jim Pavelich, who were the publishers of the Palo Alto Daily News and its sister papers in San Mateo, Burlingame, Los Gatos, Redwood City and Berkeley. They sold that chain of newspapers to Knight Ridder on February 15, 2005. Joining Price and Pavelich as owners is Amando Mendoza, former circulation director of the Palo Alto Daily News. The newspaper ceased operations in 2009.

== See also ==
- Palo Alto Daily Post
