= Country News Club =

Country News Club, Inc. and Lakes Region News Club, Inc. are private companies that publish community newspapers in New Hampshire, United States. A third company, Portland News Club, LLC, was also affiliated with the group, but shuttered its only publication in 2019.

== Properties ==
The companies publish three Daily Sun free daily newspapers:

- The Conway Daily Sun (Country News Club), founded in 1989, in Conway, New Hampshire.
- The Berlin Daily Sun (Country News Club), founded in 1992, in Berlin, New Hampshire.
- The Laconia Daily Sun (Lakes Region News Club), founded in 2000, in Laconia, New Hampshire

Country News Club also publishes a weekly newspaper in western Maine, The Northern Light, in addition to Valley Fun, a tourist publication.

From 2009 until 2014, Portland News Club published The Portland Daily Sun in Portland, Maine. The Portland Daily Sun shuttered in 2014 after the group acquired the Portland Phoenix, which continued in print until April 2019.

Each of the company's newspapers has a local newsroom in the community it covers, though all Country News Club publications are printed in the company's Conway press plant. The Laconia Daily Sun is printed at the Portsmouth, New Hampshire presses of Seacoast Media Group, which also publishes The Portsmouth Herald.

== Personnel ==
Country News Club and its daily newspapers were founded by Dave Danforth, Mark Guerringue and Adam Hirshan, the latter two of whom were still on the Conway and Berlin papers' mastheads, as of early 2012, as publisher and editor, respectively.

Guerringue and Hirshan partnered with Edward J. Engler to found Lakes Region News Club and The Laconia Daily Sun. In 2012 Engler remained publisher-editor of the Laconia paper.

The Portland paper was begun in February 2009 as a joint effort of Guerringue, Hirsham and Curtis Robinson, a veteran of free daily newspapers in Aspen and Vail, Colorado, who served as The Portland Daily Sun's first editor. As of 2012, Robinson had left the paper and Guerringue was serving as publisher.
