= The Portland Daily Sun =

American local newspaper (2009-2014)

- News That Matters — Free
- The February 14, 2009 front page of The Portland Daily Sun
- Type: Daily newspaper
- Format: Tabloid
- Owner(s): Portland News Club, LLC.
- Publisher: Mark Guerringue
- Editor: David Carkhuff
- Founded: February 3, 2009
- Ceased publication: December 23, 2014
- Headquarters: 477 Congress Street, Suite 1105, Portland, Maine 04101, USA
- Circulation: 13,100 daily
- Price: Free
- Website: portlanddailysun.me

The Portland Daily Sun was a free newspaper that was distributed to retail and business locations in Portland, Maine between 2009 and 2014.

== History ==
The paper was founded in 2009 by Mark Guerringue and Adam Hirshan of Country News Club, in partnership with Curtis Robinson, who served as founding editor. Its first edition was printed February 3, 2009. Circulation, which started at 3,000 copies, quickly rose to 15,000. It published five days a week, Tuesday through Saturday.

In 2012, the newspaper moved its offices to the Time and Temperature Building in downtown Portland. At the time, publisher Mark Guerringue said The Portland Daily Sun was not yet profitable, but "We're poised for it, the pieces are in place".

In 2013, the newspaper decreased its publication days from five to only two per week (Tuesdays and Fridays), citing a lack of advertisers. The Portland Daily Sun published its final issue on December 23, 2014.

== Columnists and contributors ==
The Sun featured local columnists Natalie Ladd, Cliff Gallant, Telly Halkias, Karen Vaschon, Curtis Robinson, Margo Mallar, Heidi Wendel, Maggie Knowles and Bob Higgins. Tim Gillis contributed to features.

== Sisters and competitors ==
The Portland Daily Sun was the third free daily newspaper to follow the model of The Conway Daily Sun, launched by Mark Guerringue and Adam Hirshan in 1989 in Conway, New Hampshire. Its sister papers owned by Country News Club and its affiliates also included The Berlin Daily Sun and The Laconia Daily Sun, both in New Hampshire, and a weekly, The Northern Light, in western Maine.

The Sun competed head-to-head with the Portland Press Herald, the largest newspaper in the state of Maine.
