= Marta Crawford =

Portuguese sexologist and television personality

- Born: 27 April 1969; Portugal
- Known for: Her books on sexual therapy and appearances on television
- Notable work: Viver o Sexo Com Prazer
- Spouse: Filipe Crawford (divorced)
- Children: 2

Marta Crawford is a Portuguese psychologist and author, specialising in clinical sexology. She frequently appears on Portuguese TV to discuss matters related to sexual therapy.

== Background ==
Marta Crawford was born on 27 April 1969. She has two sisters and a brother. She spent two years of her childhood in the USA, where her mother was doing a PhD. Crawford is Portuguese, taking her surname from her former husband, Filipe Crawford, an actor, who has Scottish ancestors. Marta Crawford, herself, initially had ambitions to be an actor and joined an amateur group in Olivais in the Portuguese capital of Lisbon, later performing, at the age of 18, in Lisbon with the A Barraca theatre group, and subsequently touring with the group in Brazil, Cape Verde and Spain. She then obtained a degree in clinical psychology, from the Instituto Superior de Psicologia Aplicada (Higher Institute of Applied Psychology - ISPA), in the Portuguese capital of Lisbon and then went on to study clinical sexology at the Universidade Lusófona de Humanidades e Tecnologias (Lusophone University of Humanities and Technologies). She is a sex therapist accredited by the Portuguese Society of Clinical Sexology and a family therapist accredited by the Portuguese Society of Family Therapy (SPTF). She has been a member of the SPTF Board since 2011.

== Career ==
After completing her master's degree Crawford worked until 2005 as a therapist on a telephone Hotline called SOS Difficulties. She has served as a teacher at Universidade Lusófona, and has also worked at the Instituto do Emprego e Formação Profissional (Institute of Employment and Professional Training), collaborating in the psychological monitoring of users of the Behavioral Psychotherapy Service of the Júlio de Matos Hospital, a psychiatric hospital. Crawford does private clinical practice in Lisbon.

Crawford has appeared in numerous television programmes, including, in 1992, as an actor. She presented a programme called AB…Sexo on TVI in 2005 and 2006, which made her well-known in Portugal. She then presented the programme Aqui Há Sexo in 2009. In 2012, she presented 100 TABUS on the SIC women's channel. More recently she has worked as a presenter on a late-night show on the state broadcaster RTP. In February 2021 she began a series of Instagram podcasts called Ménage à Trois. She has also written for several Portuguese newspapers, including Diário de Notícias, Mundo Universitário, Lux magazine, Jornal i newspaper, and Jornal de Noticias magazine. She is also an amateur artist.

In 2015 Crawford announced she had formed a company with the idea of establishing a Museum of Sexuality, which would have a pedagogical purpose. She was seeking crowdfunding for the museum.

== Publications ==
Crawford has published three books in Portuguese. They are:

- Sexo sem tabus: para viver o sexo com prazer (Sex without Taboos), (published by Esfera dos Livros) 2006.
- Viver o Sexo Com Prazer (Living Sex with Pleasure-Guide to Female Sexuality), (Esfera dos Livros). 2008.
- Diário Sexual e Conjugal de um Casal (A Couple's Sexual and Conjugal Diary), (Esfera dos Livros). 2011
