= Diana Diamond =

American journalist

- Born: February 4, 1937; Floral Park, New York, U.S.
- Education: University of Michigan
- Occupations: Reporter and Editor

Diana Diamond (born February 4, 1937) is an American journalist who has edited a number of newspapers including the Palo Alto Daily News, and was a columnist at the Palo Alto Weekly. At the Silicon Valley/San Jose Business Journal, she was editor of their magazine, Valley Life Quarterly, and a columnist and editorial writer for the Journal. After serving as associate editor and twice-weekly columnist for the Palo Alto Daily Post she later wrote a twice-weekly column for the Palo Alto Daily News on political topics of interest to the city, the state and the nation, a thrice monthly column for The Mercury News and a blog for Palo Alto Online called "An Alternative View."

== Life ==
Diana Louise Chmielewski was born February 4, 1937, in Floral Park, New York, the daughter of Louis Bartholomew and Helen Stephanie Chmielewski. She married Horace Williams Diamond, Jr., with whom she had four children; they later divorced, and she afterwards married Bocker Morey. She graduated with a BA in English from the University of Michigan, Ann Arbor, in 1958.

== Career ==
Diamond began her career in journalism in the suburbs of Chicago, where she was a reporter, managing editor and finally senior managing editor for Lerner Newspapers, a group of publications in 49 communities with a combined circulation of 325,000.

In 1978, she was awarded a Knight Fellowship at Stanford, one of 12 journalists to receive this international honor that year.

Diamond was an editorial writer and columnist for the San Jose Mercury News. Tony Ridder, who would later become chairman and CEO of Knight Ridder, personally hired Diamond when he was publisher of the Mercury News. She served on the Mercury News Editorial Board and launched the paper's Sunday Perspective section, now discontinued as not viable.

In 1982, Diamond started California Lawyer, a magazine then published by The State Bar of California. She was its first editor-in-chief.

In 2001, she became a columnist for the Palo Alto Daily News, tackling topics ranging from "traffic calming" to teacher training, from pension perks to police misconduct, from business revitalization to beautification. In 2005, publishers Dave Price and Jim Pavelich named her executive editor of the Daily News Group, which included the Palo Alto Daily News, San Mateo Daily News, Redwood City Daily News, Los Gatos Daily News, and East Bay Daily News.

Price and Pavelich sold the paper to Knight Ridder. After Price and Pavelich left in December 2005, Knight Ridder appointed a publisher, Shareef Dajani, who, only days after taking over, fired Diamond and replace her with a former colleague from the East Bay weekly newspaper. Diamond's departure was reported by Dajani's Daily News as being a mutual "parting of the ways," but Diamond said she was "shocked" by the decision. Her dismissal triggered numerous letters to the editor and the Weekly picked up her column. In addition to writing for the Weekly, she is also a special sections editor at the San Jose Business Journal. In May 2008, Mrs. Diamond announced that she was leaving the Weekly to join the Palo Alto Daily Post, founded by the Daily News’s founders and located in its original offices. She was a columnist for the Post until August 22, 2011, when her final column appeared. Five months later she was once again a columnist for the Daily News, her first column appearing January 25, 2012.

In addition to her newspaper work, Ms. Diamond serves on the Palo Alto board of the American Red Cross. She is also a member of the Rotary Club of Palo Alto and served as its President in 1999. She started the local Rotacare program, a Saturday morning clinic staffed by volunteer doctors and nurses in East Palo Alto. She has also served on a number of other nonprofit boards over the years.
