= Dave Price (publisher) =

American journalist (born 1962)

- Born: 1962 (age 63–64)
- Education: Attended University of Colorado
- Occupations: Journalist, newspaper publisher, freelancer, anchor
- Years active: 1987 – present

Dave Price (born 1962) is an American journalist who has edited, published and founded a number of free daily newspapers including the Daily News and the Daily Post in Palo Alto, California, and the Aspen Times Daily in Aspen, Colorado.

== Background ==
Price began his career at age 15 at the Boulder (Colorado) Daily Camera, where he worked in the composing room and advertising. While at the University of Colorado at Boulder, Price became a stringer for the Denver Post and had more front page bylines in 1983 than any other freelancer at the Post that year. In 1984, Price moved to Aspen, Colorado, and worked as a reporter at the Aspen Daily News. In 1987, Price became news director and morning anchor of KSNO-FM and KTYE-AM.

== Newspaper publisher and editor ==
In 1988, Price returned to the newspaper business. He was asked by the publisher of the Aspen Times weekly, Bil Dunaway, to launch a free daily newspaper to compete against the Aspen Daily News. On November 9, 1988, he launched the Aspen Times Daily and was that paper's founding editor.

In 1990, Price covered the arrest of gonzo journalist Hunter S. Thompson on sex assault charges. The charges were dropped after Price reported that the alleged victim was an undercover agent who fabricated the assault claim in order to give the district attorney a pretext for searching Thompson's Woody Creek ranch for drugs. Thompson reprinted some of Price's stories in his 1990 book Gonzo Papers, Vol. 3: Songs of the Doomed: More Notes on the Death of the American Dream and included Price on the book's Honor Roll.

In 1992, Price moved to suburban Cleveland, Ohio, where he was city editor of the Morning Journal.

In 1995, Price relocated in Northern California and co-founded the Palo Alto Daily News, another free daily newspaper. Within nine months the Daily News was in the black. At first, the Daily News was ignored or ridiculed by its competitors in the San Francisco Bay Area. However, the Daily News expanded and opened additional editions in the nearby cities of Redwood City, Burlingame, San Mateo and Los Gatos. The success of the Daily News inspired four copycat free dailies in the Bay Area.

In 2005, the parent company of the rival San Jose Mercury News, Knight Ridder, purchased the Palo Alto Daily News and its four sister papers for $25 million. Price remained as publisher and, in May 2005, helped to start the East Bay Daily News, a free daily serving Berkeley, California, and surrounding areas. Price retired from the Daily News in December 2005.

In 2006, Price and Jim Pavelich started a free daily newspaper in San Francisco, California, the San Francisco Daily, later known as the Daily Post. With an initial press run of 5,000 copies per day and a staff of eight, the new paper used the same business model as the Palo Alto Daily News, which emphasized low cost, effective advertising for small businesses and, on the news side, aggressive local coverage coupled with a summary of news from outside the community. It ceased publication in 2009.

In May 2008 Price and Palo Alto Daily News announced the creation of the Daily Post, at the old offices of the Daily News in downtown Palo Alto. The first announced employee was former Daily News editor Diana Diamond, later a columnist at the Palo Alto Weekly.

The New York Times did an in-depth report on the competition among Palo Alto newspapers, and much of the article focused on Price, who was described as a contrarian. Price said he considered the term a badge of honor.

Price lives in Palo Alto, California, with his wife and their son.

== Awards ==
- For two consecutive years (2003 and 2004), Price won the first place award for editorial writing from the California Newspaper Publishers Association for newspapers with a circulation between 25,001 and 75,000. In 2002, Price was second in this category.
- In 2001, Price won a first-place prize from the Peninsula Press Club for editorial writing, and his newspapers won nine awards from the PPC—of which he happens to be director and website editor.
- In 2002, Price won a first-place prize from the PPC for page design, an honorable mention for another entry in the same category, and a second-place trophy for editorial writing. His newspapers won 20 awards from the club.
- In 2003, Price won a second-place award for editorial writing and an honorable mention for headline writing from the PPC. His newspaper won 10 PPC awards.
- In 2004, Price won a second-place award from the PPC for the web site www.paloaltodailynews.com and an honorable mention for editorial writing. His papers won 21 awards from the PPC.
- In 2008, Price won third-place awards for headline writing and page design for work at the San Francisco Daily (now known as the Daily Post).
- In 2010, Price won first-place awards for editorial writing and headline writing in the Greater Bay Area Journalism Awards. In the same contest, he also won the second-place award for headline writing, and shared a second-place award for news series and third-place award for continuing coverage.
- In 2011, Price won first-place and second-place awards for headline writing and a second-place for editorial writing in the Greater Bay Area Journalism contest. In the same contest, which was open to all Bay Area newspapers, The Post won eight awards.
