= Rosenblatt v. Baer =

1966 United States Supreme Court case

- Supreme Court of the United States

Argued October 20, 1965 Decided February 21, 1966
- Full case name: Rosenblatt v. Baer
- Citations: 383 U.S. 75 (more) 86 S. Ct. 669; 15 L. Ed. 2d 597; 1966 U.S. LEXIS 2847

Questions presented
- Does a government official have to prove that defamatory statements were made in actual malice to succeed in a libel action?

Holding
- An otherwise impersonal attack on governmental operations cannot be used to establish defamation of those administering such operations absent evidence that the implication of wrongdoing was read as specifically directed at the plaintiff, whether he is considered a public official or a member of a group responsible for governmental operations, and whether or not others were also implicated. The trial judge's instruction was erroneous to the extent that it authorized the jury to award respondent damages without regard to evidence that the asserted implication of the column was made with specific reference to him.

Court membership
- Chief Justice Earl Warren Associate Justices Hugo Black · William O. Douglas; Tom C. Clark · John M. Harlan II; William J. Brennan Jr. · Potter Stewart; Byron White · Abe Fortas

Case opinions
- Majority: Brennan, joined by Warren, White; Harlan (except part II); Douglas (part II)
- Concurrence: Clark
- Concurrence: Douglas
- Concurrence: Stewart
- Concur/dissent: Black, joined by Douglas
- Concur/dissent: Harlan
- Dissent: Fortas (jurisdictional) (Note: "A jurisdictional dissent is when the justice disagrees with the Court's assertion or denial of jurisdiction. Such votes are counted as nonparticipations.")

Rosenblatt v. Baer, 383 U.S. 75 (1966), was a United States Supreme Court case regarding the First Amendment to the United States Constitution.

== Background ==
In January 1960, a newspaper column by Alfred D. Rosenblatt published in the Laconia Evening Citizen criticized the fiscal management of a county recreation area, primarily used as a ski resort and supervised by Frank P. Baer as a Belknap County government employee, stating "What happened to all the money last year? and every other year?" Baer, who had been fired as supervisor in July 1959, brought a civil libel claim in New Hampshire state court against Rosenblatt.

In April 1963, a jury in New Hampshire Superior Court awarded Baer damages in the amount of $31,500. The New Hampshire Supreme Court affirmed the award in October 1964. Between the original case and an appeal brought by Rosenblatt, the United States Supreme Court had decided New York Times Co. v. Sullivan, (Note: The New York Times Co. v. Sullivan decision was issued in March 1964.) in which they held that a state cannot award damages to a public official for a defamatory falsehood relating to official conduct unless the official can show actual malice.

In March 1965, the United States Supreme Court agreed to hear the case. In October 1965, the case was argued before the court by Arthur H. Nighswander for the petitioner (Rosenblatt) and Stanley M. Brown for the respondent (Baer). The American Civil Liberties Union (ACLU) filed an amicus brief, urging reversal of the original decision.

== Opinion of the Court ==
In an 8–0 decision issued in February 1966, the Court reversed the decision of the New Hampshire Supreme Court. It argued that there was a probability that Baer was a public official and therefore would be required to show actual malice in the depictions presented by the newspaper. It was left to the trial judge to decide whether Baer qualified as a public official.

Associate Justice Abe Fortas stated in a jurisdictional dissent, "I would vacate the writ [of certiorari] in this case as improvidently granted," as the original trial had occurred before New York Times Co. v. Sullivan was decided.

== Resolution ==
The New Hampshire Supreme Court issued a ruling in December 1967 that Baer was entitled to a jury trial to determine if, in the context of the alleged libel, Baer was acting as a public official, coincident with a trial to determine merits of the libel case. However, the matter was ultimately resolved through an out of court settlement in March 1968.
