= Area News Group =

American newspaper publisher

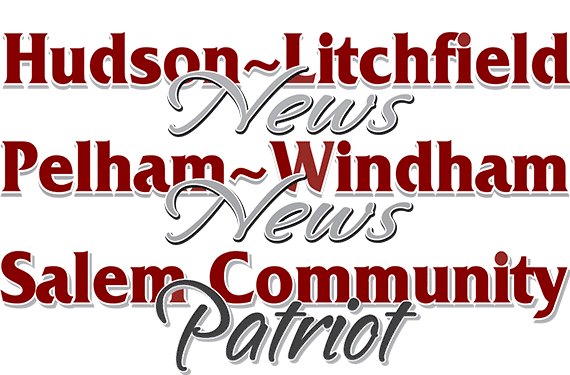
- Mastheads of Area News Group newspapers.
- Type: Weekly newspapers
- Format: Broadsheet
- Owner(s): Michael Elizabeth & Moore, Limited
- Editor: Len Lathrop
- Founded: 2000
- Headquarters: 17 Executive Drive, Suite One, Hudson New Hampshire 03051 United States
- Circulation: 36,300+
- Website: areanewsgroup.com

Area News Group publishes three newspapers in southern New Hampshire: Hudson-Litchfield News, Pelham-Windham News, and Salem Community Patriot. It was founded in 2000 when it purchased the Hudson-Litchfield News, and has since added the other papers.

The local weekly papers are supported by advertisers and are distributed to town residents free of charge. The company is headquartered in Hudson, New Hampshire on Executive Drive. Len Lathrop is the Publisher and Editor in Chief. The company won the "Small Business of the Year" award from the local chamber of commerce in 2012.

The papers place a large emphasis on publishing local news on issues in town and state government, education, local organization's activities, high school sports, and other topics. The Hudson-Litchfield News has done investigative reporting that has been picked up by other local news outlets, has published cartoons satirizing local public officials, and is a venue for legal notices.

The Hudson-Litchfield News and Pelham-Windham News each run a popular, long-running vox populi column called "Thumbs Up Thumbs Down" where readers share opinions on local issues as a "thumbs up" (in support of a local issue or in recognition of a good deed) or "thumbs down" (in opposition to a local issue or expressions of anger or disappointment). In 2008 ANG went to court to resist a subpoena from suspended Litchfield police chief Joseph O'Brion, who sought the identity of an unnamed source. The competing Nashua Telegraph supported ANG in resisting the subpoena. Columns printed in that year also impacted the relationships among Hudson public officials.

Until 2010, the Hudson-Litchfield News was printed on the presses of the Nashua Telegraph.

In 1991, three town council members in Hudson purchased the Hudson-Litchfield News, igniting concerns about conflict of interest in local and national news outlets and prompting a lawsuit. In 1999 Fidele J. Bernasconi, one of the owners named as a defendant in the lawsuit, published an op-ed in the neighboring New Hampshire Union Leader as part of a campaign around special education funding. Bernasconi retired as publisher around the time of the acquisition.

== Other Southern New Hampshire newspapers ==
- Nashua Telegraph
- New Hampshire Union Leader
