= Valley News =

Daily newspaper serving Lebanon, New Hampshire and White River Junction, Vermont, US

- Type: Daily newspaper
- Format: Broadsheet
- Owner: Newspapers of New England
- Publisher: Dan McClory
- Editor: Matt Clary
- Founded: 1952
- Headquarters: 24 Interchange Drive, West Lebanon, New Hampshire
- ISSN: 1072-6179
- Website: vnews.com

The Valley News is a six-day morning daily newspaper based in Lebanon, New Hampshire, covering the Upper Valley region of New Hampshire and Vermont, in the United States.

Although the newspaper's offices are in Lebanon, its mailing address is a post office box in nearby White River Junction, Vermont. The newspaper covers communities on both sides of the Connecticut River, which forms the state line. The paper's circulation is 16,522. The current editor is Matt Clary.

The paper was founded in 1952 by Allan Churchill Butler. Shortly thereafter he sold the paper to James D. Ewing and Walter Paine. Paine would serve as editor and publisher of the paper for twenty-four years. In 2012, the Valley News, the Nashua Telegraph, and PolitiFact established "PolitiFact '12 NH," a fact-checking effort focused on the candidates in the 2012 United States presidential election. At the time, Jeffrey Good was the Valley News' editor.

Newspapers of New England, a private company based in Concord, New Hampshire, bought the Valley News in 1981 and has owned it since.

Until the end of 2023, the Valley News was published seven days a week. The Sunday Valley News was last published December 31, 2023. Starting on January 6, 2023, a Weekend edition was published on Saturday. It included the recurring items from both Saturday and Sunday, e.g., the daily comics for Saturday and the usual Sunday comics.

== Editorial positions ==
The Valley News has editorialized in support of same-sex marriage.
