= Milford Cabinet =

- Type: Weekly newspaper
- Owner(s): Cabinet Press
- Founded: 1802
- Headquarters: Milford, New Hampshire
- Website: cabinet.com

The Milford Cabinet is the commonly used name for the weekly newspaper The Cabinet, published in Milford, New Hampshire since 1802.

The Cabinet was published for many decades by members of the Rotch family. In 2005, The Telegraph of Nashua bought the Cabinet Press, which also publishes three free weekly papers: Merrimack Journal, Hollis-Brookline Journal and Bedford Journal. In April 2013, The Telegraph and its weekly papers were bought by Ogden Newspapers of Wheeling, West Virginia.
