= Walter Paine =

American writer

Walter Cabot Paine
- Born: May 9, 1923
- Died: October 4, 2018 (aged 95)
- Occupations: Journalist, Publisher, Author
- Notable credit: Valley News

Walter Paine (May 9, 1923 – October 4, 2018) was an American author, journalist, and publisher.

Paine, a former editorial writer for the Baltimore Sun, met James D. Ewing, who was interested in purchasing a newspaper, and in October 1954, they purchased the Keene Sentinel, in Keene, New Hampshire. In 1956, they purchased the Valley News of Lebanon, New Hampshire, and five years later they purchased the Argus-Champion. In 1980, Ewing, sold his interest in the Valley News. Ewing took over full control of the Sentinel, and Paine continued to serve as editor and publisher of the Valley News for twenty-four years.

In 1957 in his role as Valley News editor, Paine mounted an investigation into the transparency and practices of the managers of the town of Lebanon that led to the shift to a town council form of government there.

Paine became the first stockholder of Ascutney Mountain Resort of Brownsville, Vermont in 1957 and majority owner in 1961; he owned the Resort for more than ten years, selling it on October 3, 1972. He was a cofounder of the Montshire Museum of Science of Norwich, Vermont.

In 2006 his children's book Cousin John: The Story of a Boy and a Small Smart Pig was published by Bunker Hill.

Paine died on October 4, 2018, aged 95, at his home on Mascoma Lake.
