= Oscar R. Ewing =

American lawyer and government official

Oscar Ewing
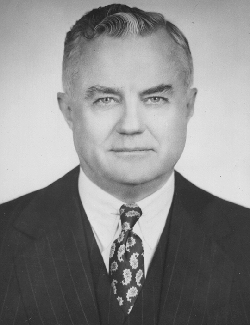

3rd Administrator of the Federal Security Agency
- In office August 19, 1947 – January 20, 1953
- President: Harry S. Truman
- Preceded by: Watson Miller
- Succeeded by: Oveta Culp Hobby

Personal details
- Born: March 8, 1889 Greensburg, Indiana, U.S.
- Died: January 8, 1980 (aged 90) Chapel Hill, North Carolina, U.S.
- Party: Democratic
- Spouse(s): Helen Dennis (m. 1915; died 1953) Mary Whiting MacKay Thomas (m. 1955)
- Children: 2, including James
- Education: Indiana University, Bloomington (BA); Harvard University (LLB)

Military service
- Allegiance: United States
- Branch/service: United States Army
- Years of service: 1917–1919
- Rank: Captain
- Unit: U.S. Army Signal Corps; U.S. Army Air Service
- Battles/wars: World War I

Oscar R. Ewing (March 8, 1889 – January 8, 1980) was a 20th-century American lawyer, social reformer, and politician who was one of the main authors of the Fair Deal program of U.S. President Harry S. Truman.

== Background ==
Oscar Ross Ewing was born on March 8, 1889, in Greensburg, Indiana. His parents were George McClellan Ewing and Nettie Ross Ewing.

In 1910, he graduated from Indiana University Bloomington. In 1913, he graduated from Harvard Law School.

== Career ==
=== Private practice ===
Ewing first taught at the University of Iowa Law School. Then, he joined a firm in Indianapolis.

During World War I, he served in the U.S. Army and left as captain.

In 1920, he joined the law firm of Hughes, Schurman and Dwight in New York City. In 1937, he co-founded Hughes, Hubbard and Ewing, where he remained until 1947.

In 1942, he became a special U.S. prosecutor who won the conviction of William Dudley Pelley, leader of the Silver Shirts, for sedition. In 1947, he won the convictions of Douglas Chandler and Robert Best on charges of treason, both of whom had broadcast for the Nazis during World War II.

=== Government service ===
By 1940, Ewing had become assistant chairman of the Democratic National Committee; in 1942, he came vice chairman until he stepped down in 1947.

In the Winter of 1946–1947, after the Republicans swept mid-term elections, Ewing began holding quiet meetings at his home in Washington that lead to formulation of Truman's Fair Deal. Participants included: Clark M. Clifford, then Truman's special counsel (later, last Secretary of Defense under President Lyndon B. Johnson); Leon Keyserling of the Council of Economic Advisers and advocate of planned economic growth; C. Girard Davidson, assistant secretary of U.S. Department of Interior; David A. Morse, Assistant Secretary of the U.S. Department of Labor; and Charles S. Murphy, an Administrative Assistant to Truman. In 1948, the Fair Deal helped Truman defeat Governor Thomas E. Dewey.

In 1947, Truman appointed him administrator of the Federal Security Agency (FSA–now the U.S. Department of Health and Human Services). In 1948, Clifford and he were in charge of Truman's "whistle stop" tour. As head of FSA until 1952, he promoted civil rights, extended federal welfare programs, and broadened Social Security coverage. He opened the old Gallinger Hospital in Washington, DC, to African-American doctors. He advocated for a national health plan.

Ewing is credited as the organizer and leader of this unofficial policy group of Truman's, though some other members changed (1947–1952). They also supported recognition of Israel (1948), Truman's veto of the Taft–Hartley Act (1947), and a "welfare state."

=== Return to private practice ===
In 1952, Ewing returned to private law practice. In 1960, he moved to Chapel Hill, where he served as a director of the Research Triangle Foundation until 1989. From 1963 to 1967, he was also chairman of the Research Triangle Regional Planning Commission.

== Private and death ==
Ewing had a close, personal friendship with Truman.

On November 4, 1915, he married Helen E. Dennis. They had two sons, George and James D. Ewing. She died in 1953. In 1955, he married Mary Whiting MacKay Thomas.

He died of ischemia complicated by pneumonia on January 8, 1980, at home in Chapel Hill, North Carolina.

== External sources ==
- Harry S. Truman Library & Museum: Oscar R. Ewing Papers

Political offices
Preceded by Watson Miller	Administrator of the Federal Security Agency; 1947–1953	Succeeded by Oveta Culp Hobby
