= James D. Ewing =

American newspaper publisher

James Dennis Ewing
- Born: January 14, 1917; St. Louis, Missouri
- Died: January 21, 2002
- Education: Princeton University
- Title: Publisher and co-owner, The Keene Sentinel
- Spouse: Ruth Dewing
- Awards: Yankee Quill Award

James D. Ewing (January 14, 1917 – January 21, 2002) was an American newspaper publisher, government reform advocate and philanthropist. He spent nearly 40 years as publisher and co-owner of The Keene Sentinel in Keene, New Hampshire.

In 1984, Ewing, along with Thomas Winship, an editor at The Boston Globe, and George Krimsky, an Associated Press correspondent and editor, helped to establish the International Center for Journalists. It is a non-profit that works with journalists from all over the world. One notable trainee, who spent some of his time in training at the newspaper in 1987, was Hamid Karzai. He went on to become the first democratically elected president of Afghanistan.

In 1981, Ewing was selected to be a nominating judge for Pulitzer Prizes in journalism. Ewing was inducted into the Newspaper Hall of Fame by the New England Newspaper & Press Association, recognized for his outstanding professionalism and accomplishments.

== Education ==
James Dennis Ewing was born on January 14, 1917, in St. Louis, Missouri. His parents were Oscar R. Ewing and Helen (Dennis) Ewing. He attended preparatory school at the Hotchkiss School in Connecticut and graduated from Princeton University in 1938. Ewing went on to attend Harvard Law School for one year. He received honorary degrees from Keene State College, Franklin Pierce College and the University of New Hampshire.

== Background and career ==
After graduating from Princeton in 1938, Ewing attended Harvard Law for a year, before leaving to teach Latin and Greek at the Taft School in Watertown, Connecticut. In 1942, after two years of teaching, he left to work for the National War Labor Board in Washington, D.C., during World War II. He met and married his wife, Ruth Dewing, in September 1943.

Ewing had previously been denied enlistment into the Navy due to his eyesight but was accepted on his second attempt and assigned to labor relations in Detroit. There, he and his wife met Russell H. Peters, a journalist who had worked with the Omaha Daily Bee and the Seattle Post-Intelligencer. Together, they formed a partnership and in 1946 they purchased the Bangor Daily Commercial (also known as the Bangor Evening Commercial), a newspaper in Maine. The Ewings became sole owners of the Bangor Commercial after Peters sold his interest to them in 1952. However, in January 1954 the operation was shuttered due to financial losses; publication of the Bangor Sunday Commercial lasted from 1953 to 1954.

Shortly afterwards, the Ewings met Walter Paine, and in October 1954, they purchased the Keene Evening Sentinel from the family of John Prentiss, who had recently died. In 1956 the Ewings and Paine purchased the Valley News in Lebanon, New Hampshire, and five years later they purchased the Argus-Champion in New London, New Hampshire. In 1961, Ewing received an Honorable Mention in the Svellon Brown Awards, the award recognizes an individual for producing journalism of distinction.

The Ewings sold their interest in the Valley News in 1980 and took over full ownership of the Sentinel; In 1981 they sold their interest in the Argus-Champion. James and Ruth retired from the newspaper business in 1993, after selling the Sentinel to their nephew, Thomas Ewing.

== Politics and philosophy ==
James Ewing was a strong supporter of Edmund S. Muskie and earlier, in the 1952 primary, the Bangor Commercial was the only area newspaper to voice opposition to Ralph Owen Brewster. In a 1999 interview, Ewing was asked to describe his political philosophy; the conversation was in the context of the Bangor Commercial and his opposition to Brewster. Ewing responded that he considered himself as an independent but on the liberal side and added that the more forward, or liberal thinking came from the Republicans at that time, not from the Democratic Party. He went on to describe how his newspaper went after Brewster's "hammer and tongs" in opposition to him, and a lot of what they had printed was picked up and reprinted by the opposing campaign. Brewster, himself, cited Ewing as a significant contributor to his defeat. In an interview, Kay Cutler, a good friend of the Ewings, referred to the defeat as the Bangor Daily Commercial's "shining hour". Time magazine described the Commercial as "an independent, liberal voice in the conservative woods of Maine journalism."

During his time with the Sentinel, he successfully pushed for improvements to the New Hampshire welfare department, public housing, and revisions to Keene's city charter, including freedom of information laws.

Ewing believed that a newspaper had an obligation to inform its readers and help them make responsible decisions. He maintained a larger newsroom that was outside of industry standards and insisted on printing a large share of international articles, in adherence to his belief that the readers should be exposed to other parts of a "shrinking world".

== Awards and recognition ==
- 1961 - Honorable Mention in the Svellon Brown Awards, for meritorious and distinguished service to its public, New England Newspaper and Press Association
- 1987 - Yankee Quill Award, Society of Professional Journalists, for outstanding contributions to New England journalism
- New Hampshire Award from the New Hampshire Press Association
- New England Newspaper Hall of Fame, New England Newspaper and Press Association, James D. Ewing, The Keene Sentinel

== Philanthropic works ==
- The James D. Ewing Lecture on Ethics in Journalism, at Duke University, endowed by Ewing
- Co-founder, International Center for Journalists
- The Ruth and James Ewing Arts Awards
- New Hampshire Humanities Council, founded in 1973
