= Montshire Museum of Science =

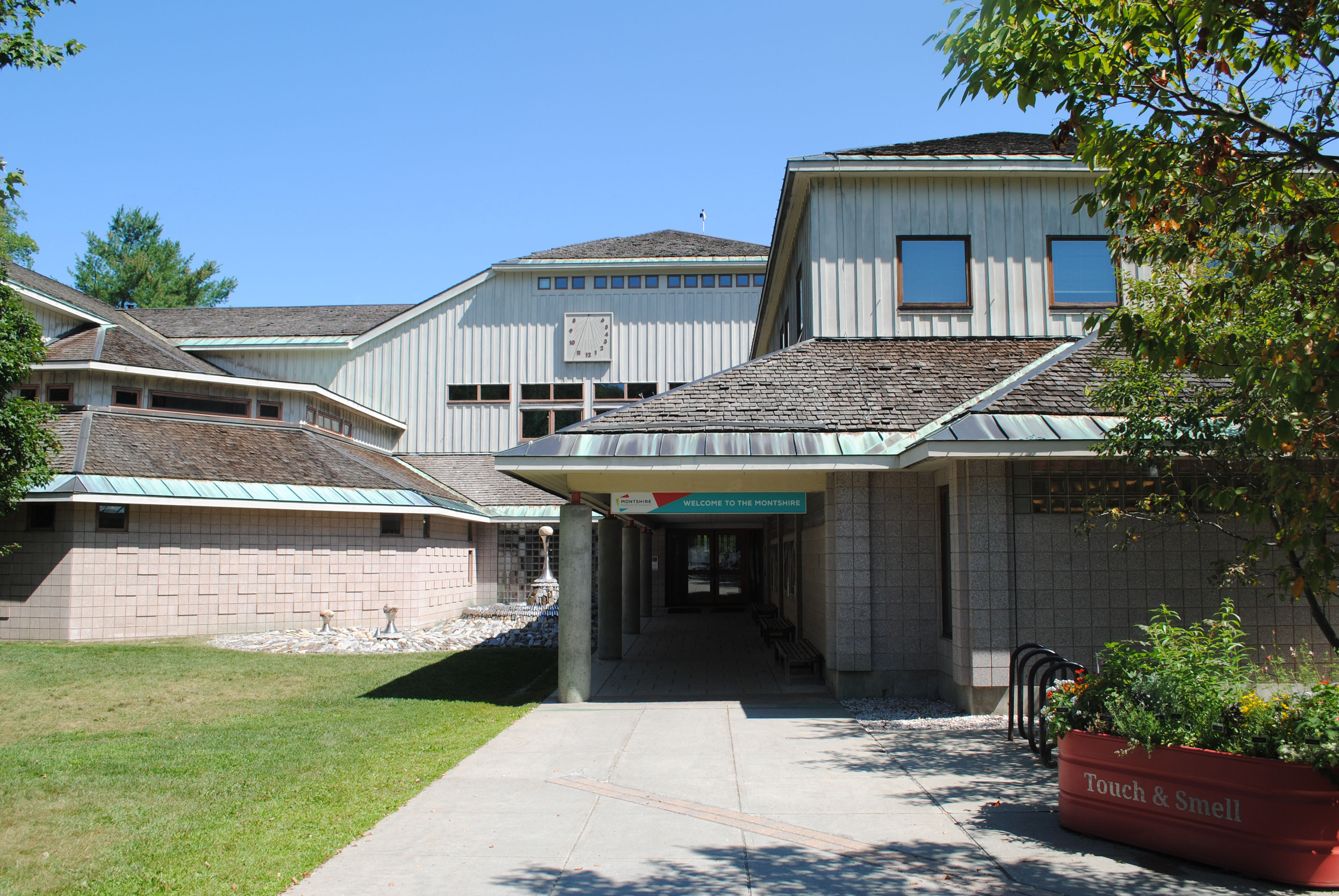
- Main entrance of the Montshire Museum of Science in Norwich, Vermont
- Established: 1976
- Location: 1 Montshire Road; Norwich, Vermont, US
- Coordinates: 43.7002°N 72.305°W
- Type: Science museum
- Accreditation: ASTC
- Visitors: 150,000
- Founder: Dr. Robert Chaffee
- Director: Lara Litchfield-Kimber
- Public transit access: Advance Transit Green Route, plus 9-minute walk
- Website: www.montshire.org

The Montshire Museum of Science is a hands-on science museum located in Norwich, Vermont, United States.

== History ==
The name "Montshire" is a portmanteau of "Vermont" and "New Hampshire". It was cofounded in 1974 by Dr. Robert Chaffee, former Museum Director of the Dartmouth College Museum.

When the college museum closed, Chaffee and Walter Paine devised a community museum and education center, incorporating it as the Montshire. In 1976, Dartmouth College donated the collection of biological and geological collections to the new museum.

The Montshire Museum was first located in a former bowling alley building in 1976 in Hanover, New Hampshire, and was later moved across the Connecticut River to a purpose-built building in Norwich in 1989.

== Description ==
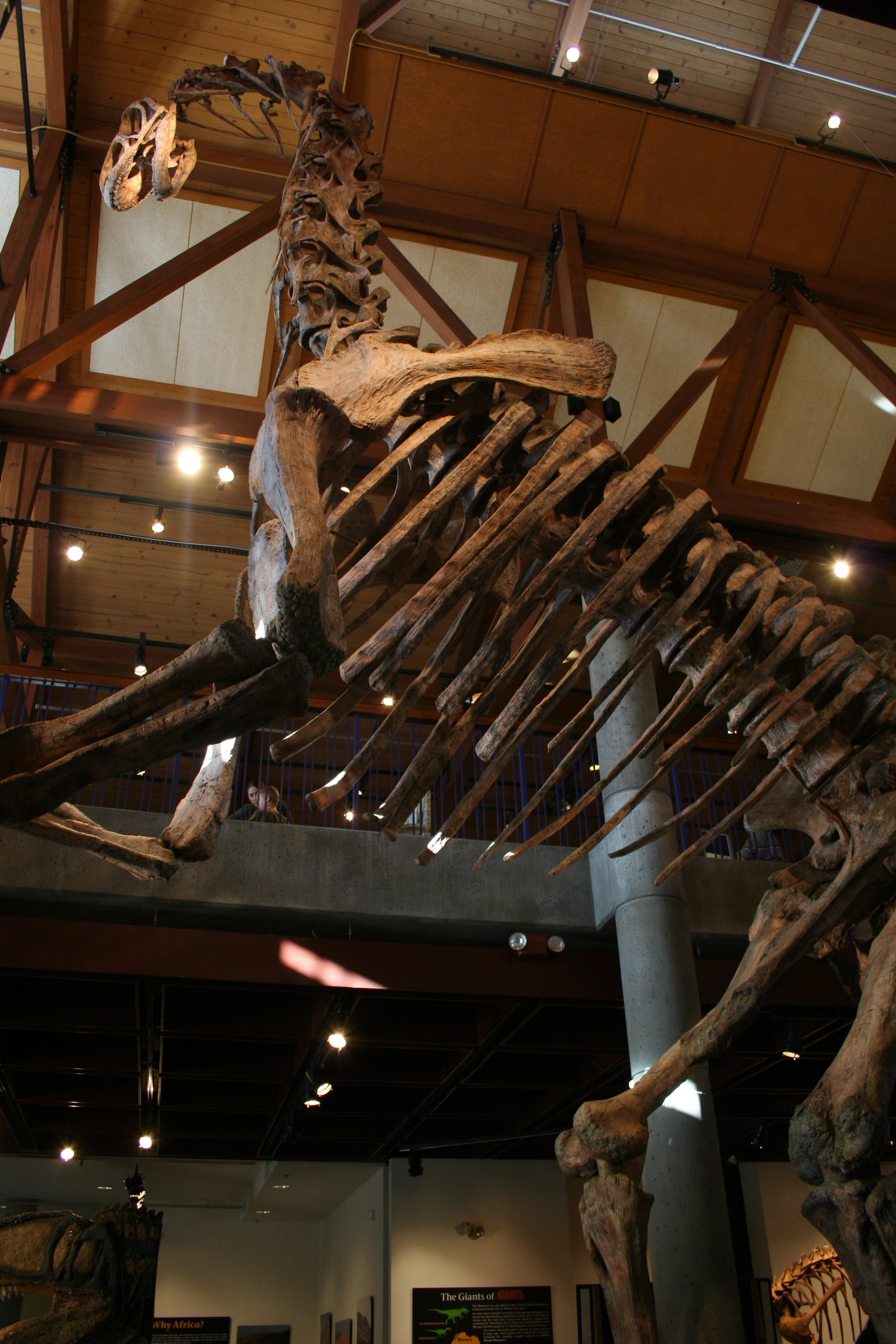

The museum, including the building and nature trails, is located on over 100 acres (40 ha) of land. It has over 150 exhibits relating to the natural and physical sciences, ecology, and technology. Its live animal exhibits include a hive of honeybees that is connected to the outdoors, a colony of leafcutter ants, and aquariums that feature life in local waters.

Outside the museum building, there is a 3-acre (1.2 ha) Science Park including a scale model of the Solar System (Pluto is located 2 miles (3.2 km) away), and interactive exhibits on water, light, sound, and motion. Among the sound exhibits there are "whisper dishes" (parabolic dishes 40 feet (12 m) apart) and a musical fence built by Paul Matisse, grandson of painter Henri Matisse. Each year, the museum holds an annual igloo build.
