= Colin Manning =

American politician

Colin Manning was New Hampshire Governor John Lynch's Press Secretary starting on December 18, 2006. He stayed on with Lynch until Lynch's final year in office in 2012, at which point, according to Kevin Landrigan, Manning left for a communications position at Harvard, which he started on October 29 of that year.

Before Manning was Lynch's Press Secretary, he was the statehouse reporter for Foster's Daily Democrat from 2002 to 2006. Prior to that, from 1999 to 2002 he was a correspondent for the Manchester Union Leader. Manning was also a contributor to WMUR's Sunday morning public affairs program "Closeup."

He is a 1997 graduate of the University of New Hampshire.

== See also ==
- New Hampshire State House press
