= Southbridge News =

Newspaper published in Southbridge

- Type: Weekly newspaper
- Owner: Stonebridge Press, Inc.
- Publisher: Frank G. Chilinski
- Founded: 1923
- Headquarters: 25 Elm Street, Southbridge, Massachusetts 01550 United States
- Price: US$0.60
- ISSN: 2998-632X
- Website: stonebridgepress.com

The Southbridge News is a weekly newspaper in Southbridge, Massachusetts. It is owned by Stonebridge Press, a group that includes twelve weekly newspapers in central Massachusetts and northeastern Connecticut. It was formerly an afternoon daily newspaper under the name Southbridge Evening News.

== The News ==
The News, headquartered in the historical Tiffany Leonard House downtown, steps from Town Hall, focuses its coverage on the "tri-community" towns of Southbridge, Sturbridge and Charlton.

The newspaper is sold at newsstands and through the US Mail. It is printed in Southbridge, in Building 25 of the former American Optical Company plant.
