= Metro (Italian newspaper) =

Italian free newspaper

- Front page (Rome edition), 7 March 2024
- Type: Free daily newspaper (Published from Monday to Friday)
- Format: Tabloid
- Owner: New Media Enterprise
- Founded: July 2000
- Ceased publication: 20 December 2024
- Language: Italian
- Headquarters: Milan, Italy
- Circulation: 1,463,000 (2012)

Metro was an Italian free daily newspaper published in Italy from 2000 until 2024.

== History and profile ==
Metro was originally published by Metro International. Ten separate editions would eventually be produced for the cities of Bergamo, Bologna, Genoa, Florence, Milan, Padua, Rome, Turin, Venice and Verona, with other special editions (Metro Mag, Metro Stadio, Metro Week).

It was the most read free daily newspaper in Rome and Milan and one of the most read nationally. It was also one of two major free newspapers in Italy, the other being Leggo. In the period of 2001-2002 Metro had a circulation of 414,000 copies. In 2012 the circulation of the paper was 1,463,000 copies. Multiple reductions in its staff had been made since; in its last years, it only published a national edition and a Milan edition.

It also featured the Get Fuzzy comic strip, translated into Italian.

The Italian version of the newspaper was sold multiple times during its final years: it was acquired by New Media Enterprise, a company run by freelance journalist Salvatore Puzzo, in 2009; shortly afterward, it was sold to printer Mario Farina, who had also published another free daily newspaper, DNews. The company ceased publication for three months before being reacquired by Puzzo in May 2020.

On 23 December 2024, the newspaper and its website were discontinued; its final issue was published three days earlier.
