= Rochester Times =

The Rochester Times is a newspaper in Rochester, New Hampshire, United States. It has been published since the 1900s.
