= The Conway Daily Sun =

Free five-day-a-week newspaper in North Conway, New Hampshire

- The July 27, 2005, front page of The Conway Daily Sun
- Type: Free daily newspaper
- Format: Tabloid
- Owner(s): Country News Club, Inc.
- Publisher: Mark Guerringue
- Editor: Adam Hirshan
- Founded: 1989
- Headquarters: 64 Seavey Street; North Conway, New Hampshire 03860; United States
- Circulation: 16,100 in 2005
- Price: Free
- Website: conwaydailysun.com

The Conway Daily Sun is a three-day (Tuesday, Thursday, Saturday) free daily newspaper published in North Conway, New Hampshire, United States, covering the Mount Washington Valley. It has been published since 1989 by Country News Club, and was the forerunner of three other Daily Sun newspapers in New Hampshire and Maine.

The Conway Daily Sun was the first newspaper outside of Japan to publish the popular numbers puzzle Sudoku, in September 2004.

== Today ==
Mark Guerringue, one of the three founders of Country News Club, still serves as publisher of The Conway Daily Sun as of early 2012.

The Daily Sun circulates in several towns of Carroll County, New Hampshire, including Albany, Bartlett (including Glen), Conway (including Intervale and North Conway), Eaton, Freedom, Jackson, Madison (including Silver Lake), Moultonborough, Tamworth (including Chocorua), Ossipee and Wolfeboro; and two towns in Oxford County, Maine: Fryeburg and Lovell.

Citing advertisement revenue issues, The Conway Daily Sun printed its final Monday edition on October 26, 2009. The paper continues to be published Tuesday through Saturday.

== Sisters and competitors ==
Conway was the first free daily to be launched by Dave Danforth, Mark Guerringue and Adam Hirshan. It was joined a few years later by The Berlin Daily Sun. In 2000, Guerringue and Hirshan partnered with Ed Engler to launch The Laconia Daily Sun in the neighboring Lakes Region of New Hampshire. In 2009, Guerringue and Hirshan teamed with Curtis Robinson to start The Portland Daily Sun in Portland, Maine.

No other daily newspaper is based in Carroll County. Country News Club's closest competitor geographically is The Citizen of Laconia.
