= Destak =

Portuguese-language newspaper

- Logo
- Type: Free daily newspaper
- Format: Broadsheet
- Owner: Cofina
- Founded: September 2001
- Language: Portuguese
- Circulation: 69,864 (September–October 2013)
- Website: Destak

Destak is a Portuguese free daily newspaper that runs in Portugal and Brazil. In Portugal, it is distributed in Lisbon, Porto and Coimbra, and also other Portuguese cities. In Brazil, it was distributed in São Paulo, Rio de Janeiro, Brasília, Campinas and Recife. It is the first free newspaper in Portugal (excluding some local publications, such as free university student journals), prior to the Portuguese edition of Metro International. The paper is chiefly offered at rail and subway stations, but also at cafeterias, universities, offices and hospitals. It has also an online newspaper.

== History and profile ==
Destak was launched in September 2001 by António Stilwell Zilhão, Francisco Pinto Barbosa and Gonçalo Sousa Uva as a weekly newspaper, and became a daily newspaper in November 2004. The paper is part of Cofina. Following the Portuguese success Destak was launched in Brazil in the cities of São Paulo, Rio de Janeiro, Brasília, Campinas and Recife.

Destak had a circulation of 90,043 copies in 2011. Between September and October 2013 it was the second most read newspaper with a circulation of 69,864 copies.

== See also ==
- Mundo Universitário
