= Meredith News =

- Type: Weekly newspaper
- Format: Tabloid
- Owner(s): Salmon Press
- Editor: Erin Plummer
- Founded: 1880
- Headquarters: 5 Water Street, Meredith, New Hampshire 03253 United States
- Circulation: 3,000 (as of 2018)
- Website: newhampshirelakesandmountains.com

The Meredith News is a weekly newspaper published in Belknap County, New Hampshire. The newspaper has about 3,000 subscribers across the towns of Meredith, Center Harbor, Sandwich, and Moultonborough, and the city of Laconia. It is owned by Salmon Press LLC.

== History ==
The first issue was published on July 22, 1880, as the Meredith Weekly News. The publisher George F. Sanborn ran the paper from an office on the second floor of his family home. In 1882, Sanborn started an initiative to build a free public library. At the time, most libraries in the state were "private" libraries that only benefited paying members. The library was implemented in the Sanborn home next to the Meredith News office.

One of Meredith's most prominent residents was Bob Montana, a famous cartoonist known best for illustrating the first Archie comics. Montana was good friends with editor Leo Kershaw of the News, and starting in 1947 Archie comic strips became a regular feature in the Meredith newspaper. Each feature was proudly titled "Archie... By Meredith's Bob Montana".
