= The Laconia Daily Sun =

Daily newspaper in New Hampshire, USA

- Type: Daily newspaper
- Format: Tabloid
- Owner(s): Lakes Region News Club, Inc.
- Founder: Edward J. Engler
- Publisher: Adam Hirshan
- Editor: Julie Hirshan Hart
- Founded: June 5, 2000
- Headquarters: 781 Union Avenue, Laconia, New Hampshire 03246 United States
- Circulation: 15,500 (as of 2025)
- Website: laconiadailysun.com

The Laconia Daily Sun is a four-day (Tuesday, Wednesday, Thursday and Saturday) free morning daily newspaper published in the city of Laconia, New Hampshire, United States, covering Belknap County and the Lakes Region. Each publication day, 15,500 copies of the paper are distributed by bulk drops at more than 300 locations. Home delivery is available for a fee. The paper also publishes a free online edition.

The newspaper draws many of its readers from Laconia, but also covers Alton (and Alton Bay), Belmont, Center Harbor, Gilford, Gilmanton, Meredith, Sanbornton and Tilton (including Winnisquam), all in Belknap County.

Lakes Region News Club, Inc., which owns The Laconia Daily Sun, started as a partnership between President Edward J. Engler, Publisher Adam Hirshan and Mark Guerringue, publisher of The Conway Daily Sun.

The Laconia Daily Sun was founded June 5, 2000, with Engler as publisher and John Hourihan as editor. The initial press run was 2,000 copies, and the paper was in direct competition with The (Laconia) Citizen, a paid circulation daily newspaper founded in 1926 and owned at the time by the Robert Foster family of Dover, New Hampshire. The two daily newspapers were head-to-head competitors for more than 16 years, until The (Laconia) Citizen ceased publication on Oct. 1, 2016.

Engler assumed the position of editor in 2002 and held it until November 2015, when he retired and was succeeded by Ginger Kozlowski, formerly editor of The (Laconia) Citizen, (Engler was elected mayor of Laconia in 2013 and again in 2015.) Hirshan and Guerringue were not involved in the day-to-day operations of the newspaper in the early years, but Hirshan took over responsibility for the advertising department in 2006 and added oversight of the front office when he began working full-time in Laconia in 2007. He assumed the publisher's role in 2012.

The newspaper was initially printed by The Conway Daily Sun but began printing with the Dow Jones-owned Seacoast Media Group in Portsmouth, New Hampshire, in 2008 and with the Concord Monitor in 2014. The move to Seacoast Media Group also marked the beginning of a revolutionary "all color all the time" policy whereby display advertising rates were revised to reflect the fact that all display ads in the newspaper would thereafter be printed in full color.

== Sisters and competitors ==
Unlike the original Daily Sun newspapers, The Laconia Daily Sun went head-to-head with an established, paid-subscription daily newspaper on its home turf: The Citizen, based in Laconia (The Citizen ceased publication in October 2016). The first two News Club dailies are the only daily newspapers in their counties: The Conway Daily Sun in Carroll County, and The Berlin Daily Sun in Coos County, New Hampshire. In 2009, News Club founded a fourth free daily, The Portland Daily Sun, in Maine's largest city, which was closed in November 2014, when it acquired the alternative weekly The Portland Phoenix. The Conway Daily Sun also publishes a monthly tourist magazine called North Conway with a distribution of 15,000.
