= Mundo Universitário =

- Type: Weekly newspaper
- Format: Broadsheet
- Owner(s): Moving Media, Publicações, Lda
- Publisher: Grafedisport
- Language: Portuguese
- Headquarters: Estrada da Outurela, nº 118 - Parque Holanda, Ed. Holanda; 2790-114 Carnaxide
- Price: Free
- Website: Mundo Universitário

Mundo Universitário is a Portuguese free newspaper distributed at major universities in mainland Portugal. It was launched by the same founders of Destak in May 2004.
