= Weirs Times =

- Type: Weekly newspaper
- Format: Broadsheet
- Owner(s): Weirs Publishing Company Inc.
- Editor: Brendan Smith
- Founded: 1883
- Headquarters: 515 Endicott Street North, Weirs, Belknap County, NH 03246
- Circulation: 30,000
- OCLC number: 15993584
- Website: weirs.com

The Weirs Times is a free weekly newspaper that features stories about New Hampshire personalities, businesses, and histories. It has over 30,000 weekly readers in the central and eastern regions of the state. Established in 1883, the Times was originally titled Calvert's Weirs Times and Tourists' Gazette. Editor and owner Matthew Calvert published the paper every summer until 1902.

In 1992 Robert M. Lawton revived the paper using the same masthead Calvert used, as well as the copyrighted map of Lake Winnipesaukee that was printed on every issue of Calvert's paper. Lawson is also a former representative to the New Hampshire legislature and owns Funspot, which was named the largest arcade in the world by the Guinness Book of World Records in 2008.
