= Stonebridge Press =

Stonebridge Press, Inc.
- Type: Private
- Industry: Newspapers
- Founded: October 27, 1995
- Headquarters: 25 Elm Street; Southbridge, Massachusetts 01550; United States
- Key people: Ryan Courneau, Business Manager; Jim DiNicola, Operations Manager; Julie Clarke, Production Manager
- Products: Southbridge News and several weekly newspapers in Connecticut and Massachusetts
- Website: www.stonebridgepress.com

Stonebridge Press, Inc. is a privately held newspaper company based in Southbridge, Massachusetts. It was formed October 27, 1995, to operate the newspapers acquired through the purchase of a various newspapers.

In addition to its Massachusetts operations, the company owns the Salmon Press group of weekly newspapers of New Hampshire and also publishes four weekly newspapers in Northeastern Connecticut under the name Villager Newspapers. In total, Stonebridge Press, Inc. publishes 23 newspapers reaching households in Massachusetts, Connecticut, and New Hampshire. The company also publishes niche publications, including "Summer Guide" and "Winter Guide." All Stonebridge Press and Salmon Press products are also available online.

Stonebridge Press is headquartered at the historic Southbridge News building, 25 Elm Street, Southbridge.

== History ==
Former executives with Capital Cities/ABC purchased the newspapers that now make up Stonebridge in a foreclosure sale from Loren F. Ghiglione in 1995. The price was not disclosed.

The deal, brokered by Fidelity Investments' Community Newspaper Company subsidiary—one of Ghiglione's largest creditors—suddenly ended a 26-year run of media expansion described by one observer as "Loren Ghiglione's News Empire".

=== Worcester County Newspapers ===
Ghiglione's quarter-century foray in Central Massachusetts journalism—known in its final years as Worcester County Newspapers—began when he purchased the Southbridge Evening News from its founding McNitt family in 1969. Throughout the 1970s and 1980s, he acquired weekly newspapers, specialty publications and shoppers in adjacent communities, some 20 in all.

In addition to the Southbridge News and what became the Stonebridge weeklies, Worcester County Newspapers included several titles that were eventually folded in the 1990s: The Voice, a weekly covering Boylston, Northborough, Shrewsbury and Westborough, Massachusetts; Wachusett People, a shopper in Holden and West Boylston, Massachusetts; a chain of three Weekender shoppers in southern Worcester County; The Observer Patriot, a weekly in Putnam, Connecticut; and the Jaffrey-Rindge Chronicle in Jaffrey, New Hampshire.

By the end of the decade, however, Ghiglione's "empire" began to look overextended and uneconomic. In 1986 he had paid US$3 million for two state-of-the-art presses at Worcester County Newspapers' Auburn plant. In 1987, he'd bought Worcester Magazine, an alternative newsweekly with a large staff. As the 1990s approached, the region entered an economic recession, tanking demand for commercial printing, while newsprint costs went up. In 1992, the competitor Telegram & Gazette daily in Worcester beefed up its suburban coverage with zoned editions, dealing another setback to Worcester County Newspapers.

=== Attempts to stay afloat ===
Ghiglione attempted to reorganize the company. He had already sold Worcester Magazine in 1990; in early 1995 he shuttered the Shrewsbury and Holden papers. The Southbridge News dropped its Saturday edition and switched to tabloid-sized newsprint. The Auburn printing plant was sold to Community Newspaper Company. Following the loss of the Auburn plant, the remaining newspapers were printed by contract with Turley Publications' presses in Palmer, Massachusetts.

It wasn't enough. Ghiglione was bankrupt, and deeded the company over to Community Newspaper in October, effectively terminating the jobs of his 87 employees. Upon purchase, Stonebridge Press rehired 58 of those employees.

=== Stonebridge Press returns local focus ===
Upon purchase of Ghiglione's newspapers in 1995, the newly named Stonebridge Press refocused the company so that local news once again became the focus of all products. The products remain "relentlessly local."

In 2005, Stonebridge Press expanded into northeastern Connecticut by launching The Putnam Villager, Thompson Villager, Woodstock Villager and Killingly Villager. The Villager name is also used for new weekly Massachusetts newspapers started in July 2007 as The Sturbridge Villager and The Charlton Villager. This time also marked a period of change in circulation and distribution, as the Webster Times, Spencer New Leader, and Blackstone Valley Tribune were converted to free "by request" weeklies, mailed to homes, upon request, in the newspapers' coverage areas. Remaining "relentlessly local" has paid off for the company. Despite the increasingly challenging environment for print newspapers, Stonebridge and Salmon have been successful in outperforming larger daily newspapers and shuttered competitors, even during the economic turbulence of 2008–2011, and the COVID-19 pandemic.
