= Foster's Daily Democrat =

Newspaper in Dover, New Hampshire

- Foster's cover on October 16, 2008
- Type: Daily newspaper
- Format: Broadsheet
- Owner: USA Today Co.
- Publisher: Patrice D. Foster
- Editor: Howard Altschiller
- Founded: 1873
- Circulation: 20,053 Daily; 24,428 Weekend (as of 2006)
- ISSN: 0892-6026
- Website: fosters.com

Foster's Daily Democrat is a five-day (Monday–Friday) evening broadsheet newspaper published in Portsmouth, New Hampshire, United States, covering southeast New Hampshire and southwest Maine.

== History and politics ==
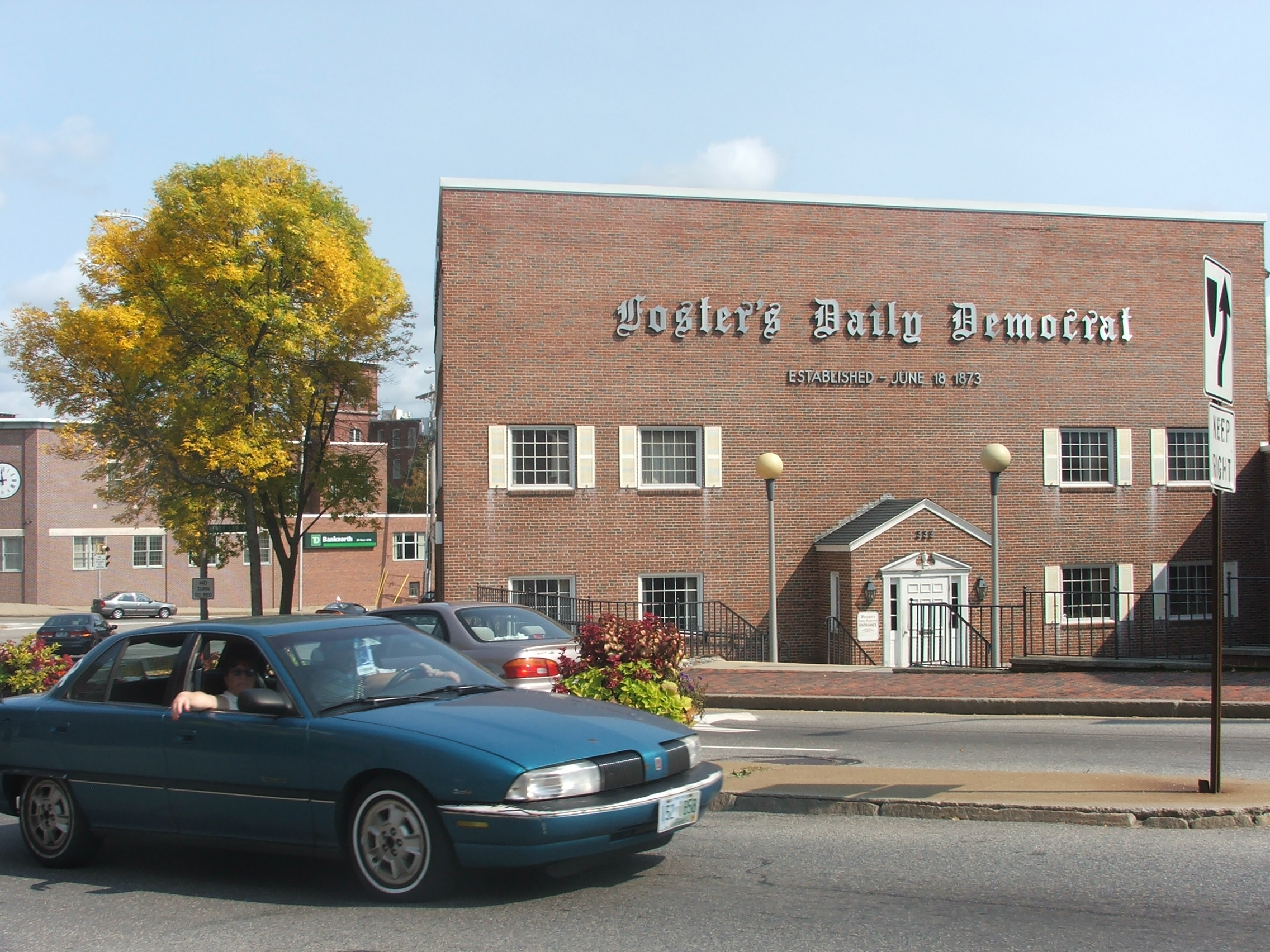
Foster's former headquarters in Dover, New Hampshire

Founded by Joshua L. Foster on June 18, 1873, the paper was named after the U.S. Democratic Party, which then was the conservative and less-popular party in New England. Foster was already known, by then, as a political firebrand and an explicit opponent of President Lincoln; one of his previous publishing ventures had been the States and Union, a pro-slavery paper in nearby Portsmouth, New Hampshire, during the American Civil War.

Foster's Daily Democrat for most of its history was a right-leaning paper but in recent years it has gone far to the left, endorsing Democratic candidates and supporting left-leaning political issues. As recent as 2000, however, Foster's endorsed George W. Bush in the New Hampshire primary, although the paper backed no one in the general election. It also endorsed District 1 Congressman, Jeb Bradley on a number of occasions and it is considered rare for a Democratic candidate to get an endorsement from Foster's. Foster's is in favor of the death penalty.

In the 2004 New Hampshire Democratic primary, the paper endorsed Joe Lieberman, generally considered a more conservative Democrat. Yet its editorial stated that readers should be "absolutely clear on one thing. Foster's Daily Democrat remains fully supportive of President Bush."

In 1988, editor Rodney G. Doherty described himself as a "black sheep" of journalism and said he edits "a blue-collar paper." He said he prefers a hard-news, top-down style of newsroom management, with young reporters filing several quick stories based on assignments from editors, rather than longer, more analytical pieces. He said likes to see reporters write about "what is news, rather than what they think is the news."

Colin Manning, who wrote Foster's statehouse notebook, later went on to be New Hampshire governor John Lynch's communications director.

As of 2009, Doherty is the executive editor of the paper. The managing editor is Mary Pat Rowland. The assistant managing editor is Mike Gillis. The editorial page editor is Jon Breen.

Foster's Daily Democrat was an afternoon publication for 135 years until November 26, 2007, when it switched to morning publication. At the time, Doherty said morning publication would be more convenient for readers, and would allow the paper to update its Website earlier in the day.

In 2014, the Geo. J. Foster Company sold its assets, including Foster's, to Local Media Group. Local Media Group was later merged into GateHouse Media.

In 2016, the paper endorsed Hillary Clinton for president.

== News and features ==
Foster's news focus is mainly on local public meetings and police reporting with community features and local sports also included. Regular features include advice columns, stock tables, classified advertising, comic strips, obituaries, television listings and local lottery numbers. The newspaper also carries entertainment, world and national news from the Associated Press, as well as both AP and locally generated sports stories.

Sections and pullouts for the daily paper include main news and an award-winning sports section every day, plus:

- Local page, every day, which includes Tri-City (Dover, Rochester and Somersworth area news) This page, following a redesign that was completed in November 2007, now constitutes Page B1 daily (Mon-Sat)
- Coast page, every day, which covers the greater Portsmouth area. This page was also part of the redesign in 2007 and runs on Page A3 daily (Mon-Sat)
- Education page, Thursday, with local education news and honor rolls
- Community Weekend, Friday, with event and religion listings
- Showcase, Thursday, with local arts and entertainment news
- Your Home, a local real estate section

== Sisters and competitors ==
Foster's competed head-to-head with The Portsmouth Herald, a daily newspaper based in Portsmouth, New Hampshire. In response to the Herald taking a chip out of Foster's Portsmouth market, Foster's printed a Portsmouth Region page on page A3 or A5. The parent company of the Herald acquired Foster's. Foster's also competes with the statewide daily New Hampshire Union Leader and its sister Sunday paper, New Hampshire Sunday News.

In the late 1990s, the Geo. J. Foster Company launched Foster's Sunday Citizen to compete with Herald Sunday and the New Hampshire Sunday News. The Sunday paper was a joint venture by Foster's and its sister paper in Laconia, New Hampshire, The Citizen, also owned by Geo. J. Foster Company. The Foster company sold The Citizen to Eagle Publishing in June 2010.
