= Palo Alto Daily Post =

Free newspaper in Palo Alto, California

The Daily Post
- You get the most in the Post!

- Type: Free daily newspaper
- Format: Tabloid size, 15.8" x 10.8"
- Owner(s): Dave Price and Jim Pavelich
- Founded: May 27, 2008
- Political alignment: Independent
- Headquarters: 385 Forest Ave, Palo Alto, California
- Website: padailypost.com

The Daily Post is a free newspaper in Palo Alto, California, founded in 2008 by the Palo Alto Daily News's founders, Dave Price and Jim Pavelich, who had sold that paper to new owners three years earlier. The Post is published Monday-Saturday and distributed in more than a dozen communities on the San Francisco Peninsula. The paper covers local news and carries reports from the Associated Press.

The Post was founded by Price and Pavelich, originally occupying the Daily News's old office at 324 High Street in downtown Palo Alto, which the News had vacated when it moved to the outskirts of neighboring Menlo Park. Former Daily News editor Diana Diamond, who was fired by the Daily News in 2006 and later a columnist at the Palo Alto Weekly, was the first employee whom the Daily Post announced hiring. Diamond later left the Post and rejoined the Weekly.

Originally, The Post's website did not carry news stories and only provided information about the paper, such as its address and phone number. Shortly after the paper launched, Pavelich had dismissed the need to publish Post stories online, saying "The Internet is a form of broadcast to me. We're not broadcasters. We just don't have the time to run two businesses," while the website said that "Giving away news online is a dumb way to do business." As of May 2018, The Post website does have news stories, but also recommends that readers get a copy of the print edition to read some stories not published online.
