= The Daily News (Palo Alto) =

- Type: Free weekly newspaper
- Format: Compact / Tabloid
- Owner: MediaNews Group
- Publisher: none
- Editor: Mario Dianda
- Founded: December 7, 1995
- Headquarters: Menlo Park, CA; United States
- Website: www.paloaltodailynews.com

The Daily News, originally the Palo Alto Daily News, is a free newspaper owned by MediaNews Group and located in Menlo Park. Founded in 1995, it was formerly published seven days a week and at one point had a circulation of 67,000 (a figure that included five zoned editions which no longer exist). The Daily News is distributed in red newspaper racks and in stores, coffee shops, restaurants, schools and major workplaces. As of April 7, 2009 the paper ceased to be published as The Palo Alto Daily News and was consolidated with other San Francisco Peninsula Daily News titles; it published five days a week, Tuesday through Saturday. Weekday editions were delivered to selected homes. While continuing to publish daily online, The Daily News cut its print edition back to three days a week in 2013, and one day a week in 2015.

== Format and content ==
Originally, the Daily News had a distinctive format with pages that were 16 inches long and 10.75 inches wide, dimensions which were thought to make the Daily News easier to hold than traditional broadsheet papers, but allow more stories to be published per page than a typical tabloid.

On May 5, 2009, the paper went to a smaller page size (11-1/4 by 11-3/8 inches) to save money. "The change also brands our newspaper as different than the local competition, and makes it easier for our on-the-go readers to carry around," an announcement to readers said. They now have a larger version than their original one, with different sections, like add-ins or inserts.

The newspaper prints a combination of local stories and news from a number of wire services including The Associated Press, Bay City News, The New York Times and McClatchy-Tribune (the former Knight-Ridder Tribune). Local columnists include John Angell Grant, Larry Magid and John Reid. Syndicated opinion columns include those by Bob Herbert, Thomas Friedman and Maureen Dowd.

== History ==
The Palo Alto Daily News debuted on December 7, 1995, with an initial circulation of 3,000. Within nine months, the paper was in the black. The paper original publishers were Jim Pavelich and Dave Price. By 1997, the circulation had nearly tripled to 10,000 copies a day.

On August 9, 2000, the newspaper expanded into San Mateo County by opening three dailies, the San Mateo Daily News, Redwood City Daily News and Burlingame Daily News. These became the first free daily newspapers in San Mateo County, although within two years, other free dailies started in that area, replicating the format of the Daily News.

On May 15, 2002, the Daily News launched the Los Gatos Daily News. In addition to Los Gatos, it served Saratoga, Campbell, Cupertino and western San Jose.

In the first quarter of 2003, the combined circulation of the Daily News reached 55,000 per day, and on March 23 a home-delivered Sunday edition was added.

On February 15, 2005, Knight Ridder, then the nation's second-largest newspaper publisher, bought the Palo Alto Daily News and its four sister papers for $25 million. Price and Pavelich, the publishers, were asked to stay on during the transition, but they left by the end of the year.

In May 2005, the Daily News launched the East Bay Daily News, which served Berkeley, Emeryville, Piedmont, Albany and the Oakland neighborhood of Rockridge.

In January 2006, Shareef Dajani, formerly general manager of the Knight Ridder-owned Hills Newspapers, a group of weeklies in Alameda County, was named publisher. In March, Dajani fired editor Diana Diamond, a long-time Palo Altan who was also a columnist. Her dismissal triggered numerous letters-to-the-editor and the competing Palo Alto Weekly picked up her column. Dajani replaced Diamond with Lucinda Ryan, who had worked with him at the Hills Newspapers.

In March 2006, Knight Ridder agreed to be purchased by The McClatchy Company, owner of the Sacramento Bee among other papers. McClatchy later announced it would sell 12 of the 32 Knight Ridder dailies, including the San Jose Mercury News and two other regional papers, The Monterey County Herald and the Contra Costa Times. The Palo Alto Daily News, along with other papers, was included in the Mercury News' 'bundle,' to be sold as one entity. MediaNews Group, which already owned several area papers, agreed to acquire The Mercury News, Contra Costa Times, Monterey County Herald and the St. Paul Pioneer Press of Minnesota for $1 billion, with $263 million of that coming from the Hearst Corporation, owner of the San Francisco Chronicle. The two deals — the sale of Knight Ridder to McClatchy, and McClatchy's sale to MediaNews — closed in August 2006. However, a lawsuit filed by San Francisco real estate developer Clint Reilly challenged the sale on anti-trust grounds. The suit was settled with Hearst and MediaNews agreeing not to work together on national advertising or distribution.

In January 2007, Dajani was replaced by Carole Leigh Hutton, former editor and publisher of the Detroit Free Press when it was owned by Knight Ridder. When Knight Ridder sold the Free Press to Gannett on August 3, 2005, Hutton was named Knight Ridder's vice president of news, a position she held until the company folded in 2006.

In March 2007, former Oakland Tribune editor Mario Dianda replaced Lucinda Ryan as executive editor.

In May 2008, Daily News founders Dave Price and Jim Pavelich announced that they were reviving the original paper, in its original headquarters at 324 High St., under the name Palo Alto Daily Post.

In June 2008, the Daily News laid off five newsroom workers and eliminated its Monday edition in Palo Alto and its Tuesday edition in San Mateo, Redwood City and Burlingame. Those three cities had lost their Monday edition two years earlier.

In August 2008, it came to light that the Daily News had hired a company in India to manage writing, copy-editing and design of a weekly real-estate product.

In April 2009, the Daily News dropped its Sunday edition and editions for San Mateo, Burlingame and Redwood City.

After McClatchy's acquisition of Knight Ridder in early 2006, all six Daily News editions, were bundled with the San Jose Mercury News and sold to MediaNews Group of Denver, Colorado. The surviving Daily News papers merged on April 7, 2009.
