= The Berlin Sun =

Weekly newspaper in Berlin, United States

- Type: Free newspaper
- Format: Tabloid
- Owner(s): Country News Club, Inc.
- Publisher: Mark Guerringue
- Editor: Lisa Connell
- Founded: 1994
- Language: English
- Headquarters: 177 Main Street, Berlin, New Hampshire 03570 U.S.
- Circulation: 8,500 (as of 2005)
- Website: berlindailysun.com

The Berlin Sun is a weekly free newspaper published Thursdays in the city of Berlin, New Hampshire, U.S., covering "Berlin, Gorham and the North Country". The newspaper started as a five-day-a-week publication under the title The Berlin Daily Sun, gradually reducing frequency to four, then three, and finally two days a week following declines in advertising revenue. The final Saturday edition was published on July 1, 2017, with subsequent issues bearing the moniker The Berlin Sun.

The paper is distributed in Berlin, Gorham, Errol, Milan and Shelburne, New Hampshire, all in Coös County.

It is printed on tabloid paper and published by Country News Club, and was founded in the early 1990s by Mark Guerringue and Adam Hirshan following the success of the similar but larger The Conway Daily Sun. The company now also publishes The Laconia Daily Sun in the Lakes Region of New Hampshire. Local historian and author Paul "Poof" Tardiff began writing articles in this newspaper and later published a three-volume series of books titled Once Upon a Berlin Time, which documents local history. Tardiff continued to write articles weekly until he died on March 13, 2018.
