= The Citizen (Laconia) =

- Type: Daily newspaper
- Format: Broadsheet
- Owner(s): Gallagher-Smith family (1926–1991); Geo. J. Foster Company (1991–2010); Sample News Group (2010–2016)
- Publisher: Kevin Downey
- Editor: Ed Pierce
- Founded: 1926
- Language: English
- Ceased publication: September 30, 2016
- Headquarters: 352 Court Street; Laconia, New Hampshire 03246
- Country: United States

The Citizen was a six-day-a-week, morning daily newspaper in Laconia, New Hampshire, United States. It was the largest paid-subscription local paper serving the Lakes Region of that state. The paper was published from 1926 to 2016.

== History ==
The Citizen was formerly an afternoon paper called the Laconia Evening Citizen and was launched by former Laconia mayor Edward J. Gallagher in 1926. It was owned by Gallagher's daughter, Alma Gallagher Smith, and her husband, Lawrence J. Smith, following Edward Gallagher's death in 1978. The Smiths operated the newspaper until the Geo. J. Foster Company purchased the paper on May 10, 1991. The company was the publisher of Foster's Daily Democrat in Dover, New Hampshire.

In the late 1990s, the Foster Company launched Foster's Sunday Citizen as a joint venture by Foster's Daily Democrat and The Citizen, neither of which previously had a Sunday edition.

In November 2006, The Citizen converted to morning publication; Foster's Daily Democrat followed a year later. The company made the change in order to compete with nearby papers such as the New Hampshire Union Leader and Concord Monitor.

On June 23, 2010, the Foster Company announced that it would sell the paper on June 26, in order to concentrate on their main property, the Dover-based publication. The company said it would continue to print The Citizen and the Laconia edition of the Sunday Citizen at its presses for at least the next three months. The new owner was Sample News Group of Huntingdon, Pennsylvania, publisher of multiple daily and weekly newspapers across the northeastern United States, including The Eagle Times of Claremont, New Hampshire.

Under Sample News Group, The Citizen was managed by Eagle Printing & Publishing of Claremont. Sample News Group suspended publication of The Citizen with its edition of September 30, 2016, citing rising costs in printing and production and inability to find a buyer for the newspaper.

== Features ==
At the time it ceased publication, the Citizen Weekender on Saturdays featured a Local section, which included the History section, a look back at Laconia from 125, 100, 75, 50, 25, and 10 years ago with articles from local newspapers of that time, as well as an old photograph of an area in Laconia (including Weirs Beach and Lakeport) with a description below it, then a current picture of the same area with an updated view. The newspaper also featured a weekly roundup online called "Busted in Belknap", a photo gallery of individuals who had been arrested and incarcerated at the Belknap County jail.

== See also ==
- Rosenblatt v. Baer, a 1966 United States Supreme Court case with origins in an article published in the Laconia Evening Citizen
