= The Telegraph (Nashua, New Hampshire) =

Daily newspaper in Nashua, New Hampshire

- The July 27, 2005 front page of The Telegraph
- Type: Daily newspaper
- Format: Broadsheet
- Owner: Ogden Newspapers
- Publisher: Matthew A. Burdette
- Editor: Matthew A. Burdette
- Founded: October 20, 1832, as New-Hampshire Telegraph
- Headquarters: 110 Main St., Suite 1, Nashua, New Hampshire 03060, United States
- Circulation: 8,250 (as of 2021)
- OCLC number: 22532489
- Website: nashuatelegraph.com

The Telegraph, for most of its existence known as the Nashua Telegraph, is a daily newspaper in Nashua, New Hampshire. It was founded as the Nashua Daily Telegraph in 1869, although a weekly version dates back to 1832. Through the 2000s it was the second-largest newspaper in the state in terms of daily print circulation, behind the New Hampshire Union Leader of Manchester.

In 2020 The Telegraph reduced its print run to Saturday only, when it produces a weekend edition under the Sunday Telegraph banner. In the announcement, the paper said it will continue to report news for its website every day.

After being family-owned for a century, The Telegraph was bought in the 1980s by Independent Publications of Bryn Mawr, Pennsylvania, which owned several smaller daily and weekly newspapers around the United States as well as some other businesses. In 2005, the paper's owner bought the Cabinet Press, publisher of weekly newspapers based in nearby Milford, New Hampshire. In April 2013, it was bought by Ogden Newspapers of Wheeling, West Virginia.

== 1980 presidential primary debate ==
On February 23, 1980, the Telegraph received national attention during the New Hampshire presidential primary, when it hosted a Republican debate paid for by the campaign of former California Governor Ronald Reagan. During a discussion over which candidates should be allowed to participate, Telegraph editor Jon Breen (1935–2017), acting as moderator, ordered sound man Bob Molloy to shut off Reagan's microphone, which was met with shouts of protest from the audience; Molloy refused to comply. Mispronouncing his name, Reagan rebuked Breen saying, "I am paying for this microphone, Mr. Green!" [sic], which was cheered by the audience and applauded by most of his fellow opponents. The phrase entered the political lexicon and the publicity helped to boost Reagan's successful run for the presidency.

Reagan later recounted the incident as a "brief and seemingly small event, one lasting only a few seconds", that he said he thought, "helped take me to the White House". He continues:

When the Nashua Telegraph offered to sponsor a debate between the two of us [Reagan and George H.W. Bush] on the Saturday evening preceding the election, we both accepted. Understandably, this brought howls from the other candidates. In protest, one of them, Senator Bob Dole, complained to the Federal Election Commission that by financing a debate between only two of the seven candidates, the newspaper was making an illegal contribution to the Bush and Reagan campaigns. The commission agreed with him, so my campaign offered to pay the full cost of the debate—a few thousand dollars—and they accepted. I thought it had been unfair to exclude the other candidates from the debate.

Arriving at the debate, Reagan found two seats prepared, one each for himself and for Bush on either side of Breen. The other candidates were confused, as was the audience.

I decided I should explain to the crowd what the delay was all about and started to speak. As I did, an editor of the Nashua newspaper shouted to the sound man, "Turn Mr. Reagan's microphone off." Well, I didn't like that—we were paying the freight for the debate and he was acting as if his newspaper was still sponsoring it. I turned to him, with the microphone still on, and said the first thing that came to my mind: "I am paying for this microphone, Mr. Green!" [sic] Well, for some reason my words hit the audience, whose emotions were already worked up, like a sledgehammer. The crowd roared and just went wild. I may have won the debate, the primary—and the nomination—right there.

== See also ==
- List of newspapers in New Hampshire
