= Free newspaper =

Newspapers distributed free of charge

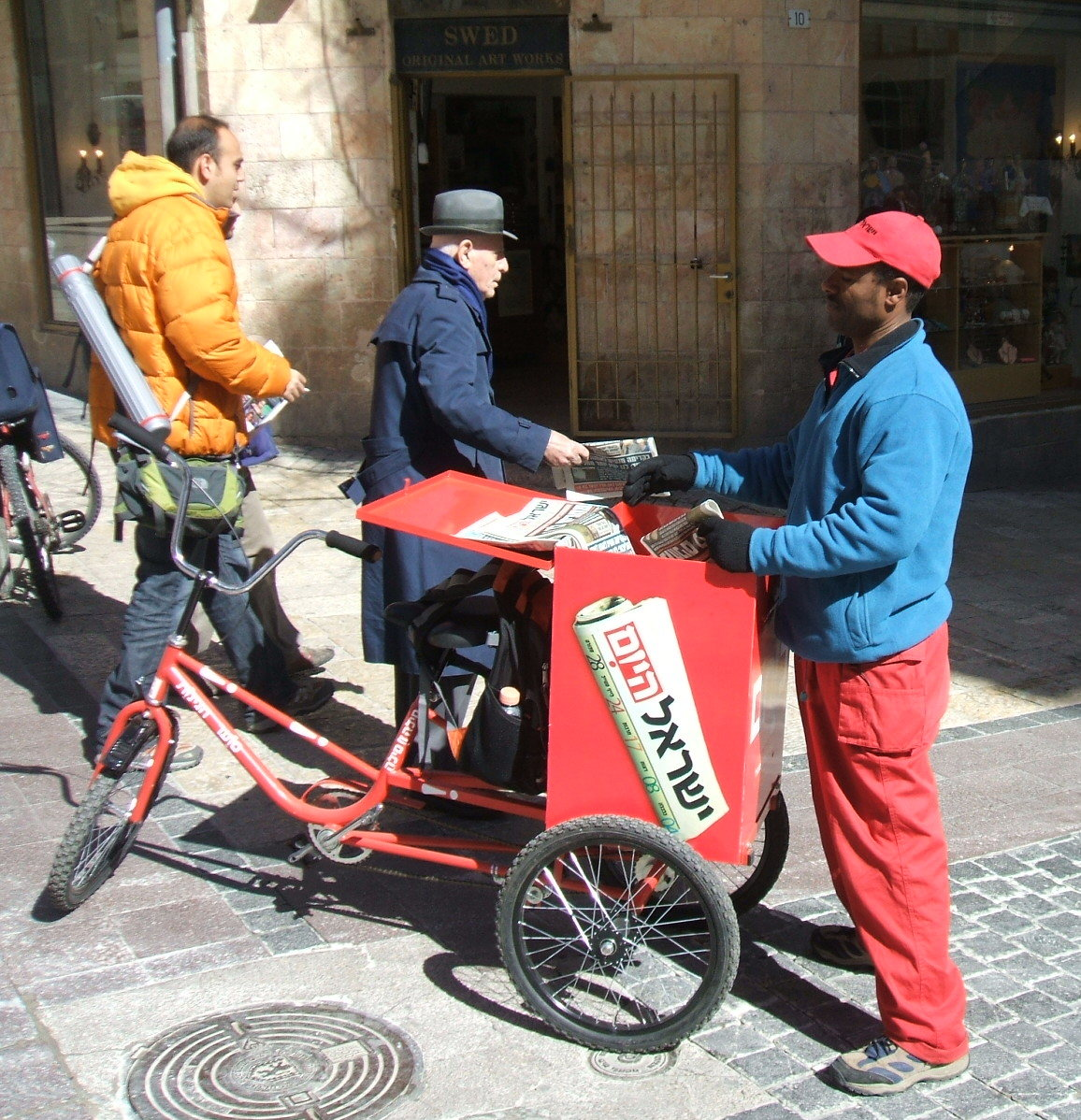
Copies of Israel Hayom being distributed in Jerusalem in 2009

Free newspapers are distributed free of charge, often in central places in cities and towns, on public transport, with other newspapers, or separately door-to-door. The revenues of such newspapers are based on advertising. They are published at different levels of frequencies, such as daily, weekly or monthly.

== Origins ==
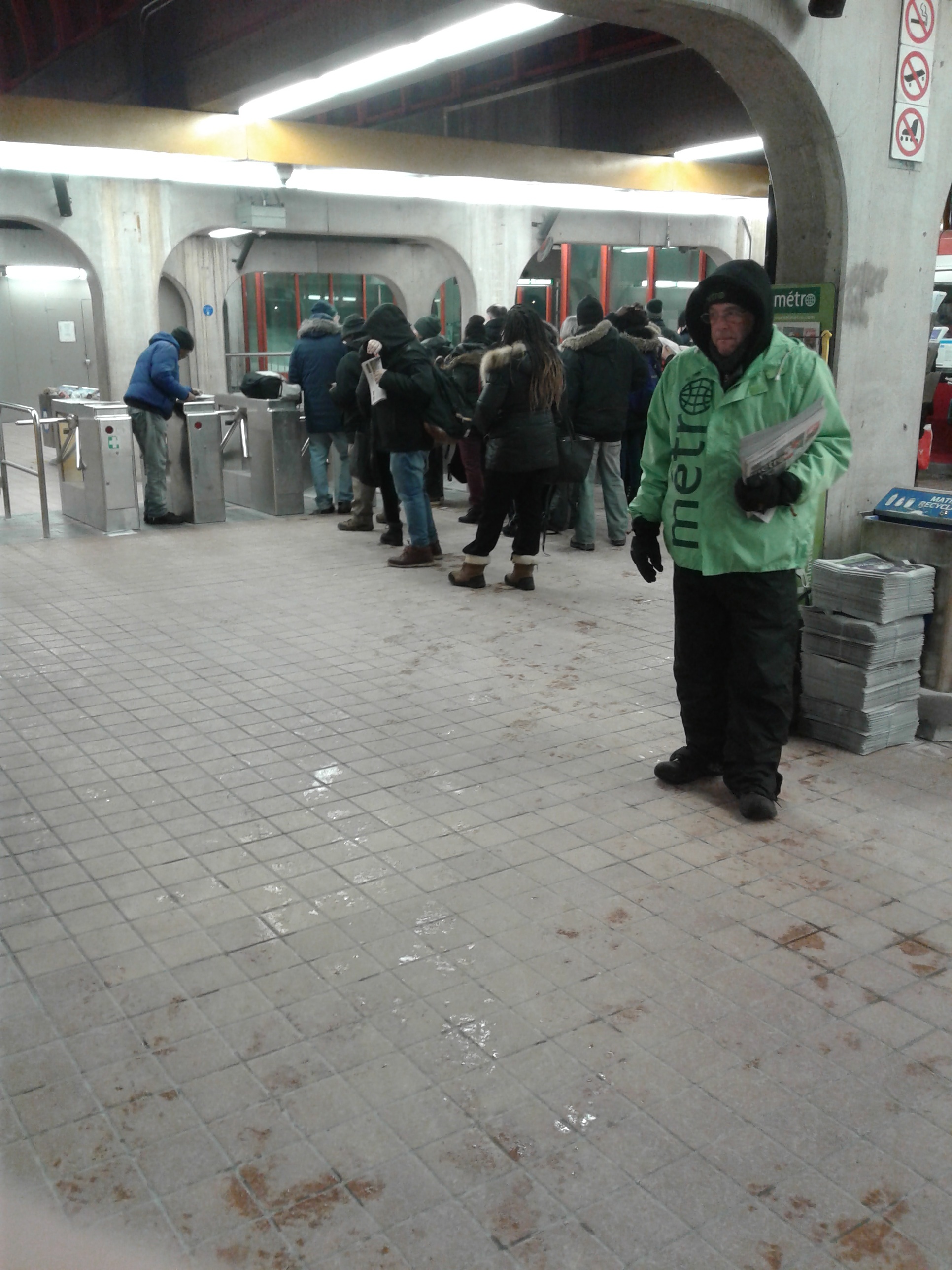
Distribution of Metro in Montreal in February 2018

=== Australia ===
In 1906, the Manly Daily in Australia was launched. It was distributed on the ferry boats to Sydney and was later published as a free community daily by Rupert Murdoch's News Ltd.

=== Germany ===
In 1885, the General-Anzeiger für Lübeck und Umgebung (Germany) was launched. The paper was founded in 1882 by Charles Coleman (1852–1936) as a free twice-a-week advertising paper in the Northern German town of Lübeck. In 1885 the paper went daily. From the beginning the General-Anzeiger für Lübeck had a mixed model, for 60 pfennig it was home delivered for three months. Unknown, however, is when the free distribution ended. The company website states that the 'sold' circulation in 1887 was 5,000; in 1890 total circulation was 12,800.

=== United Kingdom ===
In 1984, the Birmingham Daily News was launched in Birmingham, England. It was distributed free of charge on weekdays to 300,000 households in the West Midlands and was the first free daily in Europe. It was profitable until the early 1990s recession, when it was converted into a weekly title by its then owners Reed Elsevier. By 1992, a number of former paid-for local newspapers in the United Kingdom, such as the Walsall Observer, were being closed down and converted to free newspapers (sometimes called "freesheets").

In 1995, the same year the Palo Alto Daily News began, Metro started what may be the first free daily newspaper distributed through public transport in Stockholm, Sweden. Later, Metro launched free papers in many European and other countries. In the UK, the Daily Mail and General Trust group launched its own edition of Metro in London in 1999, beating Metro International to the London market. The paper now has 13 editions across the country and a combined readership of 1.7 million.

In October 2009, the Evening Standard became a free newspaper, becoming the first free quality press publication and doubling its circulation.

=== United States ===
Free newspapers in the United States trace their history back to the 1940s when Walnut Creek, California publisher Dean Lesher began what is widely believed to be the first free daily, now known as the East Bay Times. In the 1960s, he converted that newspaper and three others in the county to paid circulation.

In the early 1970s, in Boulder, Colorado, regents at the University of Colorado kicked the student-run Colorado Daily off campus because of editorials against the Vietnam War. Regents hoped the paper would die; instead it began to focus on the community as a free tabloid published five days a week.

In the following decades, a number of free dailies opened in Colorado, mostly started by University of Colorado graduates. Free dailies opened in Aspen (1979, 1988), Vail (1981), Breckenridge (1990), Glenwood Springs (1990); Grand Junction (1995); Steamboat Springs (1990); and Telluride (1991).

In 1995, the founders of free dailies in Aspen and Vail teamed up to start the Palo Alto Daily News in Palo Alto, California, a city about 20 miles south of San Francisco. The Palo Alto paper was profitable within nine months of its launch and usually carries more than 100 retail (non-classified) ads per day.

The "Palo Alto Daily News model" has been copied a number of times over the years, including by four San Francisco Bay Area publications: the San Francisco Examiner, the San Mateo Daily Journal, the Berkeley Daily Planet, which opened in 1999 and folded in 2001 and was reopened as a twice-a-week paper by new owners in 2004, and the Contra Costa Examiner, which opened and closed in 2004.

The publishers of the Palo Alto Daily News, Aspen Times Daily founding editor Dave Price, and Vail Daily founder Jim Pavelich, have since launched successful free dailies in San Mateo, California (2000), Redwood City, California (2000), Burlingame, California (2000), Los Gatos, California (2002), Denver (2002), and Berkeley, California (2006). Each goes by the "Daily News" name with the city's name in front, such as Denver Daily News.

Under the Palo Alto Daily News model, papers are delivered to public places such as coffee shops, restaurants, stores, gyms, schools, corporate campuses, and news racks. Price and Pavelich have avoided putting the content of their newspapers online because that would reduce readership of their printed newspapers, and therefore reduce the effectiveness of their print advertising. While ads can be placed on Web pages, they are not as effective for clients as print advertising. They have said that if they ever find an example of a newspaper that is making a profit on its website, they would copy that approach.

== Free dailies today ==
In less than 10 years these papers were introduced in almost every European country and in several markets in the United States, Canada, South America, Australia, and Asia. There are, as of 2008, free newspapers in at least 58 countries. Market leader Metro distributes seven million copies daily, while other companies publish 14 million copies. These 22 million copies are read by at least 45 million people daily. Worldwide, there are now over 44 million free newspaper editions being distributed on an average day, up from 24 million in 2005. Europe has the vast majority of daily free papers at 28.5 million, with the Americas at 6.8 million and Asia/Pacific/Africa regions at 8.6 million.

== Entrepreneurs ==
Since 2000, many free dailies have been introduced, including three in Hong Kong and three in Vancouver, B.C. Besides Metro, another successful publisher is Norway's Schibsted. In Switzerland, Spain and France it publishes 20 minutes, the name indicating the time people need to read it. Schibsted also had some disappointments. A German version had to be taken from the market after a bitter newspaper war with local publishers in Cologne, while an Italian edition never saw the streets because of legal matters (non-EU companies could not control Italian media firms, but this did not prevent the Italian market from becoming flooded with free newspapers). The Schibsted editions have a total circulation of 1.7 million.

In March 2006 former Palo Alto Daily News managing editor Jeramy Gordon launched the Santa Barbara Daily Sound in Santa Barbara, California. Less than two months later, Dave Price (journalist) and Jim Pavelich launched the San Francisco Daily, which in 2008 morphed into the Palo Alto Daily Post, moving offices from San Francisco to Palo Alto.

== Legal battles ==
In almost every European market where free newspapers were introduced there have been lawsuits on every possible ground, from unfair competition to littering, from the right on the name Metro to quarrels over the right to be distributed through public transport. This kind of distribution is by no means the only way free papers are distributed: racks in busy places like shopping centers, universities, restaurants (McDonald's), and hospitals, and delivery by hand on the street, outside railway stations, or door-to-door delivery are also used.

In the United States, the owners of The Philadelphia Inquirer, Philadelphia Daily News and The New York Times sued SEPTA over an exclusive deal it made with Metro to distribute its papers on the agency's commuter trains. Metro won the suit but is losing the newspaper war; the free daily has struggled to win advertisers.

== Newspaper wars ==
The Cologne newspaper war and legal battles were not the only problems free papers encountered. In Paris, hawkers who distributed free papers were attacked, and papers were destroyed and burned. The most common newspaper war however is the clash between publishers or, to be more precise, between local publishers and entrepreneurs like in Cologne. In many cities publishers turned the market that has been quiet for decades into a battlefield. Local publishers are now responsible for almost half of the total circulation of free daily newspapers. They have a monopoly in Belgium, the UK, Singapore, Melbourne, Austria, Argentina and Iceland. However, in other markets (France, Switzerland, the Netherlands, Korea, Denmark, Finland, Italy, United States) local publishers have a substantial market share. In some French and Italian markets three titles are competing; in Seoul there were six titles in October 2004. There are three free daily papers in London.

== Internet strategy ==
Price and Pavelich have an entirely different view of the Internet than other free daily publishers. While most free daily publishers post their stories and/or PDF pages online, the creators of the Palo Alto Daily News model have refused to put their content online. They argue that posting their stories online will reduce demand for their printed newspapers, which will also reduce the effectiveness of their print ads. They note that readers have dropped their subscriptions to paid newspapers because they can get the same stories online, yet those newspapers make far less money on their websites than they do on their print editions.

== Tabloidization ==
The success of the new free daily newspaper has been imitated by other publishers. In some countries free weeklies or semiweeklies have been launched (Norway, France, Russia, Portugal, Poland). In Moscow the semiweekly (in October 2004 expanded to three times a week) is also called Metro. In the Netherlands there is a local free weekly published four times a week. Also it is very likely that the rapid tabloidization in Western Europe (UK, Ireland, Sweden, Belgium, the Netherlands) has something to do with the success of the free tabloids. In Germany there are now four so-called compact cheap newspapers.

== Competition and cannibalism ==
Figures indicate that many readers of free newspapers are indeed "new" readers or read both paid and free papers. Research by Belgian, UK, and US free dailies indicate that half of their readers only read free dailies. There seems to be a negative effect on single copy sales, but the overall effect does not indicate a great deal of impact on paid dailies. Indeed, several publishers of established paid products (notably the Tribune Company in New York and Chicago, the Washington Post Company in Washington, D.C., and News Corporation in London) have launched free newspapers in their markets despite the obvious risk of "cannibalization" (stealing readers from their own paid products) to reach new readers.

== Impact on the environment ==
Whilst the proliferation of freesheet newspapers continues to escalate, the impact on the environment has become a concern to some environmentalists. Over 44 million editions are being produced every day worldwide; it takes 12 established trees to make one tonne of newsprint, which is enough to print 14,000 editions of an average-size tabloid. That means a daily usage of newsprint of a little over 3,142 tonnes. Which, in turn, means the felling of 37,714 trees. On average around 70% of paper used by the newspaper industry is claimed to be recycled. So after recycled paper usage, over 11,314 trees are being felled daily to feed the freesheet print presses in over 58 countries. Also, whilst the increased use of recycled paper is welcomed by many, the extensive bleaching (especially use of chlorine) and other chemical processes to make reclaimed paper blank again for reuse are not lessening the concerns of environmentalists.

== Voluntary schemes ==
With the continued success of the free newspaper model, newspaper publishers are coming under increasing pressure from local councils and public transport companies to contribute more to the cleanup costs. In London, South West Trains have partnered with Network Rail to provide nine recycling bins which have been installed at Waterloo station. The project will initially run as a three-month trial and will see newspaper recycling bins located on platforms one through to four and 15 through to 19. Approximately 75,000 issues of the Metro are handed out at South West Trains' stations every morning; this represents around 12 tonnes of paper. Once the trial is complete, the companies say that they will measure the success and consider extending the scheme on a permanent basis.

London Underground have partnered with London's Metro free newspaper to place bins at Watford, West Ruislip, Stanmore, Cockfosters, Hainault and High Barnet tube stations. The bins will be in place from 6 October for a period of six months and will be emptied daily by London Underground cleaning contractors, MetroNet and Tube Lines.

Westminster Council recently announced that 120 tonnes of free newspapers were collected in six months from the 70 extra recycling bins that were sponsored by Associated Newspapers and News International. This figure falls short of the councils 400 tonnes per annum target. During the six-month period the council also collected 465 tonnes of waste paper from its own 153 on-street recycling bins. The free newspapers publishers are responsible for producing approximately 100 tonnes of free newspapers every day.

== See also ==
- List of free daily newspapers

== Sources ==
- Main source: Read Free Newspaper
