= List of newspapers in Massachusetts =

Newspapers published in Massachusetts

This is a list of newspapers in Massachusetts, including print and online.

== Daily newspapers ==
Newspaper	Area	County	Frequency	Circulation	Publisher/parent company
Athol Daily News	Athol	Franklin	Daily		Newspapers of New England, Inc.
The Berkshire Eagle	Pittsfield	Berkshire	Daily	23,835	New England Newspapers Inc.
The Boston Globe	Boston	Suffolk	Daily	245,572	Boston Globe Media Partners, LLC
Boston Herald	Boston	Suffolk	Daily	95,929	Herald Media
Cape Cod Times	Barnstable	Barnstable	Daily	35,776	USA Today Co.
The Daily Item	Lynn	Essex	Daily	16,100	Essex Media Group
Daily Hampshire Gazette	Northampton	Hampshire	Daily	15,572	Newspapers of New England, Inc.
The Daily News of Newburyport	Newburyport	Essex	Daily	9,649	Community Newspaper Holdings
Daily Times Chronicle	Woburn	Middlesex	Daily	11,195	Woburn Daily Times Inc.
The Eagle-Tribune	North Andover	Essex	Daily	35,397	Community Newspaper Holdings
The Enterprise	Brockton	Plymouth	Daily	22,454	USA Today Co.
The Gardner News	Gardner	Worcester	Daily	4,904	USA Today Co.
Gloucester Daily Times	Gloucester	Essex	Daily	7,463	Community Newspaper Holdings
The Herald News	Fall River	Bristol	Daily	14,979	USA Today Co.
The MetroWest Daily News	Framingham	Middlesex	Daily	17,830	USA Today Co.
The Milford Daily News	Milford	Worcester	Daily	6,099	USA Today Co.
The Patriot Ledger	Quincy	Norfolk	Daily	38,537	USA Today Co.
The Recorder	Greenfield	Franklin	Daily	11,253	Newspapers of New England Inc.
The Republican	Springfield	Hampden	Daily	76,353	Newhouse Newspapers
The Salem News	Salem	Essex	Daily	20,295	Community Newspaper Holdings
Sentinel & Enterprise	Fitchburg	Worcester	Daily	15,031	Digital First Media
Standard-Times	New Bedford	Bristol	Daily	21,582	USA Today Co.
The Sun	Lowell	Middlesex	Daily	42,899	Digital First Media
The Sun Chronicle	Attleboro	Bristol	Daily	14,216	TriboroMassachusetts News Media Inc.
Taunton Daily Gazette	Taunton	Bristol	Daily	6,703	USA Today Co.
Telegram & Gazette	Worcester	Worcester	Daily	74,563	USA Today Co.
The Wakefield Daily Item	Wakefield	Middlesex	Daily	4,800	The Wakefield Item Co.
The Westfield News	Westfield	Hampden	Daily	4,500	Westfield News Group

== Non-daily newspapers ==
Newspaper	Area	County	Frequency	Ownership	Notes
The Advocate	Fairhaven	Bristol	Weekly	News Corporation	Also covers Acushnet
Agawam Advertiser News	Agawam	Hampden	Weekly	Turley Publications	
Amherst Bulletin	Amherst	Hampshire	Weekly	Newspapers of New England	Also covers Deerfield, Hadley, Leverett, Pelham, Shutesbury and Sunderland
Andover Townsman	Andover	Essex	Weekly	Community Newspaper Holdings	
Ashland Local Town Pages	Ashland	Middlesex	Monthly	Local Town Pages	
Auburn News	Auburn	Worcester	Weekly	Stonebridge Press	
The Barnstable Patriot	Barnstable	Barnstable	Weekly	News Corporation	
Barre Gazette	Barre	Worcester	Weekly	Turley Publications	Also covers Hubbardston, Oakham, Petersham, Rutland
Bay State Banner	Boston	Suffolk	Weekly	Banner Publications Inc.	
Bay Windows	Boston	Suffolk	Weekly	Jeff Coakley, Sue O'Connell	Distributed throughout New England
Beacon Hill Times	Boston	Suffolk	Weekly	Independent Newspaper Group	Covers Beacon Hill, Boston
Belmont Citizen-Herald	Belmont	Middlesex	Weekly	New Media Investment Group	
Belmont Voice	Belmont	MIddlesex	Weekly	Belmont News Foundation	
Blackstone Valley Tribune	Northbridge	Worcester	Weekly	Stonebridge Press	Also covers Douglas and Uxbridge
DigBoston	Boston	Suffolk	Weekly	Dig Media Group	
The Bourne Enterprise	Bourne	Barnstable	Weekly	Falmouth Publishing Inc.	
Brookline TAB	Brookline	Norfolk	Weekly	New Media Investment Group	
Brookline.News	Brookline	Norfolk	Weekly	Independent Newspaper Group	
Cambridge Chronicle	Cambridge	Middlesex	Weekly	New Media Investment Group	
Cape Cod Chronicle	Chatham	Barnstable	Weekly	Hyora Publications	Covers Chatham and Harwich
The Cape Codder	Orleans	Barnstable	Weekly	New Media Investment Group	Also covers Brewster, Chatham, and Eastham
Carlisle Mosquito	Carlisle	Middlesex	Weekly	Carlisle Communications Inc.	
Charlestown Patriot-Bridge	Boston	Suffolk	Weekly	Independent Newspaper Group	Covers Charlestown
Charlton Villager	Charlton	Worcester	Weekly	Stonebridge Press	
Chelsea Record	Chelsea	Suffolk	Weekly	Independent Newspaper Group	
Chicopee Register	Chicopee	Hampden	Weekly	Turley Publications	
The Christian Science Monitor	Boston	Suffolk	Weekly	Christian Science Publishing Society	Daily website; formerly a printed daily
The Chronicle	Dartmouth	Bristol	Weekly	News Corporation	Also covers Westport
The Concord Bridge	Concord	Middlesex	Weekly	The Concord Independent Foundation	Began publishing in October 2022
Country Journal	Huntington	Hampshire	Weekly	Turley Publications	Also covers Becket, Blandford, Chester, Chesterfield, Cummington, Goshen, Middlefield, Montgomery, Otis, Plainfield, Russell, Sandisfield, Williamsburg, Westfield, Westhampton, and Worthington
The Dedham Times	Dedham	Norfolk	Weekly	Dedham Times, Inc.	
Dedham Transcript	Dedham	Norfolk	Weekly	New Media Investment Group	Former daily
Dorchester Reporter	Dorchester	Suffolk	Weekly	Boston Neighborhood News Inc.	
Duxbury Clipper	Duxbury	Plymouth	Weekly	Clipper Press	
East Boston Times-Free Press	Boston	Suffolk	Weekly	Independent Newspaper Group	Covers East Boston
Everett Independent	Everett	Middlesex	Weekly	Independent Newspaper Group	
The Falmouth Enterprise	Falmouth	Barnstable	Weekly	Falmouth Publishing Inc.	
Fall River Spirit	Fall River	Bristol	Weekly	News Corporation	
The Foxboro Reporter	Foxborough	Norfolk	Weekly	Foxboro Reporter	
H-W News	Hamilton, Wenham	Essex	Weekly	H-W News, Inc.	
The Harvard Press	Harvard	Worcester	Weekly		
The Haverhill Gazette	Haverhill	Essex	Weekly	Community Newspaper Holdings	
The Herald	Chicopee	Hampden	Weekly	Reminder Publications	Also covers Granby, Holyoke, and South Hadley
Holyoke Sun	Holyoke	Hampden	Weekly	Turley Publications	
Hopkinton Independent	Hopkinton	Middlesex	BiWeekly	Hopkinton Independent, LLC	Full saturation paper
Hudson Sun	Hudson	Middlesex	Weekly	New Media Investment Group	
Hyde Park Bulletin	Boston	Suffolk	Weekly	Bulletin Newspapers, Inc.	Covers Hyde Park and Boston
The Independent of Stow & Bolton	Stow, Bolton	Middlesex, Worcester	Weekly		
The Inquirer and Mirror	Nantucket	Nantucket	Weekly	News Corporation	
Ipswich Local News	Ipswich, Rowley, Topsfield, Boxford	Essex	Weekly	Independent non-profit	
The Item	Clinton	Worcester	Weekly	The New York Times Company	Former daily; also covers Berlin, Bolton, Lancaster, and Sterling
Jamaica Plain Gazette	Boston	Suffolk	Biweekly	Independent Newspaper Group	
Journal Register	Palmer	Hampden	Weekly	Turley Publications	Also covers Monson
The Landmark	Holden	Worcester	Weekly	Holden Landmark Corp.	Also covers Paxton, Princeton, Rutland, and Sterling
Leominster Champion	Leominster	Worcester	Weekly	Holden Landmark Corp.	
Longmeadow News	Longmeadow	Hampden	Weekly	Westfield News Group	
Ludlow Register	Ludlow	Hampden	Weekly	Turley Publications	
The Lunenburg Ledger	Lunenburg	Worcester	Weekly	DG Ink	
Lynn Journal	Lynn	Essex	Weekly	Independent Newspaper Group	
Main Street Journal	Marlborough	Middlesex	Weekly	Main Street Journal Inc.	
The Manchester Cricket	Manchester-by-the-Sea	Essex			
Marlborough Enterprise	Marlborough	Middlesex	Weekly	New Media Investment Group	
The Martha's Vineyard Times	Tisbury	Dukes	Weekly	Martha's Vineyard Times Corp.	Covers all of Martha's Vineyard
The Mashpee Enterprise	Mashpee	Barnstable	Weekly	Falmouth Publishing Inc.	
The Medfield Press	Medfield	Norfolk	Weekly	New Media Investment Group	
Melrose Weekly News	Melrose	Middlesex	Weekly	The Wakefield Item Co.	
Middleboro Gazette	Middleborough	Plymouth	Weekly	News Corporation	Also covers Lakeville
The Millbury-Sutton Chronicle	Millbury	Worcester	Weekly	Holden Landmark Corp.	Also covers Sutton
Milton Times	Milton	Norfolk	Weekly	Pat Desmond	
Mission Hill Gazette	Boston	Suffolk	Monthly	Independent Newspaper Group	Covers Mission Hill, Boston
Montague Reporter	Montague	Franklin	Weekly		Also covers Wendell, Gill and Erving
North End Regional Review	Boston	Suffolk	Weekly	Independent Newspaper Group	Covers North End and Boston
Norwood Record	Norwood	Norfolk	Weekly	Bulletin Newspapers, Inc.	
The Peabody and Lynnfield Weekly News	Peabody	Essex	Weekly		Also covers Lynnfield
Provincetown Independent	Provincetown	Barnstable	Weekly	Family and community owned	Covers Provincetown, Truro, Wellfleet, and Eastham
Quaboag Current	Brookfield	Worcester	Weekly	Turley Publications	Also covers East Brookfield, New Braintree, North Brookfield, Warren, and West Brookfield
Quincy Sun	Quincy	Norfolk	Weekly		
Revere Journal	Revere	Suffolk	Weekly	Independent Newspaper Group	
Richmond Record	Richmond	Berkshire	Monthly	The Richmond Record Inc	
Rumbo (newspaper)	Lawrence	Essex	Weekly	SUDA Inc.	Also covers Methuen; biweekly regional edition covers more of the Merrimack Valley
Salem Gazette	Salem	Essex	Weekly	New Media Investment Group	
The Sandwich Enterprise	Sandwich	Barnstable	Weekly	Falmouth Publishing Inc.	
Saugus Advertiser	Saugus	Essex	Weekly	New Media Investment Group	
Seekonk Star	Seekonk	Bristol	Weekly	East Bay Newspapers	
Sentinel	Belchertown	Hampshire	Weekly	Turley Publications	Also covers Amherst and Granby
Shrewsbury Chronicle	Shrewsbury	Worcester	Weekly	New Media Investment Group	
The Somerville Times	Somerville	Middlesex	Weekly	Prospect Hill Publishing Corp.	
South End News	Boston	Suffolk	Weekly	South End News Inc.	Covers South End and Boston
Southbridge News	Southbridge	Worcester	Daily		Stonebridge Press
The Spectator	Somerset	Bristol	Weekly	News Corporation	Also covers Dighton, Rehoboth, and Swansea
Spencer New Leader	Spencer	Worcester	Weekly	Stonebridge Press	Also covers Brookfield, East Brookfield, Leicester, North Brookfield, and West Brookfield
The Stoneham Independent	Stoneham	Middlesex	Weekly	Woburn Daily Times Inc.	
Sturbridge Villager	Sturbridge	Worcester	Weekly	Stonebridge Press	Also covers Brimfield, Holland, and Wales
The Summit	Easthampton	Hampshire	Weekly	Newspapers of New England	Also covers Southampton and Westhampton
Tantasqua Town Common	Sturbridge	Worcester	Weekly	Turley Publications	Also covers Brimfield, Holland, nd Wales
The Town Common	Amesbury Boxford Danvers Essex Georgetown Groveland Hampton Haverhill Ipswich Merrimac Newbury Newburyport Portsmouth Rowley Rye Salisbury Seabrook Topsfield West Newbury	Essex	Weekly	The Town Common, Inc.	Covers the Upper North Shore of MA and Coastal NH
Town Reminder	South Hadley	Hampshire	Weekly	Turley Publications	
The Transcript & Journal	Medford	Middlesex	Weekly	New Media Investment Group	Also covers Somerville
Vineyard Gazette	Edgartown	Dukes	Weekly	The Martha's Vineyard Gazette LLC	Covers all of Martha's Vineyard
The Wanderer (Massachusetts_newspaper)	Mattapoisett	Plymouth	Weekly		Also covers Marion and Rochester
Ware River News	Ware	Hampshire	Weekly	Turley Publications	Also covers Hardwick
Wayland Town Crier	Wayland	Middlesex	Weekly	New Media Investment Group	
The Webster Times	Webster	Worcester	Weekly	Stonebridge Press	Also covers Dudley and Oxford
The Wellesley Townsman	Wellesley	Norfolk	Weekly	New Media Investment Group	
Westport Shorelines	Westport	Bristol	Weekly	East Bay Newspapers	
West Roxbury-Roslindale Bulletin	Boston	Suffolk	Non-daily	Bulletin Newspapers, Inc.	Covers Roslindale and West Roxbury
The Westwood Press	Westwood	Norfolk	Weekly	New Media Investment Group	
Wilbraham-Hampden Times	Wilbraham	Hampden	Weekly	Turley Publications	Also covers Hampden
Winchendon Courier	Winchendon	Worcester	Weekly	Stonebridge Press	
Winthrop Sun Transcript	Winthrop	Suffolk	Weekly	Independent Newspaper Group	
Whitman-Hanson Express	Hanson	Plymouth	Weekly	Clipper Press	Also covers Whitman
Worcester Magazine	Worcester	Worcester	Weekly	Holden Landmark Corp.	Alternative weekly

== College newspapers ==
- The Amherst Student – Amherst College
- The Beacon – Massachusetts College of Liberal Arts
- The Beacon – Merrimack College
- The Berkeley Beacon – Emerson College
- The Comment – Bridgewater State University
- The Connector – UMass Lowell
- The Daily Collegian – UMass Amherst
- The Daily Free Press – Boston University
- The Harvard Crimson – Harvard University
- The Heights – Boston College
- The Hub – Emmanuel College
- The Independent – Harvard University
- The Justice – Brandeis University
- The Massachusetts Daily Collegian – University of Massachusetts Amherst
- The Mass Media – University of Massachusetts Boston
- The Mount Holyoke News – Mount Holyoke College
- The Huntington News – Northeastern University
- The Observer – Bristol Community College
- The Pennon – North Shore Community College
- The Sophian – Smith College
- The Suffolk Journal – Suffolk University
- The Tech – Massachusetts Institute of Technology
- The Torch – UMass Dartmouth
- The Towers – Worcester Polytechnic Institute
- The Tufts Daily – Tufts University
- The Vanguard – Bentley College
- The Wheaton Wire – Wheaton College
- The Williams Record – Williams College
- Le Provocateur – Assumption College

== Special-interest newspapers ==
- The Anchor – Fall River
- Banker & Tradesman – Boston
- Bay Windows – Boston
- Boston Business Journal – Boston
- The Catholic Free Press – Worcester
- Fifty Plus Advocate – Worcester
- Massachusetts Lawyers Weekly – Boston
- The Pilot – Braintree
- Sampan – Boston
- The Rainbow Times – Boston

== Monthly Newspapers ==
- The Boston Broadside.
- The Boston Irish Reporter.

== Foreign-language newspapers ==
Newspaper	Language	Place of publication	Notes
Armenian Mirror-Spectator	English	Watertown	
Baikar	Armenian	Watertown	
Dielli	Albanian, English	Boston	
Hairenik	Armenian	Watertown	
Hellenic Chronicle	English	Boston	
El Heraldo	Spanish	Boston	Ceased in 2000?
El Mundo	Spanish	Boston	
El Planeta	Spanish	Boston	
Portuguese Times	Portuguese	New Bedford	
Predvestnik	Russian	Westfield	Ceased in 2008?
Raivaaja	Finnish, English	Fitchburg	Finnish American newspaper established in 1905. Ceased in 2009.
Sampan	Chinese, English	Boston	
World Journal (Boston edition)	Chinese, English	Boston?	Ceased publication

== See also ==
- Media in Boston, Massachusetts
- List of radio stations in Massachusetts
- List of television stations in Massachusetts
- List of assets owned by Gannett Co., Inc.: Massachusetts

Comprehensive

- Lists of newspapers
- List of newspapers in the United States

Frequency

- List of free daily newspapers in the United States
- List of weekly newspapers in the United States

Circulation

- List of international newspapers originating in the United States
- List of national newspapers in the United States
- List of newspapers in the United States by circulation

Foreign language

- List of French-language newspapers published in the United States
- List of German-language newspapers published in the United States
- List of Spanish-language newspapers published in the United States

Specialty

- List of African-American newspapers in the United States
- List of alternative weekly newspapers in the United States
- List of business newspapers in the United States
- List of family-owned newspapers in the United States
- List of Jewish newspapers in the United States
- List of LGBTQ periodicals in the United States
- List of student newspapers in the United States
- List of supermarket tabloids in the United States
- List of underground press in the United States

Other

- List of defunct newspapers of the United States
