= List of Community Newspaper Company weeklies =

Community Newspaper Company published more than 100 weekly newspapers in central and eastern Massachusetts, divided into five geographic units.

== Metro Unit ==
The Metro papers cover neighborhoods of Boston and close-in suburbs.

- Allston-Brighton Tab of Allston and Brighton (Boston) -- paid, Friday.
- Brookline Tab of Brookline -- free, Thursday.
- Cambridge Chronicle of Cambridge -- paid, Thursday.
- Cambridge Tab of Cambridge -- free, Friday.
- Dover-Sherborn Press of Dover and Sherborn -- paid, Thursday.
- Roslindale Transcript of Roslindale (Boston) -- paid, Thursday.
- Somerville Journal of Somerville -- paid, Thursday.
- Needham Times of Needham -- free, Thursday.
- Newton Tab of Newton -- free, Wednesday.
- Watertown Tab & Press of Watertown -- paid, Thursday.
- Wellesley Townsman of Wellesley -- paid, Thursday.
- West Roxbury Transcript of West Roxbury (Boston) -- paid, Thursday.

== North Unit ==
The following titles, many of them formerly part of the North Shore Weeklies chain, are published out of the North Unit's offices in Beverly:

- Amesbury News of Amesbury -- paid, Friday.
- Beverly Citizen of Beverly -- paid, Thursday.
- Danvers Herald of Danvers -- paid, Thursday.
- Cape Ann Beacon of Gloucester, Rockport, Manchester-by-the-Sea and Essex -- free, Friday
- Georgetown Record of Georgetown -- paid, Thursday.
- H-W News of Hamilton and Wenham -- free, Friday.
- Ipswich Chronicle of Ipswich -- paid, Thursday.
- Malden Observer of Malden -- paid, Friday.
- Marblehead Reporter of Marblehead -- paid, Thursday.
- Medford Transcript of Medford -- paid, Thursday.
- Melrose Free Press of Melrose -- paid, Thursday.
- Newburyport Current of Newburyport and surrounding towns -- free, Friday.
- North Andover Citizen of North Andover -- paid, Friday.
- North Shore Sunday of Lynn, Peabody and surrounding towns -- free, Friday.
- Salem Gazette of Salem -- free, Friday.
- Saugus Advertiser of Saugus -- paid, Thursday.
- Stoneham Sun of Stoneham -- free, Wednesday.
- Swampscott Reporter of Swampscott -- paid, Thursday.
- Tri-Town Transcript of Boxford, Middleton and Topsfield -- paid, Friday.
- Wakefield Observer of Wakefield -- paid, Thursday.

== Northwest Unit ==
With two main offices in Concord and Lexington, Northwest's core are the Beacon and Minuteman papers from Beacon Communications Corporation, along with some former papers of Century Newspapers and Bay State Newspaper Company. Its newest acquisitions are based in satellite bureaus at CNC's westernmost reach, in Harvard and Clinton.

- Arlington Advocate of Arlington -- paid, Thursday.
- The Beacon of Acton and Boxborough -- paid, Thursday. http://www.wickedlocal.com/acton
- The Beacon-Villager of Maynard and Stow -- paid, Thursday.
- Bedford Minuteman of Bedford -- paid, Thursday.
- Belmont Citizen-Herald of Belmont -- paid, Thursday.
- Billerica Minuteman of Billerica -- paid, Thursday.
- The Bolton Common of Bolton -- paid, Friday.
- Burlington Union of Burlington -- paid, Thursday.
- Chelmsford Independent of Chelmsford -- paid, Thursday.
- Concord Journal of Concord -- paid, Thursday.
- The Harvard Post of Harvard -- paid, Friday.
- Lexington Minuteman of Lexington -- paid, Thursday.
- Lincoln Journal of Lincoln -- paid, Thursday.
- Littleton Independent of Littleton -- paid, Thursday.
- Tewksbury Advocate of Tewksbury -- paid, Thursday.
- Times & Courier of Clinton and Lancaster -- paid, Thursday.
- The Reading Advocate of Reading -- paid, Thursday.
- Westford Eagle of Westford -- paid, Thursday.
- Wilmington Advocate of Wilmington -- free, Thursday.
- Winchester Star of Winchester -- paid, Thursday. http://www.wickedlocal.com/winchester
- Woburn Advocate of Woburn -- free, Thursday.

== South Unit ==
The South Unit includes the "Cape Cod Unit" (which despite the name is supervised by the same editor-in-chief as South) and newspapers acquired from Memorial Press Group and Call Group in 2006. The unit initially comprised papers from Cape Cod Publishing Company and Mariner Group.

- Abington Mariner of Abington -- paid, Friday.
- Braintree Forum of Braintree -- paid, Wednesday.
- Bridgewater Independent of Bridgewater -- free, Wednesday.
- Carver Reporter of Carver -- paid, Wednesday.
- Cohasset Mariner of Cohasset -- paid, Friday.
- Duxbury Reporter of Duxbury -- free, Friday.
- East Bridgewater Star of East Bridgewater -- free, Wednesday.
- Halifax-Plympton Reporter of Halifax and Plympton -- paid, Friday.
- Hanover Mariner of Hanover -- paid, Wednesday.
- Hanson Town Crier of Hanson -- free, Wednesday.
- Hingham Journal of Hingham -- paid, Thursday.
- Holbrook Sun of Holbrook -- paid, Friday.
- Kingston Reporter of Kingston -- paid, Friday.
- Lakeville Call of Lakeville -- free, Wednesday.
- Marshfield Mariner of Marshfield -- paid, Wednesday.
- Norwell Mariner of Norwell -- paid, Thursday.
- Old Colony Memorial of Plymouth -- paid, Wednesday and Saturday.
- Pembroke Mariner-Reporter of Pembroke -- paid, Friday.
- Randolph Herald of Randolph -- free, Wednesday.
- Raynham Call of Raynham -- free, Wednesday.
- Rockland Standard of Rockland -- paid, Friday.
- Scituate Mariner of Scituate -- paid, Thursday.
- The Sentinel of Marion, Mattapoisett and Rochester -- paid, Wednesday.
- Taunton Call of Taunton -- free, Wednesday.
- Wareham Courier of Wareham -- paid, Thursday.
- West Bridgewater Times of West Bridgewater -- free, Wednesday.
- Weymouth News of Weymouth -- paid, Wednesday.
- Whitman Times of Whitman -- free, Wednesday.

=== Cape Cod ===
- Bourne Courier of Bourne -- Wednesday.
- Falmouth Bulletin of Falmouth -- Thursday.
- Harwich Oracle of Harwich -- paid, Wednesday.
- The Register of Barnstable -- paid, Thursday.
- Sandwich Broadsider of Mashpee and Sandwich
- Upper Cape Codder -- paid, Thursday.

== West Unit ==
Newspapers in the West Unit include all four CNC dailies and a few Framingham-area weeklies published "as editions of The MetroWest Daily News." The non-Daily News West weeklies include titles in Boston's western suburbs -- MetroWest -- as well as several in Norfolk County, southwest and south of the city, and a few farther south in Bristol County.

- Ashland Tab of Ashland -- paid, Thursday.
- Canton Journal of Canton -- paid, Friday.
- Country Gazette of Franklin and surrounding towns -- free, Friday.
- Easton Journal of Easton -- paid, Friday.
- Framingham Tab of Framingham -- free, Friday.
- Holliston Tab of Holliston -- paid, Thursday.
- Hopkinton Crier of Hopkinton -- paid, Friday.
- Hudson Sun of Hudson -- paid, Thursday.
- Mansfield News of Mansfield -- paid, Friday.
- Marlborough Enterprise of Marlborough -- paid, Thursday.
- Medfield PressMedfield Press of Medfield -- paid, Thursday.
- Norton Mirror of Norton -- paid, Friday.
- Norwood Bulletin of Norwood -- paid, Thursday.
- Sharon Advocate of Sharon -- paid, Friday.
- Shrewsbury Chronicle of Shrewsbury -- paid, Thursday.
- Southboro Villager of Northborough and Southborough -- paid, Friday.
- Stoughton Journal of Stoughton -- paid, Friday.
- Westborough News of Westborough -- paid, Friday.
- Weston Town Crier and Weston Tab of Weston -- paid, Thursday.
- Westwood PressWestwood Press of Westwood -- paid, Thursday.

=== Daily News editions ===
- The Daily News Transcript of Dedham and surrounding towns -- paid, five-day daily.
- The Daily News Tribune of Newton and Waltham -- paid, five-day daily.
- The MetroWest Daily News of Framingham and surrounding towns -- paid, seven-day daily.
- The Milford Daily News of Milford and surrounding towns -- paid, seven-day daily.
- Natick Bulletin and Natick Tab of Natick -- paid, Friday and Sunday.
- Sudbury Town Crier and Sudbury Tab of Sudbury -- paid, Thursday and Sunday.
- Wayland Town Crier and Wayland Tab of Wayland -- paid, Thursday and Sunday.

== See also ==
- List of newspapers owned by GateHouse Media
