= Beacon Communications Corporation =

Former publisher

Beacon Communications Corp.
- Industry: Newspapers
- Founded: 1945
- Defunct: January 11, 1996
- Fate: Bought, then dissolved
- Successor: Community Newspaper Company
- Headquarters: 20 Main Street, Acton, Massachusetts 01720 United States
- Products: Enterprise-Sun dailies and 11 weekly newspapers in Boston suburbs
- Number of employees: 1993: 190
- Parent: Independent, 1945-1984; Worcester Telegram, 1984-1986; Chronicle Publishing Co., 1986-1993; Fidelity Investments, 1993-1996

Beacon Communications Corp. was a newspaper publisher in Acton, Massachusetts, United States, operating a dozen weekly newspapers as well as daily newspapers in Hudson and Marlborough, Massachusetts. It was bought by Fidelity Investments in 1993 and incorporated into Community Newspaper Company, Massachusetts' largest weekly newspaper publisher, now owned by GateHouse Media.

== History ==
Beacon's history begins in the 1940s with the first issues of The Beacon newspaper, later for a time called the Assabet Valley Beacon. The newspaper eventually grew to cover the towns of Acton, Boxborough, Maynard and Stow, just west of Concord, Massachusetts.

Over time, The Beacon's publishers acquired other weeklies in neighboring towns, including titles as far east as Lexington and Burlington. The company's last independent owners were Joseph V. Stuart and Robert E. Anderson, who sold the papers in 1984 to the owners of the Worcester Telegram daily newspaper in Worcester.

=== Chronicle ===
Under Telegram ownership, Beacon took on responsibility for the Hudson Daily Sun and Marlboro Enterprise, two small daily newspapers at the southern end of Beacon's coverage area. The dailies had been sold to the Telegram in 1969.

The sale also tied Beacon to independent mid-sized dailies, the Telegram and Evening Gazette, in an industry rapidly consolidating. With the death of Telegram owner Robert W. Stoddard in December 1984, the company was sold 21 months later to Chronicle Publishing Company of San Francisco, California.

Chronicle's investment in Massachusetts continued in 1989 with the purchase of the Southborough Villager, a 1,500-circulation weekly that was added to Beacon's roster. Peter E. Thieriot, Chronicle's local publisher, said "I have expressed my hope and desire that Beacon grow both internally and through acquisition. This is the acquisition."

In the Chronicle years, however, Beacon's corporate ownership usually had its hands full with its Worcester property—turning two commonly owned but competing newsrooms into one staff, and finally shuttering an evening newspaper to concentrate on a combined morning edition. With its focus solely on Worcester County, said a Chronicle executive, it "was logical" to sell Beacon.

=== Fidelity ===
The buyer was Fidelity Investments' Community Newspaper Company, which in 1993 was already the dominant weekly newspaper publisher in north and west suburban Boston. Beacon Communications filled a hole in CNC's coverage arc from MetroWest (Tab Communications) to Essex County (Bay State Newspaper Company and North Shore Weeklies).

With the purchase, CNC's weekly circulation rose to 630,000, a number higher than the daily circulation of The Boston Globe, and CNC passed another milestone: the Sun and Enterprise, which CNC combined into one Enterprise-Sun, became the company's first daily newspaper.

Beacon Communications, like most CNC acquisitions, was initially run as a semi-autonomous subsidiary. When News-Transcript Group was bought in 1995, Beacon's Enterprise-Sun initially seemed set to continue competing—not very successfully—with the Middlesex News, which had a bureau in Marlborough. Instead, CNC folded its first daily, converting it into two weeklies and a West Edition for the News.

The separate companies were dissolved in early 1996, when CNC realigned its operating units by geography. Beacon's original papers formed the core of the new Northwest Unit, while the Hudson, Marlborough and Southborough weeklies joined the West Unit.

== Properties ==
Upon its sale to CNC in 1993, Beacon Communications consisted of 11 weekly newspapers and two daily titles (produced by the same newsroom), all in Middlesex County, Massachusetts:

- Hudson Daily Sun of Hudson
- Marlboro Enterprise daily of Marlborough
- The Beacon of Acton and Boxborough
- The Beacon of Maynard and Stow
- Bedford Minute-Man of Bedford
- Burlington Times-Union of Burlington
- Chelmsford Independent of Chelmsford
- The Concord Journal of Concord
- Lexington Minute-Man of Lexington
- Lincoln Journal of Lincoln
- Minute-Man Chronicle of Acton
- Southborough Villager of Southborough
- Westford Eagle of Westford

The Minute-Man Chronicle, a twice-weekly regional supplement, was first renamed Weekend Extra and then discontinued; all the other Beacon papers still publish today. The dailies have been converted to weeklies (Hudson Sun and Marlborough Enterprise), the spelling of "Minuteman" has changed, the Burlington paper dropped the name "Times" and the Maynard-Stow paper is now called The Beacon-Villager to distinguish it from the Acton-Boxborough paper.
