= Mariner Group =

- Industry: Newspapers
- Founded: 1972
- Defunct: January 11, 1996
- Fate: Bought, then dissolved
- Successor: Community Newspaper Company
- Headquarters: 165 Enterprise Drive, Marshfield, Massachusetts 02050; United States
- Key people: David S. Cutler, founder
- Products: Several Mariner weekly newspapers along the Massachusetts South Shore
- Parent: Independent, 1972-1989; Capital Cities/ABC, 1989-1995; Fidelity Investments, 1995-1996

Mariner Group, based in Marshfield, Massachusetts, United States, was a chain of weekly newspapers in the suburban South Shore near Boston, Massachusetts, United States. Founded in 1972 with one paper, the Marshfield Mariner, the group was sold in 1989 to Capital Cities/ABC and again in 1995 to Fidelity Investments, which dissolved it into Community Newspaper Company a few months later.

Today, several of the Mariner papers still publish as part of CNC, now owned by GateHouse Media. Many of the others were folded into former competitors after CNC acquired Mariner's chief competitor, Memorial Press Group.

== History ==
David S. Cutler, a former reporter for The Patriot Ledger and son of the publisher of the weekly Duxbury Clipper, started the Marshfield Mariner weekly in 1972 and expanded his holdings to include 17 weekly newspapers—including several startup Mariners—by 1989.

He sold the company that year to Capital Cities for an estimated US$7 or US$8 million. Fidelity Investments bid for the papers at that time but was unsuccessful.

In 1993, the company bought the competing Hingham Journal, founded in 1827, and folded it into the Hingham Mariner.

In 1994, Capital Cities announced it would sell all 74 of its newspapers in New England, including the Mariner chain.

Fidelity, always considered a strong contender to buy Mariner, bought another large suburban chain of weeklies, News-Transcript Group, in late 1994, fueling speculation that a deal for Mariner was close behind. At the same time, The Boston Globe was said to be interested in buying the South Shore weeklies.

The deal was not struck until early 1995, however. Fidelity's subsidiary, Community Newspaper Company, purchased Mariner for an undisclosed sum. At the time, CNC chairman William Elfers said Mariner "sort of fills out the map," giving CNC an uninterrupted belt of papers surrounding Boston, from Cape Cod through MetroWest to the Massachusetts North Shore. The Mariner purchase raised CNC's weekly circulation to 1,018,000.

Mariner Group was dissolved in early 1996, when CNC realigned its operating units by geography. The Mariners became the core of the new South Unit.

== Properties ==
At the time of its sale to CNC in 1995, Mariner Group consisted of the following weeklies:

- Abington-Rockland Mariner of Abington and Rockland (now called The Mariner and covering only Abington)
- Braintree Forum of Braintree
- Canton Journal of Canton
- Cohasset Mariner of Cohasset
- Easton Journal of Easton
- Hanover Mariner of Hanover
- Hingham Mariner of Hingham (later renamed The Hingham Journal)
- Holbrook Sun of Holbrook
- Kingston Mariner of Kingston (later folded into the Kingston Reporter)
- Marshfield Mariner of Marshfield (the original Mariner)
- Norwell Mariner of Norwell
- Pembroke Mariner of Pembroke (later combined into the Pembroke Mariner & Reporter)
- Randolph Mariner of Randolph (later folded into the Randolph Herald)
- Scituate Mariner of Scituate
- Stoughton Journal of Stoughton
- Weymouth News of Weymouth

After the dissolution of Mariner Group, CNC started a Duxbury Mariner in Duxbury, but closed that paper in 1999 after losing a newspaper war with the Duxbury Reporter, part of Memorial Press Group, and the longtime leader, the Duxbury Clipper, of which David Cutler had become publisher.

For a few months following GateHouse Media's purchase of CNC and Memorial Press Group in 2006, the new sister companies continued to publish competing titles in several South Shore towns. Eventually the duplications were eliminated, leading to the closure of the Kingston and Randolph Mariners, and the Abington-Rockland Mariner ceasing Rockland coverage.
