= The Taunton Call =

American weekly newspaper (2003–2008)

- Type: Weekly newspaper
- Format: Broadsheet
- Owner(s): Call Group Inc. (2003-2005); Memorial Press Group (2005-2006); Community Newspaper Company (2006); GateHouse Media (2006-2008)
- Editor: Rebecca Hyman
- Founded: 2003
- Ceased publication: 2008

The Taunton Call was a free newspaper that was delivered weekly to the residents of the city of Taunton, Massachusetts, by Gatehouse Media. The newspaper covered local news and other materials in and for the residents of the city.

In July 2008 Gatehouse Media, owner of The Taunton Call announced it was ending publication of the paper. The last edition of The Taunton Call was July 16, 2008.

== History ==
The Taunton Call was founded in 2003 by three female journalists, Eva Gaffney, Donna Nuttall, and Lyn Pelletier, along with two other free weeklies (The Raynham Call and The Lakeville Call) as part of the larger Call Group, Inc. In 2005, the three weeklies were sold to Memorial Press Group, which was in turn acquired by Community Newspaper Company (CNC) in 2006 (which itself was bought by GateHouse Media that same year). In December 2006, GateHouse also acquired the Taunton Daily Gazette, a daily newspaper serving the same area which would serve as a sister publication to the Taunton Call. On July 16, 2008, publication of The Taunton Call ceased, as part of a larger consolidation effort by GateHouse in relation to free weeklies which competed with paid daily newspapers.

== Sisters and competitors ==
The Taunton Call's sister papers as part of the Call Group were The Raynham Call and The Lakeville Call. This identity was retained under Memorial Press Group, and under CNC these papers became part of that organization's "South Unit". Under GateHouse Media New England, sister papers included those of the original Call Group, as well as the Taunton Daily Gazette.
