= Alta Group Newspapers =

Alta Group Newspapers Inc.
- Industry: Newspapers
- Founded: 1977
- Defunct: November 1996
- Fate: Bought
- Successor: Community Newspaper Company
- Headquarters: Biddeford, Maine; United States
- Key people: Alta Whitehouse Foster, founder Dennis J. Flaherty, president
- Products: Journal Tribune, The Milford Daily News and two other papers

Alta Group Newspapers Inc. was a newspaper publisher in the northeastern United States, overseeing three daily newspapers and one weekly newspaper before being bought and broken up by Community Newspaper Company in 1996.

The company's flagship property was the Journal Tribune in Biddeford, Maine. Its most profitable newspaper was The Milford Daily News in Massachusetts. It also ran The Evening Times of Little Falls, New York, and the weekly The Northern Light in Conway, New Hampshire.

== History ==
Managed as a trust by Bank of Boston, Alta was formed in 1977 to oversee four newspapers and five charities owned by the Foster and Whitehouse families.

In May 1996, the bank announced it would sell the chain in order to meet financial obligations to the trust's beneficiaries.

CNC, which already owned daily newspapers bordering The Milford Daily News on the north and east (the Middlesex News and Daily Transcript, respectively), emerged as the top bidder later that year. Bill Elfers, CNC's CEO, called the Milford paper "an outstanding property". It had made nearly US$5 million in revenues the year before, out of about US$10 million for the full Alta chain, which cleared about US$1 million after expenses (but before taxes).

Terms of the deal were not made public. It was CNC's first foray into newspaper ownership outside Massachusetts; at the time, some speculated that the company would quickly turn around and sell the New York and Maine dailies. Elfers denied these rumors, but within a year, CNC had indeed unloaded the Journal Tribune and Evening Times.

The Milford paper remains part of the CNC chain, now a division of GateHouse Media.
