= Old Colony Memorial (newspaper) =

Newspaper in Plymouth, Massachusetts

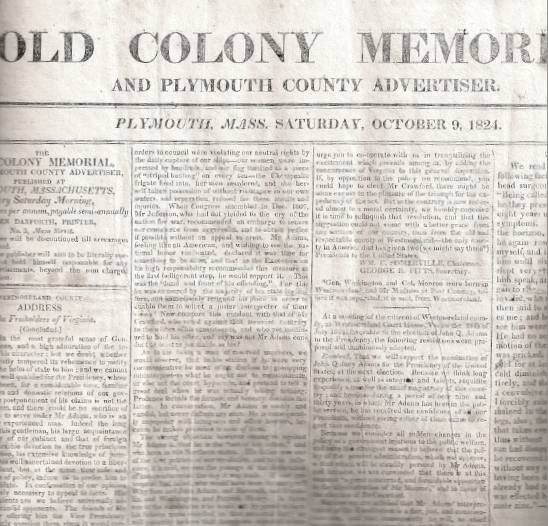
Old Colony Memorial, 1824

The Old Colony Memorial (est. 1822) is a semiweekly newspaper published in Plymouth, Massachusetts. USA Today Co. owns the paper; previous owners include the George W. Prescott Publishing Co. and the Memorial Press Group.

== History ==
=== 19th century ===
The Old Colony Memorial began in 1822. Publishers have included George F. Andrews, Winslow W. Avery, Allen Danforth, James A. Danforth, Charles Carroll Doten, William T. Hollis, John Morisey, Thomas Prince, James Thurber. Among the editors: Joseph Francis Bittinger.

In the 1830s, "connected with the printing office [was] a newspaper reading room where intelligence from various quarters [were] daily received, and [was] a pleasant resort for the reading gentlemen at their leisure hours. Under the same roof [was] a book-store and bindery, and a circulating library." In the 19th century its main competitor was the Plymouth Rock newspaper. In the 1880s the O.C. Memorial office stood on Court Street near Shirley Square, and by the 1900s on Middle Street.

=== 20th–21st century ===
K. Prescott Low, whose family had published The Patriot Ledger for a century, purchased Memorial Press Group (MPG) in 1979 and incorporated it into the privately owned George W. Prescott Publishing Company. Thirty years later, however, in 1997, Low found that "mega-players competing with us" made family ownership of the Ledger and MPG uneconomic, and sought to sell them.

A buyer quickly emerged: James F. Plugh, owner of The Enterprise, the Brockton daily newspaper that competed with the Ledger and several MPG papers. Plugh's Newspaper Media LLC, later renamed Enterprise NewsMedia, bought the Prescott Publishing for an estimated US$60 to US$70 million.

Liberty Publishing purchased Enterprise NewsMedia in 2006 as part of a mammoth deal that also included Community Newspaper Company (CNC) – then owned by the Boston Herald – and a new name for the parent company, GateHouse Media.

== See also ==
- Memorial Press Group
- List of Community Newspaper Company weeklies
