= Cape Cod Publishing Company =

US publisher of weekly newspapers

Cape Cod Publishing Co.
- Industry: Newspapers
- Founded: September 1990
- Defunct: January 11, 1996
- Fate: Dissolved into parent
- Successor: Community Newspaper Company
- Headquarters: Orleans, Massachusetts, U.S.
- Key people: Greg O'Brien, president 1990-1993; Vicki Ogden, president 1993-1996
- Products: Weekly newspapers on Cape Cod
- Parent: Fidelity Investments

Cape Cod Publishing Company, based in Orleans, Massachusetts, United States, was a publisher of weekly newspapers in the 1990s. It was created by Fidelity Investments as a holding company for newspapers acquired on Cape Cod, and eventually folded into Fidelity's Community Newspaper Company. CNC is now owned by GateHouse Media.

== History ==
Four years before Cape Cod Publishing was formed, Fidelity Investments had provided some financing in Cape publisher Barry Paster's successful bid for North Shore Weeklies. The North Shore papers eventually became the first component of Fidelity's newspaper chain, which came to be known as Community Newspaper Company.

In 1990, Paster sold his original paper, The Register of Yarmouth—to Fidelity, which also picked up The Cape Codder of Orleans, a twice-weekly covering the Outer Cape, from longtime publisher Malcolm Hobbs.

The company grew substantially in 1991 with the purchase of 12 weekly newspapers, known as ‘’Cape Cod Newspapers’’, from Memorial Press Group, including the Yarmouth Sun, Dennis Bulletin, Bourne Courier, Cape Cod News, Cape Cod Oracle (later, split into Oracles in Harwich, Brewster, Orleans, Wellfleet, Eastham and the ‘’Chatham Current’’), Mashpee Messenger and Village Broadsider. The combined circulation of The Register and the Cape Codder was given, at the time, as 27,000; the new additions—two paid weeklies and 10 free papers—added 60,000.

Cape Cod Publishing held on to this core through the mid-1990s, until it was dissolved in early 1996. CNC realigned its operating units by geography, although the Cape papers were transferred wholesale to CNC's new "Cape Unit", a division of the South Unit.

By 1999, several of the Cape papers had closed or been consolidated: Cape Cod News was gone, and the company's Bourne, Mashpee and Sandwich properties were consolidated into one publication, the Upper Cape Codder. Later separated, the Bourne and Sandwich newspapers were closed again by GateHouse/Gannett in the summer of 2021.

== Properties ==
Since its founding in 1990, Cape Cod Publishing and its successor, CNC's Cape Unit (part of the South Unit) have published several free "Pennysaver" publications as well as several weekly newspapers on Cape Cod:

- Bourne Courier of Bourne (bought from MPG, 1991; closed, 1999; reopened, 2007, closed in 2021)
- Cape Cod News of Barnstable (bought from MPG, 1991; closed, late 1990s)
- Cape Codder of Orleans (bought from Malcolm Hobbs, 1990)
- Falmouth Bulletin of Falmouth (started by CNC, 2007)
- Harwich Oracle of Harwich (was Cape Cod Oracle; bought from MPG, 1991)
- Mashpee Messenger of Mashpee (bought from MPG, 1991; closed, 1999)
- Sandwich Broadcaster of Sandwich (was Village Broadcaster; bought from MPG, 1991; closed, 1999; reopened, 2007; closed in 2021)
- The Register of Yarmouth (bought from Barry Paster, 1990)
- Upper Cape Codder of Sandwich (started by CNC, 1999; closed, 2007)

Several of the papers cover adjoining towns, as well: the Courier now circulates in Mashpee (replacing the defunct Messenger); the Cape Codder covers the territory from Orleans to Provincetown; The Register covers Barnstable and Dennis; the Upper Cape Codder for eight years covered Bourne, Falmouth, Mashpee and Sandwich.
