= The Medfield Press =

- Type: Weekly newspaper
- Format: Broadsheet
- Owner(s): GateHouse Media
- Publisher: Kirk A. Davis
- Editor-in-chief: Richard Lodge
- Editor: Rob Borkowski
- Founded: 1922; 103 years ago
- Headquarters: 1091 Washington Street, Norwood, Massachusetts 02062 United States
- Price: US$1.00 weekly
- Website: Medfield Press

The Medfield Press is a Thursday weekly newspaper covering Medfield, Massachusetts, United States, serving the suburb of Boston. It is one of more than 100 weeklies published by Community Newspaper Company, a division of GateHouse Media.

The newspaper covers local news, features and events. The publication is staffed by Editor and reporter Rob Borkowski and Staff Photographer Erin Prawoko. The paper also uses a number of regular correspondents, including Photographer Sean Browne, Sports Reporter Josh Centor, News Reporter Jennifer Roach and News Reporter Cathy Pray.

== History ==
The Medfield Press was part of Suburban World Newspapers when The Boston Herald bought the company in 2001 and dissolved it into Community Newspaper Company, the largest weeklies publisher in Massachusetts. Community Newspaper Company was in turn bought by GateHouse Media in 2006.
