= Norfolk Newspaper Company =

Newspaper publisher in USA

Norfolk Newspaper Co.
- Industry: Newspapers
- Defunct: January 11, 1996
- Fate: Bought, then dissolved
- Successor: Community Newspaper Company
- Headquarters: 154 Copeland Drive, Mansfield, Massachusetts 02048; United States
- Products: Weekly newspapers
- Parent: Fidelity Investments, 1990-1996

Norfolk Newspaper Company, based in Mansfield, Massachusetts, United States, founded three weekly newspapers in the suburbs south of Boston before being bought by Fidelity Investments in 1990 and dissolved into Community Newspaper Company six years later.

The company's weeklies are still published by CNC, which is now owned by GateHouse Media and is the largest publisher of weeklies in Massachusetts.

Norfolk was one of Fidelity's first acquisitions as it built CNC in the 1990s. It was dissolved in early 1996, when CNC realigned its operating units by geography, assigning the papers to its new West Unit.

== Properties ==
At the time of its sale to CNC, Norfolk consisted of the following weeklies:

- Mansfield News of Mansfield and Norfolk
- Sharon Advocate of Sharon
- Norton Mirror of Norton
