= Old Colony =

Old Colony may refer to one of the following:

- Plymouth Colony, the first permanent English colony in New England, on land that is now part of the U.S. state of Massachusetts
  - Old Colony Historical Society in Taunton, Massachusetts
  - Old Colony Housing Project in Boston, Massachusetts
  - Old Colony League, a high school athletic conference in Massachusetts
  - Old Colony Memorial, a weekly newspaper based in Plymouth, Massachusetts
  - Old Colony Railroad, in operation in southeastern Massachusetts during 1845–1893
    - Old Colony Lines, branches of the MBTA commuter rail system in Massachusetts
  - Old Colony Regional Vocational Technical High School, in Rochester, Massachusetts
- Old Colony Mennonites, a Mennonite group, many of which live across North America
- Old Colony Trust Co. v. Commissioner, a United States Supreme Court income tax decision
