= Steve Buckley (journalist) =

American journalist

Steve Buckley (born 1956) is an American journalist and long-time sports writer who formerly wrote for the Boston Herald. In 2018, he joined sports website The Athletic.

== Career ==
Buckley started his career at the Westfield Evening News and later moved to the Portland Press Herald. He was a regular columnist with the Boston Herald from 1995 to 2018, contributing to the paper's Sports section. In 2018, he joined sports website The Athletic. His columns often used historical perspective drawn from a diverse variety of sources. He joined Boston Sports radio station WEEI in 1993 and has been a regular on the station's The Big Show since its debut in 1995. He also makes regular appearances on New England Sports Tonight on CSN New England and on WBZ-TV's "Sports Final". Prior to joining the Herald, he was a columnist with the National Sports Daily. Buckley is a member of the Baseball Writers' Association of America.

In 1999 he wrote and produced I'll be Seeing You: An American Story of World War II, a one-hour documentary, for NECN. He received a New England Emmy for best sports feature in 1998. He has been a frequent guest on SportsDesk on NESN.

In addition to his regular columns, he has written numerous articles for Boston Magazine, Yankee Magazine, and other periodicals, as well as several books. Red Sox: Where Have You Gone? appeared in 2005. With Jim Caple, he authored The Best Boston Sports Arguments (2006). His book Wicked Good Year (2009) chronicled the Celtics, Red Sox, and Patriots during the 2007 season.

Beyond writing, Buckley hosted a WEEI podcast Two Outs from 2017 to 2018 with fellow gay Boston sportswriter Alex Reimer. The two men would publish two episodes of the podcast each month discussing topical LGBTQ+ issues in sports.

Buckley organizes a yearly event: The Old Time Baseball Game, played at St. Peter's Field in Cambridge, MA. The game celebrates the U.S. national pastime as it was played around the turn of the century. The game is noted for the collection of authentic wool uniforms.

== Biography ==
A native of Cambridge, Buckley is a 1978 graduate of the University of Massachusetts Amherst and started his newspaper career at the Westfield Evening News. He currently lives in Somerville, MA.

In a column that appeared in the January 6, 2011 edition of the Boston Herald, Buckley came out as gay. He spent the afternoon as a guest host on WEEI's "The Big Show" addressing callers and explaining his column from that morning.
