= Saugus Advertiser =

Newspaper based in Saugus, Massachusetts

- Type: Weekly newspaper
- Owner: GateHouse Media New England
- Publisher: GateHouse Media New England
- Founded: 1946
- Ceased publication: 2022
- Headquarters: 75 Sylvan Street, C 105, Danvers, Massachusetts 01923 United States

The Saugus Advertiser was an American newspaper covering the town of Saugus, Massachusetts. It was the newspaper of record in Saugus, as it was the only place Saugus legal notices were printed.

== History ==
The Saugus Advertiser was founded by Colonel Alfred Woodward in 1946. He remained the newspaper's publisher until his death in 1970. He was succeeded by his wife, Virginia. In 1983 she sold the paper to Andrew P. Quigley, who also published the Chelsea Record, the Winthrop Sun Transcript and the East Boston Sun-Transcript. It was later purchased by Neil P. Collins and Mary L. N. McGrew. In 1990 they sold the paper to North Shore Weeklies. In 1996, North Shore Weeklies was dissolved by its parent company, Community Newspaper Company. CNC was later purchased by GateHouse Media, who dissolved CNC into GateHouse Media New England in 2011. In 2022, parent company Gannett ceased publishing the paper, merging it with another Gannett owned paper, the Melrose Free Press Observer, to form The Free Press & Advertiser.
