= Horace Greeley Award =

The Horace Greeley Award is a New England award for public service journalism.

== History ==
It is an annual and regional American journalism award that recognizes excellence in the print media of New England and is named in honor of prominent 19th-century editor and publisher Horace Greeley. It is administered by the New England Press Association in Boston, Massachusetts, and awarded occasionally. The first award was given in 1966 to the Revere Journal.

== Winners ==
- Revere Journal (1966)
- Maura J. Casey of the New London Day
