= The Transcript & Journal =

Newspaper in Somerville, Massachusetts

- Type: Weekly newspaper
- Owner: USA Today Co.
- Founded: December 8, 1870 (as Somerville Journal)
- Language: English
- ISSN: 2832-1782
- OCLC number: 1317093157
- Website: wickedlocal.com/medfordtranscrip

The Transcript & Journal is a weekly newspaper published in Medford and Somerville, Massachusetts. It formed in 2022 from the merger of the Somerville Journal and the Medford Transcript.

== Early history ==
The first issue of the Somerville Journal was published December 8, 1870, by W. A. Greenough & Company, known for publishing directories. During the next few years the paper changed ownership several times, early owners including Russell H. Conwell, then a Somerville resident, and John A. Cummings, later mayor of the city. On October 20, 1876, the paper came under the control of the Somerville Journal Company, under the presidency of J. O. Hayden. Hayden later became president of two Somerville banks, and treasurer of Middlesex County. With the change of ownership, the paper, which had previously been printed in Boston, began to be printed in Somerville, first in an office on the third floor of the Hill Building in Union Square, then, in July 1894, in the Somerville Journal Building, built for that purpose. Other magazines printed in the Somerville Journal Building included the Journal of Education, the American Primary Teacher, and The Writer. A founder of The Writer, William Henry Hills, bought an interest in the Somerville Journal Company in 1890, and was reported as editor of the Journal and president of the Company in 1895.

The "Pencilings" column of the Journal became popular, with excerpts appearing in newspapers nationwide. It was started by George Russell Jackson, an editor of the Journal, continued for a year by C. H. Hoyt, and then, from January 1885, by Hills. Other notable people associated with the Journal include Leon M. Conwell, later Mayor of Somerville, and Barbara Galpin, one of the first women in the publishing business in Massachusetts.

A rival newspaper, the Somerville Citizen was started in 1888, first in the Stickney Building on Pearl Street, and later moved to Gilman Square. It was united with the Somerville Journal in 1901.

== Modern history ==
By the 1980s the Somerville Journal had been acquired by the Dole Publishing Company, publishers of the Cambridge Chronicle. When Dole was acquired by Fidelity Investments in 1991, it became the Bay State Newspaper Company, which in turn was merged into the Community Newspaper Company in 1996. This was sold by Fidelity in 2001 to the Boston Herald, which sold it in 2006 to GateHouse Media. During GateHouse ownership, the former CNC papers took on the present "Wicked Local" branding. In 2019 GateHouse was merged with Gannett, the largest newspaper publisher in the United States. In March 2022 Gannett announced plans to merge or discontinue many of its Massachusetts properties, including the Somerville Journal, which on May 12, 2022 was merged with the Medford Transcript to form The Transcript & Journal.

Later editors include:

- George Donnelly, 1987 to 1991
- Kathleen Powers, 2000 to 2009
- Debra Filcman, 2009 to 2011
- Jillian Fennimore, 2011 to 2012
- Erin Tiernan, 2016 to 2017
- Kathryn Bowler, 2017 to 2018
- Julia Taliesin, 2018 to 2021

By at least 2018, editor Julia Taliesin was simultaneously the paper's only full-time reporter.

== Gallery ==
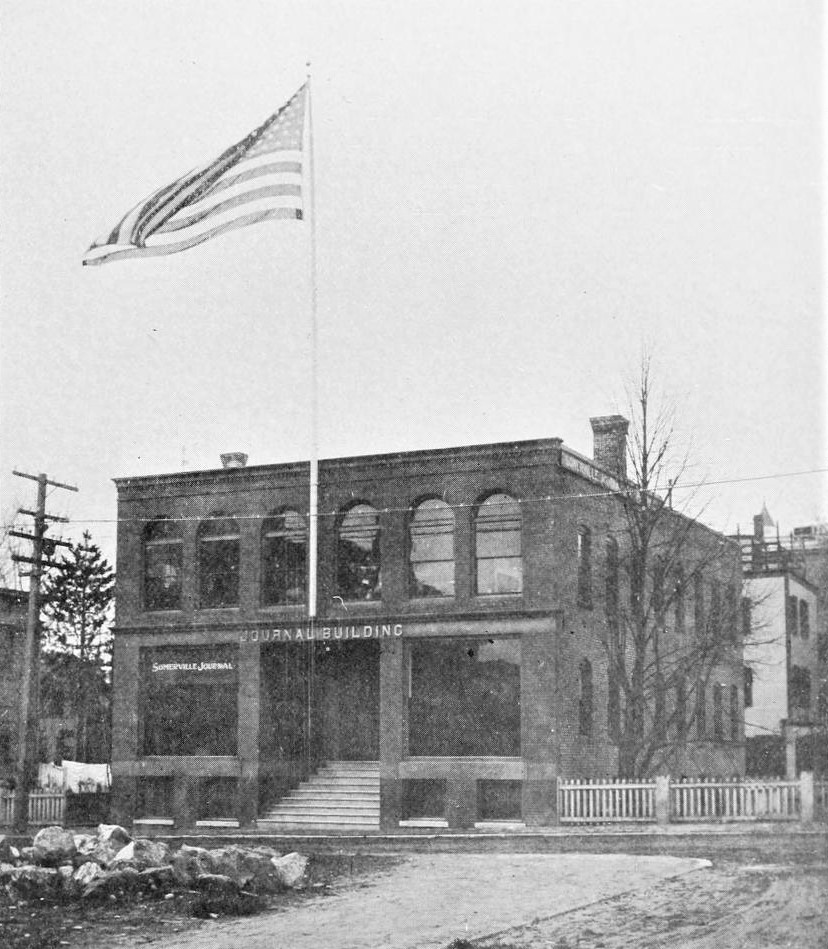
The Somerville Journal Building, circa 1897

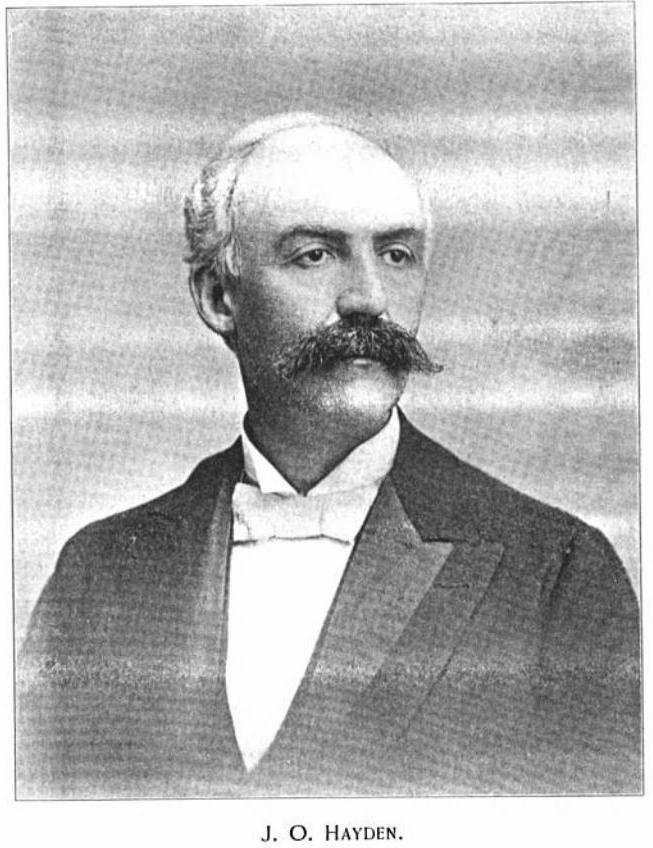
J. O. Hayden, Somerville Journal publisher circa 1897
