= Barbara Galpin =

American journalist

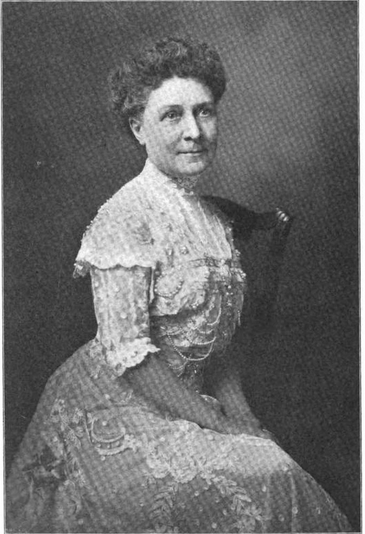
- Born: Nelly Barbara Johnson; February 6, 1855; Weathersfield, Vermont, U.S.
- Died: August 14, 1922 (aged 67); New Haven, Connecticut, U.S.
- Occupation: journalist
- Spouse: Henry Wallace Galpin (m. 1873; died 1875)
- Children: George Henry Galpin
- Writing career
- Language: English

Barbara Galpin (née, Johnson; February 6, 1855 – August 14, 1922) was an American journalist. For twenty-five years, Galpin was identified with the Somerville Journal, serving as compositor, proof reader, cashier, editor woman's page and assistant manager. Galpin traveled extensively in the United States and Europe, writing books and articles of travel, and lectured upon this subject. She was the writer of several books and contributed prose and poetry to magazines. She took an interest in hospital, charitable, and educational work, and when the Massachusetts Legislature provided for a "planning board" in every city of more than 10,000 people, the mayor of the city named her, with six men, on the Somerville board—the first woman in the state to occupy such a position.

== Early life and education ==
Nellie Barbara Johnson was born in Weathersfield, Vermont, February 6, 1855, or 1856. She was the daughter of Henry Clay Johnson. Her mother's maiden name was Helen Frances Jones. From four years of age she lived in Claremont, New Hampshire, where she was educated at the public schools and Stevens High School, and under private teachers.

== Career ==
At Somerville, on August 25, 1873, at the age of sixteen, she married Henry Wallace Galpin (1819–1875), a well-to-do gentleman, many years her senior. One son, George Henry Galpin (b. September 9, 1874), was born to them. On May 31, 1875, when she was only eighteen, her husband died. Complications in business matters wrecked the estate, and left her dependent upon her own endeavors.

She found a job at the compositor's case of the Somerville paper, where she soon became an expert. Incidentally she held copy, and at her own suggestion, began to edit manuscript, through which editing she first attracted attention. She soon became a proof-reader, and gave the paper its distinction for typographical as well as literary excellence. From this, she moved to editorial management, which she combined with promotion of circulation, where her business ability first showed itself. When the proprietor became the treasurer of Middlesex County, Galpin assumed the management of the business details, while retaining oversight of the circulation schemes and all literary and special features of the paper.

The "Woman's Page", which she conducted, and which was one of the leading features of the paper, was on as high a level as the work in any of the popular literary weeklies, and would of itself give her distinction in journalism. Her many series of articles on travel, both in the United States and in Europe, were among the most readable and instructive of their kind in magazine literature. One of the most complete of her series was issued in book form, under the caption In Foreign Lands. Her historical articles attracted even more attention, and one of these was published by the Somerville Historical Society as its first official issue. As a writer of verse and songs, Galpin won high praise. She was equally fortunate in public speaking. Her prominence in various lines of activity led to invitations to make addresses before women's clubs, historical societies, and various other associations. Her platform work was as carefully prepared as the work from her pen, and her reputation as a speaker was equal to that in literary effort. Her most important addresses in point of honor were before the Suburban Press Association of New England and the Woman's Congress at the World's Columbian Exposition in 1893.

One of her articles led to the first meeting of the Heptorean Club of Somerville, of which she was one of the organizers. She became a charter member, served as treasurer as well as on the Board of Directors, and had influence in making this one of the leading women's clubs of the country. Galpin was also a charter member of the New England Woman's Press Club, of which she was treasurer for several years. Galpin was also a member of the Authors' Guild of New York, League of American Pen Women, Boston Authors Club, Professional Woman's Club, and various local organizations.

At the completion of twenty-five years in journalism in one office and under one management, in the fall of 1903, the citizens of Somerville gave Galpin a reception and dinner at the Vendome in Boston, as a testimonial of their appreciation of her efforts in all lines of work in the city. She was a leader in many philanthropic and progressive civic movements. She won distinction as a writer and as a speaker, in society and in philanthropy, though her energies were largely devoted to the literary and office direction of a prosperous weekly journal.

== Personal life ==
Galpin gave her son a liberal and professional education. She had a home on Spring Hill. She died August 14, 1922, in New Haven, Connecticut.

== Selected works ==
- In Foreign Lands, 1892
- History of Somerville journalism, 1901
- A helpful thought for every day, 1917
