= Suburban World Newspapers =

- Industry: Newspapers
- Founded: 1978
- Defunct: February 2001
- Fate: Bought and dissolved
- Successor: Community Newspaper Company
- Headquarters: Needham, Massachusetts; United States
- Key people: William Barrett, founder and owner
- Products: Seven weekly newspapers in eastern Massachusetts
- Number of employees: 2001: 43

Suburban World Newspapers, based in Needham, Massachusetts, United States, was a privately owned publisher of seven weekly newspapers in the suburbs west of Boston in the 1980s and 1990s.

The Boston Herald bought the company in 2001 and dissolved it into Community Newspaper Company, the largest weeklies publisher in Massachusetts. After the sale, Suburban World's two youngest newspapers were closed, while the others remain part of CNC, now owned by GateHouse Media.

== History ==
Newspaper publisher William Barrett founded Suburban World in 1978 after purchasing four newspapers in towns west of Boston. Suburban World's success caused Barrett to expand twice, adding papers in Westwood in 1987 and in Millis and Norfolk in 1995.

By contrast, the papers he bought in 1978 all had deep community roots: the Natick newspaper had been founded in 1865; two more dated from the early 20th century, and the youngest had been founded in 1956.

The newspapers developed a reputation for quality. Kirk Davis, who oversaw Suburban World's competitors in his role as publisher of Community Newspaper Company, said Suburban World did "an outstanding job, in some instances a better job than we were doing".

In 2001, Barrett, 56, decided to sell his newspapers for an undisclosed amount of money to his longtime competitor, which had long expressed an interest in buying Suburban World. The deal came shortly after CNC had been sold to the Boston Herald.

The move filled some gaps in CNC's coverage map, but also set up conflicts with previous CNC papers, notably the former MetroWest Tab newspapers. Eventually, the competing Tabs were closed and the Suburban World papers—most of which had decades-long histories in their communities, whereas the Tabs dated from the 1990s—remain in CNC today.

Two Suburban World papers were closed, however, prompting some reader backlash in Millis and Norfolk. Subscribers of the papers complained about a loss of local focus when CNC decided, soon after the sale, to fold them into the Country Gazette, a regional paper based in nearby Franklin.

== Properties ==
At the time of its sale to CNC in February 2001, Suburban World Newspapers consisted of the following titles, with a total weekly circulation of 26,000:

- Dover-Sherborn Press of Dover and Sherborn (founded 1956)
- Medfield Press of Medfield (founded 1922)
- Millis Press of Millis (founded 1995; closed 2001)
- Natick Bulletin of Natick (founded 1865)
- Needham Times of Needham (founded 1932)
- Norfolk Press of Norfolk (founded 1995; closed 2001)
- Westwood Press of Westwood (founded 1987)

The Dover-Sherborn, Natick and Needham papers are still published as part of GateHouse Media in CNC's Metro Unit; the Medfield and Westwood papers are in the West Unit.
