= Jim Caple =

American sportswriter (1962–2023)

Jim Caple (1962 – October 1, 2023) was an American columnist and senior writer for ESPN.com. He worked previously with the Seattle Post-Intelligencer and the St. Paul Pioneer Press.

== Life and career ==
Caple was born in 1962. He attended R.A. Long High School in Longview, Washington. He graduated from the University of Washington in Seattle, where he reported for and later became an editor of the school newspaper, The Daily. He worked at the Post-Intelligencer and the Pioneer Press before spending 17 years with ESPN. His time at ESPN included writing articles for its Page 2 website, which took a more comedic look at sports. He last wrote for The Athletic.

Caple covered 20 World Series and 12 Olympic Games. Caple wrote the book The Devil Wears Pinstripes. He also co-wrote the book Best Boston Sports Arguments with fellow sportswriter Steve Buckley and wrote a novel, The Navigator, which was partially based on his father's stint as a B-24 navigator in World War II.

On October 2, 2023, his wife Vicki wrote that he died the previous day. At the time of his death, he suffered from ALS and dementia. He was 61.

== Publications ==
- The Devil Wears Pinstripes. Penguin Group. 2005. ISBN 9780452285989.
- Caple, Jim; Buckley, Steve (2006). The Best Boston Sports Arguments. Sourcebooks. ISBN 9781402249976.
- The Navigator. JaCol Publishing. 2019. ISBN 9781946675453.
