= The Westwood Press =

- Type: Weekly newspaper
- Format: Broadsheet
- Owner: GateHouse Media
- Publisher: Kirk A. Davis
- Editor-in-chief: Richard Lodge
- Editor: Rob Borkowski
- Founded: 1987
- Headquarters: 1091 Washington Street, Norwood, Massachusetts 02062 United States
- Website: wickedlocal.com/westwood

The Westwood Press is a Thursday weekly newspaper covering Westwood, Massachusetts, United States, serving the suburb of Boston. It is one of more than 100 weeklies published by Community Newspaper Company, a division of GateHouse Media.

== History ==
The Westwood Press was part of Suburban World Newspapers when the Boston Herald bought the company in 2001 and dissolved it into Community Newspaper Company, the largest weeklies publisher in Massachusetts. Community Newspaper Company was in turn bought by GateHouse Media in 2006.
