= Somerville Journal Building =

- U.S. National Register of Historic Places
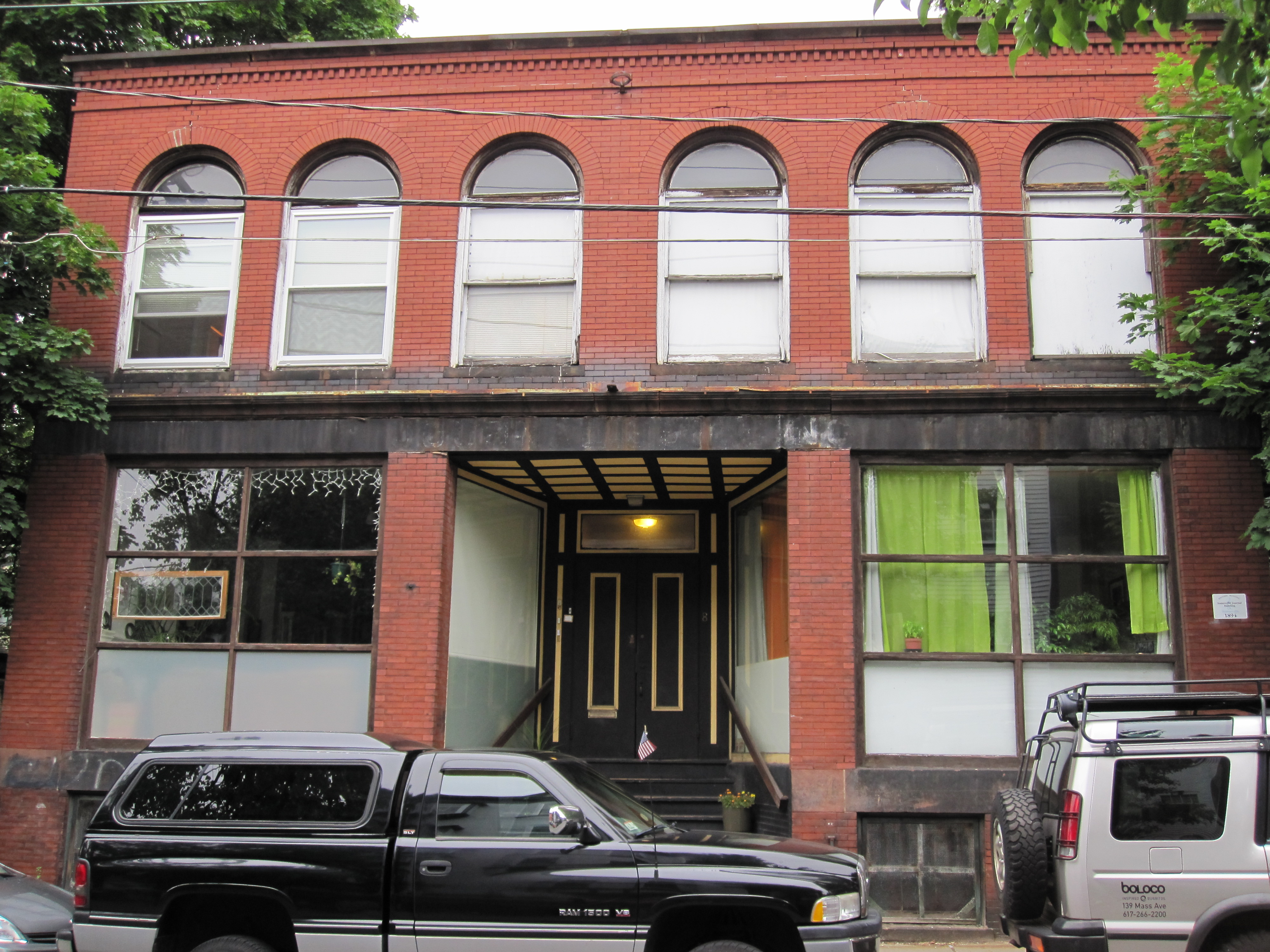

- Location within Massachusetts Location within the United States
- Location: 8–10 Walnut Street, Somerville, Massachusetts
- Coordinates: 42°22′53.29″N 71°5′49.09″W
- Built: 1894
- Architect: William H. Gerrish
- Architectural style: Renaissance
- MPS: Somerville MPS
- NRHP reference No.: 89001300
- Added to NRHP: September 18, 1989

The Somerville Journal Building is a historic commercial building in Somerville, Massachusetts. It was built in 1894 as offices and the printing facility for the Somerville Journal, a weekly publication that continues to exist as part of the "Wicked Local" franchise of GateHouse Media. The building, a somewhat typical example of late 19th-century commercial architecture, was listed on the National Register of Historic Places in 1989.

== Description and history ==
The Journal Building is set on the west side of Walnut Street, near its southern end in Union Square. It is a two-story brick structure, with a single storefront on the ground floor that has plate glass windows flanking a recessed entrance. The second story has six round-arch openings originally filled with sash windows, which were updated with double hung windows in 2012. A corbelled cornice is set below the roof, and a brownstone stringcourse separates the basement from the ground floor.

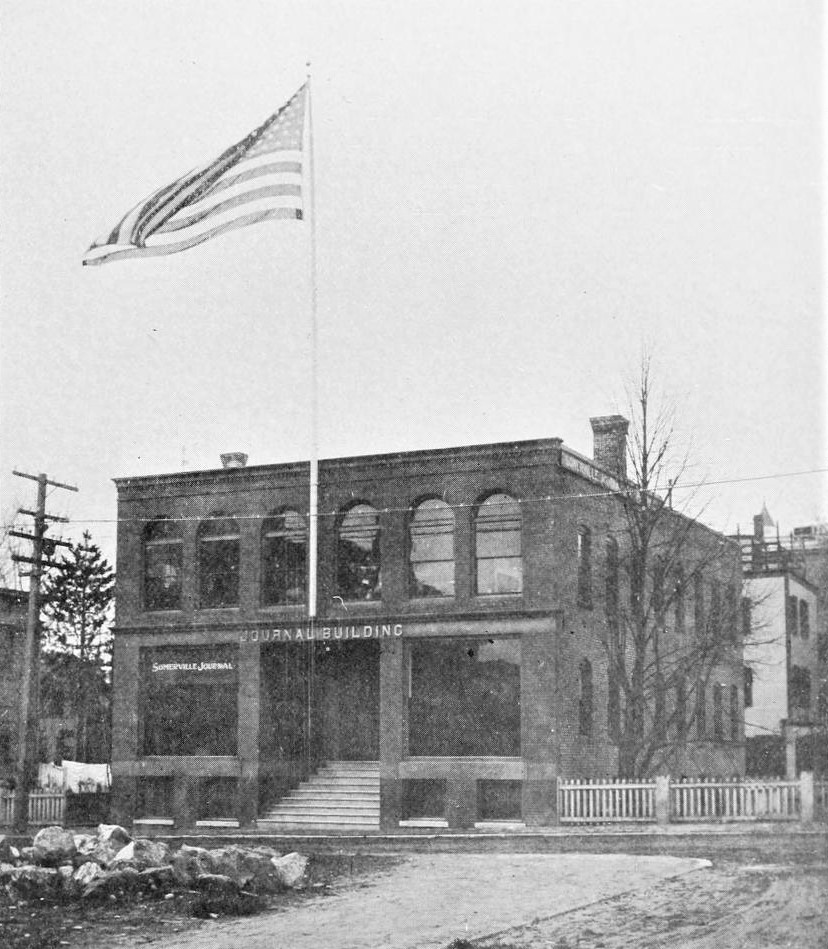
The Somerville Journal Building, circa 1897

The Somerville Journal was founded in 1870, and had this building constructed in 1894 to house a new generation of printing equipment. The building was designed by William H. Gerrish (1865–1915), a Lowell engineer. Its styling is typical of other small commercial buildings built in Union Square, which was then the city's commercial business center. Administrative and editorial offices were on the first floor. Production and typesetting were on the second floor, and printing presses and equipment were located in the basement. The Somerville Journal vacated the building in approximately the 1950s. Through the 1960s, the building was used as a Kodak facility offering developing, printing, and enlarging. During the 1970s the building was used as a youth recreation center for the city of Somerville. It has been used as artist studios since the 1970s. After housing a vintage retail store and studios, it now sits vacant.

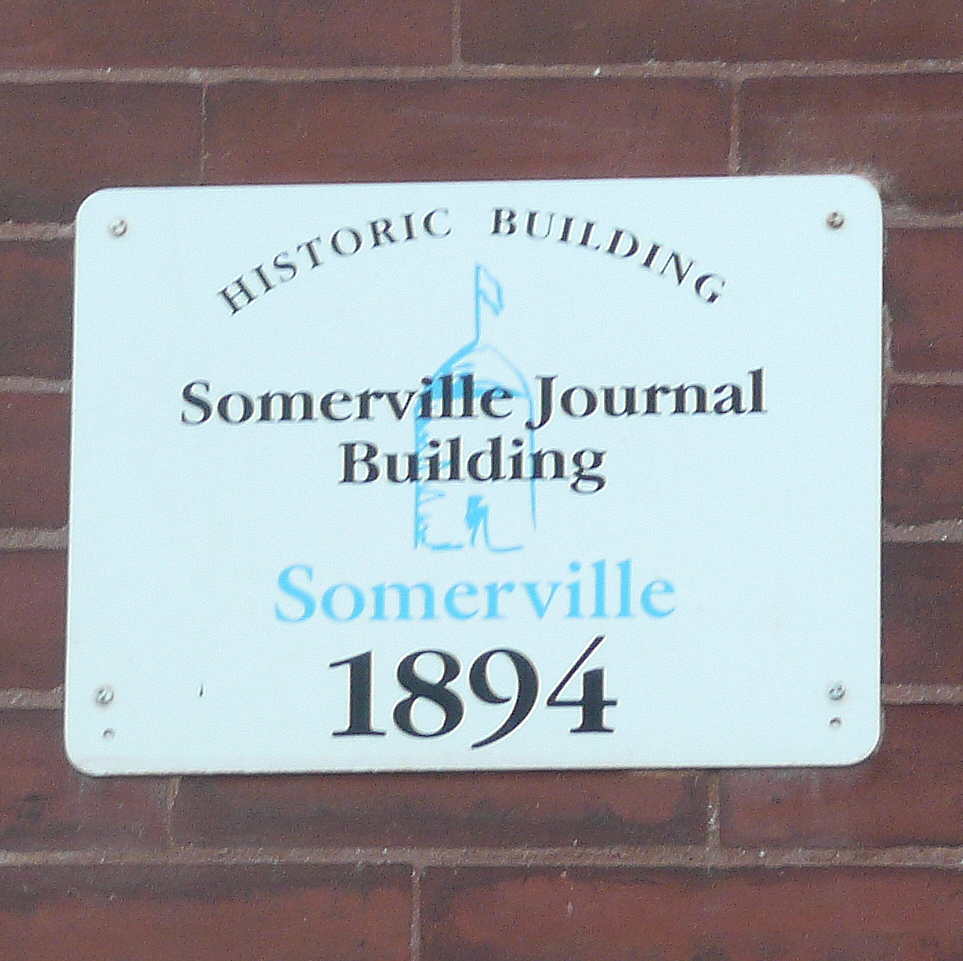
The identifying sign on the face of the Somerville Journal Building

== See also ==
- National Register of Historic Places listings in Somerville, Massachusetts
