= Daily Times Chronicle =

Daily American newspaper

- Type: Daily newspaper
- Format: Broadsheet
- Owner(s): Woburn Daily Times Inc.
- Publisher: Peter M Haggerty
- Editor: James D Haggerty lll
- Founded: 1901
- Headquarters: 1 Arrow Drive, Woburn, Massachusetts 01801 United States
- Circulation: 11,195 (as of 2007)
- Price: USD 1.25 daily
- Website: homenewshere.com

The Daily Times Chronicle is a family-owned five-day (Monday through Friday) daily newspaper published in Woburn, Massachusetts, with separate daily editions and associated weekly newspapers covering several towns along Massachusetts Route 128 in eastern Middlesex County.

The newspaper was formerly known as the Woburn Daily Times and Reading Chronicle. It also publishes The Stoneham Independent, Tewksbury Town Crier and Wilmington Town Crier.

== Today's paper ==
Printed on non-holiday weekdays only, the Daily Times Chronicle looks different in each of the towns it covers, with separate editions, editors and reporters for Burlington, Reading, Winchester and Woburn.

One of the paper's quirks is that it does not publish unsigned editorials on its opinion page, and that it publishes letters to the editor on its local news pages.

Sports lead off the Daily Times Chronicle's second of two sections, which often also includes a society news page. Sports coverage, as with news coverage, is intensely local, often with no or only one regional or national story—written by the Associated Press—on the front page.

== History ==
Woburn's Haggerty family—specifically, James D. Haggerty, Paul L. Haggerty and James D. Haggerty Jr.-- owned and served as editors and publishers of the paper since it was founded as the Woburn Daily Times in 1901 through 1980. In 1967, the Haggertys bought the Reading Chronicle, and in 1981 merged the weekly Chronicle into the Daily Times to create the current newspaper. The newspaper's main office and printing plant is located at 1 Arrow Drive in Woburn, although it retains a news bureau, the former Chronicle office, on Main Street in Reading. Since 1980 the newspaper has been owned and operated by the grandsons of James D. Haggerty including Peter Haggerty, Publisher; Richard P. Haggerty, General Manager; James D. Haggerty III, Editor; and Mark Haggerty, Business Manager.

The Daily Times was headquartered from 1921 to 1987 at 23-25 Montvale Avenue in downtown Woburn. That building was targeted by an arsonist January 19, 1985, who set 12 fires in the press room, causing $200,000 in damage.

The building was sold to Peterson School of Steam Engineering after the newspaper moved to its Arrow Drive plant.

Since 1987 the company has operated out of a 40,000-square-foot (3,700 m^{2}) building located 1 Arrow Drive in Woburn.

== Sisters and competitors ==
In addition to the five local editions of the daily newspaper, Woburn Daily Times Inc. publishes three weekly newspapers in adjoining towns and a weekly supplement, Middlesex East, that runs in both the daily and the weeklies, as well as The Lynnfield Villager and North Reading Transcript, which are owned separately. The three weeklies owned by Woburn Daily Times Inc. are:

- The Stoneham Independent, founded in 1870, published each Wednesday from an office on Main Street in Stoneham, Massachusetts. Average circulation was 4,000 in 2006.
- The Tewksbury Town Crier and Wilmington Town Crier, published each Wednesday in Tewksbury and Wilmington, Massachusetts, respectively.

The Daily Times Chronicle competes with several newspapers for readers. Aside from The Boston Globe, which attracts many readers who prefer a regional view, Wakefield readers have a hometown daily, The Wakefield Daily Item; and The Sun of Lowell competes in Tewksbury. Several weekly newspapers owned by Community Newspaper Company also compete with the locally owned Daily Times company. These titles include the Burlington Union, Reading Advocate, Stoneham Sun, Wakefield Observer, Winchester Star and Woburn Advocate.
