= The Wellesley Townsman =

Massachusetts weekly newspaper

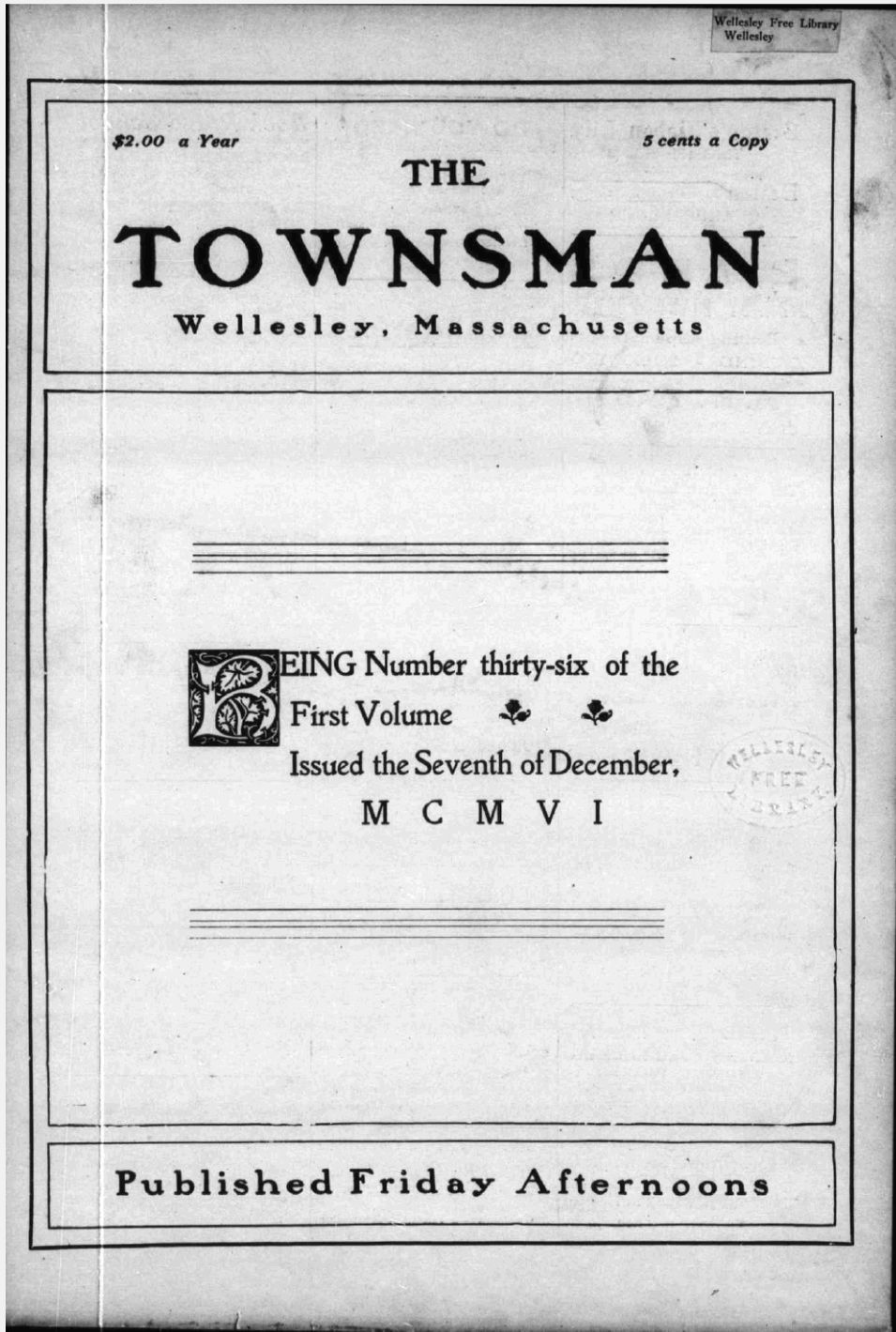
- The front page of The Townsman, from 1906
- Type: Weekly newspaper
- Format: Broadsheet
- Owner: USA Today Co.
- Editor: Cathy Brauner
- Founded: April 1906
- Headquarters: Wellesley, Massachusetts, United States
- Circulation: 6,500
- Website: wickedlocal.com/wellesleytownsman

The Wellesley Townsman is a paid weekly, local newspaper in Wellesley, Massachusetts. It is currently owned by USA Today Co.

== History ==
Debuting in April 1906, it originally was published on Friday afternoons by the Wellesley Publishing Company. It was one of many New England newspapers acquired by the Community Newspaper Company in the late 1980s, published under The MetroWest Daily News division, later acquired by GateHouse Media. It is currently published online through the Wicked Local network.

The Townsman was one of the early publishers of Sylvia Plath. Her short story "Victory" appeared in the paper during her teens, and the paper itself chronicled many of her early achievements. When Plath died of gas poisoning as result of a suicide, the paper famously misreported the cause of death in the obituary, giving the cause of death as viral pneumonia.
