= The Independent Newspaper Group =

American newspaper publisher

The Independent Newspaper Group (ING) is an American newspaper publishing company based in Revere, Massachusetts. It serves Revere, Chelsea, Winthrop, Everett, Lynn and many neighborhoods of Boston, and had a circulation of 76,100. As of 2013, Stephen Quigley is the president and majority shareholder. Joshua Resnek cofounded and served as vice president for twelve years. The other cofounders and current shareholders are Deb DiGregorio, Cary Shuman, Maureen DiBella, Seth Daniel and John Lynds.

== Holdings ==
ING papers include:

Boston, Massachusetts

- Boston Sun (formerly Back Bay Sun)
- Beacon Hill Times
- Charlestown Patriot-Bridge
- East Boston Times Free Press
- Jamaica Plain Gazette
- Logan Times (serves Logan Airport)
- Mission Hill Gazette
- North End Regional Review

Chelsea, Massachusetts

- Chelsea Record

Everett, Massachusetts

- Everett Independent

Lynn, Massachusetts

- Lynn Journal

Revere, Massachusetts

- Revere Journal

Winthrop, Massachusetts

- Winthrop Transcript
