= Maura J. Casey =

American journalist

Maura J. Casey is an American journalist. She is the founder and principal of the communications firm CaseyInk, LLC of Franklin, Connecticut. She was on the Editorial Board of The New York Times from 2006 to 2009. She contributed to stories at The Eagle-Tribune of Lawrence, Massachusetts, that were recognized by the 1988 Pulitzer Prize for General News Reporting, citing "an investigation that revealed serious flaws in the Massachusetts prison furlough system and led to significant statewide reforms." She was also a winner of the Horace Greeley Award, the Pulliam Editorial Fellowship, given to one editorial writer in the country once a year., and Scripps Howard's Walker Stone Award
