= Stoneham Independent =

Weekly newspaper in Massachusetts

The Stoneham Independent
- Type: Weekly newspaper
- Format: Broadsheet
- Owner: Woburn Daily Times Inc.
- Publisher: Peter M Haggerty
- Editor: Mark Haggerty
- Founded: 1870
- Headquarters: 1 Arrow Drive, Woburn, Massachusetts 01801 United States
- Circulation: 4,000 in 2007
- Website: homenewshere.com

The Stoneham Independent, founded in 1870, is published each Wednesday from offices at 1 Arrow Drive, Woburn, Massachusetts, United States.

== Sisters ==
The Stoneham Independent's parent company, Woburn Daily Times Inc., also publishes a daily newspaper and two additional weekly newspapers in adjoining towns, and a weekly supplement, Middlesex East.

Other Daily Times publications are:

- The Daily Times Chronicle, a daily serving Burlington, Reading, Wakefield, Winchester and Woburn, Massachusetts.
- The Tewksbury Town Crier and Wilmington Town Crier, published each Wednesday in Tewksbury and Wilmington, Massachusetts, respectively.
