= Fifty Plus Advocate =

Market news

- Type: Newspaper
- Publisher: Bagdon Advertising, Inc., David Bagdon, publisher
- Founded: 1975
- Headquarters: Westborough, Massachusetts United States
- Circulation: 25,000
- Website: www.fiftyplusadvocate.com

The Fifty Plus Advocate Newspaper was founded in January 1975. It is the oldest continuously published mature market publication in the United States. It was originally known as The Senior Advocate newspaper.

The founder and publisher in 1975 was Philip Davis. At the time he was 23 years old making him the youngest founder of a similar publication. His major influence in starting a senior newspaper was Maggie Kuhn, founder of the Gray Panthers. As a 22-year-old reporter, Davis heard Maggie Kuhn speak at Quinsigamond Community College in Worcester, Massachusetts. She talked about being forced to retire at 65. Davis found her speech very uplifting and decided to try to get into the senior newspaper field.

In 2012 Fifty Plus Advocate was purchased by David Bagdon, owner of Bagdon Advertising, Inc. Bagdon saw a publishing opportunity in focusing on the growing national trend of seniors becoming more active and vital, and maintaining physical health and mental acuity into their later years. In the United States, people over 50 are responsible for more than half of consumer spending, but no more than ten percent of marketing budgets are devoted to targeting them. The editorial content features articles about health and longevity, travel and recreation, financial stability in retirement, social issues and legislation affecting people over 50, and people over 50 with unique or inspirational personal and professional stories.

== Circulation ==
Circulation in 1975 was limited to Worcester County, Massachusetts. In 1988 the publication expanded into the Boston market. Currently it is distributed in Eastern and Central Massachusetts, from Boston to Worcester. Combined monthly circulation is 25,000 newspapers. In addition to mail subscriptions, the newspaper is distributed to over 600 high-traffic locations throughout Eastern and Central Massachusetts.

== www.fiftyplusadvocate.com ==
The Fifty Plus Advocate newspaper is partnered with www.fiftyplusadvocate.com. Multiple years of archived issues of the newspaper are available on the website.

== Awards ==
The Fifty Plus Advocate newspaper has won numerous awards including the Vision Action Leadership Award from the Massachusetts Association of Councils on Aging; Mature Media National Award for excellence in Journalism and North American Mature Publishers Association Award for editorial and design.
