= The Milford Daily News =

American newspaper

- Type: Daily newspaper
- Format: Broadsheet
- Owner: USA Today Co.
- Publisher: Lisa Stratton
- Editor: Anne Brennan
- Founded: 1887
- Headquarters: 197 Main Street, Milford, Massachusetts 01757, United States
- Circulation: 6,099 Daily; 6,183 Sunday (as of 2012)
- OCLC number: 22144065
- Website: milforddailynews.com

The Milford Daily News is an American daily newspaper covering Milford, Massachusetts, and several nearby towns in Norfolk and Worcester counties.

The newspaper is managed and printed by The MetroWest Daily News. Both are owned by USA Today Co.

== History ==
From 1977 to 1996, the newspaper was run by Alta Group Newspapers, a trust established by the Foster and Whitehouse families and managed by Bank of Boston. The trust also ran daily newspapers in Biddeford, Maine, and Little Falls, New York, as well as the family's charities.

To raise money for other obligations, the trust sold the papers in 1996 to CNC, then part of Fidelity Investments. CNC managers, upon their purchase of Alta, said they were most interested in the Milford property, which bordered the coverage area of two CNC dailies—the Middlesex News and the Dedham Transcript. Bill Elfers, CNC's CEO, called the Milford paper "an outstanding property"; it had made almost US$5 million in revenues the previous year, accounting for the largest part of Alta's US$1 million annual profit.

Terms of the deal were not made public. It was CNC's first foray into newspaper ownership outside Massachusetts; at the time, some speculated that the company would quickly turn around and sell the New York and Maine dailies; Elfers denied these rumors, but within a year, CNC had indeed unloaded the Maine and New York papers.

In 2000, Fidelity sold CNC to the publisher of the Boston Herald. The new owner instituted a content-sharing arrangement between CNC and the Herald, resulting in a regular stream of Daily News stories appearing in the Boston newspaper.

That arrangement continued even after the Herald sold CNC to Liberty Group Publishing (later renamed GateHouse Media) in 2006.
