= The Enterprise (Brockton) =

Newspaper in Massachusetts

- The April 6, 2007 front page of The Enterprise
- Type: Daily newspaper
- Format: Broadsheet
- Owner: USA Today Co.
- Publisher: Mark Olivieri
- Editor: Lisa Strattan
- Founded: c. 1881
- Headquarters: 5 Cohannet Street, Taunton, Massachusetts 02780, United States
- Circulation: 7,130 (as of 2018)
- ISSN: 0744-2114
- Website: enterprisenews.com

The Enterprise is an afternoon daily newspaper published in Brockton, Massachusetts. It is considered a newspaper of record for Brockton and nearby towns in northern Bristol and Plymouth counties, and southern Norfolk County.

== History ==
The Fuller-Thompson family owned The Enterprise for 115 years prior to its 1996 sale to joint venture headed by incumbent president Myron F. Fuller and new majority owner James F. Plugh, who was said to have paid between $20 million and $30 million. Plugh formed a new corporate parent for the paper, Newspaper Media Corporation, and expressed a desire to buy other New England newspapers.

Plugh in 1997 purchased The Patriot Ledger and its chain of weeklies, Memorial Press Group, paying an estimated $60 million to $70 million. As newspapers moved to the internet, the two afternoon dailies—whose reporters competed in 12 suburban towns—established a common website.

Six years later, Plugh yielded a majority stake in what was now known as Enterprise NewsMedia to Heritage Partners Inc., an investment firm based in Boston, Massachusetts. Heritage was said to have paid $113 million to buy into The Enterprise, The Patriot Ledger, and Memorial Press Group.

Plugh remained on board as publisher until 2004, when he became vice president of Enterprise NewsMedia and hired Kirk A. Davis as publisher.

In 2006, Enterprise NewsMedia was sold to Liberty Publishing, which changed its name to GateHouse Media as part of a $225 million deal including Community Newspaper Company and its four Massachusetts dailies. The company later purchased the Taunton Daily Gazette.

Headquartered in Fairport, N.Y., GateHouse is one of the largest publishers of locally based print and online media in the country as measured by its 86 daily publications. GateHouse serves local audiences of about 10 million per week across 21 states through 400 community publications and 350 local websites. The company also owns Propel Marketing, a provider of digital services to small and mid-sized companies.

In September 2013, an affiliate of the principal shareholder of GateHouse Media, Fortress Investment Group, purchased the Dow Jones Local Media Group. Among the eight daily and 25 weekly publications included in the sale were the Cape Cod Times, the Standard Times of New Bedford and the Portsmouth (N.H.) Herald. GateHouse manages all of those publications.

In November 2013, GateHouse emerged from prepackaged Chapter 11 bankruptcy proceedings, less than two months after filing to restructure $1.2 billion of debt that was scheduled to come due in August 2014. The company is now owner by New Media Investment Group Inc.

Michael Reed, director and chief executive officer of GateHouse, said the bankruptcy filing was a strategic decision to facilitate this restructuring, and GateHouse was able to continue operations while in Chapter 11 without disruption.

Pension, trade and all other unsecured creditors of GateHouse were not affected. Secured lenders, whose debt was cancelled under the plan, received choice of shares in New Media or a 40 percent cash distribution. The publicly traded shares of GateHouse were cancelled, with shareholders receiving warrants for New Media stock.

Kirk Davis is chief executive officer of GateHouse New England. Mark Olivieri is the publisher of The Patriot Ledger and The Enterprise and Lisa Strattan is the editor.

The Enterprise moved from its longtime editorial and business office at 60 Main St. to 1324 Belmont St. in 2008.

The New England Newspaper Association named The Enterprise as its Newspaper of the Year for 2007 among papers with daily circulations of 22,500 to 35,500. The Enterprise received the same honor for 2006 from the New England Press Association.

== Prices ==
The Enterprise prices are: $2.00 daily, $4.00 Sunday.
