= Waltham News Tribune =

Newspaper published in Massachusetts, US

- Type: Daily newspaper
- Format: Broadsheet
- Owner: Gannett
- Publisher: Kirk A. Davis
- Editor-in-chief: Richard K. Lodge
- Editor: Brad Spiegel
- Founded: 1863, as Waltham News Tribune
- Ceased publication: August 31, 2010 (ceased to publish daily); May 5, 2022 (ceased print publication)
- Headquarters: 738A Main Street, Waltham, Massachusetts 02451; United States
- Circulation: 4,931 daily in 2007
- Website: dailynewstribune.com

The Waltham News Tribune was a weekly newspaper in Massachusetts. Before 2010, it was a daily newspaper called The Daily News Tribune (before then, the News-Tribune and the Waltham Evening News). Before going weekly, it was an afternoon daily newspaper in Waltham, Massachusetts, covering that city and the neighboring city of Newton.

In its last years, the Tribune was managed and printed by The MetroWest Daily News, and owned by Community Newspaper Company, a division of GateHouse Media (later Gannett). In 2010, the Tribune printed its last daily edition, and was replaced by a weekly newspaper called the Waltham News Tribune. This new weekly newspaper was itself closed down in 2022.

== History ==
By 1980, the News-Tribune was part of a five-paper chain, Transcript Newspapers Inc., that included the Daily Transcript of Dedham and three weekly newspapers in West Roxbury-Roslindale (neighborhoods of Boston), Newton and Needham (suburbs west of Boston).

Between August 1984 and March 1986, the company was sold four times: to Gillett Communications in 1984; then to Thomson Newspapers that December; in April 1985 to William Dean Singleton (head of MediaNews Group)—and eventually, in 1986, to Harte-Hanks, which combined it with the Middlesex News to form News-Transcript Group.

News-Transcript, a chain of three dailies and several weekly newspapers stretching from Boston west to Framingham, Massachusetts, remained a Harte-Hanks property until 1994, when the company continued its divestment of print properties by selling the Massachusetts papers to Fidelity Investments' Community Newspaper Company, already the publisher of dozens of weeklies in the Boston suburbs.

A 1999 fire destroyed the News-Tribune office at 99 Moody Street, Waltham, but the paper continued to publish, initially settling in CNC's Needham headquarters before returning to a new office in Waltham.

CNC changed the newspaper's name, in 1999, to The Daily News Tribune, to emphasize the paper's connections its sister papers.

In 2000, Fidelity sold CNC to the publisher of the Boston Herald. The new owner instituted a content-sharing arrangement between CNC and the Herald, resulting in a regular stream of Daily News stories appearing in the Boston newspaper.

That arrangement continued for a time after the Herald sold CNC to Liberty Group Publishing (later renamed GateHouse Media) in 2006.

After converting The Daily News Transcript to a weekly newspaper in 2009, GateHouse made a similar move with its Waltham property in August 2010, adopting a semiweekly printing schedule for the renamed Waltham News Tribune, and focusing that paper's coverage on its home city. GateHouse continued to cover Newton via the Newton Tab, a weekly newspaper that CNC had owned since 1992.

One year later, in July 2011, the Waltham News Tribune printed its final Tuesday edition, converting to once-a-week publication on Fridays.

In 2019, the newspaper's owner, GateHouse Media, merged with Gannett, with the new combined entity taking the Gannett name.

In 2022, the Waltham News Tribune printed its last edition.

In 2024, a new nonprofit online news outlet called The Waltham Times was started by a group of local residents.
