= Blackstone Valley Tribune =

Weekly newspaper

- Type: Weekly newspaper
- Format: Broadsheet
- Owner: Stonebridge Press
- Editor: Brendan Berube
- Founded: 1983
- Headquarters: Northbridge, Massachusetts
- Website: website

The Blackstone Valley Tribune is a weekly newspaper in the towns of Northbridge, Douglas, and Uxbridge, Massachusetts.

The Blackstone Valley Tribune was established in May 1983. The Blackstone Valley News Tribune/Advertiser was established in the 1950s by Warren Roundy.
