= Sampan (newspaper) =

Bilingual Chinese and English newspaper

- Type: Nonprofit
- Owner(s): Asian American Civic Association
- Founded: 1972
- Headquarters: Boston, Massachusetts
- Website: www.sampan.org

Sampan is a newspaper based in Chinatown in Boston, Massachusetts. It is New England's only bilingual Chinese and English newspaper. The newspaper was founded in 1972 by volunteers of the Asian American Civic Association, then known as the Chinese American Civic Association; its slogan is "the only bilingual Chinese-English newspaper in New England." It is distributed throughout Greater Boston and covers news of Boston's Chinatown as well as the Greater Boston Asian American community.

A sampan is a flat-bottomed wooden boat, still used today in parts of Southeast Asia for fishing, transportation or even habitation. It is a metaphor, which symbolizes that this newspaper would bring news of the Chinese community, in both Chinese and English, around the city of Boston, providing a means to acquire information about the community to non-English speakers as well as non-Chinese speakers.

Sampan primarily reports on the news of Chinatown and Asian Americans of Greater Boston. As a free, nonprofit newspaper, Sampan makes its revenue almost entirely by advertisements.
