= News-Transcript Group =

Former newspaper publisher

- Industry: Newspapers
- Founded: 1986
- Defunct: 1996
- Fate: Bought, then dissolved
- Successor: Community Newspaper Company
- Headquarters: 33 New York Avenue, Framingham, Massachusetts 01701 United States
- Key people: Asa Cole, group publisher
- Products: Middlesex News, two other dailies, and 11 weekly newspapers
- Number of employees: 1994: 460
- Parent: Harte-Hanks, 1985-1995; Fidelity Investments, 1995-1996

News-Transcript Group, based in Framingham, Massachusetts, United States, was a newspaper publisher in eastern Massachusetts, overseeing three daily newspapers and several weekly newspapers before being bought by Fidelity Investments in 1995 and dissolved into Community Newspaper Company the next year.

== History ==
The group was formed in 1986 when Harte-Hanks bought Transcript Newspapers Inc. of Dedham, Massachusetts, merging it with the Middlesex News. Later that year, Harte-Hanks bought Century Newspapers and combined its operations with News-Transcript. In the mid-1990s, as Harte-Hanks divested its newspaper holdings, the company announced in 1994 that it would sell the 14-newspaper chain to Fidelity Investments.

The purchase price was not disclosed, but was estimated at US$30 million to US$40 million. When the sale was complete in 1995, Fidelity made News-Transcript a division of Community Newspaper Company, which became the second-largest circulation publisher in Massachusetts, with 766,000 weekly copies.

News-Transcript—known within CNC as Middlesex Community Newspapers—was dissolved in early 1996, when CNC realigned its operating units by geography, assigning the News-Transcript papers to new Metro, Northwest and West units.

=== Northeast Group ===
Harte-Hanks bought the Middlesex News in 1972, establishing its "Northeast Group" of newspapers, which included three Town Crier weeklies in towns neighboring the News' core coverage area of Framingham and Natick, Massachusetts. The News, a 40,000-circulation daily, gave Harte-Hanks—and later CNC—a mid-sized daily newspaper to serve as a flagship for scattered weeklies and smaller dailies.

Northeast Group added the 79-year-old Wellesley Townsman October 1, 1985, bought from owner Robert Linnell. The purchase was part of a push into the affluent suburb by the Middlesex News, which also debuted a new edition of the daily paper there.

=== Transcript Newspapers Inc. ===
The publisher of two smaller daily newspapers, Transcript Newspapers Inc. was owned for years by Wisconsin publisher Post Corporation. The papers' typesetters organized a long and at times violent strike in 1980, alleging unfair labor practices. Eleven reporters and editors at the Waltham paper were fired for refusing to cross a picket line; in all, about 60 Transcript employees were laid off for striking.

Between August 1984 and March 1986, the company was sold four times: to Gillett Communications in 1984; then to Thomson Newspapers that December; in April 1985 to William Dean Singleton (head of MediaNews Group)—and eventually, in 1986, to Harte-Hanks.

=== Century Newspapers ===
Harte-Hanks' purchase of Century Newspapers in mid-1986 added six weeklies to News-Transcript Group, in suburbs north and west of Boston. Two of the newspapers remain part of Community Newspaper Company today: The Arlington Advocate and The Winchester Star.

By the time Fidelity bought the newspapers, the Belmont Citizen and Belmont Herald had merged, the Watertown Sun had closed, and the Newton Transcript had merged with Northeast Group's Newton Graphic.

The merger of the two Belmont papers was controversial. They had competed for 50 years when Century, publisher of the Citizen, bought the less newsy Herald from publisher John Martin Jr. in early 1986. The Herald's editor, Robert Mead, urged Belmont residents to boycott his former paper, as the two "competitors" began collaborating their coverage and sharing staff, although initially they continued to publish separate editions.

== Properties ==
At the time of its sale to CNC, News-Transcript Group consisted of three daily and 11 weekly newspapers, all in Massachusetts (the papers' owners before 1986 are listed in parentheses):

- Daily Transcript of Dedham (flagship of Transcript Newspapers)
- Middlesex News (daily) of Framingham (flagship of Harte-Hanks' Northeast Group)
- News-Tribune (daily) of Waltham (Transcript)
- The Arlington Advocate of Arlington (Century Newspapers)
- Belmont Citizen-Herald of Belmont (Century; was two papers)
- Needham Chronicle of Needham (Transcript)
- The Newton Graphic of Newton (Century and Transcript; was two papers)
- Parkway Transcript of Roslindale, in Boston (Transcript)
- Sudbury Town Crier of Sudbury (Northeast Group)
- Wayland Town Crier of Wayland (Northeast Group)
- Wellesley Townsman of Wellesley (Northeast Group)
- West Roxbury Transcript of West Roxbury, in Boston (Transcript)
- Weston Town Crier of Weston (Northeast Group)
- The Winchester Star of Winchester (flagship of Century Newspapers)

All of these newspapers except the Newton Graphic and Needham Chronicle are still published by Community Newspaper Company, now a division of GateHouse Media, although the dailies' and Roslindale paper's names have changed. The Newton paper (itself the product of a merger) was merged with CNC's Newton Tab after the News-Transcript sale.
