= The Somerville Times =

American newspaper

- Type: Weekly newspaper
- Owner: Prospect Hill Publishing Corp.
- Founded: 1969
- Headquarters: Somerville, Massachusetts 02144, United States
- Website: thesomervilletimes.com

The Somerville Times is a newspaper headquartered in Somerville, Massachusetts, covering local news, sports, business, politics and community events.

Established in 1969, it was owned by Prospect Hill Publishing Corp until 2014, at which point ownership transferred to Ross Blouin.
