= Enterprise-Sun =

Daily newspapers in Marlborough and Hudson, Massachusetts, U.S.

- Type: Daily newspaper
- Format: Broadsheet
- Owner: Community Newspaper Company
- Publisher: Asa Cole
- Editor: Jon Towne
- Founded: September 4, 1889, as Daily Enterprise
- Ceased publication: September 14, 1995 (converted to weeklies)
- Headquarters: 230 Maple Street, Marlborough, Massachusetts 01752, United States
- Circulation: 6,000 in 1995
- OCLC number: 34945395

The Enterprise-Sun, and its predecessors, the Hudson Daily Sun and Marlboro Enterprise, were daily newspapers covering the city of Marlborough and adjoining town of Hudson, both in Middlesex County, Massachusetts.

The combined paper ended in 1995, replaced by two weekly newspapers—the Marlborough Enterprise and Hudson Sun—and the west edition of The MetroWest Daily News, all of which are owned by Community Newspaper Company, now part of GateHouse Media.

== History ==
Thomas Hayden began publishing the Daily Enterprise in 1889, one year after beginning it as a weekly. Across the town line, the Hudson Daily Sun was founded by William H. Murphy in 1902. The Marlborough paper went through minor name changes, adding and dropping the words "Marlboro" and "Daily" in its name, in its century of publication.

Enterprise owners Dustin Lucier and Charles H. Toby bought the Daily Sun in 1922, but the combined Marlborough newsroom continued to publish two separate newspapers until 1993. Grace Mada Lucier, Dustin's widow, sold the paper to the rival Worcester Telegram in 1969.

In 1984, the papers were transferred to Beacon Communications Corporation, a chain of a dozen weekly newspapers in western Middlesex County, which was purchased that year by the family-owned Telegram. In 1986, control passed to out-of-state interests for the first time, as the Telegram was sold to Chronicle Publishing Company of San Francisco, California.

In 1993, Chronicle, looking to concentrate on Worcester County, dealt the Beacon papers to Community Newspaper Company, which would soon become publisher of the dailies' most direct competitor, the Middlesex News (later to be renamed The MetroWest Daily News).

== Demise ==
Throughout the early 1990s, the Enterprise and Sun reinvented themselves in an effort to turn around declining revenues.

Up to the 1980s, both papers came out in the afternoon on weekdays; by then, they were also printing Saturday morning editions. Under the Telegram's ownership, Marlborough and Hudson converted to all-morning publication July 9, 1990, echoing the Telegram's closure of its Evening Gazette sister paper in 1986. At the time, the papers' editor said the move reflected changing reader demographics and would allow for better coverage of state and business news.

Shortly after being acquired by CNC, the papers were merged into a single Enterprise-Sun in 1993. Later that year, only three years after touting increased space for state news, the paper's new editor dropped the Associated Press wire and began touting "All Local News" as a way to differentiate the Enterprise-Sun from its competitors.

Despite these efforts, CNC closed the Enterprise-Sun in September 1995, reassigning its staff to the Middlesex News and the new weeklies. Today the daily newspapers' names survive on the nameplates of weeklies published from CNC's Marlborough office, but most Marlborough and Hudson crime and political news appears first in The MetroWest Daily News, which shares an office and some staff with the weeklies, and publishes a separate edition for the Marlborough area.
