= The Wayland Town Crier =

Weekly local newspaper in Wayland, Massachusetts

- Type: Weekly newspaper
- Format: Broadsheet
- Owner: USA Today Co.
- Publisher: Wicked Local
- Editor: Anne Brennan (editor in chief), Michael Wyner and Rick Rendell
- Founded: October 1951
- Headquarters: Wayland, Middlesex County, Massachusetts, USA
- Circulation: 2,362 copies (estimate)
- ISSN: 1096-262X
- OCLC number: 22945549
- Website: wayland.wickedlocal.com;

The Wayland Town Crier is a paid weekly, local newspaper in Wayland, Massachusetts. It is currently owned by USA Today Co. and operated underneath the Wicked Local branch.

== History ==
The earliest found issue of the Crier is Vol. 6, No. 1 from October 1951.

The paper was published monthly until 1955, mainly discussing news of the town and the surrounding areas. Following the final publication of Vol. 9, the paper began publishing weekly, starting with Vol. 10, No. 1 on September 29, 1955. Since this date, the Crier has published between 51 and 53 newspapers every year. All publications are released on Thursdays.
