= Taunton Daily Gazette =

Newspaper in Taunton, Massachusetts

- Type: Daily newspaper
- Format: Broadsheet
- Owner: USA Today Co.
- Publisher: Mark Olivieri
- Editor: Rebecca Hyman
- Founded: June 10, 1848
- Headquarters: 5 Cohannet Street, Taunton, Massachusetts 02780, United States
- Circulation: 6,703 Daily; 7,185 Sunday (as of 2012)
- OCLC number: 9545291
- Website: tauntongazette.com

The Taunton Daily Gazette (and Taunton Sunday Gazette) is a daily newspaper founded in 1848. Based in Taunton, Massachusetts, its coverage area also includes Berkley, Rehoboth, Dighton, Lakeville, Norton, and Raynham. It is owned by USA Today Co.

== See also ==
- Bristol County, Massachusetts
- Greater Taunton Area
- Taunton Call
- List of newspapers in Massachusetts
