= North Shore Weeklies =

North Shore Weeklies Inc.
- Industry: Newspapers
- Founded: 1958
- Defunct: 1996
- Fate: Bought, then dissolved
- Successor: Community Newspaper Company
- Headquarters: 2 Washington Street, Ipswich, Massachusetts 01938; United States
- Key people: William S. Wasserman Jr., founder
- Products: Several weekly newspapers
- Number of employees: 1986: 180
- Parent: Wasserman, 1958–1986; Fidelity Investments, 1986–1996

North Shore Weeklies Inc., based in Ipswich, Massachusetts, United States, was a newspaper publisher on Massachusetts' North Shore and one of the original subsidiaries of Community Newspaper Company (CNC), now the largest publisher of weeklies in Massachusetts.

William S. Wasserman Jr. founded the company in 1958, running it independently until selling in 1986 to a group underwritten by Fidelity Investments, which founded CNC. North Shore Weeklies was dissolved in 1996; most of its newspapers are still part of CNC, now a division of GateHouse Media.

== Wasserman ==
Under Wasserman, who began the company with his purchase of the Amesbury News in 1958, the company gradually expanded until it included nine weekly newspapers down the seacoast toward Boston. In the 12 months ending August 31, 1986, the company made US$7.6 million in revenues and turned a profit.

After selling the papers, Wasserman gave US$700,000 out of the proceeds in bonuses to his staff, distributed based on how long they had worked for the company. Some employees were given as much as US$20,000.

But Wasserman could be a severe businessman, too. For 2½ years in the 1980s, he competed for readers in two North Shore towns with former employee Joseph Fenton, who bought an independent newspaper in Ipswich—home of North Shore Weeklies' main offices, at the time—in 1981. A year later, Fenton started a new paper in Georgetown, and Wasserman responded by following him there, with the Georgetown Record. Both publishers said they were being unfairly targeted by the other.

In 1983, Wasserman emerged the winner of the "Georgetown Newspaper War", purchasing Fenton's Ipswich Today and Georgetown Weekly.

== Fidelity ==
Robert I. Owens, a local politician who was related by marriage to the Harte side of Harte-Hanks, convinced Fidelity to help finance his purchase of North Shore Weeklies in 1986. He later sold his share to Fidelity's Community Newspaper Company.

In 1992, North Shore bought the Lynn Sunday Post, a 6,100-circulation weekly it had printed for the past 15 years. The Sunday Post had been founded in Lynn in 1960.

The company debuted another weekly newspaper, the Beverly Citizen, in 1995, after Ottaway Community Newspapers merged The Beverly Times into The Salem Evening News, leaving Beverly without an in-town newspaper.

North Shore Weeklies was dissolved in early 1996, when CNC realigned its operating units by geography, assigning the North Shore papers, along with others, to new North Unit.

== Properties ==
At the time of its sale to Fidelity in 1986, North Shore Weeklies consisted of nine weekly newspapers, all in Essex County, Massachusetts:

- Amesbury News of Amesbury
- Danvers Herald of Danvers
- Georgetown Record of Georgetown
- Hamilton-Wenham Chronicle of Hamilton and Wenham
- Ipswich Chronicle of Ipswich
- Marblehead Reporter of Marblehead
- North Shore Sunday of Peabody
- Swampscott Reporter of Swampscott
- Tri-Town Transcript of Boxford, Middleton and Topsfield

All of the above newspapers became part of CNC's North Unit, along with several other newspapers along and inland from the North Shore, including papers such as the Saugus Advertiser, which North Shore Weeklies purchased as a CNC subsidiary in 1991.
