= Memorial Press Group =

- Industry: Newspapers
- Founded: 1822, as Old Colony Memorial
- Defunct: October 1, 2006
- Fate: Bought, then dissolved
- Successor: Community Newspaper Company
- Headquarters: 9 Long Pond Road, Plymouth, Massachusetts 02360; United States
- Products: Several weekly newspapers along the Massachusetts South Shore
- Number of employees: 2004: 135
- Parent: Prescott Publishing, 1979-1998; Enterprise NewsMedia, 1998-2006; GateHouse Media, 2006

Memorial Press Group, based in Plymouth, Massachusetts, United States, was a chain of weekly newspapers along the South Shore near Boston, Massachusetts. Long owned by The Patriot Ledger in nearby Quincy, MPG and its daily parent were sold to GateHouse Media in 2006.

Today, several former MPG papers still publish as part of Community Newspaper Company, purchased by GateHouse at the same time. Many of the others were folded into former competitors published by CNC.

== History ==
The Old Colony Memorial, which claims the title of oldest weekly newspaper in New England, was founded in 1822 in Plymouth, Massachusetts. The Memorial had become the flagship of a nine-paper chain stretching from Plymouth north to the Boston suburbs by the turn of the 21st century.

=== Dailies ===
K. Prescott Low, whose family had published The Patriot Ledger for a century, purchased MPG in 1979 and incorporated it into the privately owned George W. Prescott Publishing Company. Thirty years later, however, in 1997, Low found that "mega-players competing with us" made family ownership of the Ledger and MPG uneconomic, and sought to sell them.

A buyer quickly emerged: James F. Plugh, owner of The Enterprise, the Brockton daily newspaper that competed with the Ledger and several MPG papers. Plugh's Newspaper Media LLC, later renamed Enterprise NewsMedia, bought the Prescott Publishing for an estimated US$60 to US$70 million.

Toward the end of Plugh's ownership of MPG, the company began expanding. In 2005, MPG purchased the Call Group of three weeklies in the Taunton area, as well as the Norwood Bulletin. A year later, Plugh purchased Associated and Independent Newspapers, an independent chain of 12 weeklies in the suburbs around Brockton.

=== GateHouse ===
Liberty Publishing purchased Enterprise NewsMedia in 2006 as part of a mammoth deal that also included Community Newspaper Company—then owned by the Boston Herald—and a new name for the parent company, GateHouse Media.

Under GateHouse, MPG was gradually folded into CNC's South Unit. In a reorganization announced October 1, 2006, MPG's executives were reassigned to CNC positions and a handful of newspapers were closed to eliminate competition within the merged company. Additionally, MPG papers that had been printed in tabloid format became broadsheets and would now be printed at CNC presses.

== Properties ==
At the time of its incorporation into CNC in 2006, Mariner Group consisted of the following weeklies:

- Avon Messenger of Avon (part of Associated)discontinued in 2008.
- Bridgewater Independent of Bridgewater (part of Associated)
- Carver Reporter of Carver
- Duxbury Reporter of Duxbury (Discontinued December 2013)
- East Bridgewater Star of East Bridgewater (part of Associated)
- Easton Bulletin of Easton (part of Associated; folded into Easton Journal in 2006)
- Halifax-Plympton Reporter of Halifax and Plympton (Discontinued December 2013)
- Hanson Town Crier of Hanson (part of Associated)
- Kingston Reporter of Kingston
- The Lakeville Call of Lakeville (part of Call Group)
- Marshfield Reporter of Marshfield (folded into Marshfield Mariner in 2006)
- Norwood Bulletin of Norwood (bought in 2005)
- Old Colony Memorial of Plymouth (twice-weekly)
- Pembroke Reporter of Pembroke (merged with rival in 2006 to form Pembroke Mariner & Reporter)
- Randolph Herald of Randolph (part of Associated)
- The Raynham Call of Raynham (part of Call Group)
- Rockland Standard of Rockland (part of Associated)
- The Sentinel of Marion and Rochester
- Stoughton Chronicle of Stoughton (part of Associated; folded into Stoughton Journal in 2006)
- The Taunton Call of Taunton (part of Call Group)
- Wareham Courier of Wareham
- West Bridgewater Times of West Bridgewater (part of Associated)
- Whitman Times of Whitman (part of Associated)

Except where noted, these titles are still published by CNC. The papers marked "Associated" were added to MPG in 2006 after its purchase of Associated and Independent Newspapers. The "Call Group" papers were purchased in 2005.
