= Revere Journal =

Newspaper in Massachusetts, US

- Type: Weekly newspaper
- Owner: The Independent Newspaper Group
- Founded: 1881
- Language: English
- Headquarters: 385 Broadway, Suite 105 in the Citizens Bank Building, Revere, MA 02151
- Website: reverejournal.com

The Revere Journal is the local newspaper for Revere, Massachusetts, United States.

== History ==
The newspaper was founded in 1881 with E. H. Pierce as editor, and originally was published as an eight-page publication on Saturdays, with an initial circulation of 2,500. It is currently published online at reverejournal.com.
