= Winthrop Sun Transcript =

Weekly newspaper in Massachusetts, US

- Type: Weekly newspaper
- Format: Broadsheet
- Owner: Independent Newspaper Group
- Publisher: Sun Transcript Inc.
- Editor: Cary Shuman
- Founded: 1959
- Headquarters: Winthrop, Massachusetts
- Circulation: 4,300
- OCLC number: 23071194
- Website: winthroptranscript.com

The Winthrop Sun Transcript is the weekly newspaper for the town of Winthrop, Massachusetts. The paper is the product of the merger of the Sun and the Winthrop Transcript in 1959. The Winthrop Sun was in turn the product of a series of mergers of local papers the Winthrop Review (1919-1944), the early Sun (1892-1905), and the Winthrop Visitor (1885-1905). It is distributed every Thursday morning, and has a circulation of 4,300 copies. It is owned by Independent Newspaper Group, and edited by Cary Shuman.
