= The Westfield News =

Daily newspaper in Westfield, Massachusetts, U.S.

- Type: Daily newspaper
- Owner(s): The Westfield News Group, LLC (?–2019); Reminders Publishing, LLC (2019–Present)
- Publisher: Patrick R. Berry (2011–2019); G. Michael Dobbs (2019–Present)
- Headquarters: 181 Root Rd, Westfield, Massachusetts 01085; United States
- Circulation: 4,500 daily (as of 2011)
- Website: masslive.com/westfieldnews

The Westfield News is a daily newspaper published Monday through Saturday mornings in Westfield, Massachusetts, United States, covering "Westfield, Southwick and the Hill Towns" of western Hampden County, Massachusetts.

The newspaper was purchased by Westfield native Patrick Berry in June 2011 from Allbritton Communications Company. Its circulation at the time was 4,500 daily.

Upon purchasing the newspaper, Berry introduced color printing for the first time—by retiring the News' 1971 press and printing instead at The Republican in Springfield—and changed the paper's name from The Westfield Evening News in order to emphasize the all-day nature of the news cycle. He promised a new website and emphasis on social media such as Twitter and Facebook.

A web site, thewestfieldnews.com, was launched on June 4, 2012. It was retired in 2021 and articles from the print edition now appear on MassLive.com.

The newspaper was previously owned by Allbritton Communications, based in Washington, D.C.; it was the last traditional newspaper holding for the former Washington Star Company.

Westfield News Group also formerly published The Pennysaver in western Massachusetts and northern Connecticut and two weekly newspapers in the Westfield area, the Longmeadow News in Longmeadow, Massachusetts, and the Enfield Press in Enfield, Connecticut.

In July 2019, The Westfield News was purchased by Reminders Publishing, LLC (a subsidiary of The Republican). Reminders Publishing continues to publish The Westfield News and The Pennysaver, but closed the Longmeadow and Enfield papers.
