= Bay State Newspaper Company =

American weekly newspaper publisher

Bay State Newspaper Co.
- Industry: Newspapers
- Founded: May 1, 1991
- Defunct: January 11, 1996
- Fate: Dissolved into parent
- Successor: Community Newspaper Company
- Headquarters: Somerville, Massachusetts; United States
- Key people: William P. Dole, former owner Donald Morse, publisher
- Products: Weekly newspapers in three cities north of Boston
- Parent: Fidelity Investments

Bay State Newspaper Company, based in Somerville, Massachusetts, United States, was a publisher of weekly newspapers in suburbs north of Boston. It was formed in 1991 by Fidelity Investments after it bought Dole Publishing from its longtime owner, William P. Dole.

Bay State Newspaper was folded into the Metro Unit of Fidelity's Community Newspaper Company in 1996. CNC is now owned by GateHouse Media.

Bay State's properties were assembled by the Dole family, which ran the Cambridge Chronicle from the 1930s to early 1990s. The Chronicle, newspaper of record for the city of Cambridge, has published since 1846 and, under the Doles, was combined with the rival Cambridge Sun.

The Doles also acquired the main weeklies in two other suburban cities north of Boston, as well as printing other publications (such as shoppers).

== Properties ==
At the time of its sale to Fidelity in 1991, Dole Publishing (renamed Bay State Newspaper Co.) consisted of three weeklies, all in Middlesex County, Massachusetts and also the Merrimack Valley Advertiser which published in Tewksbury, Wilmington, Billerica, Chelmsford, and part of Westford.:

- Cambridge Chronicle of Cambridge (founded 1846)
- Somerville Journal of Somerville
- Watertown Press of Watertown

All of these papers still publish as part of CNC's Metro Unit. Bay State also published a shopper serving the Lowell area, called the Merrimack Valley Advertiser. That publication was later converted to two Advertiser weeklies in Tewksbury and Wilmington, now published by CNC's Northwest Unit as The Tewksbury Advocate and The Wilmington Advocate.
