= The Daily News Transcript =

Afternoon daily newspaper in Norwood, Massachusetts, U.S.

- Type: Daily newspaper
- Format: Broadsheet
- Owner: GateHouse Media
- Publisher: Kirk A. Davis
- Editor: Richard K. Lodge
- Founded: 1870, as Dedham Transcript
- Ceased publication: September 25, 2009
- Headquarters: 1091 Washington Street, Norwood, Massachusetts 02062 United States
- Circulation: 3,947 Daily (as of 2007)
- Price: US$0.50 daily
- Website: dailynewstranscript.com

The Daily News Transcript (formerly known as the Dedham Transcript and the Neponset Valley Daily News) was a five-day (Monday through Friday) afternoon daily newspaper in Norwood, Massachusetts, U.S., covering the Neponset Valley of Norfolk County, Massachusetts. The Transcript was originally published in Dedham, and also covered Walpole and Westwood.

In its final years, the Transcript was managed and printed by The MetroWest Daily News. Both were owned by Community Newspaper Company, a division of GateHouse Media.

== History ==
In the mid-1800s, the Transcript was published by John Cox, Jr., and edited by Samuel H. Cox. (Note: John Cox lived on Church Street.)

By 1980, the Transcript—then called the Daily Transcript—was the flagship of a five-paper chain, Transcript Newspapers Inc., that included the News-Tribune of Waltham and three weekly newspapers in West Roxbury-Roslindale (neighborhoods of Boston), Newton and Needham (suburbs west of Boston).

Between August 1984 and March 1986, the company was sold four times: to Gillett Communications in 1984; then to Thomson Newspapers that December; in April 1985 to William Dean Singleton (head of MediaNews Group)—and eventually, in 1986, to Harte-Hanks, which combined it with the Middlesex News to form News-Transcript Group.

News-Transcript, a chain of three dailies and several weekly newspapers stretching from Boston west to Framingham, Massachusetts, remained a Harte-Hanks property until 1994, when the company continued its divestment of print properties by selling the Massachusetts papers to Fidelity Investments' Community Newspaper Company, already the publisher of dozens of weeklies in the Boston suburbs.

CNC changed the newspaper's name, in 1999, to Neponset Valley Daily News, to emphasize the paper's connections with its home region and its sister papers. This name was changed again shortly after, to Daily News Transcript.

In 2000, Fidelity sold CNC to the publisher of the Boston Herald. The new owner instituted a content-sharing arrangement between CNC and the Herald, resulting in a regular stream of Daily News stories appearing in the Boston newspaper.

That arrangement continued even after the Herald sold CNC to Liberty Group Publishing (later renamed GateHouse Media) in 2006.

On August 20, 2009, GateHouse Media announced the Daily News Transcript would be ending publication in October 2009. The company plans to continue to cover the towns in the Transcript's coverage area with weekly papers, including a new one called the Dedham Transcript.

The last edition of the Daily News Transcript was published on September 25, 2009. After being merged with the Norwood Bulletin, it is now published as the Transcript and Bulletin.
