= MetroWest =

Region west of Boston and east of Worcester, in the U.S. state of Massachusetts

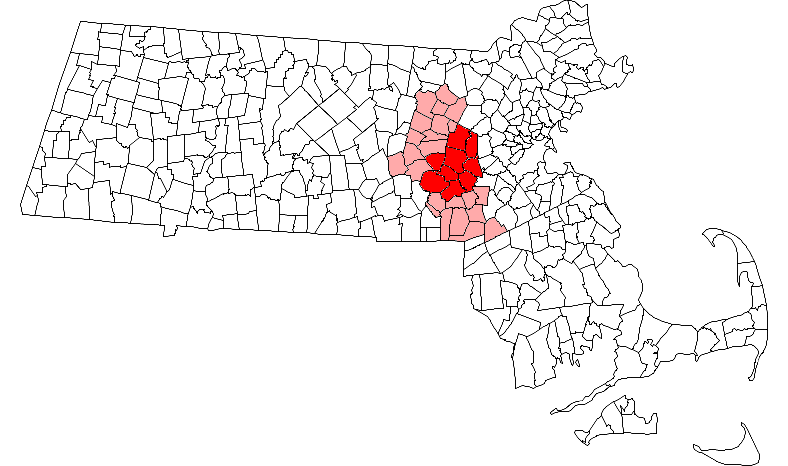
Map of Massachusetts with MetroWest highlighted: Nine towns included by MWERC in red, 23 additional communities in 495/MetroWest Corridor in pink.

MetroWest is a cluster of cities and towns lying west of Boston and east of Worcester, in the Commonwealth of Massachusetts. The name was coined in the 1980s by a local newspaper.

== Geography ==
While regional definitions vary, the MetroWest Economic Research Center at Framingham State University defines MetroWest as the nine communities of Ashland, Framingham, Holliston, Hopkinton, Natick, Sherborn, Southborough, Sudbury, and Wayland, representing a total population of approximately 209,682. With the exception of Southborough, in Worcester County, these towns are part of Middlesex County.

The MetroWest Chamber of Commerce has a service area that includes these nine towns plus Westborough.

The 495/MetroWest Corridor Partnership calls the region the "Arc of Innovation" because it is and has been home to many of Massachusetts' largest and fastest growing companies since the 1970s. In addition to the nine towns mentioned above, 26 other municipalities in Middlesex, Norfolk and Worcester counties are included in the 495/MetroWest area as defined by the 495/MetroWest Partnership:

- Acton
- Ashland
- Bellingham
- Berlin
- Bolton
- Boxborough
- Grafton
- Foxborough
- Framingham
- Franklin
- Harvard
- Holliston
- Hopedale
- Hopkinton
- Hudson
- Littleton
- Marlborough
- Maynard
- Medfield
- Medway
- Milford
- Millis
- Natick
- Norfolk
- Northborough
- Sherborn
- Shrewsbury
- Southborough
- Stow
- Sudbury
- Upton
- Wayland
- Westborough
- Westford
- Wrentham

The Metropolitan Area Planning Council (MAPC) divides the Boston metropolitan area into eight subregions, each with a planning committee. The MetroWest Regional Collaborative (MWRC) works with nine cities and towns: Ashland, Framingham, Holliston, Marlborough, Natick, Southborough, Wayland, Wellesley, and Weston. This list overlaps, but is not identical, to the other lists.

The MetroWest Daily News indicates its service area by listing 14 communities at the bottom of its web site: Ashland, Framingham, Holliston, Hopkinton, Hudson, Marlborough, Natick, Northborough, Shrewsbury, Southborough, Sudbury, Wayland, Westborough, and Weston. Again, this list overlaps but is not identical to any of the other lists.

Yellow Book's MetroWest edition defines MetroWest as all cities and towns completely or partially enclosed by Interstate 93 on the northeast, Interstate 495 on the north and west, and Interstate 95 on the east and south, stretching as far north as Westford and Chelmsford, and as far northeast as Wilmington.

== Origin and acceptance ==
The MetroWest Daily News, based in Framingham (MetroWest's most populous town), circulates in most of the towns in MetroWest. The newspaper, formerly called the Middlesex News, South Middlesex News, and Framingham Evening News, held a contest to name its coverage area in 1983; MetroWest, reporter Greg Supernovich's suggestion, beat out competitors such as "Databelt" (a nod to the region's high-tech industry). The newspaper incorporated the regional name into its own name in 1999.

Supernovich said he chose the name, MetroWest, for a number of reasons. One of those was geography. Both the North Shore and South Shore around Boston were lasting names, so he concluded, after studying a Boston map, that the name had to include the word, "West," since the region's towns were west of Boston. Also, he said he was the health/environmental reporter at the newspaper at the time, and his job affected his values. He thought of the American West as wild and natural, and hoped that the area west of Boston would maintain its natural heritage of some open space, conservation areas, river corridors, wildlife habitats, and clean air and water, a model that would create a safe and healthy place for its residents. Yes, he said, he understood the importance of business and commerce as the major contributors of jobs and economic vitality to the region, but he hoped they would pursue their interests with social responsibility to protect people's health and the environment. As for "Metro", he said it was clear at the time he chose the name that the cities and towns west of Boston would continue to grow as part of a metropolitan Boston area. Lastly, he noted that he liked the sound of "MetroWest", and its modern look of combining two words to create a new word/concept. (Supernovich, 2014)

Originally, "MetroWest" was newspaper and real estate agent shorthand for "Framingham-Natick area", but a 1998 article in The Boston Globe showed, by examining the local phonebook, how accepted the term had become in less than ten years:

In the 1998 edition, there are 88 [listings], from Metro West Christian Academy in Ashland to Metrowest Urology in Natick, including such big names as Metrowest Bank, MetroWest Medical Center and the Metrowest Economic Research Center at Framingham State College. On Beacon Hill, there is a Metrowest Legislative Caucus.

By 2006, the name had gained such widespread acceptance in Massachusetts—and was so synonymous with prosperous businesses—that the airport commission in Worcester, a half-hour drive west of Framingham, suggested changing the name of the city's airport from Worcester Regional Airport to "Worcester-MetroWest-Boston Airport".

The MetroWest Regional Transit Authority was formed in 2006.

== Culture ==
The area is affluent and is home to many wealthy residents and families. The area is considered politically progressive where much of Massachusetts' liberal base is clustered.

== Others ==
In Western Massachusetts, The Republican newspaper in Springfield uses the term "Metro West" to designate the city's western suburbs (and "Metro East" on the other side of the city).

The designation "MetroWest" is also used by certain regions west of metropolitan areas in other states such as New Jersey, though the term does not appear to have achieved elsewhere the level of usage it has in Massachusetts.

It also refers to a neighborhood in a Orlando, Florida and to a project to improve the rail services in Bristol, England.
