= The Patriot Ledger =

American newspaper in Quincy, Massachusetts

- Type: Daily newspaper
- Format: Broadsheet
- Owner: USA Today Co.
- Publisher: Mark Oliveiri
- Editor: Lisa Strattan
- Founded: January 7, 1837, as Quincy Patriot
- Headquarters: 2 Adams Place; Quincy, Massachusetts 02269-9159, United States
- Circulation: 6,000 (as of 2022)
- OCLC number: 22448062
- Website: www.patriotledger.com

The Patriot Ledger is a daily newspaper in Quincy, Massachusetts, that serves the South Shore. It publishes Monday through Saturday.

== History ==
The paper was founded on 7 January 1837, as the weekly Quincy Patriot by John Adams Green and Edmund Butler Osborne.

The Quincy Patriot was the hometown paper of President John Quincy Adams, a frequent writer of letters to the editor after he left the White House and became a congressman.

The longest-running family ownership began in 1852 when George Washington Prescott went to work for the paper as a carrier. He later bought the newspaper. In 1890, Prescott started The Quincy Daily Ledger, continuing The Patriot as a weekly. In 1916, the weekly and daily were merged into The Quincy Patriot Ledger. The paper later expanded to serve communities throughout the South Shore.

In the 1950s, the paper became a pioneer in newspaper production. Early experimentation led to development of the first practical photo-typesetting machine. Newspaper executives from throughout the world visited the paper to learn about the new process.

The Patriot Ledger was also among the first papers in the nation to establish zoned editions for local news and advertising, exchanging journalists with foreign countries, transmitting news copy and page layouts by facsimile, using a front-end computer editing system, installing a two-way radio system for spot news coverage, pioneering the use of 35-millimeter photography and setting up a "little merchants" carrier system.

In 1979, G.W. Prescott Publishing Co. bought the Memorial Press Group and the Old Colony Memorial of Plymouth, Mass.

The Patriot Ledger moved from its longtime editorial and business office location in downtown Quincy to the Crown Colony Office Park in South Quincy in 1988, then moved to 2 Adams Place on the Quincy-Braintree line.

The newspaper was sold in 1997 to Newspaper Media LLC, which also owned The Enterprise in Brockton. It was bought by GateHouse Media in 2006.

In September 2013, an affiliate of the principal shareholder of GateHouse Media, Fortress Investment Group, purchased the Dow Jones Local Media Group. Among the eight daily and 25 weekly publications included in the sale were the Cape Cod Times, the Standard Times of New Bedford and the Portsmouth (N.H.) Herald. GateHouse managed all of those publications.

In November 2013, GateHouse emerged from Chapter 11 bankruptcy proceedings, less than two months after filing to restructure $1.2 billion of debt. In November 2019, GateHouse merged with the Gannett newspaper chain, publisher of USA Today and 100 other newspapers. Now operating under the Gannett name, the company owns more than 500 newspapers across 39 states, one of every six in the country. GateHouse CEO Mike Reed continued in that position with the combined companies.
