= The MetroWest Daily News =

Massachusetts newspaper

- Type: Daily newspaper
- Format: Broadsheet
- Owner: USA Today Co.
- Publisher: Lisa Strattan
- Editor: Anne Brennan
- Founded: 1897, as Framingham Evening News
- Headquarters: 1 Speen St., Framingham, Massachusetts 01701, United States
- Circulation: 6,769 (as of 2018)
- OCLC number: 40356496
- Website: metrowestdailynews.com

The MetroWest Daily News is an American daily newspaper published in Framingham, Massachusetts, serving the MetroWest region of suburban Boston. The newspaper is owned by USA Today Co.

The newspaper covers several cities and towns in Norfolk, Middlesex and Worcester counties. Until 1998 it was named for Middlesex County (most recently as the Middlesex News) or for the then-town of Framingham (through most of the mid-20th century, as the Framingham News).

== History ==
Originally a locally owned evening newspaper, the News was purchased by the Harte-Hanks newspaper chain as its first foray into Massachusetts journalism, in 1972.

By 1986, the paper sold 49,000 copies daily and 55,000 on Sunday, and also published four Framingham-area weekly newspapers: the Town Crier papers in Sudbury, Wayland and Weston, and the Townsman in Wellesley. That year, Harte-Hanks added the Daily Transcript of Dedham and the News-Tribune of Waltham, and 17 weeklies, to its holdings, and merged its Massachusetts properties into a single organization that became known as News-Transcript Group.

Around that time, amid a review of the four local newspaper companies competing in the Framingham area, The Boston Globe gave the paper credit for wide-ranging coverage of foreign, national, local, sports, arts and lifestyle news, but Tab Communications publisher Russell Pergament said his daily competition left a niche for his community papers:

There's an undercurrent of resentment toward the Middlesex News. People are not getting enough local news. Well, we're going to give them local news like they've never had it before -- we're going to out-News the News.

The News' weekly competitors were mostly bought out by Fidelity Investments in the early 1990s, and became sister papers in 1994, when Harte-Hanks decided to sell its newspapers and Fidelity's Community Newspaper Company announced it would buy the News-Transcript Group. Before purchasing News-Transcript, CNC's only daily was the News rival Enterprise-Sun of Marlborough. The News' daily circulation at the time was given as 35,516, and 45,174 on Sunday.

In 2000, after adding more weeklies to its fold, Fidelity sold CNC to the publisher of the Boston Herald. The new owner instituted a content-sharing arrangement between CNC and the Herald, resulting in a regular stream of Daily News stories appearing in the Boston newspaper.

That arrangement continued for a short while after the Herald sold CNC to Liberty Group Publishing (later renamed GateHouse Media) in 2006.

== Name ==
The current name is the sixth for the Daily News. Known at the start of 20th century as the Framingham Evening News, it became simply the Framingham News in 1926 and carried that moniker until 1971, when the South Middlesex Daily News was adopted. Six years later, that name was shortened to South Middlesex News, then in 1979 to Middlesex News, which remained its name until 1998.

The regional term MetroWest was promoted to the nameplate October 19, 1998, as a response to the dissolution of county government in Middlesex County, and a recognition of the newspaper's reach into Norfolk and Worcester counties. The name had been coined and adopted by the newspaper in the 1980s as a means of giving its circulation area more of a shared identity than earlier alternatives -- "Greater Framingham" (which many towns in the paper's northern coverage area, western Middlesex County, did not feel they belonged to) and "South Middlesex" (which excluded towns in other counties). Reporter Greg Supernovich suggested the name—for which he received dinner for two.

== Online ==
As befits a newspaper covering Massachusetts' high-tech corridor—an earlier alternative to "MetroWest" was "Databelt"—the Daily News was among the pioneers in electronic publishing.

Along with ten other members of the Associated Press, the Middlesex News in 1980 offered a digital text edition to CompuServe. The bulletin board service's subscribers could then, via dial-up, access News stories on their personal computers.

In 1987, the paper debuted its own BBS, called Fred the Computer. Subscribers could dial into Fred and see the next day's headlines, submit press releases and write letters to the editor. In 1993, the News set up a Gopher site, making it the first general-circulation United States newspaper on the Internet.

The online edition of The MetroWest Daily News was launched in September 2001. It shares templates and systems with other GateHouse New England properties' websites, at Wicked Local.
