= Community Newspaper Company =

Newspaper publishing company (1991–2011)

Community Newspaper Co.
- Company type: Division of publicly held company
- Industry: Publishing
- Founded: January 1991
- Defunct: 2011
- Headquarters: 254 Second Avenue, Needham, Massachusetts 02494, United States
- Area served: Eastern Massachusetts
- Products: Daily and weekly newspapers
- Parent: USA Today Co.
- Divisions: Cape, Metro, North, Northwest, South, West
- Website: WickedLocal.com

Community Newspaper Company, or CNC, was the largest publisher of weekly newspapers in eastern Massachusetts in the 1990s and first decade of the 21st century. It also published several daily newspapers in Greater Boston.

The company's properties were assembled by Fidelity Investments in the 1980s; Fidelity founded the company and then sold it to the Boston Herald in 2001. Five years later, the chain was purchased by, and immediately became the largest single component of, GateHouse Media. GateHouse gradually phased out CNC branding in favor of "WickedLocal.com", the company's website, and GateHouse Media New England; this process was complete by 2011, when staff email addresses dropped the "@cnc.com" domain.

== Holdings ==
CNC's flagship publication was The MetroWest Daily News, based in Framingham, Massachusetts. In 2011 it also published The Milford Daily News. It had also published, and closed, three other daily newspapers: The Daily News Transcript, The Daily News Tribune and the Enterprise-Sun.

The GateHouse purchase in mid-2006 included CNC as well as Enterprise News Media, publisher of two dailies and several weeklies that competed with CNC's South Shore holdings. The weeklies were incorporated into CNC and the company also forged close ties with its new sister dailies, The Enterprise and The Patriot Ledger, although they—and later GateHouse Media Massachusetts acquisitions The Herald News and the Taunton Daily Gazette—retained their own editorial hierarchy, however, and were not considered part of Community Newspaper Company.

CNC's holdings, as well as its Massachusetts sister papers and The Bulletin in Connecticut, now constitute GateHouse Media New England.

=== Weeklies ===
CNC published more than 100 weeklies, semiweeklies and monthly publications. Each publication was classified in one of five or six semi-autonomous units (Cape, Metro, North, Northwest, South, West), each with its own editor-in-chief, covering distinct geographic areas of eastern Massachusetts and named for its location with respect to Boston.

The West Unit included oversight over all the daily newspapers, in addition to most of the CNC weeklies that complement them; at times, the Cape Unit properties were considered part of the South Unit.
