= The Barnstable Patriot =

Weekly American newspaper

Coordinates: 41.653419°N 70.282212°W

- Type: Weekly newspaper
- Format: Broadsheet
- Owner: USA Today Co.
- Editor: Craig Salters
- Founded: 1830; 196 years ago
- Language: English
- Headquarters: 4 Ocean Street, Hyannis, Massachusetts 02601
- Circulation: 1,323 (as of 2018)
- Website: barnstablepatriot.com/
- Free online archives: Sturgis Library

The Barnstable Patriot is a weekly newspaper published in and for the town of Barnstable, Massachusetts, United States. Although it bills itself as "an independent voice since 1830", The Patriot has been owned, since 2019, by USA Today Co.

== History ==
Founded in 1830, The Barnstable Patriot is Cape Cod's oldest newspaper. It was started by Sylvanus B. Phinney; initially apprenticing under the journalist Nathan Hale at the Boston Daily Advertiser, he moved to The Barnstable Journal in 1828, before founding the Patriot two years later, at the age of 22.

A weekly paper, the paper espoused democratic values, with Phinney himself a Jacksonian Democrat. In the 1830s, with the founding of the Yarmouth Register a considerable back and forth battle emerged from those two papers due to the Register's championing of John Reed Jr., the local Whig member of Congress.

Phinney sold the paper in 1869 to Franklin B. Goss and George H. Richards. Goss, who had apprenticed at the Patriot before founding a string of local papers, shifted the paper's politics from Democratic to Republican, as his own support shifted to supporting President Grant's administration. He passed the paper on to his son, Franklin Percy Goss, who sold it to the Crocker family. After a very short tenure, the Crocker family sold it to George Haskins. It remained in the Haskins family for 61 years.

Rob and Toni Sennot bought the paper in 1994, and sold it to Ottaway Newspapers in 2005.

News Corp. acquired The Patriot when it bought Dow Jones & Company (Ottaway's parent) for US$5 billion in late 2007. Rupert Murdoch, the head of News Corp., reportedly told investors before the deal that he would be "selling the local newspapers fairly quickly" after the Dow Jones purchase.

On September 4, 2013, News Corp announced that it would sell the Dow Jones Local Media Group to Newcastle Investment Corp.—an affiliate of Fortress Investment Group, for $87 million. The newspapers will be operated by GateHouse Media, a newspaper group owned by Fortress. News Corp. CEO and former Wall Street Journal editor Robert James Thomson indicated that the newspapers were "not strategically consistent with the emerging portfolio" of the company. GateHouse in turn filed prepackaged Chapter 11 bankruptcy on September 27, 2013, to restructure its debt obligations in order to accommodate the acquisition.

== Sisters and competitors ==
Although Ottaway also owns The Patriot's main competitor, the daily Cape Cod Times, the weekly newspaper's newsroom is run independently of its rival. Robert F. Sennott Jr., who formerly owned the newspaper, was retained by Ottaway as publisher of The Patriot. Ottaway also owns the weekly The Inquirer and Mirror of Nantucket and daily The Standard-Times of New Bedford, Massachusetts.

Community Newspaper Company publishes a competitor weekly newspaper, The Register, in Barnstable.

== See also ==
- List of newspapers in Massachusetts
