= Local Media Group =

Newspaper company (1936–2013)

Local Media Group, Inc.
- Type: Subsidiary
- Industry: News media
- Founded: November 1936
- Defunct: December 2013
- Fate: Acquired by New Media Investment Group
- Headquarters: Campbell Hall, New York; United States
- Products: Daily and weekly newspapers
- Number of employees: 1,500
- Website: www.localmediagroupinc.com

Local Media Group, Inc., formerly Dow Jones Local Media Group and Ottaway Newspapers Inc., owned newspapers, websites and niche publications in California, Maine, Massachusetts, New Hampshire, New York, Oregon and Pennsylvania. It was headquartered in Campbell Hall, New York, and its flagship was the Times Herald-Record, serving Middletown and other suburbs of New York City.

The Ottaway organization was founded in by James H. Ottaway Sr., owner of the Endicott Daily Bulletin of Endicott, NY, in 1936. It had grown to nine newspapers in the northeastern United States by 1970, when it was acquired by Dow Jones & Company, publisher of The Wall Street Journal, and later a subsidiary of Rupert Murdoch's News Corporation. Following the 2013 split of News Corporation into 21st Century Fox and News Corp, News Corp sold the Dow Jones Local Media Group to Newcastle Investment Corp., an affiliate of Fortress Investment Group, which placed the holdings in the GateHouse Media portfolio of its New Media Investment Group, renamed Gannett following that company's 2019 acquisition by New Media Investment Group.

== History ==
=== Ottaway newspapers ===
James H. Ottaway Sr. founded the company in November 1936, when he purchased the Bulletin, a semi-weekly paper in Endicott, New York, that he converted to a daily within a year. Ottaway added the Oneonta Star in 1944, followed two years later by the Pocono Record.

The company was a seller more often than a buyer in the 2000s (decade), however, and several observers—including the New York Post, The Boston Globe and Ottaway's own Cape Cod Times—speculated that News Corporation intended to sell all or part of the company in the near future.

=== Dow Jones Local Media Group ===
Under Dow Jones' ownership, Ottaway sold several newspapers in recent years, however, most recently in December 2006, when the company dealt nearly half its daily newspapers to Community Newspaper Holdings Inc. (CNHI) for $287.9 million (including real estate).

Until December 2006, the following dailies and weeklies were also part of the Ottaway chain. Other than the California and Connecticut newspapers, they are all now part of CNHI.

- Santa Cruz Sentinel daily of Santa Cruz, California
- The News-Times daily of Danbury, Connecticut
- The Spectrum weekly of Milford, Connecticut
- Traverse City Record-Eagle daily of Traverse City, Michigan
- The Grand Traverse Herald weekly of Traverse City, Michigan
- Cooperstown Crier weekly of Cooperstown, New York
- Daily Star of Oneonta, New York
- Press-Republican of Plattsburgh, New York
- Daily Item of Sunbury, Pennsylvania
- The Danville News weekdays only, of Danville, Pennsylvania

These four daily newspapers were sold by Ottaway to CNHI for $182 million in 2002:

- The Herald of Sharon, Pennsylvania
- The Independent of Ashland, Kentucky
- The Free Press of Mankato, Minnesota
- The Joplin Globe of Joplin, Missouri

Also, Ottaway sold the three daily newspapers of Essex County Newspapers Inc. to The Eagle-Tribune of North Andover, Massachusetts, in 2002, for $70 million. The Eagle-Tribune, along with the Essex papers listed below, was later purchased by CNHI.

- Daily News of Newburyport of Newburyport, Massachusetts
- Gloucester Daily Times of Gloucester, Massachusetts
- Salem Evening News of Salem, Massachusetts

=== Sale to Newcastle ===
On September 4, 2013, News Corp announced that it would sell the Dow Jones Local Media Group to Newcastle Investment Corp.—an affiliate of Fortress Investment Group, for $87 million. The newspapers will be operated by GateHouse Media, a newspaper group owned by Fortress. News Corp. CEO and former Wall Street Journal editor Robert James Thomson indicated that the newspapers were "not strategically consistent with the emerging portfolio" of the company. GateHouse in turn filed prepackaged Chapter 11 bankruptcy on September 27, 2013, to restructure its debt obligations in order to accommodate the acquisition. Newcastle combined Local Media Group with the post-bankruptcy GateHouse Media later in 2013 to form New Media Investment Group.

== Holdings ==
=== Holdings by frequency of publication ===
Dow Jones Local Media Group published eight daily and 15 weekly newspapers in seven U.S. states. Its circulation was given in 2005 as 282,000 daily, 316,000 Sunday and 119,000 daily unique visitors on newspaper Internet sites.

Daily newspapers are:

- Ashland Daily Tidings of Ashland, Oregon (sold)
- Cape Cod Times of Barnstable, Massachusetts
- Mail Tribune of Medford, Oregon (sold)
- Pocono Record of Stroudsburg, Pennsylvania
- The Portsmouth Herald of Portsmouth, New Hampshire
- The Record of Stockton, California
- The Standard-Times of New Bedford, Massachusetts
- Times Herald-Record of Middletown, New York

Weekly and twice-weekly newspapers include the following:

- The Barnstable Patriot of Barnstable, Massachusetts
- The Inquirer & Mirror of Nantucket, Massachusetts
- Hathaway Publishing, published alongside The Standard-Times:
  - The Advocate of Fairhaven, Massachusetts
  - The Chronicle of Dartmouth, Massachusetts
  - The Fall River Spirit of Fall River, Massachusetts
  - Middleboro Gazette of Middleborough, Massachusetts
  - The Spectator of Somerset, Massachusetts
  - The New England Business Bulletin of Southeastern Massachusetts
- Seacoast Media Group, published alongside The Portsmouth Herald:
  - The Exeter News-Letter of Exeter, New Hampshire (twice-weekly)
  - The Hampton Union of Hampton, New Hampshire (twice-weekly)
  - The Rockingham News of Plaistow, New Hampshire
  - York County Coast Star of Kennebunk, Maine
  - The York Weekly of York, Maine
- Hudson Valley Media Group, published alongside the Times Herald-Record:
  - The Gazette of Port Jervis, New York

=== Holdings by location ===
Holdings as of September 2013, immediately after News Corporation sold the Dow Jones Local Media Group portfolio, with its name then shortened to Local Media Group, was merged into the new owner's GateHouse Media group.

California

- The Desert Dispatch, Barstow, CA
- The Record, Stockton, CA
- The Daily Press, Victorville, CA

Massachusetts

- The Advocate
- Barnstable Patriot
- Cape Cod Times
- Cape Cod View
- The Chronicle
- The Fall River Spirit
- The Inquirer and Mirror, Nantucket, MA
- Middleboro Gazette
- Nantucket Today
- New England Business Bulletin
- The Spectator
- The Standard-Times, New Bedford, MA

New Hampshire

- The Exeter News-Letter
- Foster's Daily Democrat
- The Hampton Union
- The Portsmouth Herald
- York County Coast Star
- The York Weekly

New York

- Limelight Deals, Middletown, NY
- Marketing Blacksmith, Middletown, NY
- Orange Magazine
- Times Herald-Record, Middletown, NY

Oregon

- Ashland Daily Tidings (sold)
- Medford Mail Tribune (sold)
- The Nickel, Medford, OR (sold)

Pennsylvania

- Pocono Record, Stroudsburg, PA
