= Mail Tribune =

Newspaper in Medford, Oregon

- Type: Daily newspaper
- Format: Broadsheet
- Owner: Rosebud Media LLC
- Publisher: Steven Saslow (2017–2023)
- Editor: Bob Hunter (1985–2016); Cathy Noah (2016–2022); David Smigelski (2022–2023)
- Founded: April 2, 1907
- Ceased publication: January 13, 2023
- Language: English
- Headquarters: 111 North Fir Street, Medford, Oregon 97501 United States
- Sister newspapers: Ashland Daily Tidings
- Website: mailtribune.com

The Mail Tribune was a seven-day daily newspaper based in Medford, Oregon, United States that served Jackson County, Oregon, and adjacent areas of Josephine County, Oregon and northern California. The paper ceased operations on January 13, 2023. The closure was announced by Rosebud Media, the paper's owner, two days prior.

Its coverage area centered on Medford and Ashland and included many small communities in Jackson County. The newspaper also covered Central Point, Talent, Eagle Point, Grants Pass and Phoenix, as well as Jacksonville and other cities in the Rogue Valley.

== History ==
In 1888, Thomas Harlan founded the Mail in Medford, Oregon. He was followed as publisher by Newell Harlan in 1890, Felix G. Kertson in 1891 and possibly at some point Ira Phelps. A. S. Bliton bought the paper from Kerton in 1893 and ran it for 16 years. At that time the paper was called the Southern Oregon Mail, but Bliton renamed it to the Medford Mail. It had been affiliated with People's Party, but Bliton went independent and lost half of his 500 subscribers due to his unpopular political attitude. Within two years he grew circulation to 1,500 and for a time brought W. T. York on as partner after 1894.

In 1909, Bliton sold the Mail to George Putnam, who then merged it with the Southern Oregonian, Jacksonville Times and Medford Tribune to form the Medford Mail-Tribune. The paper was viewed as a successor to the Oregon Sentinel, the first newspaper published in southern Oregon. Putnam was seen as the "epitome of the fighting editor during the Progressive Era in Oregon" and his journalism was notable enough to warrant George Stanley Turnbull authoring two books on him and his work at the paper.

In 1919, Putnam retired as president of the Medford Printing Company to own and operate the Capital Journal in Salem. He was succeeded by Robert W. Ruhl. Under his leadership, the Mail Tribune was awarded the 1934 Pulitzer Prize for Meritorious Service, for its coverage of Llewellyn Banks and other corrupt Jackson County politicians. The Ruhl family operated the paper for 62 years until selling it in 1973 to Ottaway Newspapers, a subsidiarity of the Dow Jones, owner of The Wall Street Journal. The company was acquired in 2007 by News Corp, owned by Rupert Murdoch.

On September 4, 2013, News Corp announced that it would sell Ottaway Newspapers, by then known as Dow Jones Local Media Group, to Newcastle Investment Corp., an affiliate of Fortress Investment Group for $87 million. The newspapers were to be operated by GateHouse Media, owned by Fortress. News Corp. CEO and former Wall Street Journal editor Robert James Thomson indicated that the newspapers were "not strategically consistent with the emerging portfolio" of the company. GateHouse in turn filed prepackaged Chapter 11 bankruptcy on September 27, 2013, to restructure its debt obligations in order to accommodate the acquisition.

The Mail Tribune and Ashland Daily Tidings were sold to Rosebud Media in 2017 for a reported $15 million. On September 21, 2022, the Mail Tribune announced it would discontinue its printed edition and only publish online. The Mail Tribune published its final online articles on January 13, 2023, and ceased operations. In 2026, the Southern Oregon Historical Society acquired the paper's archive.
