= Seacoast Media Group =

Seacoast Media Group is a unit of Local Media Group. Seacoast publishes five weekly newspapers and one daily, The Portsmouth Herald, along the coasts of New Hampshire and York County, Maine, United States.

The group publisher is John Tabor; its executive editor is Howard Altschiller.

On September 4, 2013, News Corp announced that it would sell the Dow Jones Local Media Group to Newcastle Investment Corp.—an affiliate of Fortress Investment Group, for $87 million. The newspapers will be operated by GateHouse Media, a newspaper group owned by Fortress. News Corp. CEO and former Wall Street Journal editor Robert James Thomson indicated that the newspapers were "not strategically consistent with the emerging portfolio" of the company. GateHouse in turn filed prepackaged Chapter 11 bankruptcy on September 27, 2013, to restructure its debt obligations in order to accommodate the acquisition.

== Seacoast's newspapers ==
The information in these profiles is based on the SMG 2007 Retail Rate Card. Circulation figures refer to the company's reports of average press runs for July–September 2006.

=== The Exeter News-Letter ===
Delivered by carrier to 5,500 subscribers each Friday morning in Brentwood, East Kingston, Epping, Exeter, Kensington, Newfields, Newmarket, South Hampton and Stratham, New Hampshire. On Sundays, subscribers to The News-Letter receive the Herald Sunday.

=== The Hampton Union ===
Delivered by carrier to 4,810 subscribers each Friday and Tuesday morning in Hampton, Hampton Falls, North Hampton and Seabrook, New Hampshire. On Sundays, subscribers to The Union receive the Herald Sunday.

=== York County Coast Star ===
Mailed each Thursday to 9,685 subscribers in Arundel, Kennebunk, Kennebunkport, Ogunquit and Wells, Maine.

=== The York Weekly ===
Mailed each Wednesday to 4,315 subscribers in York, Maine.

=== The New Hampshire ===
Prints approximately 3,000 copies each week for the University of New Hampshire and Durham communities, as well as surrounding towns.
