= Ashland Daily Tidings =

- Type: Daily newspaper
- Format: Tabloid
- Owner: Rosebud Media
- Founder: James M. Sutton
- Founded: June 17, 1876
- Ceased publication: August 1, 2021
- Language: English
- OCLC number: 34915030

The Ashland Daily Tidings was a daily newspaper serving the city of Ashland, Oregon, United States. It was owned and published by Edd Rountree, a well-known journalist in the state, from 1960 to 1985. Over the years the paper was owned by local families and companies including Capital Cities/ABC and Lee Enterprises before being purchased by the Medford-based Mail Tribune, which later absorbed the Tidings and itself ceased on January 13, 2023.

Around that time the newspaper's old domain name was claimed by a company that posts articles from other sources, slightly changed by artificial intelligence. Lawyers have been unable to trace the origins of the new site.

== History ==
On June 17, 1876, James M. Sutton founded the Ashland Tidings. At the time Ashland, Oregon had a population of 500. In his first editorial, Sutton wrote "Believing that there is ample room in southern Oregon for a good independent family newspaper, we have resolved to make our effort to establish such a one."

Sutton's health declined after a few issues. J. M. McCall then managed the paper followed by Capt. O. C. Applegate becoming publisher in 1878. A year later William Leeds and Corliss Merritt purchased the paper. Merritt soon sold out to Leeds and years later he sold his interest to longtime employee Fred D. Wagner in 1894. Wagner installed the paper's first linotype machine in 1908.

In March 1911, R. B. Bennett purchased the paper and ran it with his brother. He was a Yale University graduate who had worked for two years at the paper as a court reporter and telegraph editor. About nine months later Bennett sold the Tidings to Bert R. Greer. He died in 1926 and his widow Lillian Harris Greer owned the paper until her death in 1945. During her tenure the paper was edited and managed by G. M. Green. Graham M. Dean, publisher of the Reno Gazette, purchased the paper in 1950. He bought it from Green, trustee for paper's three owners.

Edd Ellsworth Rountree purchased the paper in 1960. Rountree published if for a decade and became known statewide for his popular daily column on politics and current events which appeared on front page with a caricature above noting his opinion. Rountree sold the paper in 1970 to the Democrat-Herald Publishing Co, which published the Albany Democrat-Herald. Capital Cities purchased the company in 1980, which itself was acquired by The Walt Disney Company in 1995. Disney sold its Oregon newspapers to Lee Enterprises in 1997. Lee sold the Daily Tidings to the Dow Jones & Company in 2002. The paper were managed by Local Media Group, another subsidiary of the international company News Corp.

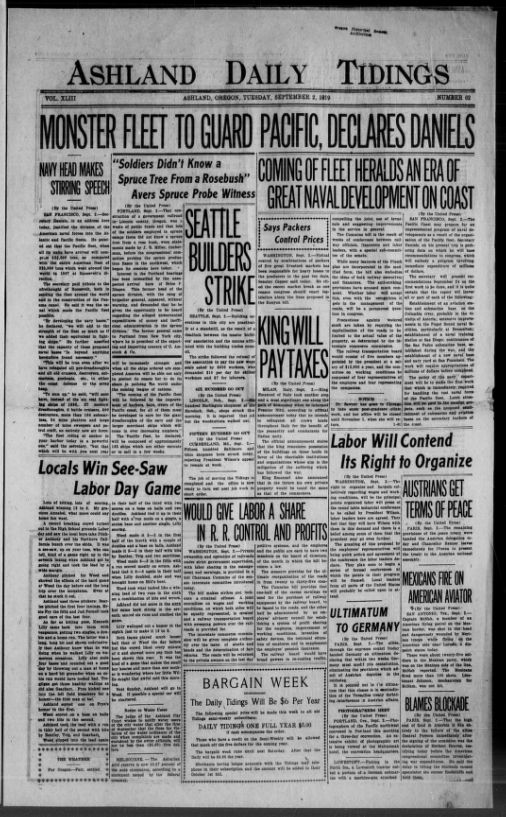
Front page of the newspaper on September 2, 1919

On September 4, 2013, News Corp announced that it would sell Local Media Group to Newcastle Investment Corp., an affiliate of Fortress Investment Group, for $87 million. The newspapers were to be operated by GateHouse Media, a newspaper group owned by Fortress. News Corp CEO and former Wall Street Journal editor Robert James Thomson indicated that the newspapers were "not strategically consistent with the emerging portfolio" of the company. GateHouse in turn filed prepackaged Chapter 11 bankruptcy on September 27, 2013, to restructure its debt obligations in order to accommodate the acquisition.

In 2017, the Tidings and the Mail Tribune were sold by GateHouse to Rosebud Media. On July 15, 2021, the owner of the Daily Tidings announced the paper would be replaced with an Ashland Edition of the Mail Tribune starting in August. Two years later the Tribune ceased on January 13, 2023. Soon after the Tidings' web domain was purchased by scammers who relaunched the website with articles written with Generative AI and sometimes featuring stolen bylines.

== Awards ==
The Tidings was one of three daily newspapers to win the Charles Sprague Award of General Excellence from the Oregon Newspaper Publishers Association in 1981. In 2006 the Daily Tidings was awarded the "General Excellence" prize by the ONPA. In 2015, it won five awards including a first place for best educational coverage from the ONPA.
