= The Portsmouth Herald =

Newspaper from New Hampshire, US

- Type: Daily newspaper
- Format: Broadsheet
- Owner: USA Today Co.
- Publisher: John Tabor
- Editor: Howard Altschiller
- Founded: September 23, 1884, as The Penny Post
- Headquarters: 111 New Hampshire Avenue, Portsmouth, New Hampshire 03801, United States
- Circulation: 6,202 (as of 2018)
- ISSN: 0746-6218
- Website: seacoastonline.com

The Portsmouth Herald (and Seacoast Weekend) is a six-day daily newspaper serving greater Portsmouth, New Hampshire. Its coverage area also includes the municipalities of Greenland, New Castle, Newington and Rye, New Hampshire; and Eliot, Kittery, Kittery Point and South Berwick, Maine.

Unlike most New England daily newspapers, The Herald's circulation grew in the 2000s. Its editors in 2001 credited the newspaper's resurgence with the introduction of the "Wow! factor"—front-page stories on controversial or sensational topics that appeal to younger readers.

== Founding ==
The Portsmouth Herald considers its foundation date to be September 23, 1884, the day that its predecessor The Penny Post first appeared in Portsmouth. The Penny Post (named for its newsstand price) within two years was claiming to have the largest circulation base in New England. The Post adopted the name Portsmouth Herald in mid-1897, and cost 2 cents per issue.

Traced back through the history of its sister papers, however, the Herald has an even longer pedigree. In 1891, F.W. Hartford took over The Penny Post and initiated a newspaper war with two of the city's longest established papers, the Morning Chronicle (daily since 1852) and the weekly New Hampshire Gazette (the state's oldest newspaper, established October 7, 1756). He eventually bought out his rivals, and announced on April 5, 1898, that he had taken control of the Chronicle and Gazette.

Hartford continued to publish the Morning Chronicle as the morning counterpart to the evening Herald until his death in 1938; he and his son J.D. Hartford kept The New Hampshire Gazette in print as the weekend edition of the Herald, partially out of pride in being associated with "the nation's oldest newspaper". Even after the Herald's Sunday paper was renamed in the 1960s, the slogan "Continuing the tradition of the N.H. Gazette" continued to appear on the front page.

Eventually the Herald allowed its claim to the Gazette's history fall into disuse, and in 1989, a descendant of the Gazette's founder began publishing an alternative weekly newspaper under the name The New Hampshire Gazette.

== Ownership ==
The Herald and its sister weekly newspapers in New Hampshire and Maine form the Seacoast Media Group, a subsidiary of Local Media Group. It was acquired for the Ottaway chain by Dow Jones & Company, which formerly owned the chain, December 1, 1997, in a newspaper swap in which Thomson Corporation gained The News-Sun of Sun City, Arizona.

News Corporation acquired The Herald when it bought former owner Dow Jones & Company for US$5 billion in late 2007. Rupert Murdoch, the head of News Corp., reportedly told investors before the deal that he would be "selling the local newspapers fairly quickly" after the Dow Jones purchase.

On September 4, 2013, News Corp announced that it would sell the Dow Jones Local Media Group to Newcastle Investment Corp.—an affiliate of Fortress Investment Group, for $87 million. The newspapers will be operated by GateHouse Media, a newspaper group owned by Fortress. News Corp. CEO and former Wall Street Journal editor Robert James Thomson indicated that the newspapers were "not strategically consistent with the emerging portfolio" of the company. GateHouse in turn filed prepackaged Chapter 11 bankruptcy on September 27, 2013, to restructure its debt obligations in order to accommodate the acquisition.

== Competition ==
During the tail end of Thomson's ownership of The Herald, it was seen as corporate and out-of-touch with the local community. Several weekly newspapers sprang up to challenge it in Portsmouth and surrounding towns.

Years before buying The Herald, Ottaway started a weekly newspaper, the Portsmouth Press, in 1987. For six years, that paper competed with the daily. Its publisher, John Tabor, eventually became publisher of The Herald.

The Herald's strongest daily competitors are Foster's Daily Democrat in nearby Dover, New Hampshire, and the statewide New Hampshire Union Leader. In the late 1990s, the Geo. J. Foster Company launched Foster's Sunday Citizen, to compete with Herald Sunday and the state's largest Sunday paper, the New Hampshire Sunday News. Around the same time, The Herald's Ottaway managers announced they would begin distributing Herald Sunday outside of the daily newspaper's coverage area, into the Exeter and Hampton areas, where Seacoast Media Group publishes weeklies.

The paper also faces hometown competition from an alternative newsweekly, The New Hampshire Gazette, named after the state's oldest newspaper, which had been absorbed into the Herald in the 1890s.

On October 31, 2010, Seacoast Media Group announced plans to charge online users nearly $69 per year to access the previously free content. The fee took effect November 16, 2010. The print edition is $1.00 a day ($2.00 on Seacoast Weekend).
