= Hathaway Publishing =

Newspaper

- Type: Subsidiary
- Founded: 1932
- Defunct: December 2013
- Fate: Acquired by GateHouse Media
- Headquarters: 780 County Street, Somerset, Massachusetts 02726; United States
- Area served: South Coast of Massachusetts
- Key people: Peter Meyer, publisher Warren G. Hathaway, publisher emeritus Phil Devitt, managing editor
- Products: Weekly newspapers
- Parent: Dow Jones, 1997-2007; News Corporation, 2007-2013
- Website: hathawaypublishing.com

Hathaway Publishing was a subsidiary of The Local Media Group Inc. Hathaway published five weekly newspapers in the South Coast region of Massachusetts.

== History ==
Owned by the Hathaway family until 1997, the company later partnered with its former competitor, the Ottaway daily The Standard-Times of New Bedford, Massachusetts. Together, the two companies comprised Ottaway's South Coast Media Group. William T. Kennedy serves as publisher of both properties, although former owner Warren G. Hathaway is publisher emeritus of the weeklies. Both Hathaway and The Standard-Times contribute to a regional Web site, SouthCoastToday.com.

News Corp. acquired Ottaway when it bought parent company Dow Jones & Company for US$5 billion in late 2007. Rupert Murdoch, the head of News Corp., reportedly told investors before the deal that he would be "selling the local newspapers fairly quickly" after the Dow Jones purchase.

On September 4, 2013, News Corp announced that it would sell the Dow Jones Local Media Group to Newcastle Investment Corp.—an affiliate of Fortress Investment Group, for $87 million. The newspapers will be operated by GateHouse Media, a newspaper group owned by Fortress. News Corp. CEO and former Wall Street Journal editor Robert James Thomson indicated that the newspapers were "not strategically consistent with the emerging portfolio" of the company. GateHouse in turn filed prepackaged Chapter 11 bankruptcy on September 27, 2013, to restructure its debt obligations in order to accommodate the acquisition.

== Holdings ==
Hathaway published four newspapers at the time Ottaway bought it: The Advocate, The Chronicle, the Middleboro Gazette and The Spectator. The Somerset, Massachusetts–based family company was founded by Sidney L. Hathaway Jr., who established The Spectator there in 1932. In 2003, Ottaway added the fifth newspaper, The Fall River Spirit.
