= Gloucester Daily Times =

Newspaper in Gloucester, Massachusetts

- Type: Daily newspaper
- Format: Broadsheet
- Owner: Community Newspaper Holdings Inc.
- Publisher: Jim Falzone
- Editor: Andrea Holbrook
- Founded: June 16, 1888
- Headquarters: 503 Gloucester Crossing Road, Gloucester, Massachusetts 01930, United States
- Circulation: 7,463 Daily (as of 2012)
- OCLC number: 20688560
- Website: gloucestertimes.com

The Gloucester Daily Times is an American daily newspaper published Mondays and Wednesdays through Fridays in Gloucester, Massachusetts by Eagle-Tribune Publishing Company, a subsidiary of Community Newspaper Holdings Inc. The price is $4.

In addition to its home city, the paper also covers adjacent towns on Cape Ann in Essex County: Essex, Manchester-by-the-Sea and Rockport. Its circulation in 2012 was approximately 10,000, giving it some 22,000 readers each day.

== History ==
Gloucester Daily Times began as an independent daily in 1888. However, in the 21st century the paper has the centerpiece of a consolidation effort that once saw almost all the North Shore papers bought by one owner, CNHI.

Essex County Newspapers was founded by Philip Saltonstall Weld, a former International Herald Tribune publisher who bought newspapers in Gloucester and Newburyport in 1952, later adding the Beverly and Peabody titles. Weld was among the first small-daily publishers to endorse political candidates, and in 1958 the Gloucester Daily Times became the first afternoon daily to print its Saturday edition in the morning, to put its pressmen on a five-day workweek.

By the 1980s, the chain was owned by Ottaway Community Newspapers, a division of Dow Jones & Company, which also owned the Cape Cod Times and The Standard-Times of New Bedford. Ottaway added The Salem Evening News to its holdings, closing the evening Beverly Times and Peabody Times, in 1995.

The Eagle-Tribune of North Andover, one of Essex County Newspapers' chief competitors, bought the North Shore chain in 2002, paying US$70 million for the Gloucester Daily Times, The Daily News of Newburyport and The Salem Evening News. Eagle-Tribune executives touted the creation of a regional news organization; they also laid off some 45 staffers at the Essex County papers, including the editors of the Newburyport and Salem papers.

The Eagle-Tribune chain was itself bought for an undisclosed amount of money by Community Newspaper Holdings, an Alabama company, in 2005.

Local folk duo Daisy Nell and Captain Stan recorded "G.D. Times", a tongue in cheek salute to the paper and how it covers everything from "who knows all the town meeting rules?" to "whose dog had puppies" to "who can dig for clams this year?"
