= Storyful =

Social media and news intelligence agency

- Founded: 2010; 16 years ago
- Founder: Mark Little
- Headquarters: Dublin, Ireland
- Area served: Global
- Key people: Maria Pacheco (CEO); Martin O'Connor (CFO)
- Products: Social media intelligence
- Parent: News Corp
- Website: storyful.com

Storyful (stylized as storyful.) is a social media intelligence company headquartered in Dublin, Ireland that is a subsidiary of News Corp, offering services such as social news monitoring, video licensing, and reputation risk management tools for corporate clients. The startup was launched as the first social media newswire, a content aggregator, verifying news sources and online content in Dublin in 2010 by Mark Little, a former journalist with RTÉ News. Storyful was acquired by News Corp in 2013 for USD25 million.

== Background ==
Mark Little, who had worked as a television journalist for RTÉ One, founded startup Storyful in Dublin, Ireland, in 2010, as a service that "verified news sources and online content". According to Nieman Lab, Storyful had a reputation for content aggregation as a social news agency—finding, verifying, distributing, licensing, and commercializing user-generated content, social media and online content from social networking services, including videos about stories in the news, such as the Syrian Civil War, Arab Spring protests, as well as "smaller viral moments". Storyful aimed to provide authority through its verification and monitoring tools while providing authenticity through user-generated content.

On 20 December 2013 News Corp purchased Storyful for US$25 million and opened a New York office in the same building as Fox News' main studios.

Little left Storyful in 2015 and Gavin Sheridan, Storyful's director of innovation left in 2014.

News Corp CEO Robert Thomson said that through Storyful, News Corp would "define the opportunities that the digital landscape presents, rather than simply adapt to them." After the acquisition, the company expanded its service to include "commercial and creative work".

After Murdoch acquired the company, from 2014 through to February 2018, losses "swelled", requiring a series of cash injections from News Corp. During that time the company expanded aggressively globally with a staff of about 200 worldwide up from about 30 in 2014.

According to The Guardian, in 2016, journalists were encouraged by Storyful to use the social media monitoring software called Verify developed by Storyful. By installing Verify's web browser extension on their computers, Verify would inform the journalists when social media content had been "verified and cleared". The Guardian revealed that through the Verify plugin, dozens of staff in four offices had access to the journalists browsing activity without them knowing. This data allowed Storyful to actively monitor its own clients' activities on social media and to "turn it into an internal feed" at Storyful that "updates in real time".

In November 2018, when a video circulated by Infowars' Paul Joseph Watson appeared to prove that CNN's Jim Acosta's contact with a White House intern was a physical blow, Storyful was able to prove that the 15-second-long clip had been doctored. (Note: A two-second long snippet was repeated, pausing three frames for a fraction of a second, which resulted in a slight time compression elsewhere.)

According to a 21 January 2019 article in CNN Business, Rob McDonagh, the editor of Storyful's U.S. news team, had proven that one of the viral videos that served as catalysts in the January 2019 Lincoln Memorial confrontation at 18 January 2019 Indigenous Peoples March, was posted by a suspicious account, under the handle @2020fight. McDonagh's team validates videos and posts before adding them to their "digest", distinguishing true stories from those that are not. (Note: According to The New Yorker article, McDonagh's team includes news analysts with different specialties including Anne Winberry who is a trends editor. Michael Edison Hayden "covers the dark underbellies of the Internet" such as the 4chan, 8chan, Daily Caller, etc.) Storyful attempts to validate each post or video before including it in its digest. McDonagh reviewed previous content from @2020fight's account, and found it suspicious because it had a high follower count, a "highly polarized and yet inconsistent political messaging", an "unusually high rate of tweets", and "the use of someone else's image in the profile photo." reporter Donie O'Sullivan said that the @2020fight video that had been posted on 18 January, which had 2.5 million views by 22 January, was the one that "helped frame the news cycle". Currently the website offers a service by which video can be commercially brokered.

== Services ==
Services include a newswire service—one of their "core pillars"—and social news monitoring. By February 2018, Storyful was developing "risk and reputation monitoring" services through which they would source and verify social news, fact-checking it and contextualising it for corporate clients. They were "developing tech tools" to "explore obscure or closed networks" for their intelligence team. can use to explore obscure or closed networks. They "track deviations in social conversations around brands and organisations and catch potential risks before they blow up. Like an alerts system." The company released a re-booted version of its Newswire platform in 2018. According to FORA, Storyful was developing new tools to combat fake news online.

== Clients ==
When Storyful was acquired by News Corp in 2013, the company already had the Wall Street Journal, the BBC, New York Times, YouTube, ITN and Channel 4 News as clients. By 2018 their clients included CNN, ABC News and Fox News, The New York Times, the Washington Post, in the United States, the Australian Broadcasting Corporation and all of News Corp’s own publications. Most of their "reputation-conscious corporate customers" clients prefer to not be named.
