= The Daily News of Newburyport =

Newspaper in Massachusetts, United States

- Type: Daily newspaper
- Format: Broadsheet
- Owner(s): Community Newspaper Holdings Inc.
- Publisher: John Celestino
- Editor: David Rogers
- Founded: 1887
- Headquarters: 23 Liberty Street, Newburyport, Massachusetts 01950, United States
- Circulation: 9,649 daily (as of 2012)
- OCLC number: 22410213
- Website: newburyportnews.com

The Daily News of Newburyport is an American daily newspaper covering northeastern Essex County, Massachusetts, USA. The newspaper is published Monday through Saturday mornings by North of Boston Media Group, a subsidiary of Community Newspaper Holdings Inc.

Based in Newburyport, Massachusetts, the paper also covers several neighboring cities and towns: Amesbury, Georgetown, Merrimac, Newbury, Rowley, Salisbury and West Newbury, Massachusetts, and Seabrook, New Hampshire.

== History ==
Although it began as an independent daily in 1887, in the 21st century the paper has been part of a consolidation effort that has seen almost all the North Shore papers bought by one owner, CNHI.

Essex County Newspapers was founded by Philip Saltonstall Weld, a former International Herald Tribune publisher who bought newspapers in Gloucester and Newburyport in 1952, later adding Beverly and Peabody titles. Weld was among the first small-daily publishers to endorse political candidates.

By the 1980s, the chain was owned by Ottaway Community Newspapers, a division of Dow Jones & Company, which also owned the Cape Cod Times and The Standard-Times of New Bedford. Ottaway added The Salem Evening News to its holdings, closing the evening Beverly Times and Peabody Times, in 1995.

The Eagle-Tribune of North Andover, one of Essex County Newspapers' chief competitors, bought the North Shore chain in 2002, paying US$70 million for the Gloucester Daily Times, The Daily News of Newburyport and The Salem Evening News. Eagle-Tribune executives touted the creation of a regional news organization; they also laid off some 45 staffers at the Essex County papers, including the editors of the Newburyport and Salem papers.

The Eagle-Tribune chain, now the dominant daily news organization on the seacoast north of Boston, was itself bought for an undisclosed amount of money by Community Newspaper Holdings, an Alabama company, in 2005.

Richard K. Lodge was hired as managing editor in October 2016, after working as editor-in-chief for The MetroWest Daily News in Framingham, Massachusetts, since 2001. Lodge's title was changed to editor of The Daily News of Newburyport in December 2017. Lodge retired in December 2021, and was replaced as editor by Daily News reporter David Rogers.

== Prices ==
The Daily News prices are: $1 Monday-Friday, $1.50 on Saturday. Digital subscriptions also are available.
