= The Salem News =

Daily newspaper in Massachusetts, US

- Type: Daily newspaper
- Format: Broadsheet
- Owner: CNHI
- Publisher: John Celestino
- Editor: David Olson
- Founded: October 16, 1880, as Salem Evening News
- Headquarters: 300 Rosewood Drive, Suite 107; Danvers, Massachusetts 01923; United States
- Circulation: 20,295 Daily (as of 2012)
- ISSN: 3069-4523 (print); 3069-4531 (web)
- Website: salemnews.com

The Salem News (formerly The Salem Evening News) is an American daily newspaper serving southern Essex County, Massachusetts. Although the paper is named for the city of Salem, its offices are now in nearby Danvers, Massachusetts. The newspaper is published Monday, Wednesday, Thursday and Friday mornings by Eagle-Tribune Publishing Company, a subsidiary of CNHI.

In addition to its home cities, the News covers most of southern Essex County, northeast of Boston. The paper formerly published separate editions in Beverly and Peabody. In 2007, the paper's circulation was 31,591 and its readership was around 63,000. By 2012, circulation was 20,295.

== History ==
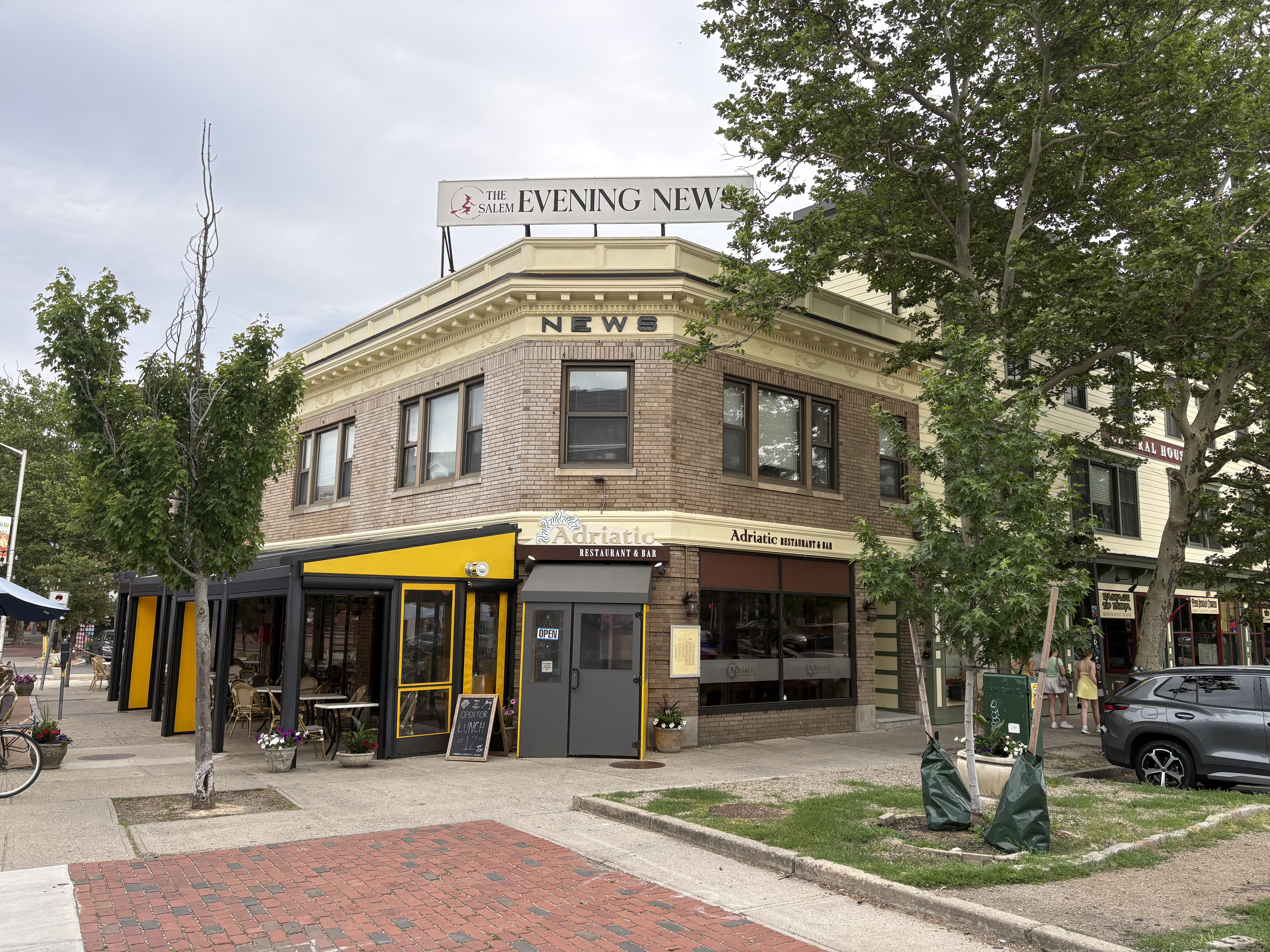
Former headquarters of The Salem Evening News on Washington Street and Front Street in Salem, now used as a restaurant. The paper's headquarters has moved to nearby Danvers

In 1995, the assets of the long-independent Salem Evening News was bought for US$16.5 million by Ottaway Community Newspapers, a division of Dow Jones & Company and owner of two of the Evening News's chief daily competitors, the evening Beverly Times (9,000 circulation) and Peabody Times (3,000 circulation). The Evening News had a circulation around 36,000 at the time of the sale. Ottaway's Essex County Newspapers division, which also published the Gloucester Daily Times and The Daily News of Newburyport, moved its headquarters to the Evening News's Beverly offices. It merged the Salem and Peabody papers into the Beverly Times, and renamed the Beverly paper the Salem News in order to gain a non-union work force. Before this, the Salem News headquarters had been on the corner Washington and Front Street in Salem.

Ottaway sold its Essex County holdings, including the Salem paper, to their top competitor seven years later. It continued to publish the Cape Cod Times and The Standard-Times in southeastern Massachusetts for some time before they too were sold.

The Eagle-Tribune of North Andover bought the North Shore chain in 2002, paying US$70 million for the Gloucester, Newburyport and Salem papers. Eagle-Tribune executives touted the creation of a regional news organization; they also laid off some 45 staffers at the Essex County papers, including the editors of the Newburyport and Salem papers.

The Eagle-Tribune chain was itself bought for an undisclosed amount of money by Community Newspaper Holdings (now CNHI), an Alabama company, in 2005.

== Prices ==
The Salem News prices are: $1 Monday–Saturday. The newspaper's website is paywalled.
