= The Advocate (Fairhaven) =

Weekly newspaper from Fairhaven, Massachusetts

- Type: Weekly newspaper
- Founder: Gil Vieira
- Founded: 1979
- Ceased publication: 2021
- Language: English
- Website: advocate.southcoasttoday.com

The Fairhaven Advocate was a community newspaper that served the communities of Acushnet, Massachusetts and Fairhaven, Massachusetts. Founded in 1979, it was later operated by local newspaper company Hathaway Publishing, owned by Local Media Group. The newspaper ceased publishing original stories and discontinued its print edition in 2021.

== History ==
In 1979, Gil Vieira first began publishing The Advocate, a weekly newspaper dedicated to the interests of Fairhaven.

Dana Reeves was editor in the mid-1980s.

In the quarter century that has passed since the newspaper first hit stands, the publication grew to cover the town of Acushnet in addition to Fairhaven. Since the late 1990s The Advocate has been printed by Hathaway Publishing, now a division of South Coast Media Group.

As of 1997, it had a circulation of 2,200.

== Affiliates ==
- The Standard-Times New Bedford
- The Somerset Spectator
- The Dartmouth/Westport Chronicle
- The Fall River Spirit
- The Middleboro Gazette
