= The Inquirer and Mirror =

Weekly newspaper on Nantucket Island, Massachusetts

- Type: Weekly newspaper
- Format: Broadsheet
- Owner: 41 North Media
- Publisher: Robert Saurer
- Editor: Josh Balling
- Founded: 1821
- Headquarters: 1 Old South Road, Nantucket, Massachusetts 02554 United States
- Circulation: 5,372 (as of 2018)
- Website: ack.net

The Inquirer and Mirror, also called The I&M, or "The Inky", is the weekly newspaper of record on the island of Nantucket, Massachusetts. It is published every Thursday morning and has been in continuous publication since 1821. The Inquirer and Mirror also publishes the magazine Nantucket Today. The I&M's domain name, ack.net, is derived from the IATA code of the island's only airport, ACK.

== History ==
The Inquirer and Mirror, began as The Inquirer in June 1821 at the height of the island's prominence in the global whaling industry. In 1865 its ownership acquired another newspaper, The Mirror, and the paper's were merged to form The Inquirer and Mirror.

In 1990, the newspaper was sold by Tom and Marie Giffin to Ottaway Newspapers, a subsidiary of Dow Jones & Company. In 2007 News Corp purchased Dow Jones and its assets, including Ottaway Newspapers. Dow Jones renamed Ottaway Newspapers to Local Media Group. In 2013, Local Media Group, which included The Inquirer and Mirror, was sold to GateHouse Media, which acquired Gannett in November 2019, retaining the name Gannett.

On November 1, 2020, The Inquirer and Mirror was sold to 41 North Media LLC. Management of paper remained unchanged.

== Awards ==
The Inquirer and Mirror has received many awards over the years and since 2000 has been named Newspaper of the Year multiple times by the New England Press Association (NEPA) and New England Newspaper and Press Association (NENPA) The New England Newspaper Association (NENA) and Newspaper of the Year by Suburban Newspapers of America (SNA).
