= 1934 Pulitzer Prize =

Awards for journalism and related fields

The following are the Pulitzer Prizes for 1934:

== Journalism awards ==
- Public Service:
  - Medford Mail Tribune (Oregon) for its campaign against unscrupulous politicians in Jackson County, Oregon.
- Reporting:
  - Royce Brier of the San Francisco Chronicle for his account of the lynching of the kidnappers, John M. Holmes and Thomas H. Thurmond in San Jose, California, on November 26, 1933, after they had been jailed for abducting Brooke Hart, a merchant's son.
  - Honorable mentions:
    - Eben A. Ayers, Andrew J. Clarke, and Edward J. Kelley of the Associated Press for "their vigilance and accuracy in covering the kidnapping of Margaret McMath at Harwichport, Massachusetts".
    - Edward J. Donohoe of the Times Leader (Wilkes-Barre, Pennsylvania) for "his able and convincing work in setting forth corruption in office on the part of members of the public-school boards in Luzerne County".
    - H. Ellwood Douglass of the St. Louis Post-Dispatch for "his accounts of the epidemic of encephalitis in St. Louis".
    - Meigs O. Frost of the New Orleans Times-Picayune for "his reporting of the case of Pearl Ledet, accused of causing a death in an automobile accident case".
    - Charles J. Truitt of the Philadelphia Evening Bulletin for "covering the district of Ocean City and Salisbury, Maryland, after the severest storm in the history of the eastern shore had severed all communications".
    - Frederick Woltman of the New York World-Telegram for "clear, exact, and understanding writing in reporting the status of various closed banks in suburban areas of New York after the national bank holiday".
- Correspondence:
  - Frederick T. Birchall of The New York Times for his correspondence from Europe.
  - Honorable mentions:
    - Harry Carr of the Los Angeles Times for his series of dispatches from Australia, Japan, China, the Philippines, and Europe.
    - John E. Elliott of the New York Herald-Tribune for his correspondence from Germany.
- Editorial Writing:
  - E. P. Chase of the Atlantic News-Telegraph (Iowa) for an editorial entitled, "Where Is Our Money?"
  - Honorable mentions:
    - James E. Lawrence of The Lincoln Star for "Iowa's Disgrace".
    - William R. Mathews of The Arizona Daily Star for "Some Aspects in the Administration's Program".
    - New York American (unknown writer) for "Freedom of the Press".
    - Geoffrey Parsons of the New York Herald-Tribune for "Strategic Gains".
    - E.H. Shaffer of the Albuquerque Tribune for "The Governor Sends Troops to Gallup".
    - Douglas W. Swiggett of the Milwaukee Journal for "Newspapers and the Code".
    - Casper S. Yost of the St. Louis Globe-Democrat for "The Freedom of the Press".
    - Osborn Zuber of The Birmingham News for "Why We Still Have Lynchings in the South".

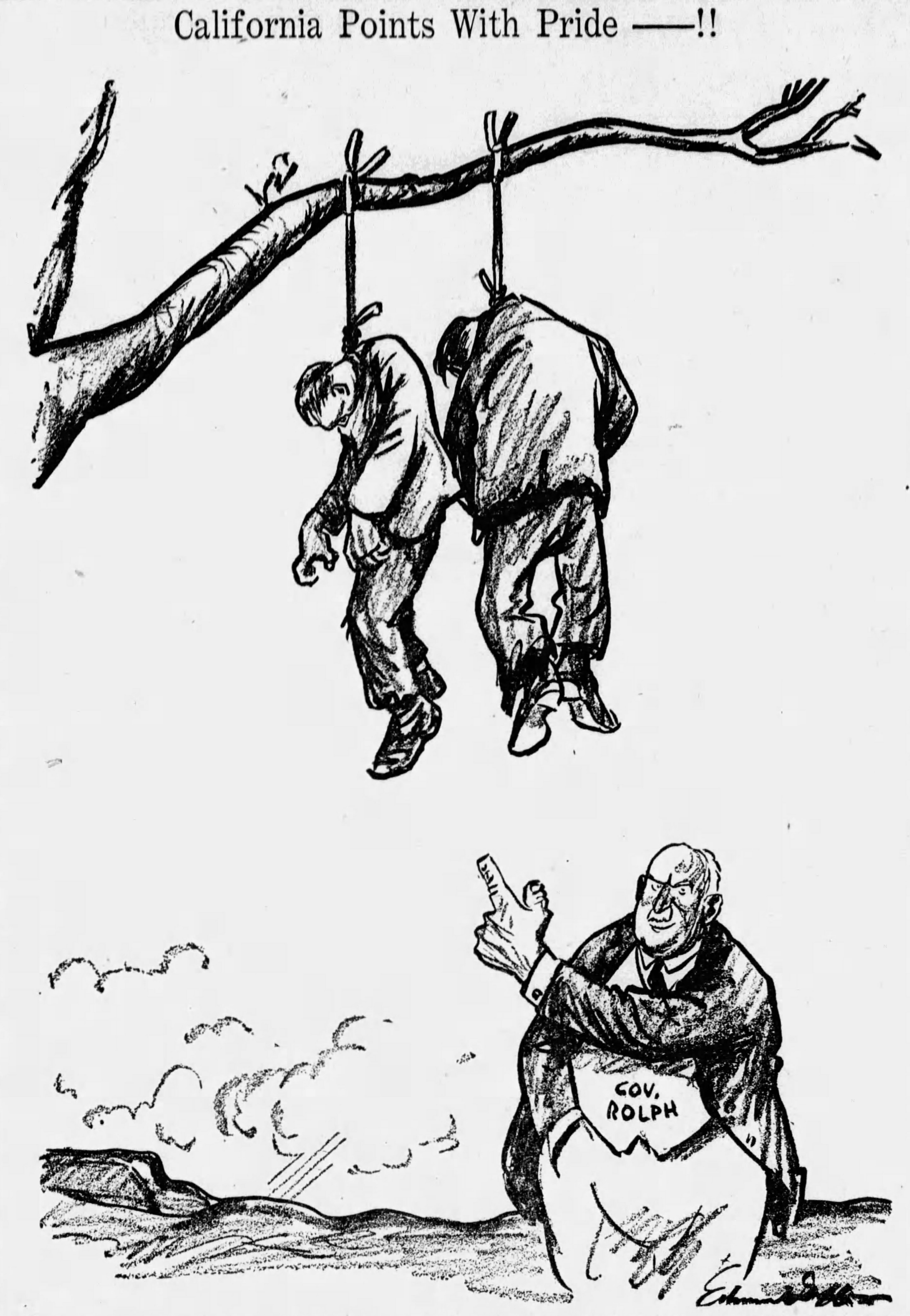
"California Points With Pride!", the prize-winning editorial cartoon.

- Editorial Cartooning:
  - Edmund Duffy of The Baltimore Sun for "California Points with Pride!"

== Letters and Drama Awards ==
- Novel:
  - Lamb in His Bosom by Caroline Miller (Harper)
- Drama:
  - Men in White by Sidney Kingsley (Covici Friede)
- History:
  - The People's Choice by Herbert Agar (Houghton)
- Biography or Autobiography:
  - John Hay by Tyler Dennett (Dodd)
- Poetry:
  - Collected Verse by Robert Hillyer (Alfred A. Knopf)
