= The Standard-Times (New Bedford, Massachusetts) =

Newspaper in New Bedford, Massachusetts

- The April 6, 2007, front page of The Standard-Times
- Type: Daily newspaper
- Format: Broadsheet
- Owner: USA Today Co.
- Editor: Lynne Sullivan
- Founded: February 4, 1850, as Daily Evening Standard
- Headquarters: 25 Elm Street, New Bedford, Massachusetts 02740, United States
- Circulation: 9,617 (as of 2018)
- ISSN: 0745-3574
- OCLC number: 22392728
- Website: southcoasttoday.com

The Standard-Times (and Sunday Standard-Times), based in New Bedford, Massachusetts, is the largest of three daily newspapers covering the South Coast of Massachusetts, along with The Herald News of Fall River and Taunton Daily Gazette of Taunton, Massachusetts.

Like the Cape Cod Times, which is the only larger newspaper in Southeastern Massachusetts, The Standard-Times is owned by USA Today Co. Together with the weekly newspapers of Hathaway Publishing, which also cover Fall River and several other suburban towns, The Standard-Times is part of the South Coast Media Group.

== Coverage ==
The Standard-Times's coverage area includes Acushnet, Dartmouth, Fairhaven, Fall River, Freetown, Lakeville, Marion, Mattapoisett, New Bedford, Rochester, Wareham, and Westport, Massachusetts.

The Standard-Times's main daily competitor is The Herald News of Fall River. Other rivals include The Boston Globe, the Taunton Daily Gazette and the Providence Journal.

== Circulation ==
The Standard-Times's print circulation has fallen over 30% since 2006. E-sales, while increasing, have not offset this decline in circulation. Daily (Monday through Saturday) circulation for The Standard-Times averaged 31,629 in mid-2006, down slightly from the 33,047 reported earlier that year. By September 2010, circulation had fallen sharply to 24,723 and 26,521 for daily and Sunday circulation respectively. As at May 2014, circulation had continued to fall, with daily print circulation down to 18,100 (20,482 Sunday circulation) and daily e-sales of 2,176 (836 Sunday circulation).

== Controversy ==
Publisher William T. Kennedy came under fire for New Bedford boosterism again in the 2000s, as critics alleged that his support for building a multimillion-dollar aquarium—he served on the board of directors for the waterfront "Oceanarium"—was skewing The Standard-Times's coverage of cost overruns and delays.

== History ==
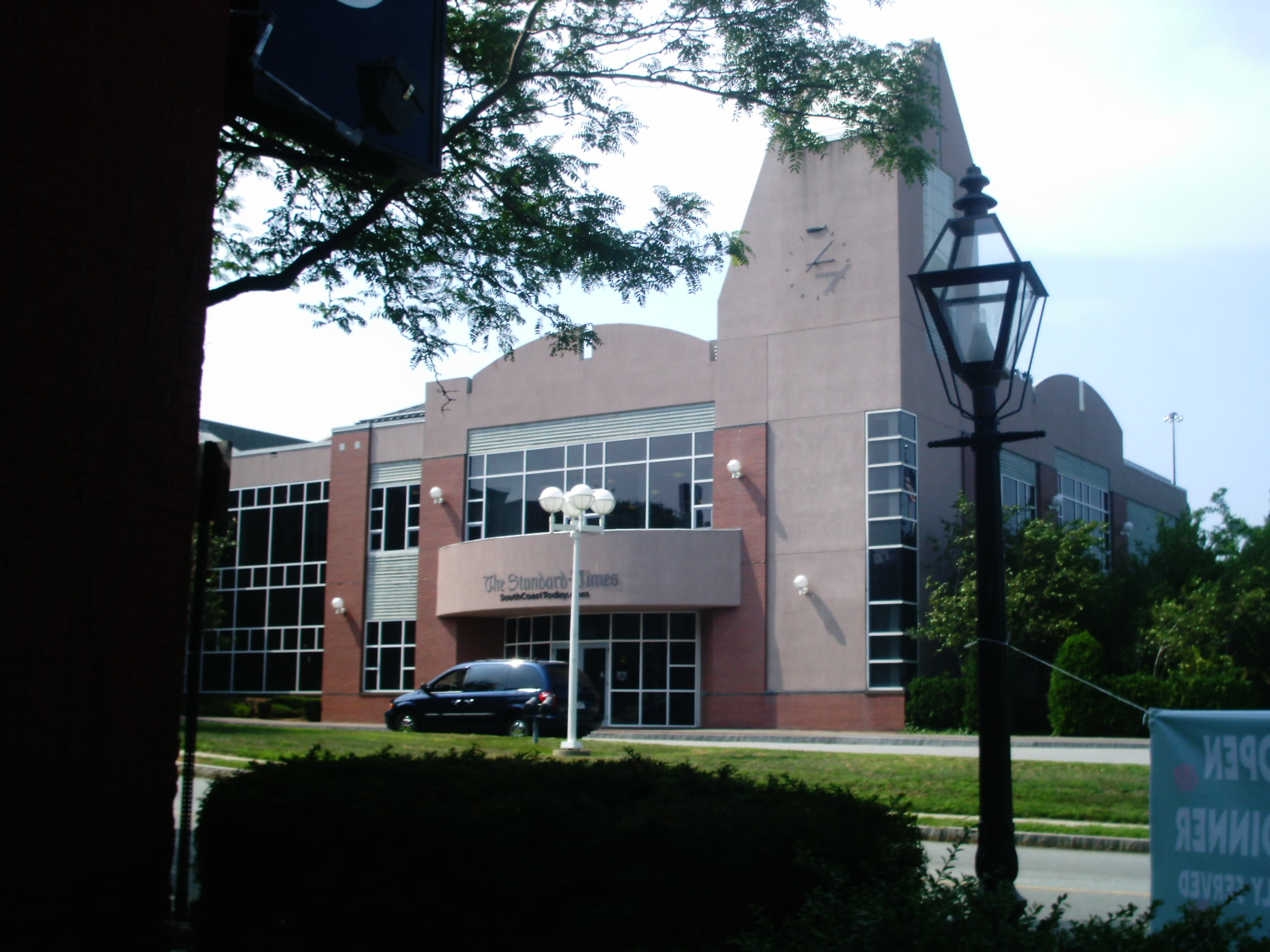
The current office building of The Standard-Times

The Standard-Times formed from the 1934 merger of The New Bedford Standard and The New Bedford Times. The Standard had been in operation since being founded as an evening newspaper in 1850.

The Cape Cod Times was originally known as The Cape Cod Standard-Times, an edition of the New Bedford paper. It split off in the 1970s.

O Jornal, a Portuguese-language weekly newspaper now owned by GateHouse Media, was purchased by The Standard-Times in 1993 from Kathy Castro and was sold in 1998 in a deal with two Fall River residents, Robert and James Karam, after Ottaway threatened to close it during staff cuts late in 1998. The weekly eventually was sold to Journal Register Company, then the owner of The Herald News of Fall River.

The use of the titles "Mr.," "Mrs.," "Ms." and "Miss" before the last names of people cited in the newspaper, still in use in sections other than sports at the start of 2007, is the legacy of longtime Standard-Times editor James M. Ragsdale, who died in 1994. Ragsdale was also credited with publishing drug and prostitution cases separately from other court news, in running features called Drug Watch and Prostitution Watch. The features included photos of drug and prostitution suspects taken during arraignment and published before their cases were adjudicated.

The front-page nameplate of The Standard-Times displays its home city's name in small print and trumpets a regional identity, "Serving the SouthCoast Community." It was The Standard-Times under Editor-In-Chief Ken Hartnett, that in the 1990s most loudly championed the name South Coast to designate the Fall River-New Bedford metropolitan area.

The "Standard-Times" has done well in regional news competitions for many years. Most recently it was named the New England Newspaper & Press Association Newspaper of the Year for both 2012 and 2013. It won NENPA's First Place Award for Local Election coverage for 2012, '13 and '14. It won the New England Associated Press News Executives Association's Deadline News Coverage First Place Award for its coverage of Tropical Storm Irene in 2012 and was NEAPNEA's First Place winner for its Overall Website in 2012.

Following a series of lay-offs between 2008 and 2009, the Standard-Times placed a paywall on its website on January 12, 2010. Unregistered visitors are able to view three articles per month, with free registration increasing the number of articles to 10 per month. Following the introduction of the paywall, site visitors fell.

=== Ownership ===
Amid a general decline in newspaper circulation, the ownership of the Standard-Times and its parent media groups has changed multiple times in the 21st century.

News Corp acquired The Standard-Times when it bought Dow Jones & Company, Dow Jones Local Media Group Inc.'s parent, for US$5 billion in late 2007. Rupert Murdoch, the head of News Corp., reportedly told investors before the deal that he would be "selling the local newspapers fairly quickly" after the Dow Jones purchase.

On September 4, 2013, News Corp announced that it would sell the Dow Jones Local Media Group to Newcastle Investment Corp.—an affiliate of Fortress Investment Group, for $87 million. The newspapers will be operated by Fortress subsidiary GateHouse Media, the owner of The Standard-Times' rival The Herald News. GateHouse Media has also expressed interest in purchasing fellow Standard-Times rival The Providence Journal. News Corp. CEO and former Wall Street Journal editor Robert James Thomson indicated that the newspapers were "not strategically consistent with the emerging portfolio" of the company. GateHouse in turn filed prepackaged Chapter 11 bankruptcy on September 27, 2013, to restructure its debt obligations in order to accommodate the acquisition.

== Former sister weeklies ==
The Standard-Times was associated with five weekly newspapers published by Hathaway Publishing Group: The Advocate, The Dartmouth Chronicle, The Fall River Spirit, The Spectator, and Middleboro Gazette. Following USA Today Co.'s acquisition of the newspaper group, all five discontinued their print editions and ceased publishing original content by 2021.

== See also ==
- List of newspapers in Massachusetts
