= VCCircle =

Media House in India

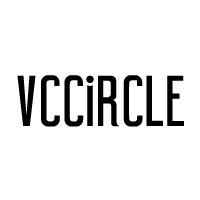
- Industry: Media
- Founded: 2005
- Founder: Sahad P.V
- Headquarters: Gurugram, India
- Parent: HT Media Limited
- Website: www.vccircle.com

VCCircle, founded in 2005, is an Indian information services group with a presence in online business news, data, events and training for private equity and venture capital fund managers, entrepreneurs, investment bankers, corporate executives and lawyers. It currently employs about 200 people and is owned by Mosaic Media Ventures Private Limited, a 100% subsidiary of HT Media Limited. Mosaic Media also owns other brands such as VCCEdge, Edge Insights and TechCircle. The company has offices in M3M Urbana, Sector 67, Gurugram; Delhi-National Capital Region, Mumbai, and Bengaluru. The company has also faced reports of repeated employee layoffs and workforce reductions. A 2021 Newslaundry report stated that HT Media had carried out repeated staff layoffs and raised concerns about the impact of these reductions on VCCircle. There were also reports of employee layoffs at VCCircle in February 2026. These reports have raised concerns regarding employee job security and the company's employment practices.The layoffs impacted both VCCircle and VCCEdge, with approximately 80 out of 100 employees being let go across departments, including Marketing, Product, Data, and Technology. The Business Head was also among those affected.

The company was acquired in 2015 by News Corp, and later by HT Media Limited in 2020. Leslie D'Monte joined as the Executive Editor of VCCircle and TechCircle in August, 2021. Currently, Vivek Sinha is the Executive Editor for both sites.

== History ==
VCCircle was founded in 2005 by Sahad P.V. as a blog focused on venture capital and private equity. The site expanded its coverage of Indian business to a larger audience of entrepreneurs, corporate executives, investors, legal professionals and bankers. VCCircle offers insight and opinion on various business happenings. Since its acquisition by HT Media Limited, VCCircle started working alongside Mint, the second largest business daily in India. The company routinely publishes exclusive articles on the venture capital and the private equity community on its website. Some of these articles are also published in the Mint.

In May 2012, VCCircle.com introduced a paywall. It is the first business news website in India to introduce a paywall. VCCircle announced an award in 2012 which recognised the best performing PE/VC-backed companies in various sectors and also law firms and investment banks who have done the maximum number of deals in a given year.

The second edition of awards was held in February 2013. VCCircle Network got the DEMO conference to start an event in India. The event was held on 20 and 21 March 2013 in Bengaluru.

The third edition of VCCircle Awards was held in February 2014.

The fourth edition of VCCircle Awards was held in February 2015. The VCCircle Network was acquired by News Corp in March 2015. In 2020, HT Media took over as the owner of VCCircle from News Corp.
