= Llewellyn Banks =

- Banks in the mid 1920s
- Born: August 15, 1870; Catawba Island, Ohio
- Died: September 21, 1945 (aged 75); Oregon State Penitentiary, Salem, Oregon
- Education: University of Oregon
- Spouse(s): Florence Ethelia Banks (m. 1892), Edith Robertine Ward
- Children: Geraldyn, Ruth

Llewellyn Alba Banks was an American orchardist and newspaper publisher. In the 1930s, his opinion columns in his newspaper, the Medford Daily News, engendered a populist movement called the Good Government Congress, which briefly controlled the government in Jackson County, Oregon. The movement began to unravel due to a ballot fraud scandal that culminated when Banks shot and killed a sheriff's deputy who attempted to arrest him. Banks was convicted of murder and died in prison.

== Early life and orchardist career ==
Banks was born in northern Ohio in 1870 and after graduating high school, went to work for his brother's fruit business, eventually becoming president of the business. He married Florence Ethelia Banks in 1892. In 1909, following the failure of the fruit business, he relocated to Riverside, California, and established a successful citrus business. After a falling out with the Riverside growers’ cooperative, Banks sold his orchards and moved to Medford, Oregon with his second wife, Edith, and their daughter, Ruth, where he established a pear orchard.

== Publishing career ==
As had happened in California, Banks clashed with the power structure led by other orchardists in southern Oregon, which, in his view, was unfair to smaller operations like his. In 1929, in an effort to increase his political influence, he acquired a newspaper, the Medford Daily News, where as publisher, he wrote a daily column, "Once in a While." Banks' columns had a strong populist tone that resonated with its readers. With the onset of the Great Depression later that year, the columns grew increasingly strident and were often antisemitic.

Banks teamed up with Earl Fehl, a perennial candidate for mayor of Medford who published another Medford newspaper, the Pacific Record Herald. Fehl's paper had labeled the local power structure as a corrupt "Gang" that conspired against the working class. In 1930, both men ran for public office, with Fehl making his fifth attempt to be elected mayor of Medford, and Banks challenging incumbent Oregon senator Charles McNary as an Independent in the 1930 United States Senate election in Oregon. While Banks finished a distant third statewide, he garnered 40% of the vote in his home county, Jackson, while Fehl lost by only 14 votes out of 3,240 cast.

== Good Government Congress ==
Sensing they were on the verge of greater success, Banks and Fehl created a movement they named the Good Government Congress (GGC), which quickly attracted members, largely working-class, from around Medford and across southern Oregon, with the goal of overturning the established political structure and returning power to the people. For protection and support, Banks employed a quasi-military group of unemployed and disaffected young men from rural parts of Jackson County who styled themselves as the "Green Springs Mountain Boys" and intimidated local residents who didn't share their devotion to Banks and the GGC.

In 1932, the GGC put up candidates for local offices in both parties. Fehl won the Republican primary for county judge, while the GGC candidate for sheriff, Gordon Schermerhorn, won the Democratic primary. In the general election of 1932, Fehl and Schermerhorn were apparently victorious again. While Banks and Fehl celebrated their victories and takeover of key parts of city and county government, allegations of ballot fraud led incumbent sheriff Ralph Jennings (who had lost by fewer than 100 votes) to call for a recount. The process dragged on, and once Fehl was sworn in as judge, he refused to take action. Jennings took his complaint to the state of Oregon, which began an investigation and ordered a recount.

== Ballot fraud and murder ==
On February 20, 1933, the night before the scheduled recount, the Good Government Congress held a rally at the county courthouse. Some members broke into the courthouse and stole ballot pouches. The next day, some ballots were found partially burned and others in the Rogue River. Oregon State Police soon indicted GGC leaders, including Banks, who responded by holding even more strident rallies in which he asserted that he would not go quietly. On March 16, local and state police arrived at Banks' home to arrest him. As they opened the door, Banks fired his hunting rifle at Medford constable George Prescott, killing him instantly. Banks surrendered, confident he would be acquitted for defending his home.

Banks and his wife Edith, who had answered the door, were both charged with first-degree murder. The trial began on May 3, and, due to concerns about finding an impartial jury in Medford, was held in Eugene, 150 miles away. Llewellyn Banks pleaded innocent by reason of temporary insanity brought on by fears of threats to his life. On May 21, the jury acquitted Edith and found Llewellyn guilty of second-degree murder. He was sentenced to life in prison.

== After conviction ==
Banks' crime led most GGC members to abandon the organization, and by the mid-1930s, the group had disappeared. Coverage of the scandal as reported by the Medford Mail Tribune resulted in the paper being awarded the 1934 Pulitzer Prize for Public Service.

While in prison, Banks wrote a memoir titled Weighed in the Balance, in which he justified his actions. He died in prison in 1945.
