= The People's Choice (Agar book) =

The People's Choice: From Washington to Harding; A Study in Democracy is a book by historian Herbert Agar, published by Houghton Mifflin, 1933. It won the 1934 Pulitzer Prize for History.
