= Carole Coleman =

Irish journalist

- Born: September 1966 (age 59–60); Carrick-on-Shannon, County Leitrim, Ireland
- Education: Dublin Institute of Technology
- Occupation: Journalist
- Employer: University of Galway

Carole Coleman (born September 1966) is an Irish journalist. Originally from Carrick-on-Shannon, County Leitrim, she is a former Washington Correspondent for RTÉ. She is a journalism graduate of the Dublin Institute of Technology (DIT) and presently teaches journalism at the University of Galway.

== Interviews ==
Coleman is best known in the U.S. for a probing television interview of President George W. Bush just before his official visit to Ireland in the summer of 2004.

THE PRESIDENT: ... Look, Saddam Hussein had used weapons of mass destruction against his own people, against the neighborhood. He was a brutal dictator who posed a threat -- such a threat that the United Nations voted unanimously to say, Mr. Saddam Hussein --

Q Indeed, Mr. President, but you didn't find the weapons of mass destruction.

THE PRESIDENT: Let me finish. Let me finish. May I finish?

He said -- the United Nations said, disarm or face serious consequences. That's what the United Nations said. And guess what? He didn't disarm. He didn't disclose his arms. And, therefore, he faced serious consequences. But we have found a capacity for him to make a weapon. See, he had the capacity to make weapons. He was dangerous. And no one can argue that the world is better off with Saddam -- if Saddam Hussein were in power.

Q But, Mr. President, the world is a more dangerous place today. I don't know whether you can see that or not.

THE PRESIDENT: Why do you say that?

Q There are terrorist bombings every single day. It's now a daily event. It wasn't like that two years ago.

The interview, for which questions were approved by the White House press office, led to complaints by President Bush and his press officers for the "disrespectful" manner of Coleman, who interrupted the President several times, and the cancellation of a Laura Bush interview with RTÉ.

The White House complained to the Irish Embassy about the interview. An Irish government spokesman commented that "within Government, there was an acknowledgment that the interview lacked respect." RTÉ, however, stated it "totally stands over the conduct of the interview and Carole's journalism."

Coleman stated that she resorted to interrupting the President because she was afraid his stock answers would eat up all time she had for interview: "It was a filibuster of sorts. If I didn’t challenge him, the interview would be a wasted opportunity". She also said she was surprised by the White House staff's reaction to the interview, but that she had no regrets:

Clearly the White House had thought they would be dealing with an Irish "cailin" bowled over by the opportunity to interview the Bushes

...

Had I been fair? Should I just have been more deferential to George Bush? I felt that I had simply done my job and shuddered at the thought of the backlash I would surely have faced in Ireland had I not challenged the president on matters that had changed the way America was viewed around the world.

== Books ==
In October 2005, Coleman published Alleluia America! An Irish Journalist in Bush Country (The Liffey Press). The book begins with an account of her interview with President GW Bush and its aftermath. It goes on to describe Coleman's travels through regions of the U.S. that voted for Bush in 2004 and the people she met along the way. The Bush/Coleman interview has been studied using a Critical Discourse Analysis methodology.

In January 2009, Coleman published The Battle for the White House ... and the Soul of America (The Liffey Press), an account of the 2008 US presidential election.

In October 2021, Coleman published News from Under a Coat Stand ... A Diary March–June 2020 (Orla Kelly Publishing), an international and personal account of Covid's first 100 days.

Media offices
Preceded by Mark Little	RTÉ News Washington Correspondent; 2001-2004	Succeeded by Robert Shortt
