= The Daily Star (Oneonta) =

US newspaper, founded 1896

- Type: Daily newspaper
- Format: Broadsheet
- Owner: Community Newspaper Holdings Inc.
- Publisher: Valerie Secor
- Founded: 1896
- Language: English
- Headquarters: 102 Chestnut Street, Oneonta, New York 13820 U.S.
- Circulation: 4,000 (as of March 2024)
- Website: www.thedailystar.com

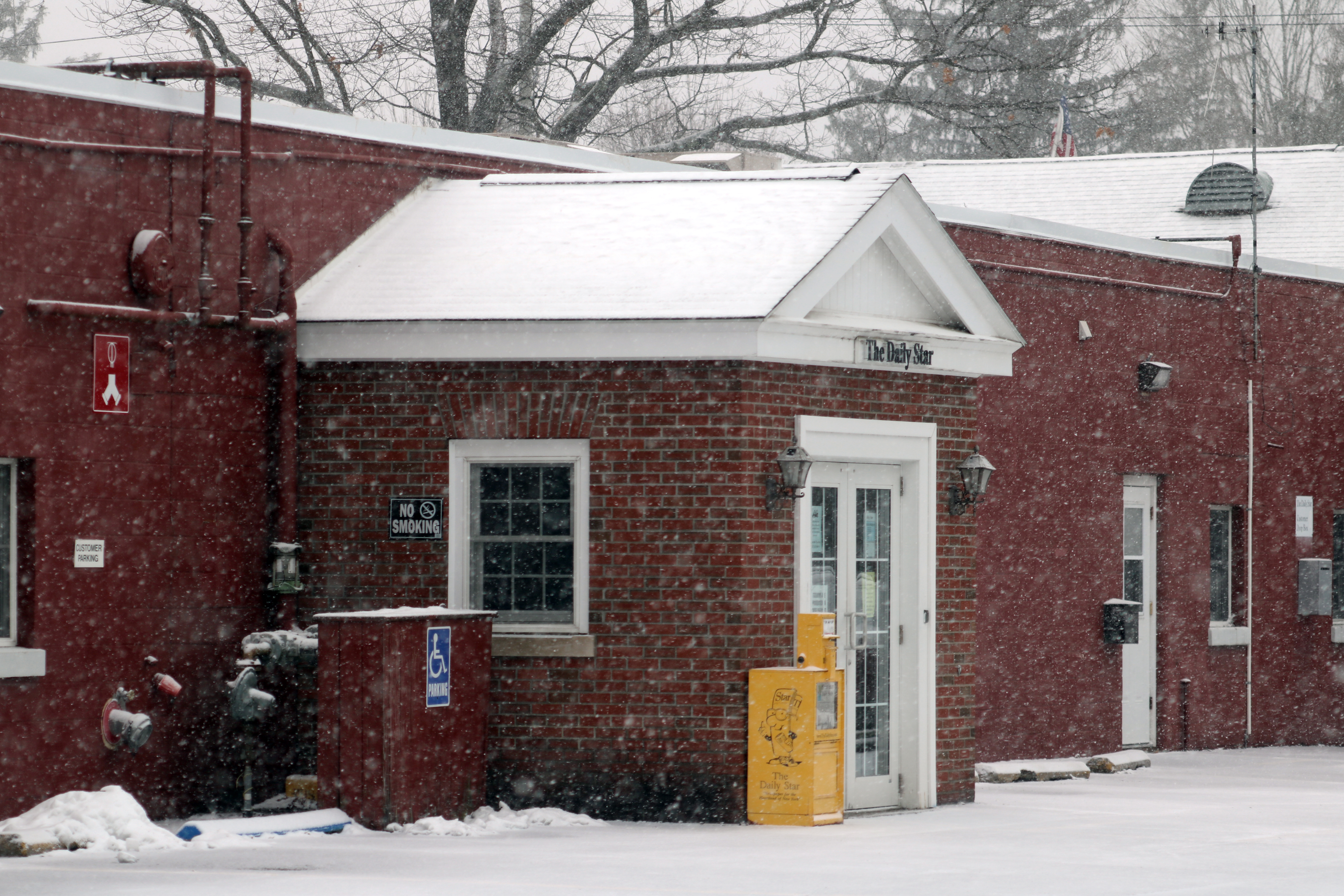
The Daily Star building, Oneonta, New York

The Daily Star is a daily newspaper in Oneonta, New York, United States. It is owned by Community Newspaper Holdings Inc. (CNHI).

The Daily Star also publishes a weekly newspaper, the Cooperstown Crier, serving Oneonta and the nearby (22 miles (35 km)) town of Cooperstown.

CNHI bought The Daily Star and Cooperstown Crier in late 2006 from Ottaway Community Newspapers, a division of Dow Jones & Company.

Originally named the Oneonta Star, it was a weekly newspaper when purchased by James H. Ottaway Sr. in 1944; after adding it to his Ottaway Community Newspapers group, he changed the paper to a daily, complete with the adjustment to its present name.

As of 1932, the Oneonata Star operation had expanded the use of its publishing equipment to create the Otsego Publishing Company; it published the small run History and Genealogy of the Ancestors and Some Descendants of Stukely Westcott, written by Roscoe L. Whitman.

Beginning January 1, 2026, the print edition was reduced to three days per week (Tuesday, Thursday and Saturday) from the previous five days per week schedule (Tuesday to Saturday).
