= John G. Agar (lawyer) =

American lawyer

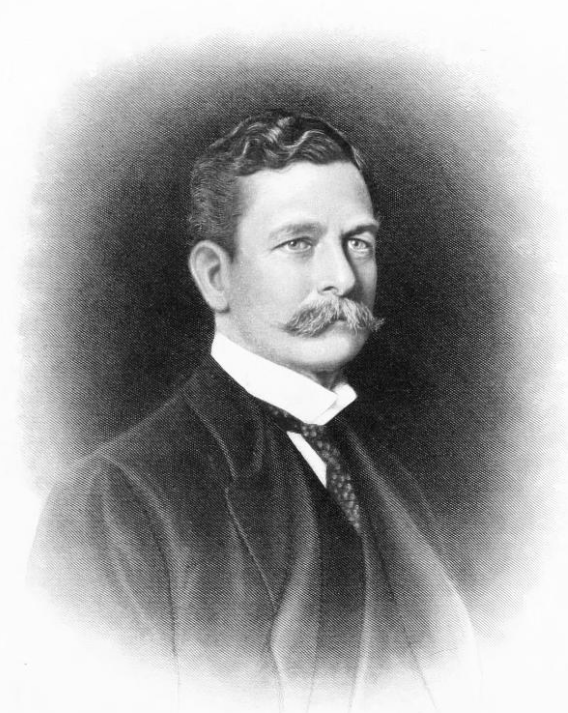
- Born: John Giraud Agar; June 3, 1856; New Orleans, Louisiana
- Died: September 20, 1935 (aged 79); Premium Point, New York
- Burial place: Woodlawn Cemetery
- Education: Georgetown University; Columbia College Law School
- Occupations: Lawyer, politician
- Spouse: Agnes Louis Macdonough (m. 1892)
- Children: 5, including Herbert Agar

John Giraud Agar (June 3, 1856 – September 20, 1935) was a prominent New York lawyer and a leader of the reform political movement.

== Early life and education ==
Agar was born in New Orleans on June 3, 1856, to William Agar and Theresa Price. In 1876, he graduated with a B.A. from the Georgetown University. Followed by a Masters of Arts in 1888 and a Doctor of Philosophy in 1889, and a Doctor of Laws in 1910. In 1878, he attended the Columbia College Law School and graduated in 1880. On February 28, 1892, he married Agnes Louis Macdonough. Together, they had five children including Herbert Agar, winner of the Pulitzer Prize for History. His son and namesake John G. Agar Jr. died in World War I in October 1918 at St. Mihiel, France.

== Career ==
In 1881, Agar was appointed Assistant Attorney for the Southern District New York by President Garfield. He resigned in 1882 to become a senior member of Agar, Ely, and Fulton, a role he held until his death.

In 1896, he was named a school commissioner on the New York City Board of Education and is credited for removing education from politics and obtaining better funding for public schools. He resigned as school commissioner in 1899, after faulting Tammany Hall for not releasing the funds raised for building and improving schools; removing the requirement for teachers to hold a license; and giving more power to those in politics to choose principals that aligned with their beliefs rather than the best for the job. Due to these defects, Agar declared he could not accomplish anything good for the public school system. After his resignation, Agar proposed to fix these defects by making the Board of Education separate from the political governance of the city; control over finances through a school tax that would fund public schools; and limit the number of school Commissioners to increase their control of funds and responsibilities.

From 1906 to 1908, he was a member of the Municipal Art Society (MAS) and president of the Reform Club. In 1908, and 1909, he was president of MAS followed by service as the third president of the National Arts Club from 1910 - 1932. In 1913, Agar delivered a speech at the 8th annual Fifty Books of the Year Exhibition at the National Arts Club, where he announced the founding of the American Institute of Graphic Arts. The organization was to promote and encourage those in the graphic arts to exchange views, publish books and periodicals, hold exhibitions and lectures, and promote higher education in the arts. In 1924, he was award the AIGA Medal.

In 1916, he was appointed Knight of the Order of St Gregory by Pope Benedict XV and was a trustee of St. Patrick's Cathedral. And in 1928, he became president of the Arts Council of New York City.

In 1926, Agar successfully petitioned the New York Court of Appeals to raise the requirements for admission to the bar. Agar produced a report with the Committee on Character that described ignorance and unfitness among a large population of the candidates for the bar and recommended that at least two years in college in addition to three years in a recognized law school be required.

== Death ==
Agar died September 20, 1935, in Premium Point, New Rochelle, New York, and was buried in Woodlawn Cemetery.
