= The Standard-Times =

The Standard-Times, The Standard Times, or Standard-Times may refer to:

- The Standard-Times (New Bedford, Massachusetts), newspaper based in New Bedford, Massachusetts
- The Standard Times (North Kingstown), newspaper based in North Kingstown, Rhode Island
- San Angelo Standard-Times, newspaper based in San Angelo, Texas
