= Herbert Agar =

American journalist and historian (1897–1980)

- Agar in the 1940s
- Born: 29 September 1897; New Rochelle, New York, U.S.
- Died: 24 November 1980 (aged 83); Sussex, U.K.
- Education: Columbia University; Princeton University
- Occupation: Historian

Herbert Sebastian Agar (29 September 1897 – 24 November 1980) was an American journalist and historian, and an editor of the Louisville Courier-Journal.

== Early life and education ==
Herbert Sebastian Agar was born September 29, 1897, in New Rochelle, New York to John G. Agar and Agnes Louis Macdonough. He graduated from Columbia University in 1919, where he was a member of the Philolexian Society, and received his master's degree from Princeton University in 1922 and Ph.D. in 1924.

== Career ==
Agar won the Pulitzer Prize for History in 1934 for his 1933 book The People's Choice, a critical look at the American presidency. Agar was associated with the Southern Agrarians and edited, with Allen Tate, Who Owns America? (1936). He was also a strong proponent of an Americanized version of the British distributist socioeconomic system.

Agar's 1950 book The Price of Union was one of John F. Kennedy's favorite books, and he kept a copy of it on his desk. A passage from The Price of Union about an act of courage by John Quincy Adams gave Kennedy the idea of writing an article about senatorial courage. He showed the passage to his speechwriter Ted Sorensen and asked him to see if he could find some more examples. This Sorensen did, and eventually they had enough for a book, the Pulitzer Prize-winning Profiles in Courage (1956).

== Personal life and death ==
=== Marriages ===
On February 6, 1918, in Manhattan, Agar married Adeline Mitchell Scott (1886–1968), daughter of American vertebrate paleontologist William Berryman Scott (1858–1947). Adeline filed for divorce on August 6, 1932, in Mercer County, New Jersey.

On April 11, 1933, in London, Agar married Eleanor Carroll Chilton (1898–1949), a novelist and poet, and the daughter of William Edwin Chilton (1857–1939), U.S. senator from West Virginia (1911–1917). They were divorced on May 25, 1945, in West Palm Beach. Adeline Scott was a second cousin twice removed of Emily Post’s husband, Edwin Main Van Zo Post (1870–1928).

On June 8, 1945, Agar married Barbara Wallace (née Barbara Lutyens; 1898–1981), daughter of the architect Sir Edwin Lutyens (1869–1944) and widow (and second wife) of Euan Wallace (1892–1941), former British Minister of Transport.

=== Death ===
Agar died on November 24, 1980, in Sussex, England, where he had lived since World War II.

== Works ==
- Milton and Plato (1928)
- The People's Choice: From Washington to Harding — A Study in Democracy (1933) ISBN 978-0-9665734-0-4
- Land of the Free (1935)
- Who Owns America? A New Declaration of Independence (contributor and co-editor with Allen Tate) (1936) ISBN 978-1-882926-37-4
- The Pursuit of Happiness: The Story of American Democracy (1938)
- A Time for Greatness (1942)
- The Price of Union: The Influence of the American Temper on the Course of History (1950)
- Abraham Lincoln (1952)
- The Unquiet Years: U.S.A. 1945–1955 (1957)
- The Price of Power: America Since 1945 (1957) ISBN 978-0-226-00937-7
- The Saving Remnant: An Account of Jewish Survival Since 1914 (1960)
- The Perils of Democracy (1965)
- The Darkest Year: Britain Alone, June 1940 - June 1941 (1972)

== Bibliography ==
=== References ===
- Agar, Herbert (30 November 1949). The Price of Union. Boston: Houghton Mifflin Company. LCCN 50-6381; OCLC 785562 (all editions).
1. Via Internet Archive (Osmania University).
- ""John G. Agar, 79, Lawyer, Is Dead; Ex-Member of Westchester County Park Board Once a Reform Leader Here"". The New York Times. Vol. 85, no. 28364 (Late City ed.). September 21, 1935. p. 15 – via TimesMachine.
- "Comdr. Herbert Agar to Marry in London". Vol. 94, no. 31913 (Late City ed.). June 9, 1945. p. 17. ISSN 0362-4331 (print), ISSN 1553-8095 (online); OCLC 1645522 (all editions).
1. "Via TimesMachine". The New York Times.
2. "Pdf via TimesMachine". The New York Times.
3. "Via TimesMachine permalink". The New York Times.
- ""Herbert Agar Dies; Author and Editor; Wrote Prolifically on the American Democratic Heritage – on Pulitzer Prize in History a Champion of Democratic Ideals Correspondent and Columnist"". The New York Times. Vol. 130, no. 44778 (Late City ed.). November 25, 1980. p. 23 (section D) (digital image 87) – via TimesMachine.
- Sidey, Hugh Swanson (March 1961). "The President's Reading Habits – He Eats Up News, Books at 1,200 Words a Minute". Life. Vol. 50, no. 11. pp. 55–56, 59–60 – via Google Books. ISSN 0024-3019.
- Trenton Evening Times (August 27, 1932). Princeton Woman Asks for Divorce. Vol. 51, no. 203. p. 1 (column 4, bottom).
1. Via Newspapers.com.
