= Cape Cod Times =

Daily newspaper in Hyannis, Massachusetts

- Cape Cod Times front page
- Type: Daily newspaper
- Format: Broadsheet
- Owner: USA Today Co.
- Publisher: Peter Meyer
- Editor: Anne Brennan
- Founded: 1936
- Political alignment: Unaffiliated
- Language: English
- Headquarters: 319 Main Street, Hyannis, Massachusetts 02601, United States
- Circulation: 19,925 (as of 2018)
- ISSN: 0747-1467
- Website: www.capecodonline.com

The Cape Cod Times is a broadsheet daily newspaper serving Barnstable County, Massachusetts, United States, which encompasses 15 towns on Cape Cod with a year-round population of about 230,000 and a circulation of about 20,000. It is owned by USA Today Co.

== History ==
The paper was first published by businessman J.P. Dunn and Basil Brewer on October 19, 1936, as the Cape Cod Standard-Times, and was distributed jointly on the Cape with The New Bedford Standard-Times until the end of 1970. It was first published as an independent daily for Cape Cod on January 1, 1971, and renamed the Cape Cod Times from September 2, 1975.

The first issues were printed in a converted automobile dealer's garage on Elm Street in Hyannis, now a bus garage. Less than a year after the paper made its debut, plans were announced for the construction of a building at 319 Main Street, which has remained the Times home since early 1938.

As the newspapers entered the late 1960s, it became evident that the historic piggy-back distribution arrangement with the New Bedford paper had outlived its usefulness, due to the population growth of Cape Cod. In 1970, the decision was made to break away and the new daily Cape Cod Standard-Times was born.

In 1975, to dispel any impression of still being an offshoot of the New Bedford paper, the Cape Cod paper was renamed the Cape Cod Times.

News Corp. acquired the Times when it bought Dow Jones & Company (which itself had purchased Ottaway in 1970) for US$5 billion in late 2007. Rupert Murdoch, the head of News Corp., reportedly told investors before the deal that he would be "selling the local newspapers fairly quickly" after the Dow Jones purchase.

On September 4, 2013, News Corp announced that it would sell the Dow Jones Local Media Group to Newcastle Investment Corp.—an affiliate of Fortress Investment Group, for $87 million. The newspapers were operated by GateHouse Media, a newspaper group owned by Fortress. News Corp. CEO and former Wall Street Journal editor Robert James Thomson indicated that the newspapers were "not strategically consistent with the emerging portfolio" of the company. GateHouse in turn filed prepackaged Chapter 11 bankruptcy on September 27, 2013, to restructure its debt obligations in order to accommodate the acquisition.

In November 2019, GateHouse, which then owned 154 dailies in 39 states, merged with Gannett, the owner of more than 100 daily community newspapers as well as USA Today. Gannett was chosen as the brand name for the merged holding companies, which replaced Gatehouse as the largest corporate owner of U.S. newspapers. The merger required a $1.8 billion loan to pay off the financial obligations of GateHouse's owner, New Media Investment Group. The more than $300 million annual debt service explains Gannett's subsequent severe and progressive reduction in the newsroom budgets of the newspapers it owned. Gannett could not simultaneously pay off its debt, reward its shareholders, and adequately support its newsrooms. The Cape Cod Times became a victim of the merger.

In March 2020, Gannett sold the landmark Times headquarters building at 319 Main Street in Hyannis. The Times then leased space in the building it had owned for more than 80 years. The sale was consistent with Gannett's practice of selling capital assets of newspapers it owned to generate funds to pay off its huge merger-enabling loan from Apollo Global Management.

== Today's Times ==
In 1997, the paper published a series titled "Broken Trust," written by two Times reporters who spent five months tracking down details of contamination of Cape Cod's aquifer by extensive underground pollution originating at Joint Base Cape Cod. The six-part series caught the attention of the Environmental Protection Agency, which suspended the use of live explosives, propellants, flares, and lead bullets on the military reservation – the first time in American history that the EPA imposed any restrictions on a branch of the U.S. military.

In 2007, the Suburban Newspapers of America named the Cape Cod Times "Newspaper of the Year," with the American Press Institute judging the Times to be "one of the country's elite newspapers." The following year (2008), the New England Press Association named the Times "Newspaper of the Year."

In November 2019, Pronovost resigned as executive editor. He went on to become communications director at Saint Anselm College.

Five months later, in April 2020, Gannett announced layoffs in the newsroom, including long-established and popular reporters. On May 24, 2020, further budgetary constraints resulted in the newspaper ending its editorial page; Anne Brennan, Editor-in-Chief, said that the paper would neither take editorial positions or endorse politicians. The newsroom staff has shrunk by half over 6 years – from 32 to 15 between 2016 and 2022.

In March 2022, the Cape Cod Times stopped publishing a print edition on Saturdays, a move that was part of Gannett's eliminating Saturday print editions at half of the more than 250 daily U.S. newspapers it owned.

In June 2022, the Cape Cod Times followed Gannett's lead regarding opinion pieces and reduced its opinion content still further. The Times now limits publication of letters to the editor and op-ed pieces to the Saturday and Sunday editions.

== See also ==
- List of newspapers in Massachusetts
