= Middleboro Gazette =

Newspaper in Massachusetts, USA

- Type: Weekly newspaper
- Format: Broadsheet
- Owner: USA Today Co.
- Publisher: Warren Hathaway (emeritus)
- Editor: Jon Haglof
- Founded: 1852
- Ceased publication: 2021
- Language: English
- Website: gazettenewsonline.com

The Middleboro Gazette was a weekly newspaper founded in 1852. Based in Middleborough, Massachusetts, its coverage area included Lakeville, Middleboro, and occasionally Freetown. The newspaper ceased publishing original stories and discontinued its print edition in 2021.
