= Mark Little (journalist) =

Irish journalist, television presenter and author

Mark Richard Little
- Born: Dublin, Ireland
- Education: Trinity College Dublin
- Occupation: Journalist
- Notable credit: Prime Time
- Spouse: Tara Peterman

Mark Little is an Irish journalist, television presenter and author. He presented Prime Time for RTÉ until December 2009. He took a year of leave of absence from RTÉ to pursue a project centered on digital media and global journalism. He launched the project in April 2010, called Storyful. which he sold to News International in 2013. In 2015 he joined Twitter, first as vice president of media and partnerships for Twitter in Europe and later becoming managing director of Twitter in Ireland. He resigned from the position in 2016.

== Early life and education ==
Little was born in Dublin and lived in Malahide, County Dublin, later moving to Oughterard, County Galway.

He studied Economic and Social Studies at Trinity College Dublin for 5 years, and took his BA degree in 1997. During college, he served as president of the Students' Union for a year, and was a member of the Labour Party.

== Career ==
Little began his career in journalism working for The Sunday Business Post. He was then hired as a TV reporter for RTÉ News and Current Affairs in 1991, after answering a newspaper advertisement. He became RTÉ's first Washington Correspondent in 1995. He remained there until 2001, before returning to Dublin to become Foreign Affairs Correspondent. His Washington post was filled by Carole Coleman. In 2001 he won TV Journalist of the Year in the ESB National Media Awards.

In his time with RTÉ, he has met such US politicians as Bill Clinton, Hillary Clinton and Barack Obama. He presented the documentary programme Who's Afraid of Islam? in 2006. He has also reported from disaster and conflict areas such as, Iraq, Europe, Asia, Africa and the Americas. In 2008, he presented American Dream: Dead or Alive on RTÉ One.

Little often presented RTÉ News specials such as Government budgets and elections.

In 2002, he joined RTÉ's flagship current affairs programme Prime Time, which he co-presented with Miriam O'Callaghan. In November 2009, he announced his desire to take a leave of absence from RTÉ for the period of a year. His reason was to pursue a project combining digital media and global journalism. On 17 December 2009, he presented his final Prime Time. This being a field he has experience in through his work on Twitter. On 12 April 2010, his new project, storyful.com, was launched. He developed the website along with other web journalists.

In 2016, Little resigned from Twitter and started Neva Labs, which was launched in 2018 as Kinzen. On October 5, 2022, Spotify announced it had acquired Kinzen for an undisclosed amount.

== Personal life ==
In his early 20s, Little was in a relationship with Maxine Brady, the then president of the Union of Students in Ireland. His first child, a daughter, Sorcha, was born when Little was 21.

As of December 2009, Little was married to Tara Peterman, an American who worked with him on Prime Time, they had two children, Daisy and Tommy, and lived in Dalkey, County Dublin.

Media offices
Preceded by New position	RTÉ News Washington Correspondent; 1995-2001	Succeeded by Carole Coleman
