= GateHouse Media =

American media company (1998–2019)

GateHouse Media, Inc.
- Type: Subsidiary
- Industry: News media
- Predecessor: Liberty Group Publishing
- Founded: 1998; 28 years ago
- Founder: Kenneth L. Serota
- Defunct: November 19, 2019; 6 years ago
- Fate: Subsumed into Gannett after takeover GateHouse was the nominal survivor, but operations continued under the Gannett name rather than GateHouse name
- Successor: Gannett
- Headquarters: Perinton, New York (Note: While its mail is delivered from the Pittsford, NY 14534 post office, GateHouse's headquarters lie about a third of a mile east of the eastern border of Pittsford, New York.)
- Area served: United States
- Key people: Michael E. Reed, Chairman/CEO Kirk Davis, operating company CEO; Paul Ameden, CIO; Bill Church, Senior VP News; Polly Grunfeld Sack, SVP / General Counsel
- Products: 130 daily newspapers 640 community publications 540 local market websites
- Parent: New Media Investment Group
- Website: gatehousemedia.com (defunct)

GateHouse Media Inc. was an American publisher of locally based print and digital media. It published 144 daily newspapers, 684 community publications, and over 569 local-market websites in 38 states. Its parent company, New Media Investment Group, acquired Gannett in 2019, with the combined company using the Gannett name and maintaining its headquarters in Virginia. In 2015, Gannett spun off its publishing holdings into a standalone company, and renamed that company USA Today Co. in 2025.

== Early history ==
=== Liberty Group Publishing ===
Liberty Group Publishing was formed in 1998 when Kenneth L. Serota, a former Hollinger International attorney with backing from Leonard Green & Partners, bought 160 community newspapers from Hollinger. Headquartered in Downers Grove, Illinois, Liberty then expanded the network increasing the total newspapers to 330 by 2000. Faced with problems, it downsized to 270 by June 2005.

=== GateHouse Media ===
In June 2005, Fortress Investment Group bought Liberty for $527 million. Fortress expanded it to 75 dailies, 231 weeklies, 117 shoppers, and 230 websites. It was renamed GateHouse and its headquarters moved to suburban Rochester, New York, in April 2006. In October 2006, GateHouse had its IPO with Fortress maintaining 60% ownership. On October 23, 2007, GateHouse announced the purchase of 14 daily newspapers and other publications from Morris Communications.

The company received notification from the New York Stock Exchange (NYSE) on August 21, 2008, that it had fallen below the NYSE's continued listing standards for average global market capitalization over a consecutive 30-trading-day period of not less than $75 million and $1.00 average closing price, and had submitted a business plan to the NYSE Regulation for coming back into compliance for continued listing. The company has been in communication with the NYSE regarding its noncompliance with continued listing standards, but was unsuccessful in its efforts to avoid suspension and delisting.

== Bankruptcy, bailout and restructuring ==
On September 4, 2013, News Corp announced that it would sell the Dow Jones Local Media Group, a group of 33 local newspapers, to Newcastle Investment Corp, an affiliate of Fortress, for $87 million. The newspapers were operated by GateHouse Media following the purchase. CEO Robert James Thomson indicated that the newspapers "were not strategically consistent with the emerging portfolio" of the company, which had been formed as a spin-off of News Corporation.

By 2013, GateHouse Media grew, operating in 330 markets across 21 states, but they found themselves in a debt situation that would prohibit future growth. The company filed for Chapter 11 bankruptcy in U.S. Bankruptcy Court in Wilmington, Delaware on September 27, 2013. It listed assets of $433.7 million and debt of $1.3 billion. The planned bankruptcy centered on restructuring the Fortress News Corp deal. Fortress owned 52% of GateHouse debt. Gatehouse re-emerged from the planned bankruptcy in November 2013. In the restructured plan, Gatehouse stock was cancelled and a new holding company for the parent, New Media Investment Group, Inc., was formed. The terms involved the cancellation of shares of Gatehouse, but those owners receiving warrants to buy shares in New Media Investment Group Inc.

== Post-restructuring ==
In January 2015, GateHouse purchased the 36 newspapers of the Halifax Media Group for $280 million. In February 2015, GateHouse purchased Stephens Media, which published newspapers mainly in Arkansas and Nevada, for $102.8 million. In December 2015, GateHouse sold the Las Vegas Review-Journal, the Stephens group's largest paper, to casino magnate Sheldon Adelson for $140 million.

In November 2016, GateHouse announced the purchase of Harris Enterprises, based in Hutchinson, Kan., which operated six daily newspapers in Kansas and Iowa. In February 2017, GateHouse purchased the Dix Communications newspaper chain for $21.2 million. Dix Communications operates in northeastern and east-central Ohio, including more than 30 daily and weekly newspapers. In June 2017, GateHouse announced it was purchasing Calkins Media Group's four six-day-a-week newspapers and Calkins Digital Group, a press facility and related websites and other digital operations.

In August 2017, GateHouse announced it was purchasing 11 daily newspapers, 30 weeklies, and other assets from Morris Publishing Group, a division of Morris Communications.

In October 2017, GateHouse acquired Edward A. Sherman Publishing Company, parent of The Newport Daily News.

In January 2018, GateHouse announced its purchase of Oregon's second-largest daily newspaper, The Register-Guard.

In February 2018, GateHouse announced the acquisition of Kirk Davis's independently owned Holden Landmark Corporation for an undisclosed sum. The sale includes the central Massachusetts media properties, Worcester Magazine, The Landmark, baystateparent Magazine, Leominster Champion, Millbury-Sutton Chronicle, and the Grafton News.

In March 2018, GateHouse announced its $47.5 million purchase of the Austin American-Statesman of Austin, Texas. It is the largest newspaper in Central Texas. In the same month, GateHouse announced its $49.25 million purchase of The Palm Beach Post and Palm Beach Daily News from Cox Media Group, LLC.

On April 10, 2018, GateHouse announced that it had agreed to acquire the Akron Beacon Journal of Akron, Ohio for $16 million from Black Press Group. The Beacon Journal is a daily newspaper tracing its storied, Pulitzer Prize-winning history to 1839's Summit Beacon, which early in the 20th century came under the editorship and ownership of publisher Charles Landon Knight, serving as the flagship newspaper of the Knight Newspaper Company, later known as Knight Ridder.

On July 2, 2018, GateHouse acquired SouthernKitchen.com, the Atlanta-based Southern food and lifestyle brand. Southern Kitchen, launched by Cox Media Group (CMG) in 2017, is a blend of e-commerce and content. It delivers content and products related to eating, drinking, and entertaining with a Southern flair.

On September 27, 2018, GateHouse Media announced the acquisition of The Oklahoman Media Company, parent company of The Oklahoman, which is the state's largest daily newspaper, for an undisclosed amount from The Anschutz Corp. The sale closed on Oct. 1, 2018, for $12.5 million.

On January 28, 2019, it was announced that GateHouse Media had acquired the publishing division of Schurz Communications including The Herald-Times in Bloomington, Indiana, South Bend Tribune in South Bend, Indiana, and other papers in Clay, Lawrence, Monroe, Morgan, Orange, Owen, and Putnam counties in Indiana. That same year, it acquired the New Jersey Herald in Newton, New Jersey, from Quincy Media.

== Acquisition of and rebranding to Gannett ==
In August 2019, it was announced that New Media Investment Group had reached an agreement to acquire Gannett Company. The merged company would take on the better-known Gannett name and be based at Gannett's headquarters in McLean, Virginia, but with New Media Investment Group's CEO Mike Reed as CEO.

The acquisition of Gannett by New Media Investment Group was completed on November 19, 2019, making the combined company the largest newspaper publisher in the United States.
