= News Corp =

American multinational mass media company

News Corporation

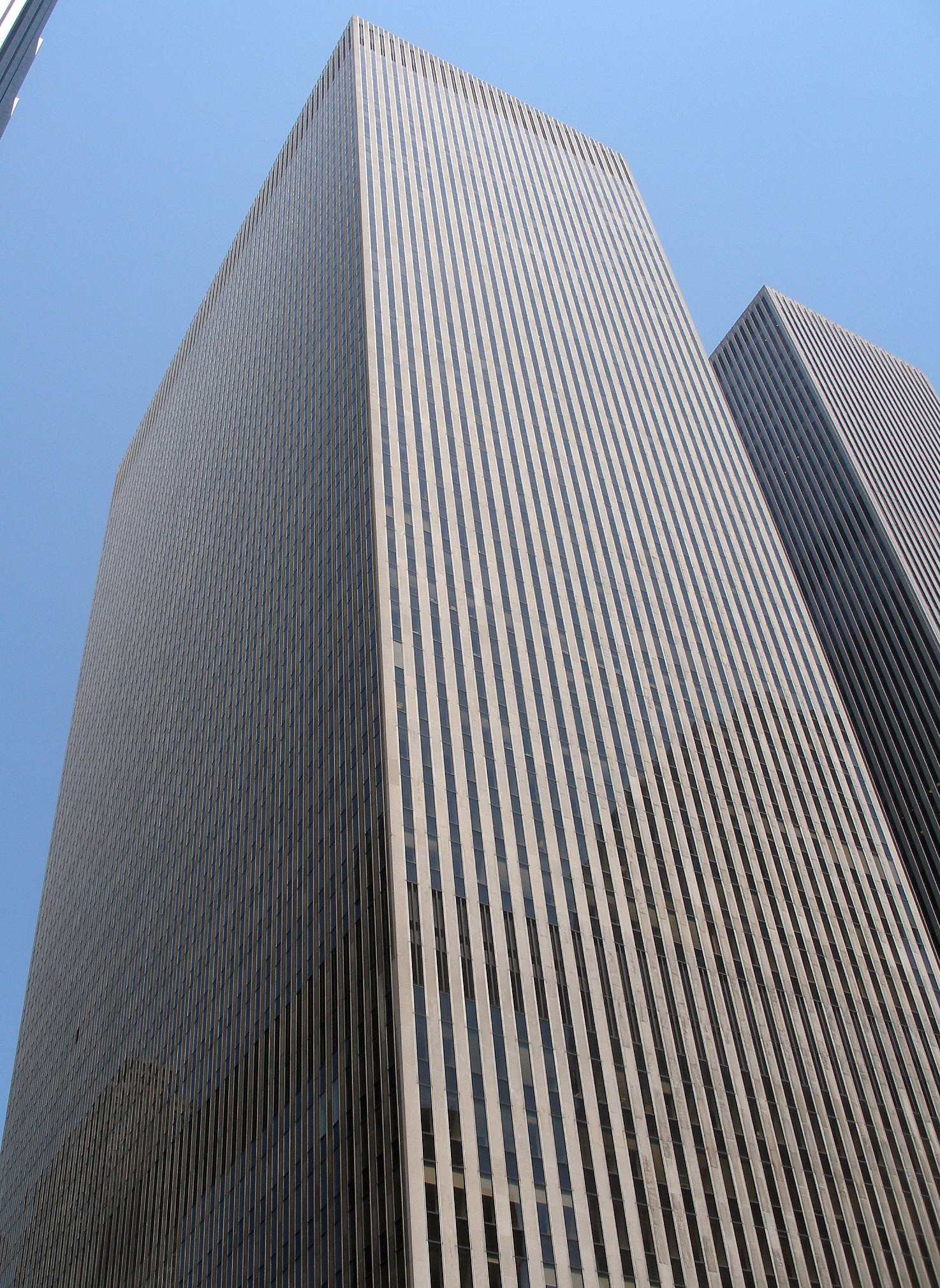
- Headquarters in Manhattan, New York City
- Trade name: News Corp
- Type: Public
- Traded as: Nasdaq: NWSA (Class A); Nasdaq: NWS (Class B); S&P 500 components (A & B; Nasdaq); ASX: NWSLV (Class A); ASX: NWS (Class B); S&P/ASX 200 component (B; ASX)
- ISIN: US65249B1098; US65249B2088
- Industry: Media
- Predecessor: News Corporation
- Founded: June 28, 2013; 13 years ago
- Founder: Rupert Murdoch
- Headquarters: 1211 Avenue of the Americas, New York City, United States
- Area served: Worldwide
- Key people: Rupert Murdoch (chairman emeritus); Lachlan Murdoch (chair); Robert James Thomson (CEO); Lavanya Chandrashekar (CFO)
- Products: Newspapers; Books; Digital media; Real estate
- Revenue: ▲US$8.45 billion (2025)
- Operating income: ▲US$824 million (2025)
- Net income: ▲US$1.18 billion (2025)
- Total assets: ▼US$15.5 billion (2025)
- Total equity: ▲US$8.77 billion (2025)
- Owner: Lachlan Murdoch (33% voting power)
- Number of employees: 22,300 (2025)
- Subsidiaries: List of subsidiaries
- Website: newscorp.com
- Footnotes; Financials as of June 30, 2025.

News Corporation, doing business as News Corp, is an American mass media and publishing company headquartered at 1211 Avenue of the Americas in Midtown Manhattan, New York City. The company was formed on June 28, 2013, as a spin-off of the first News Corporation, whose legal successor was 21st Century Fox, which held its media and entertainment assets. Operating across digital real estate information, news media, book publishing, and cable television, News Corp's notable assets include: Dow Jones & Company, which is the publisher of The Wall Street Journal; News UK, publisher of The Sun and The Times; News Corp Australia; REA Group, operator of realestate.com.au and realtor.com; and book publisher HarperCollins.

After News Corp announced its plan to split publicly on June 28, 2012, they had planned for it to be a necessary change in order to prioritize the separate needs of each company. Since they were going to be separate companies, each having its own team, it was supposed to make both companies more efficient relative to market changes. When News Corp officially split with Fox News on June 28, 2013, News Corp took a modified approach by changing the way they reported news and ads, while including other broader topics, which helped to increase viewers. This is a prime example of how the separation of companies led to immediate benefits without any significant negative impacts on either News Corp or Fox News.

Following the split, News Corp started 2013 with $2.6 billion, while being debt-free, which gave it an edge over its media competition to implement its plans and strategies to continue developing. After becoming an individual company, there were no longer concerns about maintaining profits or equal market strategies between News Corp and Fox News. The separation gave both companies benefits, increasing productivity, strategy, and company development and growth, while having complete economic and decision-making freedom as a result of this separation.

News Corp and 21st Century Fox are two companies that succeeded the original News Corp., which included Fox Entertainment Group and other broadcasting and media properties. The spin-out was structured so that 21st Century Fox was the legal continuation of the original News Corporation, with the new News Corp being a new company formed by a stock split. Since March 2019, Fox Corporation, which holds 21st Century Fox's national broadcasting, news and sports assets, is also under the Murdoch family's control. In November 2023, Rupert Murdoch stepped down as News Corp's chairman, becoming "chairman emeritus".

== History ==
Evolution of News Corp
- 1952: Rupert Murdoch inherited the News tabloid from his father and used it to develop a media conglomerate
- 1954: After acquiring News Limited, Murdoch purchased and established dozens of newspapers throughout Australia
- 1960s: News Limited began to expand globally and bought out several British tabloids like The Sun and News of the World
- 1980: To manage its growing operations, News Corporation was incorporated as the holding company for News Limited
- 1981: News International was formed to manage News Corp's British properties
- 1985: News Corporation officially expanded beyond print media and acquired the 20th Century-Fox film studio
- 1986: Metromedia stations were used to launch the Fox Broadcasting Network
- 1990: Fox Entertainment Group was established to manage News Corp's filmed entertainment properties
- Mid 1990s: Fox Sports and Fox News were launched, with both becoming leaders in cable news and sports programming
- 2004: News Corp relocated from its long time Adelaide headquarters to New York City at 1211 Avenue of Americas
- 2007: Dow Jones & Company was acquired, giving News Corp financial news outlets like the The Wall Street Journal
- 2013: Following controversies involving the News of the World in 2011, investors pushed for changes, leading to the second News Corp and 21st Century Fox
- 2019: The Walt Disney Company acquired majority of 21st Century Fox, while the remaining news, sports, and broadcast units became Fox Corporation
- 2023: Attempts to remerge News Corp and Fox were explored but later withdrawn

=== Formation ===
News Corporation, referred to as "News Corp," was started in 1980 in Australia. It was founded by Rupert Murdoch, who led the company in its publishing, in both news and books, as well as television. These were all published in the United States, the United Kingdom, and Australia, allowing the new and growing company to gain popularity worldwide.

Starting in 1981, News Corp started developing its television industry, which became its primary goal through the 1990s. In 1996, News Corp began premiering Fox News, which significantly gained popularity. Following the success of News Corp's Fox News, it acquired the publisher of the Wall Street Journal, Dow Jones & Company. This was another success for News Corp since it gave it important names throughout writing, publishing, and television.

As News Corp continued to expand its ownership in June 2010, by putting out a bid for British Sky Broadcasting, it was unable to go through with the acquisition of the television and telephone company. When fact-checked rumors spread about faults in security, regarding a British source, News of the World, being criminally hacked, losing privacy in phone records, it caused News Corp to remove its offer one year later, in July 2011.

On June 28, 2012, Rupert Murdoch announced that News Corporation's publishing operations would be spun off to form a new, publicly traded company. Murdoch stated that performing this split would "unlock the true value of both companies and their distinct assets, enabling investors to benefit from the separate strategic opportunities resulting from more focused management of each division". The move also came in the wake of a series of scandals that had damaged the reputation of multiple News Corporation-owned properties.

On June 28, 2012, News Corp decided to divide both its publishing and media into two different public companies. This change was made to give more focus to each department, while it continued to expand and gain new companies, publishers, and producers. Following the split, the publishing company produced mainstream newspapers, like The Wall Street Journal, as well as publishing books. The media company focused on broadcasting, cable networks in television, producing films, and its pay-tv. Following the split of the company, News Corp's owner continued on with both companies, taking the positions of chairman of the publishing and media entertainment company, while giving up his long-term position as CEO.

Dividing the company into two parts influenced both sections to put extra focus into their own development, without needing to balance the publication and entertainment companies together. In addition to having more focus on each department and company, News Corp brought in extra help with new management teams, which helped both companies stabilize following the split. News Corp also implemented new and separate boards of directors for each company. After this decision, both teams created plans to ensure the split would go smoothly, without causing unnecessary conflict in either department.

Robert Thomson, then editor of The Wall Street Journal, was announced as the initial chief operating officer for the company. While Murdoch did not serve as CEO, he remained chairman and a shareholder of the new News Corp. Thomson promised that the new company would "cultivate a start-up sensibility even though we already work for the world's most established and prestigious diversified media and information services company" and would emphasize building new business models around its properties and content. The logo of the new News Corporation was unveiled at an investor presentation on May 28, 2013; the handwritten logo uses script based on Murdoch's own handwriting. News Corp's board approved the split on May 24, 2013, while shareholders approved the split on June 11;

Preliminary trading on the Australian Securities Exchange of the new News Corp's class B stock began on June 19, 2013, at around $15 per share; a value slightly lower than expected by some analysts. The shares fell in price by 3% to $14.55 per share, valuing the new company at around $7.9 billion US. The corporate split was finalized on June 28, 2013; during the stock splitting process, one share of the new News Corp was given to shareholders for every four shares they owned in the former News Corp.

The current News Corp began trading on the Nasdaq stock exchange under the symbol "NWS" on July 1, 2013; at the same time, the former News Corporation (which encompassed purely media properties, such as Fox Entertainment Group and 20th Century Fox) was renamed 21st Century Fox.

=== After the split ===
On September 4, 2013, News Corp announced that it would sell the Dow Jones Local Media Group, a group of 33 local newspapers, to Newcastle Investment Corp., an affiliate of Fortress Investment Group, for $87 million. The newspapers will be operated by GateHouse Media, a newspaper group owned by Fortress. Robert Thomson indicated that the newspapers "were not strategically consistent with the emerging portfolio" of the company. GateHouse then filed for prepackaged Chapter 11 bankruptcy on September 27, 2013, to restructure its debt obligations to accommodate the acquisition. Then GateHouse emerged from bankruptcy on November 26, 2013.

On December 20, 2013, News Corp announced its acquisition of Dublin, Ireland-based social news agency Storyful, a startup founded by journalist Mark Little. At the time, Storyful was described as "scour[ing] social-media services like Twitter and Instagram" to discover user-generated content "breaking news and viral online content" and after sourcing, to then verify, acquire, and distribute it. Storyful had, for instance, reported 2013 results of 750m views of user-generated videos by its partners. The cost of the Storyful acquisition was €18 million (£15m, US$25m), and marked News Corp's first acquisition since the split. News Corp CEO at the time, Robert Thomson, stated that the service had "become the village square for valuable video, using journalistic sensibility, integrity and creativity", and that with the acquisition, News Corp would "define the opportunities that the digital landscape presents, rather than simply adapt to them".

On May 2, 2014, News Corp acquired romance novel publisher Harlequin Enterprises from Torstar for $415 million. The deal closed on August 1; it is now operated as a subsidiary of News Corp's HarperCollins.

On September 30, 2014, News Corp announced its acquisition of Move, Inc., a real estate listings company and owner of Realtor.com, a 20% stake of which was, at the time, owned by REA Group, a publicly traded subsidiary of News Corp Australia.

News Corp also began making investments in India in late 2014, such as a $30 million investment in real estate site ProTiger in November, the December 2014 purchase of BigDecisions.com, a financial planning website, and the acquisition of Indian media firm VCCircle in March 2015.

In October 2015, News Corp sold its digital education brand Amplify to a management team supported by a group of private investors for an undisclosed sum. In June 2016, News Corp acquired Wireless Group (formerly UTV Media), a British radio broadcaster, for $296 million

In January 2020, News Corp sold Unruly, an outstream video ad marketplace, in exchange of 6.91% of Tremor Video stock. On July 31, 2020, James Murdoch resigned from the News Corp board of directors, "due to disagreements over certain editorial content published by the Company's news outlets and certain other strategic decisions."

On February 4, 2022, News Corp suffered a cyberattack from hackers believed to be linked to China.

On October 14, 2022, it was announced that, under the instruction of Rupert Murdoch, a special committee had been established to explore a potential merger of Fox and News Corp, bringing the two companies back together since the former 21st Century Fox was spun-off from News Corp in 2013. On January 24, 2023, the proposed merger was abandoned by Murdoch.

In February 2023, the company announced that it would be cutting 5% of its workforce across its various divisions.

In September 2023, News Corp reported that Rupert Murdoch would retire from the board of News Corporation. He would also retire from the board of Fox Corporation and his son Lachlan Murdoch would replace him on both boards. The retirement would take effect in November 2023.

An annual meeting of shareholders was held by webcast on 20 November 2024, to determine whether the "dual-class" share structure (voting and non-voting) would be abolished, after Starboard Value, which has bought up a large share of News Corp over the previous year, had proposed a one-share-one-vote system. News Corp had stated that if the proposal is accepted, the new system of shares could only be introduced if agreement between voting and non-voting shareholders was reached. This relates to the ongoing court case in Nevada pitting Rupert and Lachlan Murdoch against the other three siblings, who all have voting shares. The proposal was not accepted at the meeting.

In June 2025, the company announced it had extended the contract of its chief executive Robert Thomson to June 2030.

In January 2026, the California Post was launched as a local version of the New York Post.

== Outcome ==
Although News Corp and 21st Century Fox were stable and had gained mainstream popularity, this ended abruptly after Murdoch's announcement in 2013. As Murdoch held positions of chairman at both News Corp and 21st Century Fox, following the split, News Corp itself had a strong focus on publishing journals, articles, and books. 21st Century Fox focused on broadcasts, television, and film production. Although it appears as an equal split, on the first day of trading, Fox went up over 2% while News Corp plummeted 5%. This difference in stocks represents how people shifted toward digital news and entertainment, and had left paper-copies in the past.

By becoming separate companies, the management teams gain control over specific needs and goals. This is significant because it allows for more strategic moves within a single company, leading to improved efficiency and customized needs. Although splitting the companies has not solved the main issue of improving each company, both companies were given an opportunity to develop and grow on their own. Following the British news breach of security, the amount of backlash influenced the need to part ways.

After News Corp split with 21st Century Fox, News Corp lost most of its power and stopped generating as much wealth. In the U.K., the company had a decrease in revenue of 10% in 2023 alone.

A key issue causing revenue to fall at News Corp is its outdated advertisement strategies. The majority of its advertisements are on paper, which have gained less attention and action, causing them to lose money. Digital advertising was one of its strategies to stabilize revenue and return it to quarterly standards. Digital marketing did help to increase revenue, but only accounted for 37% of all marketing done by News Corp.

News Corp had internal issues, and splitting apart was one way of attempting to restore stability. As a result of this decision, more conflict arose since it did not put an end to it. News Corp also ended up in a worse position than they had previously been in, before cutting ties with 21st Century Fox.

=== Leadership and Management ===
News Corp's governmental structure focuses on board supervision, helping with large media sources and publishing. After News Corp's split, in 2013, Murdoch used his influence to create his personal strategic plans to guide News Corp into better economic levels. Murdoch helped by spreading assets of News Corp, and other digital sources.

Another position in leadership is CEO Robert J. Thomson, who has been CEO since January 2013. He is still set to fill the position until his contract expires in June 2030. Thomson has modernized News Corp by switching from paper to digital. Digital revenues went from 20% of total revenue in 2014, to 50% in 2024.

Together, the executive leadership team and board form a governance framework that balances operational leadership with independent oversight. This structure supports strategic groupwork and accountability, allowing News Corp to adapt in a quick changing media landscape while holding up commitments to shareholders and stakeholders.

== Succession ==
In September 2024, Rupert Murdoch applied to a Nevada probate court to remove voting rights from his children other than Lachlan, as set out in the irrevocable family trust. The other siblings, Prudence MacLeod, Elisabeth Murdoch, and James Murdoch, are more moderate politically than their father or brother, and Rupert was keen to keep the conservative political leanings in his media outlets. On December 9, 2024, The New York Times reported that the court had ruled against Rupert and Lachlan Murdoch, who, the probate commissioner wrote, had acted in bad faith when trying to change the trust.

== Assets ==
The company consists of the former News Corporation's newspaper and book publishing assets, together with the digital real-estate advertising properties that are now its largest business.

== See also ==
- Succession of Rupert Murdoch, a 2024 court case
