= Fortress Investment Group =

American investment management firm

Fortress Investment Group, LLC
- Type: Private
- Industry: Investment Management Firm: Private Equity, Credit, Real Estate, Asset Management
- Founded: 1998; 28 years ago
- Founder: Wesley R. Edens; Rob Kauffman; Randal A. Nardone; Pete Briger; Michael Novogratz
- Headquarters: 1345 Avenue of the Americas; New York City, U.S.
- Key people: Peter L. Briger (Executive chairman); Drew McNight (co-CEO); Jack Neumark (President)
- Products: Private Equity, Private Credit, Liquid Markets, Insurance, Hedge funds
- AUM: US$53 billion (2025)
- Number of employees: 900+
- Parent: Mubadala Investment Company
- Website: fortress.com

Fortress Investment Group, LLC is an American multi-manager investment firm based in New York City. The firm invests in corporate credit, real estate, private equity, insurance, and permanent capital strategies. Fortress manages $53 billion of assets as of August 2025 on behalf of over 2,000 institutional clients and private investors worldwide.

Fortress was founded in 1998. The company listed on the NYSE in February 2007, delisted in 2017, and, as of 2024, began operating as a privately held and independent brand. Drew McKnight and Joshua Pack were the co-CEOs of Fortress, prior to Mr. Pack's unexpected passing in September 2025.

== History ==
=== Foundational years (1998–2017) ===
Fortress Investment Group LLC was founded in 1998 in New York City as a private equity firm in 1998 by Wesley R. Edens, a former partner at BlackRock; Rob Kauffman, a managing director at UBS; Randal A. Nardone, also a managing director at UBS; Michael Novogratz, a former partner at Goldman Sachs; and Pete Briger, also a former partner at Goldman Sachs. The firm quickly expanded into hedge funds, real estate-related investments and debt securities, with Michael Novogratz leading the hedge fund strategy and Peter Briger overseeing the credit and real estate-related investments.

Fortress completed its initial public offering on February 8, 2007, with Goldman Sachs and Lehman Brothers underwriting the IPO.

When Fortress launched on the NYSE on February 9, 2007, it was the first large private equity firm in the United States to be traded publicly. Fortress and its principals were subsequently featured in an April 2009 Vanity Fair article on the adverse economic conditions facing hedge funds.

In 2014, Fortress was named "Hedge Fund Manager of the Year" by Institutional Investor and "Management Firm of the Year" by HFMWeek. Fortress was previously recognized by Institutional Investor as “Discretionary Macro-Focused Hedge Fund of the Year” for 2012, and “Credit-Focused Fund of the Year” for both 2011 and 2010.

On October 13, 2015, the company announced that its $2.3 billion Macro Fund was to close down and would distribute its assets to investors. This development came after its co-CIOs Jeff Feig and Michael Novogratz stepped down from the fund and retired from the firm, respectively.

By 2016, Fortress Investment Group had four core businesses totaling approximately $70.2 billion of assets under management: private equity, credit, liquid markets and traditional asset management.

=== Privately held (2017–2023) ===
On February 14, 2017, SoftBank Group agreed that it would buy Fortress Investment Group LLC for $3.3 billion. The SoftBank acquisition was completed in the last week of December, with Fortress being delisted from the New York Stock Exchange, and returned to being a privately held company. In December 2017, Fortress Investment Group loaned $100 million to Theranos with the loan to keep the medical startup solvent through 2018. At the time, Fortress also had "underdog" bets in a private passenger rail line in Florida.

Through an investment in Florida East Coast Railway, Fortress became an early backer of the Brightline passenger rail in Florida, which is the only privately owned and operated passenger railroad in the United States. Fortress Investment Group invested in the construction of Brightline West, a high speed rail route between Las Vegas and Southern California.

On January 3, 2018, it was reported that Fortress was nearing a deal to sell its stake on OneMain to Apollo Global Management. The agreement was announced on January 5, with Varde Partners also taking part in the purchase.

In 2023, it was announced that Fortress’ management team and Mubadala Capital would acquire all Fortress equity held by SoftBank Group.

=== Independent brand (2024–present) ===
On May 15, 2024, it was announced that Mubadala and Fortress management had jointly completed the purchase of Fortress Investment Group. Following the acquisition, Fortress began operating independently under its own brand, with Fortress management owning a 32% equity interest.

In May 2025, Fortress opened its Abu Dhabi location, which provides private credit and real estate investments in the Gulf region.

== Portfolio companies ==
Fortress's private equity investment portfolio includes: Loungers, Red Lobster, Spa Resort Hawaiians, Dataminr, and Umami Burger.

In 2006, Fortress-managed funds acquired Canadian ski resort operator Intrawest, North America's largest ski resort operator. Intrawest was sold by Fortress in 2017.

In May 2007, Florida East Coast Industries (FECI), parent company of Florida East Coast Railway (FEC), announced that, following a unanimous vote of the FECI Board of Directors, a Fortress-managed fund would acquire FECI in a transaction valued at $3.5 billion. The Surface Transportation Board approved the transaction in September 2007. It was through this investment that the Brightline train company was established.

In June 2007, Fortress announced that it would partner with Centerbridge Partners to acquire Penn National Gaming, an operator of casinos and horse racing venues, for $6.1 billion. Penn National shareholders were to receive $67 cash for each share. In July 2008, Fortress backed away from the agreement amidst the uncertain economic climate. Under the termination agreement, Penn National received $1.475 billion, consisting of a breakup fee of $225 million and an interest-free $1.25 billion loan from Fortress, Centerbridge, Wachovia and Deutsche Bank. Fortress co-chairman Wesley Edens assumed a seat on the board of Penn National as part of the agreement.

In January 2014, Fortress was the winning bidder for the assets of the Montreal, Maine and Atlantic Railway. In March 2014, John E. Giles of Great Lakes Partners estimated a $10–$20 million investment would be needed over three years to repair the line, which Fortress branded as the Central Maine and Quebec Railway. The sale was completed in May 2014, for US$15.85 million.

In October 2014, it was reported by the Birmingham Business Journal that Fortress had purchased the Inverness Corners retail center. Fortress Investment Group is also the parent company to Mystays hotels and resorts in Japan.

In April 2024, Fortress purchased the UK discount retailer Poundstretcher, which also included its 60 store sister discount chain Bargain Buys. This purchase was added to other UK businesses in its portfolio which included, Majestic Wine and Punch Pubs. Fortress also announced that it had committed $3.2 billion in financing for SoFi as an extension to a prior $2 billion agreement.

In 2024, Fortress acquired cinema chain Curzon for $5mn as part of an auction after Fortress won a lawsuit against Charles Cohen for defaulting on a $534mn loan made in 2019.

In June 2024, funds managed by affiliates of Fortress completed a £750 million forward flow agreement with Tabeo (company), described as the largest provider of retail finance for primary care providers in the United Kingdom. The financing was intended to support Tabeo's growth and its acquisition of new enterprise customers across dental, hearing, optical and veterinary care, and was arranged through the Fortress Asset-Based Credit business.

Fortress acquired Red Lobster in September 2024. That same month, Fortress also announced its acquisition of Spa Resort Hawaiians for US$98 million.

In February 2025, Fortress acquired UK-based café and bar chain Loungers for US$486 million.

In February 2026, the company purchased the Ocean Terminal shopping centre in Edinburgh, Scotland, for approximately £15 million.

== Controversies ==
=== 2010 Winter Olympics ===
Fortress Investment Group was the primary lender to Millennium Development Group for building the C$875 million athlete's village for the 2010 Winter Olympics in Southeast False Creek, Vancouver, British Columbia; however, Fortress was unable to provide further financing to Millennium, forcing the City of Vancouver to pay approximately C$450 million to complete the project in November 2009. Three weeks before the opening of the 2010 Winter Olympics, Intrawest was slated for auction after Fortress failed to make the final payment on its loan used to buy out Intrawest. This caused its creditors to force Intrawest to divest itself of several of its resort holdings in 2009 and 2010 to reduce its debt load. Fortress became the owner of the village after the 2010 Winter Olympics.

=== VLSI Technology LLC and INVT SPE LLC ===
VLSI Technology LLC and INVT SPE LLC, portfolio companies owned by investment funds managed by Fortress, have filed several lawsuits against Apple, Intel, HTC, ZTE and other telecommunications companies. In 2019, VLSI alleged Intel's SpeedStep technology introduced in 2005 infringes on its patent purchased. During this same time, VLSI asserted its patents against several other Intel products and obtained two jury verdicts totaling over $3 billion. INVT SPE LLC was assigned 740 telecommunications patents originally filed by Panasonic after funds managed by Fortress acquired assets previously belonging to Inventergy Global, Inc.

=== Labrador Diagnostics ===
On March 9, 2020, an LLC owned by funds managed by Fortress through its non-operating subsidiary Labrador Diagnostics (which holds patents previously owned by Theranos), alleged that BioFire's FilmArray technology infringed some of its patents. On March 3, 2020, The Wall Street Journal published an article identifying that bioMérieux was working on two diagnostic tests for COVID-19. After the patent infringement lawsuit was filed, bioMérieux announced that BioFire was developing tests to detect SARS-CoV-2. After the announcement, Labrador claimed that when it filed the lawsuit against BioFire it had no idea BioFire was developing COVID-19 testing kits. Fortress subsequently offered to grant both the defendants and anyone else a royalty-free license for its technology for use in COVID-19 tests.

== See also ==
- List of asset management firms
- List of hedge funds
