= Robert Thomson (executive) =

Australian journalist

Robert James Dell’Oro Thomson
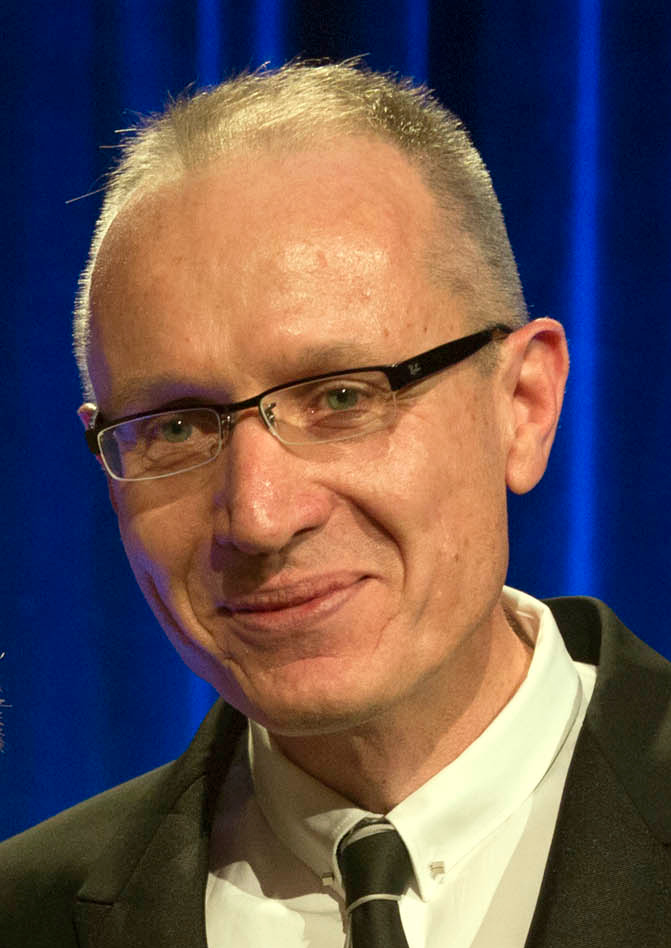
- Thomson in 2014
- Born: 11 March 1961 (age 65); Torrumbarry, Victoria, Australia
- Education: RMIT University
- Occupations: journalist, editor
- Spouse: Wang Ping

Robert James Dell’Oro Thomson (born 11 March 1961) is an Australian journalist and business executive. He has been the chief executive of News Corp since 2013.

== Early life ==
Thomson was born in Torrumbarry, Victoria, and studied at Christian Brothers College in St Kilda East, and at the Royal Melbourne Institute of Technology.

== Career ==
Thomson started work as a copyboy at The Herald (now the Herald Sun) in Melbourne in 1979. In 1983, he became senior feature writer for The Sydney Morning Herald, and two years later became Beijing correspondent for The Sydney Morning Herald as well as the Financial Times. Thomson then became a Tokyo correspondent for the Financial Times in 1989. Thomson was appointed the Financial Times foreign news editor in 1994 and in 1996 became editor of the Financial Times weekend edition. While at Sydney Morning Herald, Thomson wrote a series on Australian judges, which was published as a book in 1987, The Judges: A Portrait of an Australian Judiciary. In 1998, Thomson became U.S. managing editor of the Financial Times.

In 2007, Thomson was one of the first media executives to criticise Google and big tech for the disaggregation of content and publication of falsehoods, and to pressure them for a higher share of advertising value. He has been known to use alliterative expressions to call out those companies, such as platforms for "the fake, the faux and the fallacious", and "tech tapeworms." Thomson called for new terms of trade for tech platforms to allow viable business models for creators and to benefit broader society.

In May 2008, he was appointed managing editor of The Wall Street Journal, having previously been the editor of The Times.

He received an honorary doctorate from RMIT University in 2010.

In January 2013, Thomson became the chief executive of News Corp.

In 2023, Thomson has decried the unauthorised use of journalistic content by generative AI and the resulting existential risk posed to media companies. Thomson and several other media leaders have called for compensation by tech companies that are developing and employing AI. Speaking in May 2023 at INMA, a media conference, Thomson summed up the industry's outrage, saying "[media's] collective IP is under threat and for which we should argue vociferously for compensation." He said that AI was "designed so the reader will never visit a journalism website, thus fatally undermining that journalism."

In June 2025, it was reported that News Corp had extended Thomson's contract as its chief executive until June 2030.

== Personal life ==
One of his ancestors was named Arturo Dell'Oro, and came from Domodossola, in northern Italy. He is married to Wang Ping, the daughter of a general in the Chinese People's Liberation Army.

Media offices
Preceded by Peter Stothard	Editor of The Times; 2002–2007	Succeeded by James Harding
