= Ellen Adair =

American actress

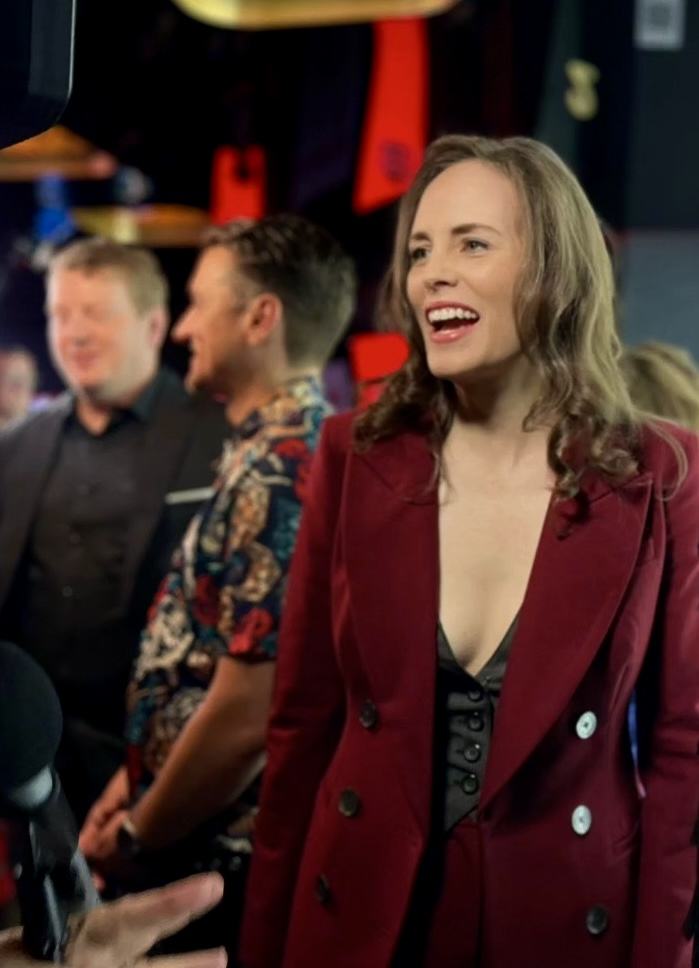
- Adair attending the 2023 FrightFest
- Born: Ellen Adair Glassie; April 2, 1988 (age 38); Philadelphia, Pennsylvania
- Education: Boston University (BA); University of Oxford
- Occupation: Actor
- Years active: 2006–present
- Spouse: Eric Gilde (m. 2013)
- Parents: Henry Glassie (father); Kathleen A. Foster (mother)

Ellen Adair (born 1988) is an American actor and writer, best known for playing Bess McTeer on season 2 of the USA anthology series The Sinner, and Janet Bayne on season 7 of the Showtime series Homeland. They have starred in multiple horror films, including Trick (2019), Cryptid (2022), and Herd (2023). For the later film, Awards Radar included Adair's portrayal of Jamie Miler among their "Best Horror Performances of 2023."

A veteran stage performer, Adair has appeared in the cult hit Sleep No More at The McKittrick Hotel, as well as numerous productions with Shakespeare Theatre Company, American Shakespeare Center, and Commonwealth Shakespeare Company.

== Early life and education ==
Ellen Adair was born in Philadelphia, Pennsylvania to Kathleen A. Foster, an art historian, and Henry Glassie, a folklorist and ethnomusicologist. Growing up, their parents' fieldwork resulted in the family living many different places.

Adair earned a BA in English from Boston University, and spent an erasmus year at the University of Oxford. During their time in Boston they began to work professionally as an actor.

== Career ==
Adair made their professional stage debut in 2005 as Thomasina in Tom Stoppard’s Arcadia at The Publick Theatre in Boston, earning an IRNE Award nomination for Best Actress. Over the next four years, they would prove a fixture in Boston theatre, appearing in numerous productions with Huntington Theatre Company, Lyric Stage Boston, Commonwealth Shakespeare Company, Actors' Shakespeare Project, SpeakEasy Stage Company, and New Repertory Theatre.

In 2006 Adair made their television debut as a guest star on the Showtime crime series Brotherhood. From 2009-2010 they appeared as Nurse Gretchen Taylor on the long-running CBS soap opera As the World Turns. Adair's breakthrough role came in 2015, when they were cast as ADA Bridget Saltire in the NBC miniseries The Slap. In 2017 Adair appeared in season 2 of the Showtime series Billions. Their character Graff was a portfolio manager at Axe Capital, and an employee of Damien Lewis's character Bobby Axelrod. The following year, Adair had a recurring arc as antagonist Janet Bayne on season 7 of the Showtime series Homeland. Later that same year Adair appeared as Bess McTeer on season 2 of the USA anthology series The Sinner.

Adair made their film debut as Jen in the 2013 horror film The Unwanted. In 2019 they starred opposite Omar Epps in the slasher film Trick. In 2022 Adair appeared the independent drama film Love and Communication, which explores parenting a young child on the autism spectrum. In 2023 they starred in the horror films Cryptid and Herd. For the later film, Awards Daily included Adair among their "Best Horror Performances of 2023."

In addition to acting, Adair is also a published poet and has been nominated for a Pushcart Prize. Their debut poetry collection Curtain Speech was published by Pen & Anvil Press in 2015.

== Personal life ==
In 2013 Adair married fellow actor Eric Gilde, with whom they co-founded Happy Few Theatre Company. They live together in Jackson Heights, Queens.

Adair is vocal fan of the Philadelphia Phillies, and regularly appears as a sports analyst on the MLB Network’s Off Base. They've also appeared on Hot Stove, MLB Now, and MLB Central.

Adair is non-binary and uses they/them pronouns.

== Acting credits ==
=== Film ===
Year	Title	Role	Ref.
2013	The Unwanted	Jen	
2019	Trick	Lisa Jayne	
2022	Love and Communication	Julia	
2023	Cryptid	Harriet	
2023	Herd	Jamie Miller	
2025	Womb	Martha	
2025	The Housemaid	Lisa	

=== Television ===
Year	Title	Role	Notes	Ref.
2006	Brotherhood	Jamie Finnerty	Episode: "Matthew 22:10"	
2007-2009	American Masters	Various	3 episodes	
2009-2010	As the World Turns	Gretchen Taylor	Recurring, Season 54	
2010	God in America	Sister Mary Johnson	Episode: "A Nation Reborn"	
2014	Nurse Jackie	Lady Pharmacist	Episode: "Nancy Wood"	
2015	Veep	Wallace	2 episodes	
2015	The Slap	ADA Bridget Saltire	Miniseries, 4 episodes	
2016	The Family	Reporter	2 episodes	
2016	I Love You ... But I Lied	Nicole	Episode: "Paranoid"	
2017	Billions	Graff	6 episodes	
2018	Homeland	Janet Bayne	5 episodes	
2018	The Sinner	Bess McTeer	Main role, Season 2	
2018	Shades of Blue	Internal Affairs Detective Jane	Episode: "Goodnight, Sweet Prince"	
2018	Chicago Fire	Amy Whittaker	Episode: "Thirty Percent Slight of Hand"	
2019	The Good Fight	Fiona Novak	Episode: "The One Where a Nazi Gets Punched"	
2019-2021	Bull	ADA Glover	3 episodes	
2020	NCIS: New Orleans	Karla Monroe	Episode: "Waiting for Monroe"	
2022	Archive 81	Emma Trillay	Episode: "The Ferryman"	
2022	FBI	Olivia Blake	Episode: "Face Off"	
2024	Law & Order	Dr. Angela Jeffers	Episode: "On the Ledge"	
2024	Found	Jocelyn Mosley	Episode: "Missing While Gabi Mosley"	
2024-2025	Chicago Med	Mary Katherine Trempley	2 episodes	

=== Web series ===
Year	Title	Role	Notes	Ref.
2016	Detroit, I Love You	Iris	Maine role, 4 episodes	
2018	Roommating	Vivian	Maine role, 5 episodes	
2021	Joyland	Karen Lapidus	Maine role, 3 episodes	

=== Video games ===
Year	Title	Role	Notes	Ref.
2018	Red Dead Redemption 2	Additional voices	Rockstar Games	

=== Audio books ===
Year	Title	Author	Publisher	Ref.
2023	Why We Love Baseball	Joe Posnanski	Penguin Random House	
2024	Dirty Diana	Jen Besser and Shana Feste	Penguin Random House	
2024	The History of Sound	Ben Shattuck	Penguin Random House	
2024	Charlie Hustle	Keith O'Brien	Penguin Random House	

=== Stage ===
Year	Title	Role	Playwright	Venue	Ref.
2005	Arcadia	Thomasina	Tom Stoppard	The Publick Theatre	
2005	The Comedy of Errors	Luce	William Shakespeare	The Publick Theatre	
2005	Carol Mulroney	Carol Mulroney (u/s)	Stephen Belber	Huntington Theatre Company	
2005	A Doll's House	Nora Helmer	Henrik Ibsen	Devanaughn Theatre	
2006	Five by Tenn	Gladys/Girl	Tennessee Williams	SpeakEasy Stage Company	
2006	All's Well That Ends Well	Diana	William Shakespeare	Actors' Shakespeare Project	
2006	The Beard of Avon	Lady Lettice	Amy Freed	The Publick Theatre	
2006	Rabbit Hole	Izzy (u/s)	David Lindsay-Abaire	Huntington Theatre Company	
2007	Arms and the Man	Raina	George Bernard Shaw	Lyric Stage Boston	
2007	The Diary of Anne Frank	Margot Frank	Frances Goodrich & Albert Hackett	New Repertory Theatre	
2007	Macbeth	Lady Macbeth	William Shakespeare	New Repertory Theatre	
2008	The Merchant of Venice	Portia	William Shakespeare	American Shakespeare Center	
2008	Henry V	Katherine/Boy	William Shakespeare	American Shakespeare Center	
2008	The Taming of the Shrew	Bianca	William Shakespeare	American Shakespeare Center	
2008	A Christmas Carol	Mrs. Cratchit	Charles Dickens	American Shakespeare Center	
2008	Henry IV, Part 1	Lady Percy	William Shakespeare	Shakespeare Theatre Company	
2009	'Tis Pity She's a Whore	Philotis	John Ford	Baltimore Center Stage	
2009	The Playboy of the Western World	Sara Tansey	John Millington Synge	Pearl Theatre Company, Off-Broadway	
2009	The Yellow Leaf	Mary Shelley	Charles Morley	Pioneer Theatre Company	
2010	Major Barbara	Jenny Hill	George Bernard Shaw	Gingold Theatrical Group, Off-Broadway	
2010	The Playboy of the Western World	Margaret Flaherty	John Millington Synge	Pennsylvania Shakespeare Festival	
2010	Romeo and Hamlet	Juliet	R. Jonathan Chapman & Kevin Stefan	Gayfest NYC, Off-Broadway	
2010	All's Well that Ends Well	Helena	William Shakespeare	Shakespeare Theatre of New Jersey	
2011	What the Public Wants	Emily Vernon	Arnold Bennett	Mint Theater Company, Off-Broadway	
2011	Light Falling	Ismay	Teresa Deevy	Mint Theater Company, Off-Broadway	
2011	Mary's Wedding	Mary	Stephen Massicotte	Kitchen Theatre Company	
2012	Red Light Winter	Christina	Adam Rapp	Kitchen Theatre Company	
2012	Marie Antoinette: The Color of Flesh	Marie Antoinette	Joel Gross	Portland Stage Company	
2012	Victor Frange Presents Gas!	Smokey	Georg Kaiser & Dan O’Neil	Incubator Arts Project, Off-Broadway	
2013	Ryan Landry's "M"	The Woman	Ryan Landry	Huntington Theater Company	
2013	The Two Gentlemen of Verona	Silvia	William Shakespeare	Commonwealth Shakespeare Company	
2013	The Mousetrap	Mollie Ralston	Agatha Christie	The Repertory Theatre of St. Louis	
2014	As You Like It	Rosalind	William Shakespeare	TheaterLab, Off-off-Broadway	
2014	Private Lives	Amanda/Sybil (u/s)	Noël Coward	Shakespeare Theatre Company	
2014	Sleep No More	Special Guest Performer	William Shakespeare	Punchdrunk / The McKittrick Hotel, Off-Broadway	
2014-2015	Cymbeline	Imogen (u/s)	William Shakespeare	Theatre for a New Audience / Barrow Street Theatre, Off-Broadway	
2015	The Importance of Being Earnest	Gwendolyn Fairfax	Oscar Wilde	Queens Theatre, Off-Broadway	
2016	the goodbye room	Bex	Eric Gilde	Shetler Studios, Off-off-Broadway	
2017	Constellations	Marianne	Nick Payne	The Repertory Theatre of St. Louis	
2017	The Suitcase Under the Bed	Sara Meade/Doris	Teresa Deevy	Mint Theater Company, Off-Broadway	
2025	Flawless	Tess	John J. Wooten	Penguin Rep	

== Awards ==
Year	Association	Category	Work	Result	Ref.
2006	IRNE Awards	Best Actress	Arcadia	Nominated	
2011	BroadwayWorld Regional Awards	Best Actress in a Play	Mary's Wedding	Nominated	
2012	BroadwayWorld Regional Awards	Best Actress in a Play	Red Light Winter	Nominated	
2015	NYIT Awards	Best Ensmeble	As You Like It	Nominated	
2015	NYIT Awards	Best Play	As You Like It	Nominated	
