= Tom Atkins (actor) =

American actor

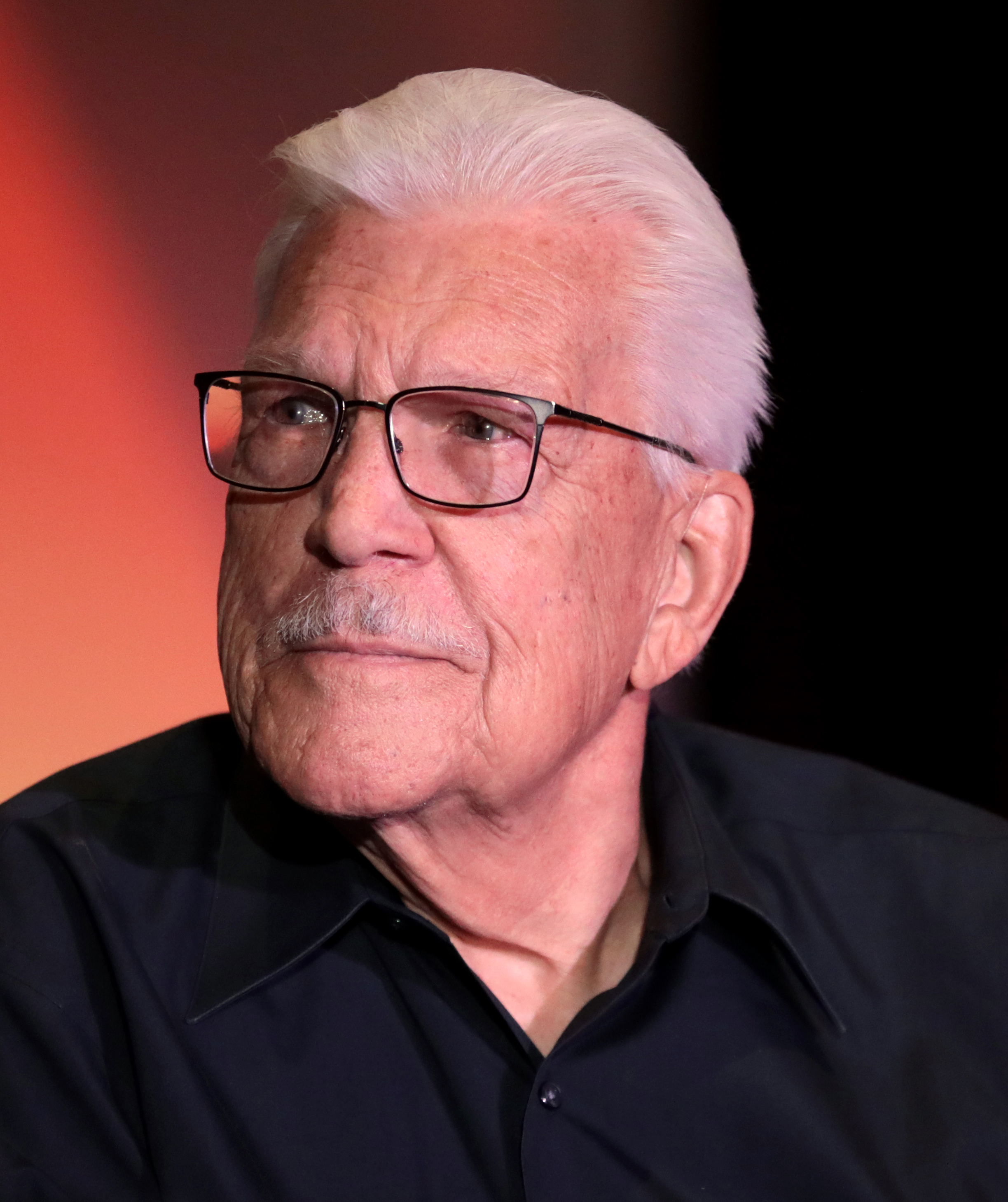
- Atkins in 2023
- Born: November 13, 1935 (age 90); Pittsburgh, Pennsylvania, U.S.
- Education: Duquesne University
- Occupation: Actor
- Years active: 1963–present
- Spouse: Garn Stephens (m. 1976; div. 1985) Janis Lee Rodgers (m. 1986)
- Children: 1
- Military career
- Allegiance: United States of America
- Branch: United States Navy

Tom Atkins (born November 13, 1935) is an American actor. He is known for his work in the horror and thriller film genres, having worked with writers and directors such as Shane Black, William Peter Blatty, John Carpenter, Fred Dekker, Richard Donner, Stephen King, and George A. Romero. He is also a familiar face to mainstream viewers, often playing police officers and tough authority figures and is perhaps best known for his role as Lt. Alex Diehl in The Rockford Files (1974–1977).

Atkins has appeared in numerous films including The Fog (1980), The Ninth Configuration (1980), Escape from New York (1981), Creepshow (1982), Halloween III: Season of the Witch (1982), Night of the Creeps (1986), Lethal Weapon (1987), Maniac Cop (1988), Two Evil Eyes (1990), Bob Roberts (1992), Striking Distance (1993), My Bloody Valentine 3D (2009), Drive Angry (2011), Encounter (2018), and Trick (2019).

Atkins has also appeared in numerous television series and films such as Hawaii Five-O (1975), Kojak: Flowers for Matty (1990), Walker, Texas Ranger (1993), Fortune Hunter (1994), Xena: Warrior Princess (1996), Homicide: Life on the Street (1998), Oz (2003), Law & Order: Criminal Intent (2003), The Jury (2004), The Last-Drive In with Joe Bob Briggs (2019), City on a Hill (2022), and Creepshow (2023).

== Early life ==
Atkins initially had no desire to be an actor. His father worked in a steel mill in Pennsylvania and Atkins assumed that he would follow in his father's footsteps. He enlisted in the United States Navy and "noticed that the officers lived great, but that was only because they had gone to college," and so, after leaving the Navy, Atkins enrolled in college where he met a girl who was involved in a theatre group. Atkins studied at Duquesne University in Pittsburgh and was a member of the Gamma Phi fraternity. He says: "I was in my 20s already when I got interested in acting and I liked it a lot."

== Career ==
Atkins began his career in stage plays both on-and-off Broadway, before moving to Los Angeles to pursue a career in film and television. His first movie role was in The Detective, which starred Frank Sinatra. Talking of his experience working on his first feature film – and with Sinatra – Atkins says: "It was great! It was intimidating and frightening and scary but Frank was great. He was very easy to work with. He didn't like to do a lot of takes. But then it's not like we were doing Shakespeare."

After appearing in TV series and movies, including portraying Lt. Alex Diehl in seasons 1 and 2 of The Rockford Files, Atkins began working within the horror and science fiction genres. He appeared in two films directed by John Carpenter: the 1980 ghost story The Fog and the 1981 science fiction thriller Escape from New York. His next role (this time a leading role) was the third installment of the Halloween franchise, the Carpenter-produced Halloween III: Season of the Witch (1982).

He completed further work with George A. Romero, appearing in three of the director's projects: the anthology Creepshow (1982), written by Stephen King; the anthology Two Evil Eyes (1990), based on tales by Edgar Allan Poe; and Bruiser (2000).

He portrayed Detective Ray Cameron in the 1986 cult horror film Night of the Creeps, a role Atkins calls his very favorite. He tells Classic-Horror magazine "It was the most fun film I've ever worked on. It was a pure giggle from beginning to end. The director Fred Dekker was very young and very talented and he went on to do The Monster Squad afterwards. I think he wrote a terrific film that was kind of a big put-on of '50s horror. And I had great lines in that movie!"

Atkins has continued to act in both the thriller and police procedural genre. He is well known to movie goers for his role as Michael Hunsaker in the Richard Donner film Lethal Weapon (1987), which stars Mel Gibson, Danny Glover, and Gary Busey. In 1993 he took a role in Striking Distance (1993) alongside Bruce Willis, Sarah Jessica Parker, and Tom Sizemore. In television, Atkins reprised his role of Commander Diehl for a series of Rockford Files movies during the 1990s.

Atkins is a frequent player in shows in the Pittsburgh theatre scene, most famously in the one-man show The Chief at Pittsburgh Public Theater, in which he depicted the late founder of the Pittsburgh Steelers, Art Rooney. Also at the Public, he played the title role in Macbeth, opposite Jean Smart as Lady Macbeth and Keith Fowler as Macduff. He was the star of A Musical Christmas Carol at the Pittsburgh Civic Light Opera, portraying the character of Ebenezer Scrooge. He appeared on Broadway in David Storey's The Changing Room, for which he received the 1973 Drama Desk Award for Most Promising Performer.

In 2009, he had a supporting role as a retired sheriff in the remake My Bloody Valentine 3D and co-starred with Nicolas Cage in Todd Farmer's Drive Angry, in 2011; both films are directed by Patrick Lussier.

In the 2018 sci-fi movie Encounter, he was Professor Westlake, who studied the biology of the alien lifeform.

== Filmography ==
=== Film ===
Year	Title	Role	Director	Notes	Ref.
1968	The Detective	Harmon	Gordon Douglas		
1970	Where's Poppa?	Policeman in Apartment	Carl Reiner		
1970	The Owl and the Pussycat	Kid in Car	Herbert Ross	Uncredited	
1976	Special Delivery	Cop On Beat	Paul Wendkos		
1980	The Fog	Nick Castle	John Carpenter		
1980	The Ninth Configuration	Sergeant Krebs	William Peter Blatty		
1981	Escape from New York	Captain Rehme	John Carpenter		
1982	Creepshow	Stan	George A. Romero	Segments: "Prologue" / "Epilogue", Uncredited	
1982	Halloween III: Season of the Witch	Dr. Dan Challis	Tommy Lee Wallace		
1985	The New Kids	"Mac" MacWilliams	Sean S. Cunningham		
1986	Night of the Creeps	Ray Cameron	Fred Dekker		
1987	Lethal Weapon	Michael Hunsaker	Richard Donner		
1988	Maniac Cop	Detective Frank McCrae	William Lustig		
1990	Two Evil Eyes	Detective Grogan	George A. Romero, Dario Argento	Segment: "The Facts in the Case of Mr. Valdemar"	
1992	Bob Roberts	Dr. Caleb Menck	Tim Robbins		
1993	Striking Distance	Uncle Hardy	Rowdy Herrington		
2000	Bruiser	Detective McCleary	George A. Romero		
2001	Out of the Black	Eugene Carter	Karl Kozak		
2002	Turn of Faith	Charlie Ryan	Charles Jarrott		
2009	My Bloody Valentine 3D	Sheriff Jim Burke	Patrick Lussier		
2009	Shannon's Rainbow	Captain Martin	Frank E. Johnson		
2009	Trapped	Detective Abbott	Ron Hankison, Gavin Rapp		
2010	The Chief	Art Rooney Sr.	Steve Parys		
2011	Drive Angry	Captain	Patrick Lussier		
2011	Arriving at Night	Phil Redman	Andrew Ford	Short Film	
2014	Apocalypse Kiss	Captain John Vogle	Christian Grillo		
2014	Judy's Dead	Roy	Dave Rodkey		
2018	Encounter	Professor Westlake	Paul Salamoff		
2019	Trick	Talbott	Patrick Lussier		
2020	Polybius	Sheriff Atkins	Jimmy Kelly	Short film	

=== Television ===
Year	Title	Role	Notes	Ref.
1963	The Doctors	Dylan Levein	Episode: "December 9, 1963"	
1964	Look Up and Live	Doctor	Episode: "A Lifetime of Service"	
1974	Get Christie Love!	Peterson	Episode: "Market for Murder"	
1974	Rhoda	Vic Rhodes	Episode: "Pop Goes the Question"	
1974	Harry O	Sergeant Frank Cole	5 episodes	
1975	Miles to Go Before I Sleep	O'Dell	Television film	
1975	Shell Game	Stoker Frye	Television film	
1975	The Rookies	Brad Gifford	Episode: "Lamb to the Slaughter"	
1975	Hawaii Five-O	Koko Apaleka	Episode: "Sing a Song of Suspense"	
1976	Visions	Robert Dayka	Episode: "Pennsylvania Lynch"	
1976–1977	Serpico	Lieutenant Tom Sullivan	16 episodes	
1974–1977	The Rockford Files	Lieutenant Thomas Diehl	8 episodes	
1977	Baretta	Vic	Episode: "It Goes with the Job"	
1977	Tarantulas: The Deadly Cargo	Buddy	Television film	
1978	A Death in Canaan	Lieutenant Bragdon	Television film	
1980	Skag	Dr. Moscone	Episode: "Pilot"	
1980	Power	Buck Buchanan	Television film	
1981	Sherlock Holmes	Craigin	Television film	
1979–1981	Lou Grant	Dr. Sorenson / Jim Bronsky / Frank Durning	3 episodes	
1982	M*A*S*H	Major Lawrence Weems	Episode: "The Tooth Shall Set You Free"	
1982	Desperate Lives	John Cameron	Television film	
1982	Quincy, M.E.	Commander Gene Butler / John Todd	2 episodes	
1982	Skeezer	Dr. Chanless	Television film	
1983	St. Elsewhere	Bob Lonnicker	Episode: "Dog Day Hospital"	
1983	Murder Me, Murder You	Jack Vance	Television film	
1984	T.J. Hooker	Phil Parker / Tommy D'Amico	Episode: "Hooker's Run"	
1985	The Fall Guy	George Spiros	Episode: "The Skip Family Robinson"	
1986	Alfred Hitchcock Presents	Police Lieutenant	Episode: "Beast in View"	
1986	Blind Justice	Kramer	Television film	
1986	Stingray	Donald Dixon	Episode: "Sometimes You Gotta Sing the Blues"	
1986	Spenser: For Hire	Hatch	Episode: "White Knight"	
1986	The Equalizer	Demonstrator (uncredited)	Episode: "Pretenders"	
1987	A Stranger Waits	Sheriff Collier	Television film	
1987	The Equalizer	Detective Frank Standish	Episode: "Blood & Wine"	
1988	Lemon Sky	Douglas	Television film	
1989	Dead Man Out	Burger	Television film	
1989	The Heist	Detective Leland	Television film	
1990	Against the Law	Walter Littlefield	Episode: "Pilot"	
1991	Cry in the Wild: The Taking of Peggy Ann	Jamieson	Television film	
1992	What She Doesn't Know	Roy	Television film	
1993	Sworn to Vengeance	Ed Barry	Television film	
1993	Walker, Texas Ranger	Wade Cantrell	Episode: "Night of the Gladiator"	
1994	Fortune Hunter	Richard Bennett	Episode: "Target: Millennium"	
1996	The Rockford Files: If the Frame Fits	Commander Alex Diehl	Television film	
1996	Xena: Warrior Princess	Atrius	Episode: "Ties That Bind"	
1996	Dying to be Perfect: The Ellen Hart Pena Story	Henry Hart	Television film	
1998	Homicide: Life on the Street	Grenville Rawlins	Episode: "The Twenty Percent Solution"	
1999	The Rockford Files: If It Bleeds ... It Leads	Commander Alex Diehl	Television film	
2003	Oz	Mayor Wilson Lowen	2 episodes	
2003	Law & Order: Criminal Intent	Mr. Monahan	Episode: "Cold Comfort"	
2004	The Jury	Boyd Kingman	Episode: "Mail Order Mystery"	
2022	City on a Hill	Joe Congemi	2 episodes	
2023	Creepshow	Frank Cochran	Episode: "Something Borrowed, Something Blue"	

=== Self ===
Year	Title	Notes	Ref.
2006	Halloween: 25 years of Terror	Video Documentary	
2007	Just Desserts: The Making of Creepshow	Video Documentary	
2009	My Bloody Valentine: Sex, Blood and Screams – The Make-Up Effects	Video Documentary Short	
2009	Thrill Me!: The Making of Night of the Creeps	Video Documentary	
2009	Night of the Creeps: Tom Atkins, Man of Action	Video Documentary Short	
2011	Doomed Detective: Tom Atkins on Maniac Cop	Video Documentary	
2012	Stand Alone: The Making of Halloween III: Season of the Witch	Video Short	
2013	Fantasm	Documentary	
2015	Smoke and Mirrors: The Story of Tom Savini	Documentary	
2016	Creepshow Days with Michael Gornick	Video Short	
2016	Horror's Hallowed Grounds	Episode: "Creepshow"	
2019	The Last Drive-In with Joe Bob Briggs	Episode: "Halloween Hootenanny: Halloween 5: The Revenge of Michael Meyers"	
2019	In Search of Darkness	Documentary	
2020	In Search of Darkness: Part II	Documentary	

=== Archive footage ===
Year	Title	Role	Notes	Ref.
2011–2014	Cinemassacre's Monster Madness	Ray Cameron / Dr. Dan Challis	2 episodes	
2014–2019	Welcome to the Basement	Ray Cameron / Sergeant Krebs	2 episodes	
