= Cryptid (film) =

- Theatrical release poster
- Directed by: Brad Rego
- Written by: Brad Rego
- Produced by: Joe Barbagallo; Eunice Marigliano; Brad Rego
- Starring: Ellen Adair; Kate MacCluggage; Kevin O'Rourke; Nicholas Baroudi
- Cinematography: Kevin Provost
- Edited by: Crystal House
- Music by: Spencer Bambrick; Louisa Mariette Byron; Ben Lipkin; Gina Zdanowicz
- Production companies: BarBHouse; 221 Films
- Distributed by: Filmhub (U.S.) Octane Multimedia (non-U.S.)
- Release date: October 7, 2022
- Running time: 114 minutes
- Country: United States
- Language: English
- Budget: $550,000

Cryptid is a 2022 American horror film written and directed by Brad Rego. The film screened at the 2022 Shockfest Film Festival, and was distributed through Octane Multimedia. The cast includes Ellen Adair, Kate MacCluggage, Kevin O'Rourke, and Nicholas Baroudi.

Set amidst a quiet, rural town in Maine, residents are horrified when a local is found savagely torn apart by an unknown creature. While town officials dismiss the incident as a random bear attack, two journalists begin to suspect a more sinister explanation.

Cryptid received mostly positive reviews from critics.

== Plot ==
In a small town in rural Maine, a local man is found brutally killed in the woods, his body torn apart. Authorities attribute the death to a rogue bear attack, but freelance journalist Max (Nicholas Baroudi) suspects otherwise. Alongside his colleague, photojournalist Harriet (Ellen Adair), the pair begins investigating the incident. As more animals and people are found mutilated, the pair uncovers a pattern of attacks that defy conventional explanation.

Despite resistance from town officials and local law enforcement, Max and Harriet follow the evidence into the surrounding forests and wetlands. Their search leads them to a terrifying discovery: a large, reptilian creature—possibly a cryptid—hiding in the wilderness. As the attacks escalate, the journalists find themselves in a desperate race to uncover the truth and survive a final, deadly encounter with the monster.

== Cast ==
- Ellen Adair as Harriet
- Nicholas Baroudi as Max
- Chopper Bernet as Sheriff Charlie Murdoch
- Kevin O'Rourke as Darren Wilmore
- Eric Gilde as Deputy Sonny Wright
- Kate MacCluggage as Marie Dobson
- Emme Burchardt as Creature
- Jeanine Bartel as Dr. Diane Matthews
- Paul Weissman as John Pendleton
- Sarah Feldman as Kelly
- Amy Fiebke as Beth
- Chris Keating as Mayor Tom Winston
- Jim Malloy as Game Warden
- Arthur T. Neiman III as Tommy
- Vivian Nesbitt as Ada
- Gerard J. Savoy as Bill King
- Linda Thorburn as Helen
- Jane West as Store Clerk

== Production ==
Cryptid was meant to start filming on April 6, 2020, but was delayed six months by the onset of the COVID-19 pandemic and the subsequent industry shutdown. Production resumed on October 1, 2020.

Despite being set in Maine, filming took place in Greenfield, Mount Washington, North Adams, Shelburne Falls, and Williamstown, Massachusetts; Stephentown, New York; and Pownal, Vermont.

The fictional newspaper where Max and Harriet work, The Trenton Record, was originally called The Trenton Post. The name was changed as tribute to the real-life Greenfield Recorder who allowed production use of their newsroom while filming.

== Release ==
Cryptid was acquired by Octane Multimedia for limited theatrical release in North American, beginning October 7, 2022. The film subsequently screened at the Adirondack Film Festival on October 15, 2022, the Another Hole in the Head Genre Film Festival on December 4, 2022, and the Shockfest Film Festival on December 10, 2022.

The film was released via VOD on Apple TV and Amazon Prime Video in the United States, and via streaming on Tubi on January 3, 2023. Cryptid was later released on DVD on February 7, 2023.

== Reception ==
Many reviewers lauded the films' "old style" feel, as well as the strength of the ensemble.

In a review for HorrorBuzz, critic Norman Gidney awarded the film a score of 7/10, praising Cryptid as "A well-crafted movie that served horror, drama, and creature all on the same plate... Despite a few faults, Cryptid is a well-crafted movie that served horror, drama, and creature all on the same plate. It could have been tightened up a bit but folks, keep your eye on Rego. He understands Story, he knows how to pick a take, and he doesn’t waste the audience’s time."

In a review for Film Threat, critic Michael Talbot-Haynes awarded the film a score of 6/10, writing "That Rego seeks to reenact the bad monster movies of yesteryear is most welcomed by those who remember back in the day. So while some may find the pacing slow, others are going to find it very relaxing. Cryptid is the cinematic equivalent of comfort food, with the soothing feel of childhood memories and no nutrition at all."

In a more mixed review for Dread Central, critic Sharai Bohannon noted "One of the reasons this movie was on my must-see list is that the trailer left me feeling nostalgic. It also left me wanting answers. After some digging, I discovered the "Creature" was played by Emme Burchardt and moved it higher up my watch list. I mean, how often do we get monsters not played by cishet dudes? Sadly, at the end of the hour and fifty-four minutes, I found a movie that felt familiar but bloated... This movie cuts off its dynamite at every turn which makes it hard to have a good time as a viewer. It's also a very long journey for so little reward."

== Awards ==
Year	Association	Category	Nominee	Result	Ref.
2022	Adirondack Film Festival	Best of the Fest	Brad Rego	Won	
2022	Adirondack Film Festival	Best Narrative Feature Film	Brad Rego	Won	
2022	Another Hole in the Head Genre Film Festival	Best Action/Adventure Feature Film	Brad Rego	Won	
2022	Shockfest Film Festival	Best Feature Film	Brad Rego	Nominated	
2022	Shockfest Film Festival	Best Director	Brad Rego	Won	
