= Love and Communication =

- Theatrical release poster
- Directed by: James J. Christy
- Written by: James J. Christy
- Produced by: Rob Margolies; Kevin Granahan; Zinarta Judea Cruse
- Starring: Lev Gorn; Briana Evigan; Ryan Kennedy; Ellen Adair; Nikkole Salter
- Cinematography: Eddie Bernard
- Edited by: James J. Christy
- Music by: Tom Devaney
- Production companies: LAC Productions; Different Duck Films; Luber Roklin Entertainment
- Distributed by: Studio Dome
- Release date: 23 April 2022 (AIFF)
- Running time: 78 minutes
- Country: United States
- Language: English

Love and Communication is a 2022 American drama film written and directed by James J. Christy, based on his 2011 stage play of the same name. The film premiered in competition at the Arizona International Film Festival, and was distributed internationally through Studio Dome. The cast includes Lev Gorn, Briana Evigan, Ryan Kennedy, Ellen Adair, and Nikkole Salter.

Love and Communication follows a young couple navigating the challenges of raising a son recently diagnosed with autism. As they become embroiled in a battle with their school district over his education, the tension begins to take a toll on their marriage.

== Plot ==
Megan and Rob Holden are a young couple whose lives are upended when their son, Samuel, is diagnosed with autism. As they confront an unyielding school district, their options diverge sharply: Megan places her hope in a new, relationship-based therapy promoted by a charismatic online figure, while Rob resorts to increasingly desperate and extreme means to secure Samuel a spot in an elite private school. Their intense efforts not only strain their marriage but also threaten the bond with their beloved son.

== Cast ==
- Lev Gorn as Silverman
- Briana Evigan as Megan
- Ryan Kennedy as Rob
- Ellen Adair as Julia
- Nikkole Salter as Regina
- Ariel Shafir as Ephraim
- Crystal Sha'nae as Annette
- Damon Bonetti as Donato
- Joshua T. Crockett as Willis
- Zinarta as Molly
- Eric Gilde as Stepansky
- Sam Gray as Diana
- Sarah Nedwek as Colleen
- Hilary Greer as Joan
- Emperor Kaioyus as James

== Reception ==
The film received mostly positive reviews, with critics praising the strength of the ensemble and Christy's handling of sensitive subject matter.

In a review for Film Threat, critic Alan Ng praised the film writing "Love and Communication is not the film I expected—it’s better. It doesn’t attempt to simplify or solve autism but instead focuses on how far two parents will go, even crossing ethical lines, to give their son the best chance. Thanks to smart writing and compelling performances, the film offers a sincere, sometimes uncomfortable, and always honest portrait of what it takes to advocate for your child in a world full of uncertainty."

In a more mixed review from Movies Thru the Spectrum, Al Alexander awarded the film a C+, noting "Give Christy credit for opening our eyes to the mountains of red tape parents of autistic children must cut through to ensure the best path for their child. It’s heartbreaking. I would have preferred he’d accomplished it with a more subtle approach. These are important issues that deserve a less tawdry setting. But perhaps being bold is what it takes to draw attention to the hoops parents must jump through to provide for their kids."

== Awards ==
Year	Association	Category	Nominee	Result	Ref.
2022	Arizona International Film Festival	Best Dramatic Feature	James J. Christy	Nominated	
2022	Louisville's International Festival of Film	Best Feature	James J. Christy	Nominated	
2022	New Hope International Film Festival	Audience Choice Award	James J. Christy	Won	
2022	New Hope International Film Festival	Indie Spirit Award	James J. Christy	Won	
