= Virginia Oliver =

American lobster fisherwoman (1920–2026)

- Born: June 6, 1920; Rockland, Maine, U.S.
- Died: January 21, 2026 (aged 105); Rockport, Maine, U.S.
- Children: 4

Virginia "Ginny" Oliver (June 6, 1920 – January 21, 2026) was an American lobster fisherwoman.

== Life and career ==
Virginia Oliver was born June 6, 1920, in Rockland, Maine, and grew up "on the Neck, a small island connected by a tidal sandbar" to Andrews Island. Oliver began lobstering at age eight alongside her father and older brother. At the time, few women were lobster fishers in Maine. During the schoolyear, she lived with an aunt in Rockland.

Virginia married Bill Oliver, a lobsterman from Spruce Head. The couple had four children, and Virginia was a stay at home mother until her youngest child was nine. She worked at a sardine factory and spent 19 years at a printing press in Rockland, but "decided lobstering, I wouldn’t have to work half as hard, and I could be my own boss". She began daily lobster fishing with Bill in the early 1970s. After Bill's retirement, Virginia worked on her son Max's lobster boat beginning in 2005 until he retired at age 80. The two would lobster three days a week during the fishing season, waking up at 3 am.

She gained media attention around her 100th birthday, with outlets calling her the county's oldest lobster fisher.

Oliver stopped lobstering at age 103, after a fall. She continued to renew her commercial lobster fishing licence, with her last licence expiring in December 2025.

On January 21, 2026, Oliver died at Pen Bay Hospital in Rockport, Maine, at the age of 105.

== In media ==
In 2019, a documentary about Oliver, Conversations with the Lobster Lady, was aired on PBS.

Two children's books have been published about Oliver's life: the first in 2022 by journalist Barbara Walsh, and the second, The Lobster Lady, in 2023 by Bangor author Alexandra S.D. Hinrichs and Peaks Island illustrator Jamie Hogan.
