= Womb (disambiguation) =

The womb is a major female hormone-responsive reproductive sex organ of most mammals.

Womb may also refer to:

- Womb (nightclub), in Tokyo, Japan
- Womb (2010 film), a science fiction drama film
- Womb (2025 film), an American horror film
- Womb (album), a 2020 album by Purity Ring
- Womb, a cultivar of Karuka
- Wombs (manga), a Japanese series by Yumiko Shirai
- "Womb", a song by Apparatus from Apparatus
- "Womb", a song by Melanie Martinez from Portals
- The Womb, a 2022 horror film
