= Alton H. Blackington =

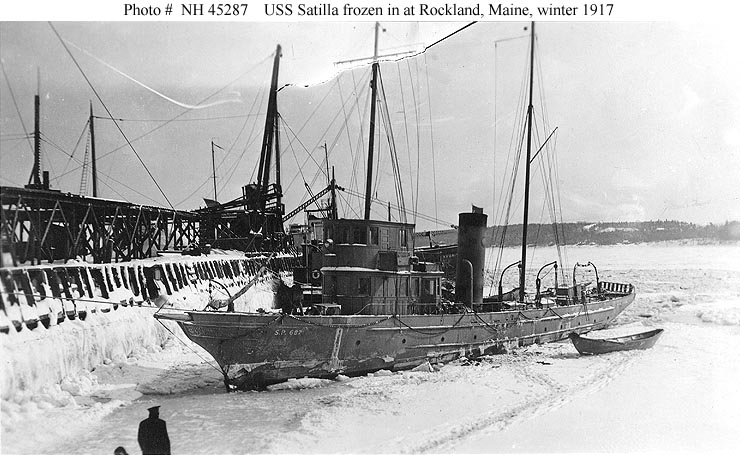
Alton H. Blackington photo of the United States Navy patrol vessel USS Satilla (SP-687) frozen in the ice at the Rockland Section Base at Rockland, Maine from late 1917

Alton H. Blackington (1898–1963) was a photographer, writer, radio personality, and television show host known for his features on life in New England. He was known as Blackie. Described as a "dyed-in-the-wool Yankee", he was a chronicler of New England lore and legend. His extensive photo collection included many shots from New England, as well as others from his travels abroad. His collection also includes photos to the American Southwest, and the ones he collected through his photo company.

Blackington was born in Rockland, Maine. He served in the Navy during World War I.

In 1919 be joined the Boston Herald where he wrote features about New England for 10 years. He eventually established a photo company and became a lecturer and radio show host. He is responsible for capturing disturbing pictures of racial terror lynching in the South, most famously the public torture and murder of Lloyd Warner in 1933 in St. Joseph, Missouri.

He wrote his two "Yankee Yarns" books, Yankee Yarns (1954) and More Yankee Yarns (1956), and took his Yankee Yarns storytelling to television at NBC. He was awarded a posthumous Yankee Quill Award in 1981.
