= Reid MacCluggage =

American journalist

- Born: ca. 1938 (age 79); Norwich, Connecticut, United States
- Education: 61' University of Hartford (BA)
- Occupations: Journalist, editor, publisher, & playwright
- Years active: 40 years (1961–2001)
- Employer(s): The Hartford Courant reporter (1961–1968) and editor (1968–1984),The Day (New London) (1984–2001)
- Known for: promoting racial diversity in the news media
- Spouse: Linda H. MacCluggage
- Children: Kate, Stewart & Scot.
- Awards: Ida B. Wells Award Winner (2001), Connecticut Society of Professional Journalists’ Hall of Fame, Yankee Quill Award, University of Hartford Distinguished Alumnus Award.

Reid MacCluggage (born ca. 1938), an American journalist, editor, and publisher for The Day in New London, Connecticut, United States, started his career with The Hartford Courant and rose to become its managing editor of the news until he left in 1984 for The Day. While at The Day, he was known for promoting high standards in the small-circulation newspaper, skepticism in reporting and editing, and racial diversity in the news media. He received the Ida B. Wells Award in 2001 and was inducted into the Connecticut Society of Professional Journalists’ Hall of Fame.

== Personal ==
Reid MacCluggage was born circa 1938 in Norwich, Connecticut. He graduated from the University of Hartford in 1961. He is married to Linda H. MacCluggage. They lived in Hartford, Groton and Old Saybrook, Connecticut and Englewood and Sarasota, Florida. They have a daughter Kate and two sons, Stewart and Scot. His current residence is Sarasota, Florida.

== Career ==
After graduation from the University of Hartford, MacCluggage took a job as a reporter with The Hartford Courant. Seven years later, in 1968, MacCluggage became the state editor. MacCluggage rose to assistant managing editor in 1974 and became managing editor in 1982. He left for The Day in 1984. (New London).

After 23 years with The Hartford Courant, MacCluggage resigned in 1984 to become publisher and editor of The Day of New London. During his time at The Day, he increased the business, sports, and editorial sections, added an arts and regional section, and changed from afternoon to morning publication. MacCluggage raised quality standards, introduced stronger recruitment, and increased the amount of investigative reporting. On July 15, 2001, after eighteen years, it was announced that he was retiring from The Day.

He also served as the president of the Associated Press Managing Editors Association, a juror of The Pulitzer Prizes and a seminar leader at the American Press Institute.

In honor of MacCluggage's commitment to multicultural awareness, the New London Maritime Society created the Reid MacCluggage Black Maritime History Scholarship to focus on the experience of African-Americans in maritime history.

After retiring from journalism, MacCluggage began writing short plays and is working on a novel. His play, Down Goes Rocky, won third place in a juried competition in New York City. The play ran for a month in a Greenwich Village festival.

== Notable works of journalism ==
Reid MacClaggage worked for The Day in New London, Connecticut.

The New York Times published an article December 20, 1998, about The Day under the headline "New London's Feisty Newspaper, The Day."

== Context ==
Reid MacCluggage to the Associated Press Managing Editors Association in 1998: "Edit more skeptically. If skeptics aren't built into the process right from the start, stories will slide onto Page One without the proper scrutiny. If stories hold up on the witness stand, under rigorous cross-examination by tough editors, they will hold up under any assault."

Elsewhere MacCluggage wrote, "Our biggest weakness is not the occasional dishonest reporter. Our weakness is unchallenged information." He focuses on the challenges journalists make by saying "some of our reporting and editing has been deeply flawed." He explains how journalists can improve by suggesting to "edit more skeptically, tighten standards, prosecute the story, and assign a naysayer."

MacCluggage believed that fostering diversity among the staff of a newspaper would raise the quality of the newspaper. He was quoted as saying, "more diverse backgrounds and mindsets within the newsroom might foster a more questioning approach . . ." He advocated training journalists to be "devil's advocates and contrarians."

== Impact ==
MacClugguge improved The Day by increasing the business, sports, and editorial sections, added an arts and regional section, and changed from afternoon to morning publication. He also added a Neighbors section to improve coverage of local news.

In 2002, MacCluggage encouraged The Community Foundation of Southeastern Connecticut to establish funding to promote the joy of reading among youngster in the community. He donated a gift in honor of Let's Read.

== Reactions ==
While receiving the award in 2007 for his play "Down Goes Rocky," MacCluggage said that even though the play is considered a comedy its theme is "disinformation and how a politician’s handlers and spin doctors clean up and varnish the truth for public consumption."

== Awards ==
- MacCluggage was the Ida B. Wells Award Winner (2001) for promoting racial diversity in the workplace.
- Connecticut Society of Professional Journalists’ Hall of Fame
- University of Hartford Distinguished Alumnus Award
- Yankee Quill Award

== See also ==
- National Association of Black Journalists Hall of Fame
