= Messengers 2: The Scarecrow =

- Official DVD cover
- Directed by: Martin Barnewitz
- Written by: Todd Farmer
- Based on: The Messengers by Todd Farmer
- Produced by: Andrew Pfeffer
- Starring: Norman Reedus; Heather Stephens; Claire Holt; Michael McCoy; Erbi Ago; Richard Riehle; Matthew McNulty
- Cinematography: Lorenzo Senatore
- Edited by: Matt Michael
- Music by: Joseph LoDuca
- Production companies: Ghost House Pictures; Stage 6 Films
- Distributed by: Sony Pictures Home Entertainment
- Release date: July 21, 2009
- Running time: 94 minutes
- Country: United States
- Language: English

Messengers 2: The Scarecrow is a 2009 American supernatural horror film, starring Norman Reedus, Claire Holt, and Erbi Ago. The film serves as a prequel to/contradictory remake of The Messengers. It was directed by Martin Barnewitz, and was released direct-to-video on DVD and Blu-ray on July 21, 2009.

== Plot ==
The film opens with a woman running through the corn fields from an unseen foe, who kills her.

John, the head of the Rollins family, struggles to save his farm and hold his family together. He is in debt, the corn fields are dying out because the irrigation system is not working, and crows are eating the cobs. His friend, a financial adviser, is trying to convince him to sell the land albeit for his own convenience. One day, John discovers a secret door in his barn, where he finds a strange scarecrow. After placing it in the field, his luck changes, but this also activates a horrific curse that started it all. While crops begin to grow, he begins to find dead birds in the field as well as a little girl who appears out of nowhere.

Several people begin dying, including the financial adviser. John encounters a new neighbor, Jude Weatherby, who seems to know more than he appears to about the scarecrow. John burns the scarecrow at the cost of missing his therapy session with his wife, damaging their relationship further. He goes to Jude for advice, and meets Jude's wife Miranda instead. Miranda drugs John and rapes him. John feels guilty, made no better by his wife believing that he is cheating on her.

John realizes his family has forsaken him for not living up to his promises, then discovers that Jude and Miranda are the ghosts of the farm's former owners. They had evoked a voodoo curse to aid them, and tell John that he must let the scarecrow kill his family. The scarecrow does whatever is necessary to safeguard the land and ensure its master's crops reach their potential. It will destroy anyone who gets in the way of this, and seeing that John's family is a distraction to his farming, the scarecrow targets them.

John's wife suspects that John assaulted the sheriff and killed the other men who died. Believing he has gone mad, she attempts to get her children out. Her young son, Michael, who has been aware of the scarecrow all along, goes to aid his father, and the rest see the scarecrow come to life. The Scarecrow kills the sheriff and attacks the Rollins' daughter. John manages to subdue the Scarecrow and Michael runs it over with the tractor. The family then destroys the scarecrow. The movie ends with strange little girl taking the scarecrows and its remains back to the secret room where John first found it.

== Cast ==
- Norman Reedus as John Rollins
- Heather Stephens as Mary Rollins, John's wife
- Claire Holt as Lindsay Rollins, John & Mary's daughter
- Richard Riehle as Jude Weatherby
- Darcy Fowers as Miranda Weatherby, Jude's wife
- Matthew McNulty as Deputy Milton
- Laurence Belcher as Michael Rollins, John & Mary's son and Lindsay's younger brother
- Erbi Ago as Randy
- Michael McCoy as Mr. Peterson
- Vladimir Yossifov as the scarecrow

== Production ==
Filming began in April 2008 in Sofia, Bulgaria. Martin Barnewitz was attached to direct.

== Reception ==
Like its predecessor, the film was panned by critics.
