= Drive Angry =

2011 film by Patrick Lussier

- Theatrical release poster
- Directed by: Patrick Lussier
- Written by: Todd Farmer; Patrick Lussier
- Produced by: Michael De Luca; René Besson; Adam Fields
- Starring: Nicolas Cage; Amber Heard; William Fichtner; Billy Burke; Charlotte Ross; Christa Campbell; Tom Atkins; Katy Mixon; Jack McGee; Todd Farmer; David Morse
- Cinematography: Brian Pearson
- Edited by: Patrick Lussier; Devin C. Lussier
- Music by: Michael Wandmacher
- Production companies: Nu Image; Saturn Films; Michael De Luca Production
- Distributed by: Summit Entertainment
- Release date: February 25, 2011
- Running time: 104 minutes
- Country: United States
- Language: English
- Budget: $45-50 million
- Box office: $40.9 million

Drive Angry (alternatively titled Drive Angry 3D) is a 2011 American action horror film in the exploitation cinema tradition, directed by Patrick Lussier, who co-wrote it with Todd Farmer. The film stars Nicolas Cage, Amber Heard, William Fichtner, Billy Burke, Charlotte Ross, Katy Mixon, and Tom Atkins. Photographed in stereoscopic 3D, the film was released on February 25, 2011 by Summit Entertainment to mixed reviews from critics and grossing $40.9 million against a $45–50 million budget.

== Plot ==
After interrogating and killing some of Satanist Jonah King's followers in Colorado, John Milton discovers that the ritual killing of his granddaughter will happen in a place called Stillwater Marsh. John has recently escaped from Hell to rescue his granddaughter, who is being held by the same cult who killed his wife and daughter, as they believe the sacrifice will unleash Hell on Earth.

On his way to find Stillwater Marsh, he stops by a diner, where he meets Piper Lee, a recently engaged waitress. Her co-worker tells John that Stillwater Marsh is a prison in Louisiana. Milton sabotages Piper's 1969 Dodge Charger, then offers to fix it in exchange for a ride.

Piper walks in on her fiance, Frank, cheating on her. Piper beats the woman, tosses her outside, assaults Frank, who knocks her unconscious. Milton comes to Piper's aid and "borrows" Frank's Dodge Charger, taking Piper with him to Stillwater.

Satan's operative, the Accountant, has arrived on Earth with the mission to retrieve Milton and the Godkiller weapon John stole. The Accountant tracks John to Piper and Frank's. He interrogates Frank and discovers Milton's destination. After killing Frank, he poses as an FBI agent, tricking a pair of state troopers into helping him.

Stopping at a busy bar and motel establishment, Milton has sex with Candy, a waitress from the bar. King and his men attack, and Milton violently dispatches them with many rounds of gunfire, leaving the naked and terrified waitress traumatized. The Accountant and police arrive, ignoring King, to split up and search for Milton. There is a shootout leaving the troopers and Milton shot. The Accountant watches Milton and Piper, leave in pursuit of King.

Milton uses the Godkiller to shoot at the Accountant, causing him to drive off a bridge. They follow King to a church, find it filled with King's Satan worshipers, and are ambushed and captured by the cult. They kidnap Piper and shoot Milton in the eye. He awakens, kills King's remaining cult members, and pursues the RV in the Charger. Piper breaks free, fights King, and jumps through the RV's shattered window onto the Charger's hood while King disables the engine by emptying his gun into it.

Meanwhile, one of King's surviving men tells the Accountant why Milton is chasing them. Piper and Webster discover Milton is undead as Webster reveals that he was a pallbearer at Milton’s funeral when he died 10 years earlier in a shootout. Webster gives Milton a 1971 Chevrolet Chevelle SS 454. After arming himself, Milton tells Webster to stay behind and warns Piper, but Piper says that she has never before had a worthy cause to fight for and is with him regardless of the consequences.

With the sudden help of the now-intrigued Accountant, they evade the sheriff's troopers and arrive at Stillwater Marsh. Outside of Stillwater, the Accountant captures Piper and forces Milton to surrender the Godkiller before he battles King. He allows Milton to attempt to save his granddaughter, as it is easier than stopping him, while mentioning that Satan despises the murder of children in his name.

While Milton slaughters King's men before they can sacrifice his grandchild, Piper escapes from the Accountant with the Godkiller. King eventually gets the upper hand on Milton and savagely beats him. Piper fires the Godkiller at King, but misses, knocking herself out. King is enraged when another follower refuses to sacrifice the infant. The Accountant attracts King's attention, allowing Milton to grab the Godkiller and obliterate King and his soul, permanently.

The Accountant retrieves the infant and allows Milton to say goodbye to his granddaughter. Milton gives her to Piper, who promises to always care for her. Webster arrives and looks on as Milton "dies". After both Piper and Webster have left, Milton makes good on his earlier promise to Webster and drinks a beer from what remains of King's skull. He agrees to return to Hell, promising to escape again if his punishment remains too severe. The Accountant says that he looks forward to that escape. The Accountant manifests a black 1957 Chevrolet Bel Air and Milton drives them both back into Hell.

== Cast ==
- Nicolas Cage as John Milton, returns from Hell after 10 years to save his granddaughter. He steals Satan's personal gun, the Godkiller, to delay the Accountant. He does not mind the pain that he suffers in Hell, but finds being forced to watch the video feed of his daughter's murder to be intolerable.
- Amber Heard as Piper Lee, is a waitress at a local bar, and has a cheating fiancé whom she abandons to join with Milton to save his granddaughter.
- William Fichtner as the Accountant, is Satan's somewhat arrogant assistant. He was assigned to return Milton back to Hell and notes that sometimes, he needs to return escaped souls. He possesses a coin, which he can use to kill or transform into an FBI badge to assist his impersonation.
- David Morse as Webster
- Katy Mixon as Norma Jean
- Charlotte Ross as Candy
- Christa Campbell as Mona Elkins
- Pruitt Taylor Vince as Roy
- Todd Farmer as Frank Raimi
- Tom Atkins as Captain
- Jack McGee as Lou "Fat Lou"
- Billy Burke as Jonah King, a ruthless Satanist who believes that sacrificing Milton's granddaughter will bring Hell back to Earth and that he will be immortal. (The Accountant denies this, saying that Satan himself dislikes satanists.)

== Production ==
Cage stated that he was originally drawn to the project by a scene in which his character's eyes get shot out. In his previous film, Season of the Witch, he had wanted to have such a scene, but producers rejected the idea.

The film was shot in 3D, and special effects were created by Gary J. Tunnicliffe. The cameras were rented from Paradise FX. One reason Cage chose this film was to be part of the new 3D technology.

The three cars driven by Cage in the film are a 1964 Buick Riviera, a 1969 Dodge Charger R/T (440 Engine), and a 1971 Chevrolet Chevelle SS 454. Writer/director Patrick Lussier said the Riviera, used at the beginning and the end, "was the car we wished we had used the most, because it was a beautiful driving car", but "It was a shame to smack it up". Three Chargers and three Chevelles were used, with one made very safe for the stunts, and one intended to be shown close to being destroyed.

Patrick Lussier wrote the film with Todd Farmer. Lussier filmed the movie in Minden, Plain Dealing, and Shreveport, Louisiana.

== Release ==
=== Box office ===
The film was released in the US on February 25, 2011. Footage premiered on July 23, 2010, as part of San Diego Comic-Con. It opened at the ninth place within the box-office rankings at $1.6 million on Friday, with a lower-than-expected $5 million weekend. Drive Angry's box-office performance made it the lowest-grossing opening of a 3D film released in more than 2,000 US theaters. The film was slightly more successful in international markets, earning $30.3 million.

=== Home media ===
Drive Angry was released on DVD, Blu-ray, and 3D Blu-ray on May 31, 2011.

== Reception ==
=== Critical response ===
On the review aggregator website Rotten Tomatoes, the film has an approval rating of 46% based on reviews from 123 critics, with an average rating of 5.4 out of 10. The website's "Critics Consensus" says: "It may deliver the over-the-top action pieces, but Drive Angry prefers to work safely within the grindhouse formula than do something truly unique". On Metacritic the film has a score of 44 out of 100, based on reviews from 21 critics, indicating "mixed or average" reviews. Audiences polled by CinemaScore gave the film a grade of C+ on a scale from A to F.

Mark Jenkins from The Washington Post wrote, "Even at its most lurid, though, the movie is a little dull. And it only gets less compelling as the back story fills in". Roger Ebert of the Chicago Sun-Times gave the film 2 out of 4 and called it "an exercise in deliberate vulgarity, gross excess, and the pornography of violence, not to forget garden-variety pornography. You get your money's worth". Elizabeth Weitzman from the New York Daily News wrote, "Drive Angry is pure grindhouse, so committed to its own junkiness that it is, in its way, a pleasure to behold". Writing for Variety, Rob Nelson called it "plenty watchable", but probably more of a draw to cult film fans than to mainstream audiences. In The Hollywood Reporter, David Rooney called the film "a mindless exploitation entry that should have been appallingly awesome" but which "instead marshals too little style or intentional humor".
