= The Messengers (film) =

- Theatrical release poster
- Directed by: Pang Brothers
- Screenplay by: Mark Wheaton
- Story by: Todd Farmer
- Produced by: Sam Raimi; Robert Tapert; William Sherak; Jason Shuman
- Starring: Kristen Stewart; Dylan McDermott; Penelope Ann Miller; John Corbett
- Cinematography: David Geddes
- Edited by: John Axelrad; Armen Minasian
- Music by: Joseph LoDuca
- Production companies: Columbia Pictures; Screen Gems; Mandate Pictures; Ghost House Pictures
- Distributed by: Sony Pictures Releasing (North America); Mandate International (International)
- Release date: February 2, 2007
- Running time: 90 minutes
- Countries: Canada; United States
- Language: English
- Budget: $16 million
- Box office: $55 million

The Messengers is a 2007 supernatural horror film directed by the Pang Brothers, and produced by Sam Raimi. It stars Kristen Stewart, John Corbett, William B. Davis, Dylan McDermott, Carter Kolbeck and Penelope Ann Miller. The film is about an ominous darkness that invades a seemingly serene sunflower farm in North Dakota, and the Solomon family—the owners of the farm—are torn apart by suspicion, mayhem, and murder.

The film was released on February 2, 2007, and the DVD was released on June 5, 2007. Filming took place in the Qu'Appelle Valley near the small community of Abernethy, Saskatchewan, Canada. The film received generally unfavourable reviews from critics. The graphic novel adaptation was published in January 2007 by Dark Horse Comics, written by Jason Hall, and illustrated by Kelley Jones. The prequel, Messengers 2: The Scarecrow, was released in 2009.

== Plot ==
A terrified mother, her teen daughter, and her young son are packing to flee when an unseen attacker kills the whole family.

Five years later, the Solomon family moves from Chicago into the house, located near a small town in North Dakota, where Roy Solomon hopes to start a sunflower farm. There is tension between the parents, Roy and Denise, and their teenage daughter Jess, ever since she got into a car accident six months ago with her toddler brother Ben in the backseat, driving drunk when picking him up from the babysitter. Heavily injured, Ben endured extensive treatment, recovering only to be mute from the trauma. Roy and Denise don't trust Jess and the family is broke from all the medical expenses. Roy believes moving to the farm will help heal them.

Ominous events begin to occur. Murders of crows constantly swarm the home. Some attack Roy but are driven off by a nearby drifter named John Burwell, whom Roy hires as a farmhand. Jess and Ben are haunted by the ghosts of the murdered mother and children, and Jess finds a locket with a picture of the mother inside. When attacked by the ghost of the little boy, she goes to the hospital. The doctors believe the wounds are self-inflicted. Her parents don't believe her about the ghosts, causing a massive argument. Jess runs away and goes into town with her new friend, town local Bobby. Roy goes after her as a huge murder of crows attacks John, rendering him unconscious. Inside the house, Denise sees the ghost of the mother and realizes Jess was telling the truth.

Jess goes to the local store, realizing she has seen the mother from the locket somewhere: on a newspaper clipping in the store. The clipping reveals the father to be none other than John Burwell. His real name is John Rollins, the man who, in a fit of madness, murdered his entire family (as shown at the beginning of the film).

Meanwhile, John awakes and sees Denise rushing to leave the house, which parallels the way his wife had tried to hurriedly leave him. His memories, which he had blocked out, return, and he attacks Denise, thinking she's his wife. Denise hides in the cellar with Ben. When Bobby and Jess arrive, John knocks Bobby out and Jess takes refuge in the cellar. Denise apologizes to Jess for not believing her as John breaks down the door, screaming that he won't let his family leave him.

Roy returns home, only to be stabbed by John with a pitchfork. As mud bubbles from the floor—a sign of the ghosts' presence—Jess struggles with John and kicks him; he falls into the mud, where his dead family rises up and pulls him under. John grabs Jess's leg to take her with him but Roy and Denise save her.

In the end, everything returns to normal. Roy heals from his injuries, the crows no longer attack, the ghosts disappear, and Ben starts talking again. The Solomon family has a good harvest and are happy together.

== Cast ==
- Kristen Stewart as Jessica "Jess" Solomon
- Dylan McDermott as Roy Solomon, Jess' father
- Penelope Ann Miller as Denise Solomon, Jess' mother
- John Corbett as John Burwell/John Rollins
- William B. Davis as Colby Price
- Brent Briscoe as Plume
- Evan and Theodore Turner as Ben Solomon, Jess' younger brother
- Dustin Milligan as Bobby
- Jodelle Ferland as Michael Rollins
- Michael Daingerfield as Police Officer
- Tatiana Maslany as Lindsay Rollins
- Shirley McQueen as Mary Rollins
- Kieria Robinson as Katy Turner

== Production ==
Ravens were used in the movie, not crows, however, the characters say "crows" in the film. The production team could not obtain the trained crows required for certain scenes.

The film began as an original script called The Scarecrow by Todd Farmer. It was originally written as a psychological thriller as opposed to a more supernatural horror film. It was about a family on a farm suffering from financial problems and bad weather seasons. When the patriarch puts up a strange scarecrow out in the field, things start to change. But then people start to get killed, and the main character suspects the scarecrow. By the end, the main character is revealed actually to have caused the killings himself.

The script was sold to Revolution Studios. Director Patrick Lussier signed on to the film and put a supernatural flair into the story. Revolution then brought in Stuart Beattie to rewrite the script. "What I pitched was 'the horror version of A Beautiful Mind,'" said Farmer, "and what they wanted was 'The Shining on a farm.'" Revolution then sold it to Ghost House Pictures, who then took it and hired Mark Wheaton to rewrite it. Impressed with his work on High Tension, producer Sam Raimi offered the film to Alexandre Aja. Aja passed on the film to direct The Hills Have Eyes. None of the original script survived through the rewrites, besides the farm setting, and character names.

The original Scarecrow script was finally used as the basis for the prequel, Messengers 2: The Scarecrow.

== Release ==
=== Home media ===
The film was released on DVD and Blu-ray on June 5, 2007. Extras include an audio commentary and 7 making-of featurettes.

The film was re-issued on Blu-ray on November 6, 2012, by Mill Creek Entertainment. It was included in a double feature with Freedomland (2006), which made its Blu-ray debut in this release.

== Reception ==
=== Box office ===
The Messengers placed first in box office receipts for the weekend of February 2–4, 2007. In its first weekend of release, the film grossed $14.7 million. The film grossed $55 million overall.

=== Critical response ===
On the review aggregator website Rotten Tomatoes, 11% of 83 critics' reviews are positive, with an average rating of 3.8/10. The website's consensus reads, "The Messengers is an atmospheric but derivative rip-off of countless other horror movies." Metacritic, which uses a weighted average, assigned the film a score of 34 out of 100, based on 16 critics, indicating "generally unfavorable reviews". Audiences polled by CinemaScore gave the film an average grade of "C−" on an A+ to F scale.

Film critic Nigel Floyd wrote in Time Out, "many of the images feel over-familiar, and the shocks a mite too forced." IGN Movies wrote in its review, "It's The Grudge on a farm," and concluded, "The problem with The Messengers is that it simply doesn't offer up much of anything new." Scott Tobias of The A.V. Club wrote that the film was "technically proficient enough to deliver the requisite jolts, but déjà vu haunts the film as surely as its pasty-faced, hitch-stepped ghoulies, and it's hard to shake the impression that we've seen this movie before." Writing for the site Reel Views, James Berardinelli wrote that "The Messengers borrows so heavily from (other horror movies) that it has no room left for anything of its own.

== Prequel ==
A prequel titled Messengers 2: The Scarecrow was released on July 21, 2009. The Rollins Family are the film's main characters. It stars Norman Reedus and Australian actress Claire Holt.

== Comic book ==
A comic version of the film was published by Dark Horse Comics in January 2007.
