= Herd (2023 film) =

- Theatrical release poster
- Directed by: Steven Pierce
- Written by: James Allerdyce; Steven Pierce
- Produced by: Bret Carr; Lori Kay; James Allerdyce; Steven Pierce; Matt Mundy
- Starring: Ellen Adair; Mitzi Akaha; Jeremy Holm; Timothy V. Murphy; Corbin Bernsen; Amanda Fuller; Dana Snyder
- Cinematography: Brennan Full
- Edited by: Steven Pierce
- Music by: Alexander Arntzen
- Production company: Framework Productions
- Distributed by: Dark Sky Films (United States); High Fliers Films (United Kingdom)
- Release date: 26 August 2023 (FrightFest)
- Running time: 97 minutes
- Country: United States
- Language: English

Herd is a 2023 American horror film written and directed by Steven Pierce. The film premiered in competition at the 2023 FrightFest, and was distributed internationally through Dark Sky Films. The cast includes Ellen Adair, Mitzi Akaha, Jeremy Holm, Timothy V. Murphy, Corbin Bernsen, Amanda Fuller, and Dana Snyder.

Set amidst a viral outbreak that turns people into zombie-like creatures, Herd tells the story of a fractured lesbian couple seeking refuge in a rural militia compound. Blending zombie horror with queer drama and militia politics, the film explores the fragility of connection in times of crisis and asks whether the real monsters are the ones infected by a virus—or those driven by hatred and fear.

Herd received mostly positive reviews from critics, and currently holds a score of 85% on the review aggregator Rotten Tomatoes. Awards Radar included Adair's portrayal of Jamie Miller among their "Best Horror Performances of 2023."

== Plot ==
Lesbian couple Jamie (Ellen Adair) and Alex (Mitzi Akaha) embark on a canoe trip through rural Missouri in an effort to reconnect after a recent personal tragedy. Their relationship is strained, marked by unresolved grief and tension, which comes to a head when an argument leads to Alex deliberately capsizing their canoe. The incident leaves Alex with a broken leg, forcing the couple to trek through the wilderness in search of help. As they make their way toward civilization, they discover that a viral outbreak has turned much of the population into zombie-like creatures known as “Heps.”

Stranded and vulnerable, Jamie and Alex are rescued by a local militia group led by Big John Gruber (Jeremy Holm), who takes them to a fortified compound that turns out to be Jamie's hometown. There, Jamie must confront her past, including a strained relationship with her estranged, homophobic father (Corbin Bernsen), who is also part of the compound community. Though the militia provides medical care for Alex, the compound itself is fraught with tension, paranoia, and latent bigotry.

As the threat of infection looms, a rival militia group led by the menacing Sterling (Timothy V. Murphy) arrives and demands resources, sparking a violent confrontation between the two factions. Jamie and Alex soon realize that the true danger may not be the infected, but the cruelty and fear-driven decisions of the humans around them. Faced with mounting violence and deepening personal stakes, the couple decides to flee the compound. Relying on their love and resilience, they must survive both the infected and the escalating human conflict around them.

== Cast ==
- Ellen Adair as Jamie Miller
- Mitzi Akaha as Alex Kanai
- Jeremy Holm as Big John Gruber
- Timothy V. Murphy as Sterling
- Corbin Bernsen as Robert Miller
- Amanda Fuller as Diane
- Dana Snyder as Louie
- Brandon James Ellis as Bernie Newson
- Jeremy Lawson as Tater

== Reception ==
The film received mostly positive reviews from critics, and currently holds a score of 85% on the review aggregator Rotten Tomatoes. Many reviewers lauded Adair's portrayal of Jamie Miller as well as Pierce's potential as a filmmaker.

In a Review for The Guardian, film critic Leslie Felperin awarded the film 3/5 stars, writing "Like every zombie-themed movie ever, this low-budget American feature directed by debutant Steven Pierce (co-written by Pierce and James Allerdyce) has a subtext; this one so close to the surface it's barely sub, about schisms that divide communities." Felperin would go on to note "Despite a fairly predictable story, Pierce makes some interesting tweaks to the formula with a final act that confounds expectations."

Drew Tinnin of Dread Central offered similar observations, noting "What Herd manages to do effectively is tap into a running theme in zombie movies where the people you end up with are nothing like you at all. Pierce's film chooses to make the characters more three-dimensional and relatable. In theory, that should make them more interesting. For some, that may prove to be the case."

== Awards ==
Year	Association	Category	Nominee	Result	Ref.
2023	FrightFest	Best Film	Steven Pierce	Nominated	
2023	FrightFest	Best Monster	Steven Pierce	Nominated	
2023	FrightFest	Best Gross Out	Steven Pierce	Nominated	
