= Eileen McNamara =

American journalist

- Born: May 30, 1952 (age 74); Cambridge, Massachusetts, U.S.
- Spouse: Peter May
- Children: 3

Eileen McNamara (born May 30, 1952) is an American journalist. She is the author of Eunice, The Kennedy Who Changed the World, published by Simon & Schuster. She is an emerita professor in the Journalism Program at Brandeis University and formerly a columnist with the Boston Globe, where she won the Pulitzer Prize for Commentary in 1997.

== Life and career ==
A graduate of Barnard College (1974) and the Columbia University Graduate School of Journalism (1976), she was a Nieman Fellow at Harvard for the academic year 1987–88. She began her journalism career at Barnard as a campus correspondent for the Daily News in New York City before graduating to The News-Times of Danbury, CT and the United Press International in Boston. Her nickname is "Mac".

During nearly 30 years at The Boston Globe, she covered everything from the night police beat to the United States Congress. First hired as a newsroom secretary, she worked her way up through the general assignment staff, the State House Bureau, the special projects team and the Sunday magazine staff to the position of columnist in 1995.

In addition to the Pulitzer Prize for Commentary (1997), she has been the recipient of writing and the public service awards from the American Society of Newspaper Editors, Sigma Delta Chi, the Robert F. Kennedy Foundation and others for a reporting career that focused on social issues as infant mortality, domestic violence and juvenile crime. In 2007, she was named a winner of the Yankee Quill Award, the highest individual honor given by the Academy of New England Journalists.

She is married to the sportswriter Peter May, and is the mother of three children.

A regular on local public affairs programs in Boston, she has also appeared on The Today Show, Larry King Live and Nightline. She appeared on The Daily Show on September 25, 2006.

McNamara is the author of two previous books: Breakdown: Sex, Suicide and the Harvard Psychiatrist (which was an Edgar Award finalist in 1994) and The Parting Glass: A Toast to the Traditional Pubs of Ireland (with photographer Eric Roth).

She contributed to the Boston Globe's coverage of the clergy sexual abuse scandal by recommending that the Spotlight Team look further into the cases she had reported on previously. In the 2015 film Spotlight, McNamara was played by actress Maureen Keiller. Spotlight won the Academy Award for Best Picture in 2016.
