= Trick (2019 film) =

Slasher film by Patrick Lussier

- Theatrical film poster
- Directed by: Patrick Lussier
- Written by: Todd Farmer; Patrick Lussier
- Produced by: Ellen Wander; Ita Kennedy
- Starring: Omar Epps; Ellen Adair; Kristina Reyes; Jamie Kennedy; Tom Atkins
- Cinematography: Amanda Treyz
- Edited by: Tommy Aagaard
- Music by: Michael Wandmacher
- Production companies: Durango Pictures; Film Bridge International; RLJE Films; Chimney NY; Premiere Picture; Trix2019
- Distributed by: RLJE Films (United States); The Movie Partnership (United Kingdom)
- Release date: October 18, 2019
- Running time: 101 minutes
- Countries: United States; United Kingdom
- Language: English
- Box office: $48,953

Trick is a 2019 slasher film directed by Patrick Lussier, who co-wrote with Todd Farmer. The film stars Omar Epps, Ellen Adair, Kristina Reyes, Jamie Kennedy, and Tom Atkins. The story follows a detective who is pursuing a killer that only appears in his town during Halloween. It released in the United States on October 18, 2019, to negative reviews.

== Plot ==
In 2015 in Benton, New York, high school senior Patrick "Trick" Weaver is playing spin the bottle at a Halloween party using a knife with "TRICK" and "TREAT" carved into opposite sides of the handle when it lands on another boy. The other players tease Trick, telling him to kiss the other boy. Trick grabs the knife and stabs five teens to death before being stabbed with a fire poker. At the hospital, Det. Mike Denver wishes to remove the Halloween face paint hiding Trick's face but Trick flips the hospital bed and escapes, slaughtering people throughout the hospital using surgical equipment. Det. Mike Denver and Sheriff Lisa Jayne shoot Trick several times and he falls out of a window onto the road below but then disappears into the river. During police interviews, Troy states that he stabbed Trick with the poker but the students provide contradictory descriptions of Trick's appearance. No one has ever met Trick's parents, Trick's registered address turns out to be a dockyard, and the two-faced pumpkin mask that Trick was wearing at the party disappears from evidence.

In 2016, Trick uses the same knife to kill students and teachers at a high school Halloween dance in Riverton, New York. In 2017, more bodies are found at a Halloween party in Hudson Village, New York. On October 30, 2018, Det. Denver warns two agents in Shady Creek, New York that Trick could attack there because they are located along the same river where all of his attacks have occurred. While in a bar, Trick surprises them and kills the two agents.

On October 30, 2019, Trick leaves the message "DENVER" in blood at a murder site in Benton. The next day a masked Trick surprises the now unemployed Denver outside his car and is chased through the cemetery before disappearing. Trick fakes text messages from Denver to lure Deputy Green to the old crane barge, where he injures her with a booby trap then kills her by using a crane to swing a gravestone through the windshield where she is sitting. Sheriff Jayne notes that the gravestone belongs to Agent Christina Mendez, whom Trick killed the previous year. Trick begins killing people in Talbott's haunted maze. Cheryl, a survivor of the original killings in 2015, sees Trick wielding the carved knife. Trick stabs Nicki so Det. Denver sends her to the hospital and Cheryl accompanies her, where Cheryl finds that Trick has killed her hospitalized father. Troy confesses to Det. Denver that Cheryl was the one who stabbed Trick with the fire poker, so Det. Denver and Sheriff Jayne rush to the hospital and find Cheryl held captive by Trick. Trick stabs Det. Denver and Sheriff Jayne multiple times before Cheryl shoots him. When Trick seems unaffected, Det. Denver jumps with Trick out the window onto a car.

Multiple individuals wearing Trick's face paint arrive and Det. Denver realizes that a group of devotees have been carrying out the bidding of the real Patrick Weaver, who arrives in a wheelchair and joins the others in stabbing Det. Denver. Cheryl arrives and notices the scar on the stomach of a nearby man in a wheelchair, whom she pursues back into the hospital. She sees him discard a pumpkin mask into the garbage and begin deleting the hospital's video surveillance footage. Patrick lets her into the room, where they struggle before she uses her self-defense training to use the knife against him and stab him in the stomach. Patrick dies after wheezing out his final words "one of us". Deputy Slater tells Sheriff Jayne that Det. Denver was stabbed to death but Sheriff Jayne notices some face paint remaining on his cheek. Slater attacks her but Cheryl uses the carved knife to stab him. Sheriff Jayne takes the knife from her and stabs him again. The remaining devotees of Trick travel onward to recruit more followers while Cheryl, Sheriff Jayne, and Det. Denver continue to track and pursue them.

== Cast ==
- Omar Epps as Det. Mike Denver
- Ellen Adair as Lisa Jayne, Sheriff of Benton County
- Kristina Reyes as Cheryl Winston
- Jamie Kennedy as Dr. Steven
- Tom Atkins as Talbott
- Alex Breaux as Len
- Vanessa Aspillaga as Agent Tina Mendez
- Thom Niemann as Patrick Weaver
- Todd Farmer as Deputy Wan
- Gary J. Tunnicliffe as Principal
- Aaron Dalla Villa as Smooth Johnny
- Dani Shay as Deputy Green
- Summer Crockett Moore as Patricia Denver
- Hillary Greer as Nurse Helen
- Jérôme Charvet as Deputy Slater
- Melody Hu as Janice
- Sasha Diamond as Deputy Iris Reddick
- Robert G. McKay as Agent Swift
- Adrienne Rose Bengtsson as Brooke
- Allen Wall as Short Scared Ghost
- Kya Brickhouse as Nicki
- Max Miller as Troy
- Raith Kell as Thomas the Orderly
- Kevin A. Wall as Diner Client
- Tony Mitchell as Chief Gunn
- Robert M. Jimenez as Cheryl's Dad
- Ana-Maria Corizo as Cheryl's Mother
- Austin Ferris as Student

== Production ==
Dermot Mulroney was originally cast to play Det. Mike Denver but Omar Epps ended up playing the role in the film.

Filming took place in Middletown, Beacon, and Warwick, New York, as well as the Umbra Sound Stages in Newburgh, New York.

== Release ==
Trick was released in limited theaters in the United States on October 18, 2019. It later released on home media that same year on December 17.

== Reception ==
Trick has a 36% on Rotten Tomatoes based on 28 reviews, with an average rating of 4.2/10. The site's critical consensus reads, "Fast-paced savagery and a memorable twist aren't enough to make up for Trick's slavish devotion to superior slasher films of the past." Frank Scheck of The Hollywood Reporter called Trick "a slasher film with a dull edge" and wrote that "the film goes down an extremely predictable path, mainly buying time between killing sprees". Brian Tallerico of RogerEbert.com gave the film 1½, calling it "more incoherent than terrifying". Meagan Navarro of Bloody Disgusting wrote that "it’s clear that Lussier and Farmer are operating at a sub-standard level" and that "at every level, from technical to story, Trick is a joyless affair."

The film earned $48,953 at the international box office, specifically from the United Arab Emirates.

== See also ==
- List of films set around Halloween
