= The Heist (1989 film) =

1989 American television film

- Genre: Romance; Thriller
- Teleplay by: William Irish Jr. David Fuller; Rick Natkin
- Story by: William Irish Jr.
- Directed by: Stuart Orme
- Starring: Pierce Brosnan; Tom Skerritt; Wendy Hughes; Noble Willingham; Tom Atkins; Robert Prosky
- Theme music composer: Arthur B. Rubinstein
- Country of origin: United States
- Original language: English

Production
- Producers: Robert W. Christiansen (credited as Bob Christiansen); Rick Rosenberg
- Production locations: Del Mar Thoroughbred Club - 2260 Jimmy Durante Boulevard, Del Mar, California; San Diego, California
- Cinematography: George Tirl
- Editor: Jim Oliver (credited as James Oliver)
- Running time: 97 min.
- Production company: HBO Pictures

Original release
- Network: HBO
- Release: September 16, 1989

The Heist is a 1989 HBO made-for-TV movie, starring Pierce Brosnan, Tom Skerritt and Wendy Hughes, with Noble Willingham, Tom Atkins and Robert Prosky.

== Plot summary ==
After serving four years in prison for a crime he didn't commit, Neil Skinner returns to a fictional Ocean Downs Racetrack in San Diego to exact revenge on Ebbet Berens, the partner who set him up to gain control of their racetrack security business, and to win back Sheila Atkins, their third business partner and Skinner's ex-lover, who believes him guilty and is now Berens' lover.

Despite Berens' attempts to get rid of him, and interference from Sheila and police Det. Leland, Skinner uses his intimate knowledge of the track's security systems and personnel to set up an elaborate heist – the goals of which are to land Berens in jail and convince Sheila of his innocence - thereby winning her back.

== Cast ==
- Pierce Brosnan as Neil Skinner
- Tom Skerritt as Ebbet Berens
- Wendy Hughes as Sheila Atkins
- Noble Willingham as Stuckey
- Tom Atkins as Detective Leland
- Robert Prosky as Dancer
- Stephen Apostolina as Ramirez
- Ben Mittleman as Tall Goon
- Nino Surdo as Short Goon
- Shelton Redden as Cave
- Roger Hewlett as Durfee
- Joseph Carberry as Kelso
- Chino 'Fats' Williams as "Fats"
- Art Frankel as Wolscott
