= Yankee Quill Award =

American journalism award

The Yankee Quill Award is a regional American journalism award that recognizes a lifetime contribution toward excellence in journalism in New England. The award is bestowed annually by the Academy of New England Journalists, and administered by the New England Society of Newspaper Editors. It is considered the highest individual honor awarded by fellow journalists in the region.

== Recent recipients ==
2008

- Nelson Benton, editorial page editor, The Salem News
- Ann Smith Franklin (posthumous), American colonialist almanac printer, Newport, Rhode Island
- John Howe, editor and general manager, The Citizen, Laconia, New Hampshire
- Al Larkin, retired executive vice president, The Boston Globe

2007

- Michael Donoghue, sportswriter at The Burlington Free Press in Burlington, Vermont, and executive director of the Vermont Press Association.
- Larry McDermott, publisher of The Republican in Springfield, Massachusetts, and president of the Massachusetts Newspaper Publishers Association
- Eileen McNamara, professor of journalism at Brandeis University
- James Taricani, investigative reporter for WJAR TV in Providence, Rhode Island
- Barbara Walsh (journalist), reporter at The Eagle-Tribune in North Andover, Massachusetts

2006

- David B. Offer, Executive editor, Kennebec Journal, Augusta, Maine, and the Morning Sentinel, Waterville, Maine
- Gary Lapierre, Managing editor, WBZ Radio, Boston
- Chris Powell, Managing editor and VP for news, the Journal Inquirer, Manchester, Connecticut
- Walter Robinson, Assistant managing editor/Spotlight Team, The Boston Globe

1992

- John P. Reilly, Executive editor, The Hour, Norwalk, Connecticut

Here is the list of winners from 1960 through 2009:

1960

- George F. Booth, Worcester Telegram & Gazette
- Sevellon Brown, Providence Journal-Bulletin
- Minnie Ryan Dwight, Holyoke Transcript-Telegram
- James B. Morgan, Boston Globe
- Norris G. Osborn, New Haven Courier-Journal

1961

- Herbert Brucker, Hartford Courant
- Erwin D. Canham, Christian Science Monitor
- Waldo L. Cook, Springfield Republican
- Henry Beetle Hough, Vineyard Gazette
- Arthur G. Staples, Lewiston Journal

1962
David Brickman, Medford Mercury/Malden News

- Guy P. Gannett, Guy P. Gannett Newspapers

James M. Langley, Concord Monitor
William J. Pape, Waterbury Republican and American
David Patten, Providence Journal-Bulletin

1963
Paul S. Deland, Christian Science Monitor
Louis M. Lyons, Nieman Foundation
Henry W. Minott, United Press International

1964
John R. Herbert, Quincy Patriot Ledger
Leslie Moore, Worcester Telegram & Gazette
Laurence L. Winship, Boston Globe

1965
Gordon N. Converse, Christian Science Monitor

- Rudolph F. Elie, Boston Herald-Traveler

Francis R. Murphy, Associated Press

1966
Thomas K. Brinkley, Fall River Herald-News
William Dwight, Holyoke Transcript-Telegram
Edward A. Weeks, Atlantic Monthly

1967
Charles E. Gallagher, Lynn Item
Lawrence K. Miller, Berkshire Eagle
John R. Reitemeyer, Hartford Courant

1968
Arch M. MacDonald, WBZ-TV
Michael J. Ogden, Providence Journal-Bulletin
Forest W. Seymour, Worcester Telegram & Gazette

1969
Harry Bryant Center, Boston University
Alexander J. Haviland, Boston Globe
Edgar M. Mills, Christian Science Monitor

1970
C. Edward Holland, Boston Record-American

- Charles J. Lewin, New Bedford Standard-Times

David M. White, Boston University

1971
Barnard L. Colby, The Day
J. Edward DeCourcy, Newport Argus-Champion
Francis E. Whitmarsh, WBZ-TV

1972
Thomas J. Murphy, Waltham News-Tribune
Thomas Winship, Boston Globe

1973
John N. Cole, Maine Times
Thomas W. Gerber, Concord Monitor
Abraham A. Michaelson, Berkshire Eagle

1974
Robert C. Achorn, Worcester Telegram & Gazette
Bob Eddy, Hartford Courant
Kingsley R. Fall, Berkshire Eagle

1975
Robert J. Leeney, New Haven Register and Journal-Courier
G. Prescott Low, Quincy Patriot Ledger
William L. Plante, Essex County Newspapers
J. Russell Wiggins, Ellsworth American

1976
Joseph L. Doherty, Boston Globe
Loren F. Ghiglione, Southbridge Evening News
Elliot Norton, Boston Herald-American

1977
John Hughes, Christian Science Monitor
Cornelius F. Hurley, Associated Press
John B. Hynes, WCVB-TV
Marjorie Mills, Boston Herald

1978
Dwight E. Sargent, Boston Herald-American
George A. Speers, Northeastern University
Charles L. Whipple, Boston Globe

1979
Everett S. Allen, New Bedford Standard-Times
Judith Brown, New Britain Herald
Ernest W. Chard, Portland Press Herald
Philip Weld, Essex County Newspapers

1980
John C.A. Watkins, Providence Journal-Bulletin
William J. Clew, Hartford Courant

1981

- Alton H. Blackington, Boston Herald/WBZ

Richard C. Garvey, Springfield Daily News
Donald Murray, University of New Hampshire
W. Davis Taylor, Boston Globe

1982
George B. Merry, Christian Science Monitor
Richard C. Steele, Worcester Telegram & Gazette

1983
Stephen A. Collins, Danbury News-Times
Robert H. Estabrook, Lakeville Journal
Brooks W. Hamilton, University of Maine

1984
John C. Quinn, USA Today
Kenneth J. Botty, Worcester Telegram & Gazette
Deane C. Avery, The Day

1985
Leonard J. Cohen, Providence Journal-Bulletin
George Esper, Associated Press
Sidney B. McKeen, Worcester Telegram & Gazette
George W. Wilson, Concord Monitor

1986
Roger Allen, WRKO

- Stanton J. Berens, United Press International

Raymond A. Brighton, Portsmouth Herald
K. Prescott Low, Quincy Patriot Ledger

1987
John S. Driscoll, Boston Globe
James D. Ewing, Keene Sentinel
James Thistle, Boston University

1988
William B. Ketter, Quincy Patriot Ledger
James Ragsdale, New Bedford Standard-Times
Daniel Warner, Lawrence Eagle-Tribune

1989
Irving Kravsow, Hartford Courant
Caryl Rivers, Boston University
James V. Wyman, Providence Journal-Bulletin

1990
Carmen Fields, WGBH-TV
Charles McCorkle Hauser, Providence Journal-Bulletin
Carter H. White, Meriden Record-Journal

1991
No awards presented

1992
Edward S. Bell, Associated Press
Arnold S. Friedman, Springfield Newspapers
Warren F. Gardner, Meriden Record-Journal

1993
Betty J. Brighton, Portsmouth Herald
Bernard Caughey, Quincy Patriot Ledger

- Robert W. Mitchell, Rutland Herald

Hugh Mulligan, Associated Press
John P. Reilly, The Norwalk Hour

1994
Steve Riley, Guy Gannett Publishing Co.
Norman Runnion, Brattleboro Reformer
David Starr, Springfield Newspapers
William O. Taylor, Boston Globe

1995
Leonard I. Levin, Providence Journal-Bulletin
Reid MacCluggage, The Day
Kathie Neff Ragsdale, Lawrence Eagle-Tribune
Bernard S. Redmont, Boston University

1996
Katherine Fanning, Christian Science Monitor
Stan Grossfeld, Boston Globe
Kenneth E. Grube, The Day

1997
Natalie Jacobson, WCVB-TV
C. Michael Pride, Concord Monitor
Matthew Storin, Boston Globe

1998
William Breisky, Cape Cod Times
Michael Short, Associated Press
Rod Doherty, Foster’s Daily Democrat

- Irving Rogers Jr., Lawrence Eagle Tribune

1999

- William J. Pape II, Waterbury Republican-American
- Morley L. Piper, New England Newspaper Association
- John F. Henning, WBZ-TV
- Linda Lotridge Levin, University of Rhode Island

2000
Elizabeth S. Ellis, Journal-Inquirer
Sarah-Ann Shaw, WBZ-TV
David Nyhan, Boston Globe
Robert Foster, Foster’s Daily Democrat

2001
Philip Balboni, New England Cable News
Thomas Kearney, The Keene Sentinel
Morgan McGinley, The Day
Alan Lupo, Boston Globe

2002
Patrick J. Purcell, Boston Herald/Community Newspaper Co.
Joseph W. McQuaid, Union Leader and New Hampshire Sunday News
Clark Booth, WCVB-TV
Ken Hartnett, New Bedford Standard-Times

2003
Paul LaCamera, WCVB-TV
Stephen A. Kurkjian, Boston Globe
James H. Smith, Record-Journal
Harry T. Whitin, Worcester Telegram & Gazette

2004

- Benjamin Edes, Boston Gazette

Elaine N. Hooker, Associated Press
Jonathan F. Kellogg, Republican-American
Joel P. Rawson, Providence Journal
R.D. Sahl, New England Cable News

2005
John Burke, Boston Globe
George Geers, New England Newspaper Association
Thomas Heslin, Providence Journal
Emily Rooney, WGBH-TV
George Stone, The Day

- Isaiah Thomas, Worcester Gazette

2006
Gary Lapierre, WBZ
David Offer, Kennebec Journal
Chris Powell, Manchester Journal Inquirer
Walter Robinson, Boston Globe
William Lloyd Garrison

2007
Michael Donoghue, Burlington Free Press
Larry McDermott, The Republican, Springfield
Eileen McNamara, The Boston Globe
Jim Taricani, WJAR, Providence
Barbara Walsh, Portland Press Herald

2008
Nelson Benton, Salem, Mass., News
John Howe, The Citizen, Laconia, N.H.
Al Larkin, The Boston Globe.

2009
James Campanini, The Sun, Lowell, Mass.
James Foudy, Daily Hampshire Gazette, Northampton, Mass.
Sam Fleming, WBUR radio, Boston
George Krimsky, AP, Center for Foreign Journalists, and the Republican-American newspapers, Waterbury, Conn.

2017 robin young

- Elected posthumously
