= Encounter (2018 film) =

American science fiction film

- Directed by: Paul J. Salamoff
- Written by: Paul J. Salamoff
- Starring: Luke Hemsworth
- Release date: December 9, 2018 (Other Worlds Austin)
- Country: United States
- Language: English

Encounter is an American science fiction film starring Luke Hemsworth, Anna Hutchison, Tom Atkins, Glenn Keogh, Vincent M. Ward, Cheryl Texiera and Christopher Showerman, and is written and directed by Paul J. Salamoff.

== Synopsis ==
A group of friends make a remarkable discovery in a rural field: a crashed spacecraft. Then they discover that there was a survivor. They bring the otherworldly being back to their home, but they soon discover that it holds even greater secrets than they could imagine. But as government agents start to show rising interest in the event, time is running out to ascertain the alien's true intentions.

== Cast ==
- Luke Hemsworth as Will Dawkins
- Anna Hutchison as Jessica Dawkins
- Cheryl Texiera as Teresa Fleming
- Tom Atkins as Professor Westlake
- Christopher Showerman as Jonathan Brandt
- Vincent M. Ward as Marcus Doyle
- Glenn Keogh as Brent Fleming
- Wendy Davis as Agent Tevis
- Peter Holden as Agent Banks
- John H. Greene as Farmer Cobb
- Kenny Barr as Agent Strugatsky
- TJ Jackson as Agent Lem
- Sarah Booth as Rachel
- Susan Willis as Professor Westlake's Wife
- Tweed Michael Manning as Professor Westlake's Father
- Shannon Edwards as Hospital Patient
- Catherine Jerald as Professor Westlake's Mother
- Callie Eckley as Shannon (as Callie Marie Eckley)
- Don Kittilson as SWAT Team Member
- David Sward as SWAT Team Member, Special Agent

== Production ==
In April 2017, filming began in and around Augusta, Georgia. Director Paul J. Salamoff chose to direct in Augusta as he had a prior favorable opinion of the city, stating that it had "not only great tax incentives, but also a great crew base". Landmarks in the film included Paine College. Salamoff also stated that "“The world of ‘Encounter’ is a nod back to classic sci-fi movies of the ’70s and ’80s".

Actor Luke Hemsworth was announced as the film's lead. Other actors that were brought in included Anna Hutchison and Tom Atkins. Glenn Keogh was brought on to replace another actor shortly before filming began, due to issues with the actor's work visa. Coincidentally, Anna Hutchinson played the girlfriend of a character played by Luke Hemsworth's younger brother, Chris Hemsworth, in her second film, The Cabin in the Woods.

== Release ==
Encounter premiered on December 9, 2018 at the Other Worlds Austin film festival. This was followed by a release to VOD on October 1, 2019.

== Reception ==
Encounter received reviews from Flickering Myth and Film Threat, both of which heavily criticized the movie's plot, editing, and special effects. Film critic Jackie K. Cooper was more favorable, writing that "It looks like your run of the mill sci-fi adventure - but it's not. Luke Hemsworth underplays his part and is that much more effective. Plus the movie has just enough of a twist to keep you watching every scene for clues as to what is going on."
