= Elizabeth Yu =

American actress

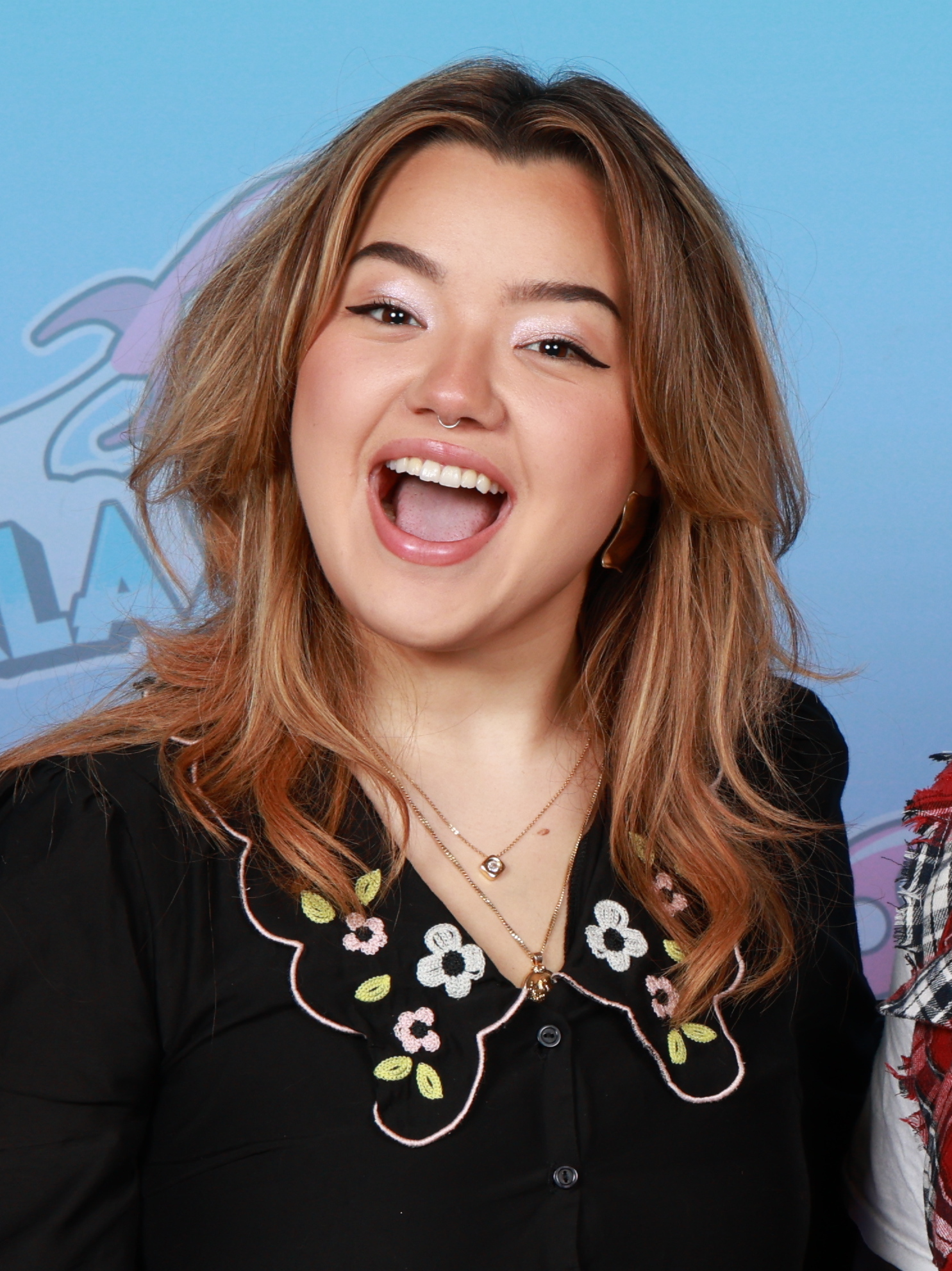
- Yu in 2024
- Born: October 6, 2002 (age 23); New Jersey, U.S.
- Occupation: Actress
- Years active: 2021–present
- Partner: Gaten Matarazzo (2018–present)

Elizabeth Yu (born October 6, 2002) is an American actress. She appears as Azula in Avatar: The Last Airbender, a live-action adaptation of the animated series of the same name.

== Early and personal life ==
Elizabeth Yu was born on October 6, 2002, to a Korean father and a mother of German, Irish and Polish ancestry.

Since 2018, Yu has been in a relationship with Stranger Things star Gaten Matarazzo.

== Career ==
In December 2021, Yu was cast as Azula, the princess of the Fire Nation, in Avatar: The Last Airbender.

Yu's first credit was in the 2022 film Somewhere in Queens. Yu also starred as college student Ruby in Year One, a coming-of-age film directed by Lauren Loesberg.

In January 2023, Yu was cast in May December, a black comedy directed by Todd Haynes. In March 2023, she was cast as Young Maggie in an NBC drama pilot created by Jenna Bans and Bill Krebs. Her character is a "big murder-mystery book nerd" who ends up getting murdered.

== Filmography ==
=== Film ===
Year	Title	Role	Notes
2022	Somewhere in Queens	Amy	
2023	May December	Mary Atherton-Yoo	
2024	Year One	Ruby	
2024	He's Watching You	Shawn	
2024	Womb	Ha-Yoon	

=== Television ===
Year	Title	Role	Notes
2024–present	Avatar: The Last Airbender	Princess Azula	Recurring role (season 1); main role (season 2)
TBA	Murder by the Book	Young Maggie	In post-production
