= Laurence Belcher =

British actor

- Born: Laurence Joseph Belcher; 27 December 1995 (age 30); Surrey, England
- Education: University of Oxford
- Occupation: Actor
- Years active: 2007–2014

Laurence Joseph Belcher (born 27 December 1995) is an English actor, best known for his roles as Young Kazran in Doctor Who and as Young Charles Xavier in X-Men: First Class. He also starred as Maurice Dumont in The Shadow Within and Gracie!. After attending City of London Freemen's School in Ashtead, Surrey, he studied Classical Archaeology and Ancient History at the University of Oxford, completing his degree in 2018.

== Career ==
Belcher made his film debut as Maurice Dumont in horror/thriller The Shadow Within and went on to star in Messengers 2 and X-Men: First Class. He also had a major part in Doctor Who episode "A Christmas Carol", based on A Christmas Carol by Charles Dickens, as the 12-year-old Kazran. Some of his other appearances have been alongside Ashley Judd and Sean Bean in ABC drama 'Missing', released in early 2012. Laurence made his theatre debut in Alan Bennett's The Habit of Art at the National Theatre alongside Richard Griffiths and Alex Jennings in 2010, the end of which was overlapped by rehearsals for Simon Gray's The Late Middle Classes at the Donmar Warehouse, directed by David Leveaux, and starring Helen McCrory and Robert Glenister. In 2013, he appeared in The Turn of the Screw at the Almeida Theatre. In 2022, he appeared in To Kill a Mockingbird at the Gielgud Theatre.

== Filmography ==
Year	Film	Role	Notes
2007	The Shadow Within	Maurice Dumont	
2007	Hell Bent for Leather	Young Seb Hunter	
2008	Little Dorrit	Young Arthur	TV mini-series, Season 1, Episode 1
2009	Gracie!	Young Boy	
2009	Messengers 2: The Scarecrow	Michael Rollins	
2010	National Theatre Live	Young Boy	TV series, Season 1, Episode 4: The Habit of Art
2010	Doctor Who	Young Kazran	TV series, 1 episode: "A Christmas Carol"
2011	X-Men: First Class	Young Charles Xavier	
2012	Missing	Young Maxim	TV series, Season 1, Episode 7: "A Measure of A Man"
2013	Diana	Prince William	
2014	X-Men: Days of Future Past	Young Charles Xavier	Archive Footage
2014	Silent Witness	Robbie Masham	Series 17, episodes 3–4
