= Kathleen A. Foster =

American art historian

- Born: August 28, 1949 (age 77)
- Children: 4, including Ellen Adair
- Awards: National Endowment for the Humanities Grant (x5); National Endowment for the Arts Grant (x7)

Academic background
- Education: Yale University (M.A., M.Phil, Ph.D); Wellesley College (B.A.)
- Thesis: Makers of the American Watercolor Movement, 1860-1890

Academic work
- Discipline: Art History
- Sub-discipline: American Studies, Museum Studies, Material Culture
- Institutions: National Gallery of Art; Philadelphia Museum of Art; University of Pennsylvania; Pennsylvania Academy of the Fine Arts; Indiana University Bloomington
- Notable works: American Watercolor in the Age of Homer and Sargent (2017); Shipwreck! Winslow Homer and “The Life Line” (2012); Captain Watson's travels in America (1997)

Kathleen Adair Foster is an American art historian, critic, and curator. Since 2002 she has served as the Robert L. McNeil, Jr., Senior Curator and Director of the Center for American Art at the Philadelphia Museum of Art. From 1989 - 2002 she served as Senior Research Scholar and Class of 1949 Curator of Western Art at the Eskenazi Museum of Art. From 1979-1989 she worked at the Pennsylvania Academy of the Fine Arts, departing as Chief Curator and Director of Research and Publications.

The author of more than a dozen books, Foster's publications include American Watercolor in the Age of Homer and Sargent (Yale University Press, 2017), Shipwreck! Winslow Homer and “The Life Line” (Yale University Press, 2012), and Thomas Chambers: American Marine and Landscape Painter, 1808-1869 (Yale University Press, 2008), among others. Throughout her career, she has held teaching positions at Williams College, Temple University, Indiana University Bloomington, and the University of Pennsylvania. In 2015 Foster was made an Edmond J. Safra Professor at the National Gallery of Art in Washington, D.C.

== Biography ==
Foster received her B.A. in Art History from Wellesley College and her M.A., M.Phil, and Ph.D. in the History of Art from Yale University. Throughout her graduate studies, she served as a Teaching Fellow and Curatorial Assistant at the Yale University Art Gallery.

From 1975-1976 Foster served as Assistant Professor of Art History and Studio Art at Williams College. From 1976-1979 she served as an Assistant Professor in the Tyler School of Art and Architecture at Temple University. In 1979 Foster joined the Pennsylvania Academy of the Fine Arts as an Assistant Curator, rising the ranks of Associate Curator, Curator, and eventually Chief Curator and Director of Research & Publications. During this period she also served as a Visiting Lecturer in the History of Art Department at the University of Pennsylvania.

Foster would depart P.A.F.A. in 1989 to join the full-time Art History faculty at Indiana University Bloomington, where she jointly served as Class of 1949 Curator of Western Art at the Eskenazi Museum of Art. In 2002 she would accept the position of Robert L. McNeil, Jr., Senior Curator of American Art at Philadelphia Museum of Art, where she concurrently serves as Director of the Center for American Art.

Across multiple institutions, Foster’s work has focused on how American art—specifically from the 19th century—has shaped and reflected the cultural landscape of the nation. Her scholarship has paid particular attention to landscape painting, often emphasizing the work of Thomas Eakins, Winslow Homer, and the Hudson River School.

A prolific author of art history and criticism, Foster's book-length publications include American Watercolor in the Age of Homer and Sargent (2017), Shipwreck! Winslow Homer and "The Life Line (2012), Thomas Chambers: American Marine and Landscape Painter, 1808-1869 (2008), Captain Watson's Travels in America: The Sketchbooks and Diary of Joshua Rowley Watson, 1771-1818 (1997), and Writing About Eakins: The Manuscripts in Charles Bregler's Thomas Eakins Collection (1989). Additional works as co-author include, In a New Light: Alice Schille and the American Water Color Movement (2019), Romancing the West: Alfred Jacob Miller in the Bank of America Collection (2010), and American Art in the Princeton University Art Museum: Volume 1: Drawings and Watercolors (2004).

Throughout her career, Foster has been the recipient of numerous awards and fellowships, including seven bursaries from the National Endowment for the Arts, as well as five bursaries from the National Endowment for the Humanities. In 2001 she was named a Whitney Fellow at the Metropolitan Museum of Art in New York City. In 2002 she was made a Visiting Research Fellow at the Smithsonian American Art Museum in Washington, D.C. In 2005 she was named the Wyeth Foundation Lecturer at National Gallery of Art in Washington, D.C. Ten years later, in 2015 Foster was made an Edmond J. Safra Visiting Professor at the National Gallery of Art.

Foster previously served on the Editorial Board of American Art Review, and has been an editorial reviewer for University of Pennsylvania Press (2003); Princeton University Press (2004); Penn State University Press (2005); American Art (2009), Metropolitan Museum of Art Bulletin (2011); and University of Chicago Press (2014). Additionally she has served as a grant reviewer for the National Endowment for the Humanities (1999) the J. Paul Getty Trust (2000), and the Terra Foundation for American Art (2010-2019).

== Publications ==
=== Books & Catalogs ===
- In a New Light: Alice Schille and the American Water Color Movement (Columbus Museum of Art, 2019)
- American Watercolor in the Age of Homer and Sargent (Yale University Press, 2017)
- Shipwreck! Winslow Homer and "The Life Line" (Yale University Press, 2012)
- An Eakins Masterpiece Restored: Seeing “The Gross Clinic” Anew (Yale University Press, 2012)
- Romancing the West: Alfred Jacob Miller in the Bank of America Collection (University of Washington Press, 2010)
- Thomas Chambers: American Marine and Landscape Painter, 1808-1869 (Yale University Press, 2008)
- A Drawing Manual by Thomas Eakins (Philadelphia Museum of Art & Yale University Press, 2005)
- American Art in the Princeton University Art Museum: Volume 1: Drawings and Watercolors (Princeton University Art Museum & Yale University Press, 2004)
- Thomas Hart Benton and the Indiana Murals (Indiana University Press, 2000)
- American Watercolors at the Pennsylvania Academy of the Fine Arts, (Pennsylvania Academy of the Fine Arts, 2000)
- Thomas Eakins Rediscovered: Charles Bregler's Thomas Eakins Collection at the Pennsylvania Academy of the Fine Arts, (Yale University Press, 1997)
- Captain Watson's Travels in America: The Sketchbooks and Diary of Joshua Rowley Watson, 1771-1818 (University of Pennsylvania Press, 1997)
- An American Picture-Gallery: Recent Giﬅs from Morton C. Bradley, Jr. (Eskenazi Museum of Art, 1992)
- Writing About Eakins: The Manuscripts in Charles Bregler's Thomas Eakins Collection (University of Pennsylvania Press, 1989)
- Daniel Garber (Pennsylvania Academy of the Fine Arts, 1980)
- Edwin Austin Abbey, 1852-1911 (Yale University Art Gallery, 1973)

=== Essays (selected) ===
- “A Research Portal for American Watercolors, Prints, and Drawings 1850–1925: A Source for Obscure Catalogues, Artists’ Societies, and Women Artists,” Panorama: Journal of the Association of Historians of American Art. Vol. 7, no. 1 (Spring 2021).
- “American Watercolor in the Age of Homer and Sargent,” American Art Review, vol. XXIX (Feb. 2017).
- “Women and Watercolor,” The Magazine Antiques, March/April 2017, pp. 84-91.
- “Looking for Thomas Eakins,” Blackwell’s Companion to American Art (London: Wiley-Blackwell, 2015), pp. 146-166.
- “Winslow Homer’s The Life Line, A Narrative of Gender and Modernity,” The Magazine Antiques, Sept. /Oct. 2012, pp. 110-117.
- “New Light on Thomas Chambers,” Antiques and Fine Arts, Autumn / Winter 2008, 166 – 173.
- "Realism or Impressionism: The Landscapes of Thomas Eakins," Studies in the History of Art, Vol. 37, Symposium Papers XXI: American Art around 1900: Lectures in Memory of Daniel Fraad (1990), pp. 68-91.
- "The Still-Life Painting of John La Farge," The American Art Journal Vol. 11, No. 3 (Jul., 1979), pp. 4-37.
- "The Watercolor Scandal of 1882: An American Salon des Refusés," Archives of American Art Journal, vol. 19, no. 2 (1979), pp. 19-52.
- "Edwin Austin Abbey," American Art Review, vol. 1, no. 3 (March–April 1974), pp. 83–95.

== Awards and honors ==
- National Endowment for the Humanities Grant (1994, 1987, 1986, 1982, 1972)
- National Endowment for the Arts Grant (1997, 1986, 1985, 1984, 1983, 1982, 1981)
- Edmond J. Safra Professorship, National Gallery of Art (2015)
- Clarice Smith Distinguished Lectureship, Smithsonian American Art Museum (2015)
- Association of Art Museum Curators "Best Exhibitions of 2012" (2013)
- C. Richard Hilker Art Lectureship, Smithsonian American Art Museum (2011)
- Wyeth Foundation Lectureship, National Gallery of Art (2005)
- Research Fellowship, Smithsonian American Art Museum (2002)
- Whitney Fellowship, Metropolitan Museum of Art (2001)
- National Society of Arts and Letters Inductee (1999)
- Eric Mitchell Prize for the History of Art (1998)
- Indiana Humanities Council Grant (1990, 1997, 1999)
- J. Paul Getty Trust Grant (1995, 1998)
- Dietrich Foundation Grant (1995)
- Henry Luce Foundation Grant (1988)
- Institute of Museum Services Grant (1984)
- Pennsylvania Humanities Council Grant (1982)
- American Art Essay Prize (1979)
- Barra Foundation Grant (1976, 1982, 1995)
