= John J. Wooten =

American dramatist

- Occupations: Playwright, screenwriter, director, producer, professor
- Website: premierestagesatkean.com

John J. Wooten (/ˈwuːtən/) is an American playwright, screenwriter, director, producer, and professor.

Best known as a playwright, Wooten has been nominated for Best New Play by the American Critics Association for The Mission Home (1998). Wooten is the winner of the New Jersey State Council on the Arts Fellowship for Kiss the Bride (1995) and for Fading Grace (2021). The Mission Home (1998), Kiss the Bride (1995) and Happy Hour (2003) were nominated for Best New Play by the Newark Star-Ledger. Wooten's work has been published Dramatist Play Service.

== Career ==
Wooten is the Vice President of Arts Programming at Kean University and the Producing Artistic Director of Premiere Stages. Wooten served as the resident director for the Peter Ustinov screenwriting competition presented by the International Academy of Television Arts and Sciences Before being hired in 2004 to launch Premiere Stages, Wooten served ten seasons as Artistic Director of TheatreFest, where he produced and or/directed over fifty professional Equity productions. Wooten's plays have been produced Off-Broadway and his premieres include The Role of Della, an ATL finalist. In 2023, Wooten received the Star Award from the New Jersey Theatre Alliance for his outstanding contributions to professional theatre <https://www.newjerseystage.com/articles2/2023/04/25/new-jersey-theatre-alliance-hosted-2023-curtain-call-celebrating-nj-and-the-regions-professional-theatres/>.
