= Todd Farmer =

American screenwriter and actor

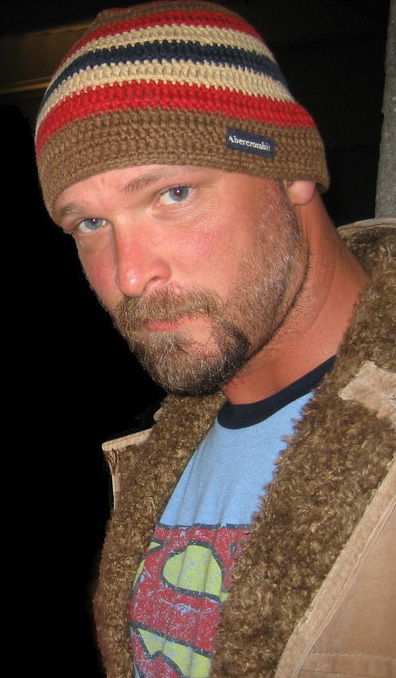
- Todd Farmer
- Born: November 21, 1968 (age 56); Fort Madison, Iowa, United States
- Occupation(s): Actor, writer
- Years active: 1996–present

Todd Farmer (born November 21, 1968) is an American screenwriter and actor known for his work in the horror genre. He wrote or co-wrote the story or screenplay for Jason X (2001), The Messengers (2007), My Bloody Valentine 3D (2009), and the action film Drive Angry (2011).

== Early life ==
Farmer was born to Dennis and Bonnie Farmer in Fort Madison, Iowa. At a young age he moved to Benton, Kentucky, where he attended Benton Elementary School and Marshall County High School. He attended Freed–Hardeman University to study marketing/advertising. He dropped out before his senior year, and then pursued a career as an independent Amway distributor. In the mid-1990s he moved from Texas to Los Angeles, where Farmer started his career working for Sean S. Cunningham.

== Career ==
Farmer's first film Jason X was the 10th entry in the Friday the 13th franchise,. He wrote the screenplay and chose a futuristic setting in order to not collide with the continuity of Freddy vs. Jason, another film in the series, being still in development at the time.

Farmer also wrote the screenplay for The Messengers, but not much of it found its way into the finished film which went through several re-writes after the original production company had sold the rights to Ghost House / Mandate Pictures by means of a turnaround deal. 2 years later though, Messengers 2: The Scarecrow, a straight-to-DVD production and a prequel to the first film, actually used Farmer's original script and adapted it with only minor changes in the third act.

Together with director Patrick Lussier, Farmer wrote the screenplay for 4 films so far, with the 3D remake of the 1981 Canadian slasher horror film My Bloody Valentine being their first collaboration. Most recently, they made the supernatural revenge thriller Drive Angry starring Nicolas Cage, Amber Heard and William Fichtner.

Apart from writing, Farmer also played smaller parts in all of his films except for the two The Messengers installments.

== Filmography ==
Year	Film	Role	Writing Credits
2001	Jason X	Dallas	Writer
2007	The Messengers		Story
2009	My Bloody Valentine	Frank	Writer
2009	Messengers 2: The Scarecrow		Writer
2009	His Name Was Jason: 30 Years of Friday the 13th	Himself	Starring
2011	Drive Angry	Frank Raimi	Writer
2013	Crystal Lake Memories: The Complete History of Friday the 13th	Himself	Starring
2014	American Muscle	Sam	Actor
2019	Trick	Deputy Wan	Writer
