= Nikkole Salter =

American dramatist

- Born: Los Angeles, California, U.S.
- Education: Howard University (BFA); New York University (MFA)
- Website: www.nikkolesalter.com

Nikkole Salter is an American actress, playwright, and advocate known for her work on the Obie Award-winning and Pulitzer Prize nominated play In the Continuum. Salter co-wrote and co-starred in In the Continuum with Danai Gurira. The success of In the Continuum prompted Salter to co-launch The Continuum Project with Glenn Gordon NSangou. The Continuum Project is a non-profit organization that "provides innovative cultural programming for the unification, enrichment and empowerment of the global African Diaspora." As a playwright, Salter has written seven full-length plays. Salter's plays have been produced Off-Broadway and in five countries around the world. As an actress, Salter has performed Off-Broadway and at many regional theaters including Arena Stage, Huntington Theater, Berkley Repertory Theater, and the Shakespeare Theater Company.

== Early life and education ==
Salter was born in Los Angeles and started acting around the time she was 8 years old. She discovered her talent for writing while writing a monologue for an acting class. Salter studied theater at Howard University and graduated with a Bachelor of Fine Arts. Salter continued her theater education at New York University's Graduate Acting Program, where she graduated with a Master in Fine Arts.

== Work as a playwright ==
Full Length Plays
Title	Premiere date	Location
In the Continuum	September 11, 2005	Primary Stages
Carnaval	Jan 31, 2013	Luna Stage
Lines in the Dust	October 9, 2014	Luna Stage
Repairing a Nation	February 26, 2015	Crossroads Theatre Company
Freedom Rider	May 1, 2015	Shelter Theatre at the University of Missouri, Kansas City
Indian Head	February 2, 2017	Luna Stage
Torn Asunder	April 13, 2018	St. Louis Black Repertory Theatre
Breakout Session	In Development	n/a
Manchild in the Promised Land	In Development	n/a
Of Great Merit	In Development	n/a
Nolan Williams Project	In Development	n/a
Game Over	In Development	n/a

=== In the Continuum ===
Salter co-wrote In the Continuum with Danai Gurira in February 2004 as part of New York University's FREEPLAY program. Both Salter and Gurira were third year students in NYU's Graduate Acting Program when they created In the Continuum .In the Continuum is a play about the parallel experiences of an African Woman and an African American woman who are diagnosed with HIV/Aids. Gurira and Salter developed In the Continuum because "with black woman being the population with the highest rate of new infections both in the US and Africa- the co-creators of this piece... felt the need to have a story told from the black woman’s perspective; for her to be more than a statistic on a news report." The original production was performed with only two actors and a minimal set consisting of two chairs.

In the Continuum was workshopped at the Mud/Bone Theater Collective and the Ojai Playwright's Festival in 2004. On September 11, 2005, In the Continuum premiered at Primary Stages in New York City. The premiere production was directed by Robert O'Hara and featured Salter and Danai Gurira as the original cast members. In November 2005, the production, including the original cast, was transferred to the Off-Broadway Perry Street Theatre. After a five-month Off- Broadway run, the original cast toured with the production nationally to Woolly Mammoth Theatre Company in Washington D.C; Cincinnati Playhouse in the Park in Cincinnati, Ohio; Center Theatre Group in Los Angeles, California; Yale Repertory in New Haven, Connecticut; Philadelphia Theatre Company in Philadelphia, Pennsylvania; and Goodman Theatre in Chicago, Illinois. The original production also toured internationally to Harare International Festival of the Arts in Harare, Zimbabwe; Baxter Theatre in Cape Town, South Africa; Market Theatre in Johennesburg, South Africa; Traverse Theatre in Edinburgh, Scotland; and the Grahmstown National Arts Festival in Grahamstown, South Africa.

=== Carnaval ===
Carnaval is a play written by Salter that focuses on three men who embark on a sex tourism trip to Brazil Carnaval is performed by three African American male actors and explores the characters' motivations behind their decisions to participate in sex tourism. Salter first got the idea for Carnaval when she read an Essence Magazine article that connected sex tourism in Brazil to African American male tourists. The premiere production was directed by Cheryl Katz and was performed at Luna Stage from January 31, 2013, to March 17, 2013. Less than a year later, the production was remounted in New York City at Dr. Barbara Ann Teer's National Black Theatre. The New York City production was directed by Awoye Timpo and ran from October 21, 2014, to November 16, 2014.

== The Continuum Project ==
After the success of In the Continuum, Salter partnered with Glenn Gordon Nsangou, a playwright with performance and teaching experience, to co-found the Continuum Project. The Continuum Project is a non profit organization that "provides innovative cultural programming for the enchantment and empowerment of the global African Diaspora. "

The Continuum Project launched its first initiative, The Legacy Program: Residency, in 2009. The Residency initiative was brought about through a partnership with African Ancestry and Piper Theatre Production. The Residency initiative gives theater teachers residencies in Public Schools in Brooklyn, New York. In 2010, the Continuum Project launched a second initiative, The Legacy Program: Reflection. The Reflection initiative commissions original plays from teachers who participate in the Residency initiative. The teachers are encouraged to write plays based on their experiences working with the public school children.

== Advocacy ==
In addition to her work with The Continuum Project, Salter is an active advocate within the theater community. She is a member of the Board of Directors for the Theater Communications Group which "exists to strengthen, nurture, and promote the professional not-for-profit American theatre." Salter is also on the Council of The Dramatists Guild of America which "advances the interests of playwrights, composers, lyricists and librettists writing for the living stage."

Salter's advocacy work also includes original theater pieces. Salter wrote Unknown Thousands as part of Every 28 Hours Plays, a "project that consists of over seventy short plays that reflect the current civil rights movement, and tools to help your community address those issues." Similarly, Salter wrote Peace Officer Privilege and Mahagony Corpo for UNTAMED: Hair, Body, Attitude, a collection of "short plays that collectively dig deeper into the national conversation around Black womanhood and social perceptions of Black femininity."

== Acting ==
Theater
Show	Role	Theater	Year
In the Continuum	Nia	Primary Stages and World Tour	2005-2006
Inked Baby	Ky	Playwright's Horizons	2009
Gees Bend	Sadie	Kansas City Repertory Theatre	2008
The Old Settler	Lou Bessie	Luna Stage	2010
Stick Fly	Taylor	Arena Stage/ HuntingtonTheatre Company	2010
Gees Bend	Sadie	Cincinnati Playhouse	2011
Luck of the Irish	Lucy	Huntington Theatre Company	2012
Tough Titty	multiple roles	Paradise Factory	2014
Head of Passes	Cookie	Berkeley Repertory Theatre	2015
Macbeth	Lady Macbeth	Shakespeare Theatre Company	2017
The Christians	Elizabeth	Baltimore Center Stage	2017
Stew	Lillian	Walkerspace	2020

Film/Television/ Media
Title	Role	Year
Moesha	Poet	1996
Whispers	Veiled Woman	2003
The Architect	Annette	2006
The Unit	Female Interviewer	2006
Pride & Glory	Trish Mercer	2008
Rockstar Games' Midnight Club: Los Angeles	voice of Laticia	2008
All That Glitters	Coco	2013
Last Night	Dorah	2014

== Awards and achievements ==
For her work as co-author of In the Continuum, Salter was awarded an Obie Award, the NY Outer Critics Circle's John Gassner Award for Best New American Play, the Seldes-Kanin fellowship from the Theatre Hall of Fame, and the Friends of the United Nations' Global Tolerance Award. When it premiered in 2005, In the Continuum was named one of the best plays of the year by the New York Times, Newsday, and New York Magazine. Additionally, for Salter's performance as Nia, she received nominations for Best Actress by the Helen Hayes Awards and the Black Theatre Alliance Awards.

Salter has also been praised for her other work as a playwright. She was nominated for an AUDELCO Award for Best Playwright for Carnaval. In 2014, Salter was awarded a MAP Fund Grant. Salter was also a finalist for the Eugene O'Neill Theater Center National Playwrights Conference and nominated for both the USA Fellowship and the Playwrights of New York Fellowship.
