= Kate MacCluggage =

American stage actress

Kate MacCluggage is an American stage actress who grew up in Groton, Connecticut.

Her credits include: Boeing Boeing at Barrington Stage Company (2024), Intimate Apparel at McCarter Theatre (2017), Bell, Book and Candle at Longwharf and Hartford Stage (2012), The Merchant of Venice at Theatre for a New Audience (2010), 39 Steps (2010), Twelfth Night at the Chautauqua Institution (2006) and several productions at Ithaca, New York's Kitchean Theatre. In fall 2024, MacCluggage appeared in Left on Tenth, an adaptation of Delia Ephron's novel of the same name.

On screen, MacCluggage has appeared in AMC's Turn: Washington's Spies and Are You There God? It's Me, Margaret.

MacCluggage, daughter of Reid MacCluggage, is a graduate of Wesleyan University and Tisch School of the Arts.
