= Stephen Massicotte =

Canadian playwright, screenwriter and actor

- Born: April 18, 1969 (age 57); Trenton, Ontario, Canada
- Occupations: Playwright, screenwriter, actor

Stephen Massicotte (born April 18, 1969 in Trenton, Ontario) is a Canadian playwright, screenwriter and actor from Calgary, Alberta.

== Personal life ==
Massicotte is an atheist.

== Plays ==
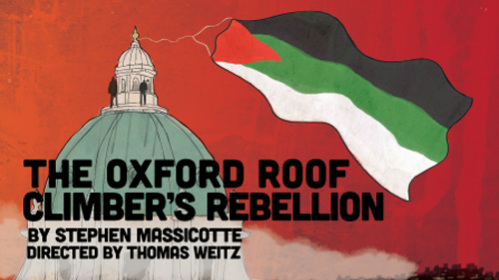
The Oxford Roof Climber's Rebellion

- The Jedi Handbooks trilogy
  - The Boy's Own Jedi Handbook
  - The Girls Strike Back
  - The Return of the Jedi Handbook
- Mary's Wedding
- The Oxford Roof Climber's Rebellion
- The Emperor of Atlantis
- The Last Seduction of Casanova
- Looking After Eden
- Pervert
- A Farewell to Kings
- The Clockmaker

== Screenplays ==
- The Dark
- Ginger Snaps Back: The Beginning

== Opera ==
- Mary's Wedding (libretto)

== See also ==
- List of Canadian playwrights
