= Barbara Walsh (journalist) =

American writer and journalist

- Born: August 13, 1958 (age 68)
- Status: Married
- Education: University of New Hampshire, 1981
- Occupations: Journalist, children's writer
- Notable credit: The Eagle-Tribune
- Spouse: Eric Conrad
- Children: 2 daughters

Barbara Ann Walsh (born August 13, 1958) is an American journalist and writer of children's books. She has worked for The Eagle-Tribune (Lawrence, MA), Portland Press Herald, and South Florida Sun-Sentinel, and has taught journalism at Florida International University, University of Southern Maine, and University of Maine at Augusta. She won a Pulitzer Prize in 1988 for a series she wrote for the Eagle-Tribune about the Massachusetts prison system. Barbara has also worked as an international speaker for the U.S. Department of State.

== Career ==
Walsh worked with Susan Forrest to publish over 175 articles for the Eagle-Tribune on the furlough system of the Massachusetts state prisons under Michael Dukakis, including the Willie Horton case. The system allowed convicted felons to leave prison for short periods. After the series appeared, the Massachusetts legislature passed a statute limiting furlough days. The Eagle-Tribune staff won a Pulitzer Prize for General News Reporting in 1988 citing it is "an investigation that revealed serious flaws in the Massachusetts prison furlough system and led to significant statewide reforms."

Walsh later moved to Florida where she covered courts and social services for seven years in the South Florida Sun-Sentinel of Fort Lauderdale. She and her husband Eric Conrad, another Sun-Sentinel journalist, moved to Portland, Maine, in 1996. There she began investigating major social issues, and in 1997 led a four-person team that produced "The Deadliest Drug: Maine's Addiction to Alcohol", which won the Pew Center for Civic Journalism Batten Award. In 1999 her series "A Stolen Soul", about a woman's struggle to bring her son's murderer to justice, won the national Dart Award for excellence in reporting on victims of violence.

In 2000 and 2001 Walsh spent 15 months interviewing hundreds of Maine teenagers for a series of print and online pieces called "On the Verge". "On the Verge" won the Casey Medal, the top national prize for coverage of children and families. It also received an honorable mention for the Batten Award for excellence in civic journalism; the Pew Center called the stories "a stunningly framed and written series about teens that broke free of stereotypes."

In 2003 Walsh won more awards for "Castaway Children: Maine's Most Vulnerable Kids", which showed the need for more children's mental health services in Maine. The stories led to hearings and legislative changes at both the state and federal levels. The series won the national Anna Quindlen Award for Excellence in Journalism in Behalf of Children and Families. These projects and others—including "Death Too Soon", on youth suicide, and "Crisis in the Courts", on the way faulty record-keeping deters justice—have won state and regional awards and have led to many local initiatives.

In 2007, Barbara won the Yankee Quill Award for her lifetime contribution toward excellence in journalism in New England. Judges commended Walsh for being "a feisty project reporter who writes about important public matters and issues and whose work has changed society for the better." The award is bestowed annually by the Academy of New England Journalists, and administered by the New England Society of Newspaper Editors. It is considered the highest individual honor awarded by fellow journalists in the region.

== Personal ==
Walsh is married to Eric Conrad, formerly a Ft. Lauderdale Sun-Sentinel beat reporter and Portland newspaper managing editor, who was named editor of The News-Times (Danbury, CT) in May 2006. They have two daughters, Emma and Nora, and have settled in Winthrop, Maine.

== Books ==
=== Sammy in the Sky ===
Walsh's first children's book was published by Candlewick Press in August 2011. Sammy in the Sky is a picture book featuring a girl and her hound dog, illustrated by the internationally known contemporary American realist painter Jamie Wyeth. Publishers Weekly called the book "a model of good mourning, it's a fruitful resource; as an account of loss, it goes to the pit of the stomach."

=== August Gale ===
Walsh's second book is non-fiction, August Gale: A Father and Daughter's Journey into the Storm (Globe Pequot Press, October 2011). It features the Newfoundland fishing industry and an infamous storm that killed four members of her extended family, based in Marystown. Kirkus Reviews called it "[a] celebration of traditional family values and reconciliation."
