= Womb (2025 film) =

- Theatrical release poster
- Directed by: Bridget Smith
- Written by: Mike Walsh
- Produced by: Steve Nguyen; Mike Walsh
- Starring: Myles Clohessy; Taylor Hanks; Ellen Adair; Abbey Hafer; Corrie Graham; Brian Anthony Wilson; Elizabeth Yu
- Cinematography: Douglas E. Bischoff
- Edited by: Bridget Smith
- Music by: Holly Amber Church
- Production company: Philly Born Films
- Release date: February 11, 2025 (VOD)
- Running time: 86 minutes
- Country: United States
- Language: English

Womb is a 2025 American horror film directed by Bridget Smith. The film was distributed by Philly Born Films via VOD on February 11, 2025. The cast includes Myles Clohessy, Taylor Hanks, Ellen Adair, Abbey Hafer, Corrie Graham, Brian Anthony Wilson, and Elizabeth Yu.

Womb centers on Hailey (Taylor Hanks), a 22‑year‑old recovering addict who is lovingly pregnant. Along with her fiancé (Myles Clohessy) and sister‑in‑law (Ellen Adair), she retreats to a remote cabin for a peaceful weekend—only to become ensnared by a deranged hunter obsessed with abducting her unborn child. Trapped in the wilderness, Hailey must face her darkest fears as she fights back to protect herself and her baby.

== Plot ==
In a remote clearing, a visibly pregnant teenager is attacked by a camouflaged hunter, who violently abducts her unborn child. A young witness observes the brutality in stunned silence. The story then shifts to Hailey, a 22-year-old woman in recovery from addiction, now pregnant and seeking peace. She travels with her fiancé, Raymond, and his sister, Martha, to a secluded hunting cabin owned by the family. Hailey hopes the weekend retreat will offer a fresh start before the baby arrives. But things at the cabin quickly feel off—windows are boarded, rooms are locked, and Martha's intense interest in Hailey's past (and the fact that her baby isn't biologically Raymond's) begins to feel invasive.

As Hailey settles into the weekend, a sense of dread builds. She sees a figure in the woods dressed in camouflage and hears unexplained noises around the cabin. Slowly, the truth unravels: she's not there to relax—she's been lured. Raymond and Martha are not protectors but conspirators in a twisted plot to abduct her unborn child. The man in the woods isn't a stranger; he's the same hunter from the film's opening, and Hailey is his next target. Betrayed by those she trusted most, Hailey finds herself trapped and isolated as she enters early labor.

The final act of the film turns from psychological tension to full-blown survival horror. Hailey fights to protect herself and her baby as her attackers attempt a brutal, forced extraction. In a sequence of visceral violence, they overpower her and remove the baby. The film closes with grim ambiguity—Hailey's fate is left unresolved.

== Cast ==
- Myles Clohessy as Raymond
- Taylor Hanks as Hailey
- Ellen Adair as Martha
- Abbey Hafer as Patty
- Corrie Graham as Loretta
- Brian Anthony Wilson as Big Country
- Elizabeth Yu as Ha-Yoon

== Reception ==
In a review for FILMHOUNDS Magazine, film critic Mike Evans awarded the film 2/5 stars, writing "Womb is a competently constructed horror tale with some good elements, but it largely feels lacking. The premise is horrific, and the fact that this is a crime on the rise in the real world is alarming, but the film ends up being quite disappointing and feels as if the potential has floundered."

My Bloody Reviews offered warmer observations, awarding the film 5/10 stars, noting "Director Bridget Smith's Womb is initially slow to get going and generic, there is too much in the way of dialogue scenes choking up the film's first half-hour. Once the scenario has been established Womb finds its groove becoming a surprisingly grim and if often nonsensical flick that despite the niggles will no doubt engage and please many that tune into this horror-thriller."
