= Cherokee Scout =

Weekly newspaper in Murphy, North Carolina

The Cherokee Scout
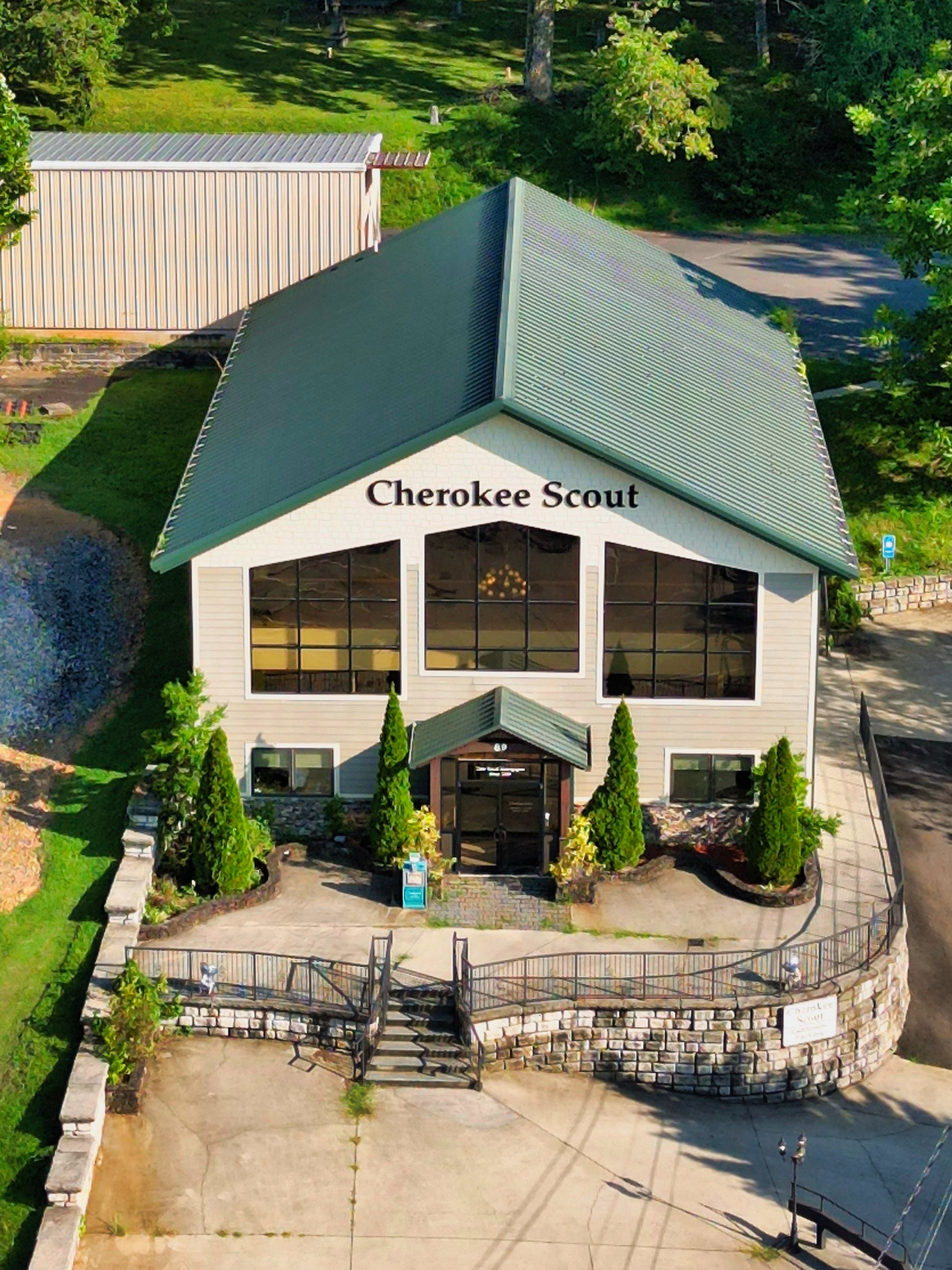
- The Cherokee Scout newspaper's former headquarters
- Type: Weekly newspaper
- Format: Broadsheet
- Owner: Paxton Media Group
- Publisher: Rachel Hoskins
- Editor: Randy Foster
- Founded: 1889
- Headquarters: 893 U.S. 64 West; Murphy, NC, 28906; United States
- Circulation: 5,748 (as of September 2023)
- OCLC number: 10012322
- Website: cherokeescout.com

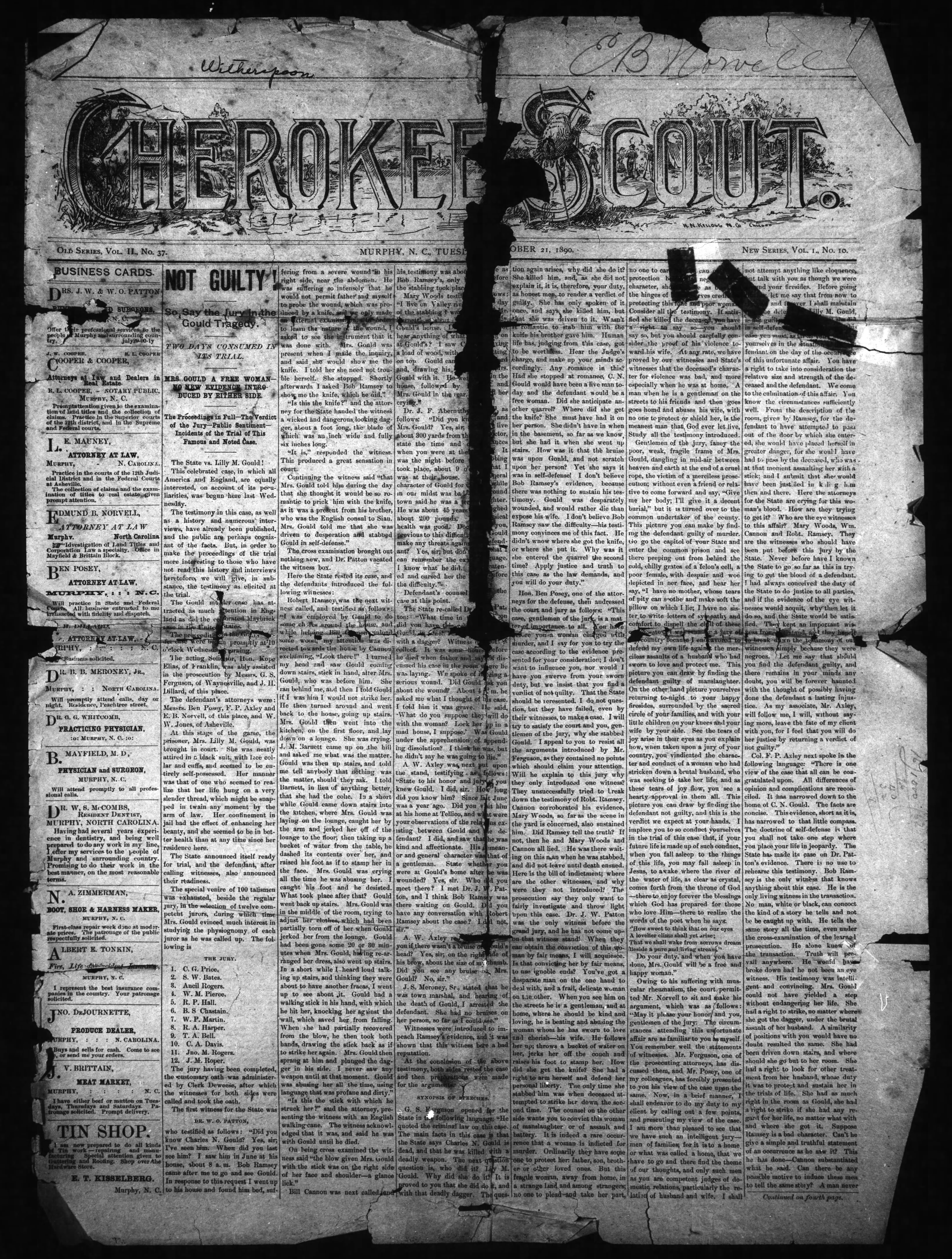
Front page of the Cherokee Scout (Murphy, NC) from October 21, 1890.

The Cherokee Scout is a weekly newspaper in Murphy, North Carolina, and Cherokee County. It is one of the largest newspapers in far-west North Carolina.

The newspaper goes to press and is published online on Tuesdays. Its print edition is mailed on Wednesdays. The Scout had a paid circulation of 5,748 in 2023.

The Scout publishes a number of special sections throughout the year. It has published "Readers Choice Awards" since 2005. The newspaper also prints an annual football guide named "Pigskin Preview," an annual basketball guide, "Mountain Hoops," and other guidebooks on schools, health, and veterans.

== History ==
The Cherokee Scout was preceded by multiple Murphy newspapers: the Cherokee Herald (1874–1876), the Murphy Bulletin (1885–1889), and The Murphy Advance (1889). The Cherokee Scout began weekly publication in July 1889 using a letter press. A 1910 map shows the Scout's office on Peachtree Street near the Cherokee County Courthouse. In January 1946, the Scout offices and printing plant relocated to a newly constructed flag stone building at 20 Hickory Street. Before then the offices and printing plant were separated by two blocks. An offset printing plant was installed in March 1961 on Hickory Street to replace the letter press. It was the first offset press in western North Carolina.

The Scout opened a 5,000-square-foot office it built at 110 S. Church Street on January 16, 1964. In 1965, the Scout became the first newspaper acquired by Community Newspapers, Inc. Three years later in March 1968 the paper installed a new Goss offset press to print the Scout and five other western North Carolina newspapers: The Andrews Journal, Clay County Progress, The Franklin Press, Highlands Highlander, Smoky Mountain Times, and Graham Star. The first color photographs appeared in the Scout by November 1973. The Scout office was robbed in 2001. The Cherokee Scout website, CherokeeScout.com (then TheCherokeeScout.com), launched by 2002. CNI eventually closed the Scout's pressroom and moved printing to Franklin, North Carolina. The Scout built and moved into its current downtown office at 89 Sycamore Street in 2008.

The Scout faced competition from the weekly Cherokee Sentinel newspaper until the Sentinel closed in January 2012 when its publisher fell ill. The Andrews Journal was merged into the Scout on January 1, 2019. The Journal had been published in Andrews since 1965. Since merging, the Scout has been the only newspaper serving Cherokee County. Randy Foster became editor in February 2023. In the early 2020s, the Scout stored the steeple, bell, and other furnishings belonging to the adjacent Harshaw Chapel, believed to be the oldest extant structure in the county, until repairs were made in 2025.

In 2026, Community Newspapers, Inc. sold the Scout and eight other papers to Paxton Media Group. Paxton eliminated longtime publisher David Brown's position, appointed a regional publisher to oversee eight newspapers in his place, moved printing to High Point, North Carolina, and relocated the Scout to a new office outside of downtown Murphy for the first time in the paper's history. In late 2026, a Scout editorial said the paper was not "as good a newspaper as it was before" the sale. The editorial said the Scout went from a dozen employees in a building it owned to a staff of three in a strip mall. The newspaper said the biggest hit was to community coverage and that reduced staffing forced it to scale back on coverage of government meetings.

== Slogans ==
Former slogans include “If it isn’t in the Scout it’s because we didn’t know it” (c. 1920s), “The People’s Paper” (c. 1934), “Our Aim: A Better Murphy, A Finer County” (c. 1939), “Dedicated to promoting Cherokee County” (c. 1956), and “Cherokee County’s Best Buy” (c. 1966).

== Awards ==
As of 2026, the Cherokee Scout has won more than 250 regional, statewide, and company journalism and advertising awards. The newspaper has on multiple occasions won the General Excellence award from the North Carolina Press Association. In 2016 alone the paper won awards from the N.C. Press Association for news photography, sports and religion reporting, plus second place in the "Best Niche Publication" category. In 2019, photographer Ben Katz won Hugh Morton Photographer of the Year in the Community Newspaper Division.

== Publishers ==
1. F.E. Case (1889–1890)
2. Dr. J.W. Patton & J.S. Meroney (1891–1894)
3. J.S. Meroney & Towns (1895–1914)
4. Tate Powell (1915–1922)
5. Bryan W. Sipe (1923–1925)
6. C.W. Bailey (1925–1933)
7. L.A. Lee (1934–1939)
8. Victor C. Olmsted (1940–1942)
9. Addie Mae Cooke (1943–1952)
10. William V. and Emily P. Costello (1953–1955)
11. George N. Bunch (1956–1957)
12. Roy A. Cook (1958)
13. Jerue Babb (1959–1962)
14. Jack T. Owens (c. 1963–c. 1974)
15. Weaver Carringer (c. 1985–2002)
16. David Brown (2003–2026)
17. Rachel Hoskins (2026–present)

== Notable contributors ==
- Jan Davidson, former mailroom worker who became director of the John C. Campbell Folk School
- Tom DeTitta, former reporter who penned Georgia's official state drama, The Reach of Song

== See also ==
- List of newspapers published in North Carolina
