= The Gazette =

The Gazette may refer to:

== Literature ==
- Periodicals named Gazette

== Music ==
- Country Gazette (band), an American bluegrass band
- The Gazette (band), a Japanese rock band

== Other ==
- Gazette (news), an online news publisher in Australia
- Gazette journal (later International Communication Gazette)
- Gazette (TV series), a 1968 British drama

== See also ==
- The News-Gazette (disambiguation)
