= Yarnell Ice Cream Co. =

American food company

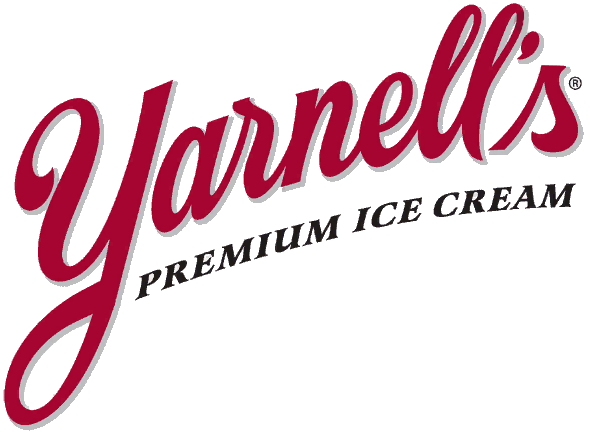
- Company type: Private
- Industry: Food manufacturing
- Founded: 1932; 94 years ago
- Headquarters: Searcy, Arkansas, United States
- Parent: Schulze & Burch Biscuit Co. (since 2011)

Yarnell Ice Cream Company is a privately owned and operated manufacturer of Yarnell's brand ice cream, frozen yogurt and sherbet products. Founded in 1932, the company's corporate headquarters are located along the east side of Spring Park in downtown Searcy, Arkansas, with 11 branch operations throughout three states. It was the only company that produced ice cream in Arkansas. The company commands a large portion of the market share, competing against national and regional brands such as Texas-based Blue Bell Creameries.

== History ==
Klinke Brothers Ice Cream Company in Memphis, Tennessee originally made the "Angel Food" brand products. The Angel Food ice cream differed in texture as it was not slushy which was the norm at the time. In 2006, it had discontinued manufacturing the product, and licensed the brand to Yarnell's. The Memphis Business Journal stated that "The Angel Food brand has been a longtime best seller in Tennessee, Mississippi and southwest Kentucky." Klinke Brothers began focusing more on its Baskin Robbins franchising operations.

Yarnell Ice Cream Co. ceased operations on June 30, 2011. In November of that year, Chicago-based snack manufacturer Schulze & Burch Biscuit Co. bought everything from recipes to its real estate for roughly $1.3 million in a bankruptcy auction. Yarnell's resumed operations under its new management in April 2012. Mitchell Evans is the Vice President of Operations. In June 2020, Pennsylvania-based Turkey Hill entered into an agreement to purchase Yarnell's production facility in Searcy as part of the company's market expansion, while also continuing to produce Yarnell-branded products.

== See also ==
- List of dairy product companies in the United States

== Work cited ==
- "It’s the Downhome Goodness." The Daily Citizen (Searcy). 21 June 2007. Online Edition. accessed 22 June 2007.
- Watkins, Warren. "Very Important Ice Cream." The Daily Citizen (Searcy). 25 June 2007. Online Edition. accessed 26 June 2007.
