= Archdale-Trinity News =

- Type: Weekly newspaper
- Format: Broadsheet
- Owner: Paxton Media Group
- Publisher: Nancy Baker
- Editor: Jackie Seabolt
- Founded: 1978
- Language: English
- Headquarters: 213 Woodbine St. High Point, North Carolina United States
- Sister newspapers: High Point Enterprise; Thomasville Times
- Website: atnonline.net

Archdale-Trinity News is a weekly newspaper based in Archdale, North Carolina covering northwest Randolph County, North Carolina. It is owned by Paxton Media Group along with area papers the High Point Enterprise and the Thomasville Times.

== See also ==
- List of newspapers in North Carolina
