= Thomasville Times =

The Thomasville Times
- Type: Bi-weekly newspaper
- Format: Broadsheet
- Owner: Paxton Media Group
- Publisher: Nancy Baker
- Editor: Jackie Seabolt
- Founded: 1890
- Headquarters: 213 Woodbine St. High Point, NC 27262; United States
- Sister newspapers: High Point Enterprise; Archdale-Trinity News
- Website: tvilletimes.com

For the daily newspaper of Thomasville, GA, see Thomasville Times-Enterprise.

Thomasville Times is a bi-weekly newspaper that primarily covers Thomasville, North Carolina, United States and eastern Davidson County. The newspaper, founded as a weekly in 1890, is owned by Paxton Media Group. As of 2002, the newspaper had a circulation of about 6,300. It currently publishes on Wednesday & Saturday of each week.

== Overview ==
The Times can trace its history back to 1890. However, the more recent version dates back to 1958.

In 1890, J.F. Westmoreland – the brother of D.S. Westmoreland, founder of Thomasville's first chair factory – began publishing a weekly newspaper. The paper later merged with The Chairtown News to become The News-Times. This paper was later absorbed by The Tribune.

In 1958, The Tribune was purchased by The High Point Enterprise and became The Thomasville Times. It became Thomasville's first daily newspaper. The first editor was Wint Capel.
