= The Herald-Sun =

American daily newspaper

Coordinates: 35°58′27.91″N 78°57′32.93″W

- Type: Daily newspaper
- Format: Broadsheet
- Owner: The McClatchy Company
- Editor: Nicole Stockdale
- Founded: 1853: The Durham Morning Herald; 1889: The Durham Sun; 1991: The Herald-Sun
- Language: American English
- Headquarters: 2530 Meridian Parkway, Suite 2A; Durham, North Carolina 27701
- City: Durham
- Country: United States of America
- Circulation: Daily Print: 6,124; Sunday Print: 7,277; Digital Avg. Mo. Unique Visitors: 152,000; Digital Avg. Mo. Page Views: 941,000; (as of 2020)
- ISSN: 1055-4467
- OCLC number: 22992790
- Website: heraldsun.com

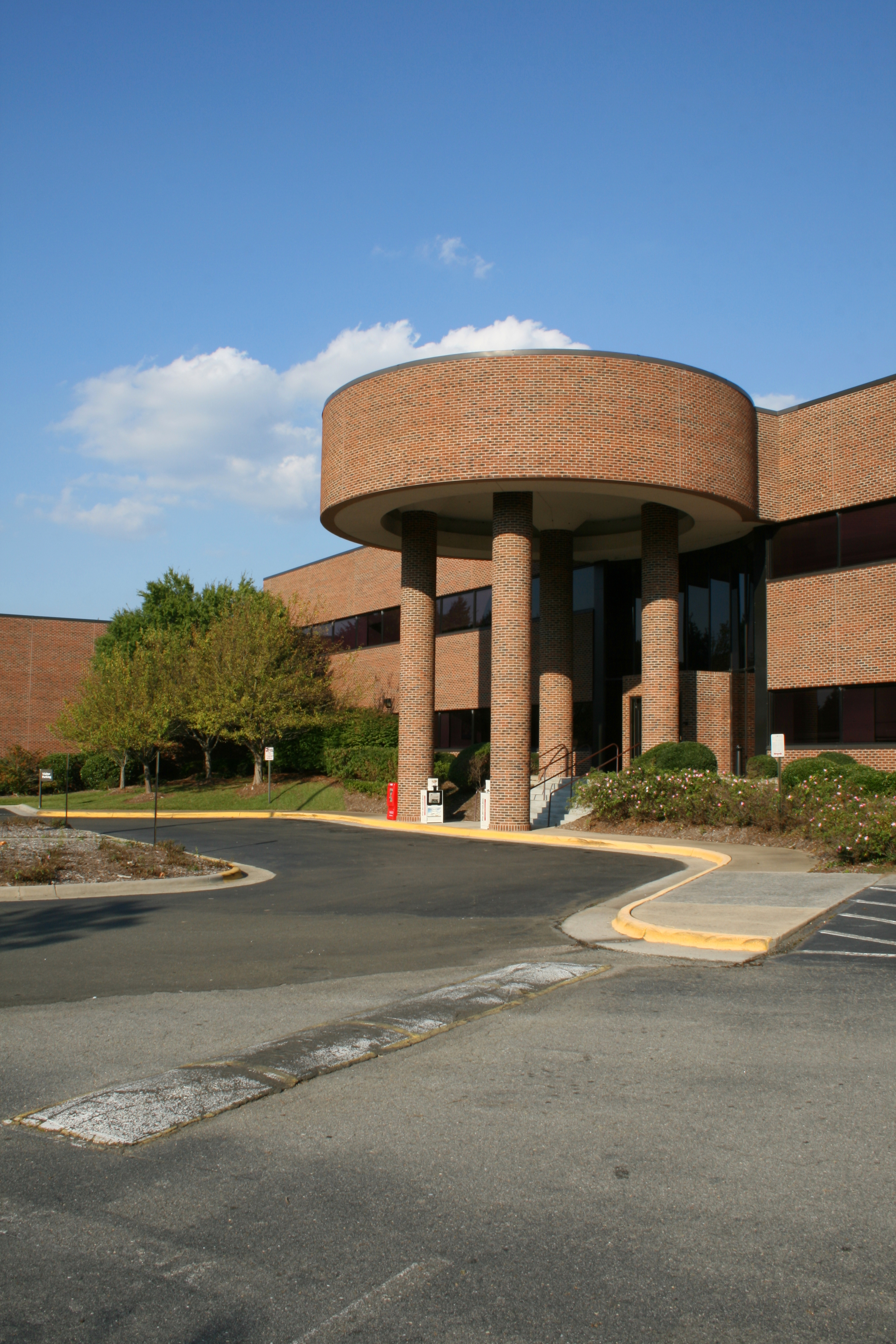
Offices of The Herald-Sun

The Herald-Sun is an American, English language daily newspaper in Durham, North Carolina, published by the McClatchy Company.

== History ==
The Herald-Sun began publication on January 1, 1991, as the result of a merger of The Durham Morning Herald (1919–1990) and The Durham Sun (1913–1990). The Herald-Sun and The Durham Morning Herald had previously been owned by the Rollins family of Durham, which had been in management positions since 1895. Edward Tyler Rollins Jr., former owner, board chairman and publisher of The Herald-Sun, died November 5, 2006, just shy of two years after selling to Paxton Media Group.

=== Early history ===
The Durham Morning Herald began publication in 1893, as a result of the reorganization of The Durham Globe from a daily to a weekly paper. Four former employees of the downsized Globe, itself an outgrowth of the merger of Durham's first daily, The Tobacco Plant and The Durham Daily Recorder, organized a competitor newspaper, The Globe Herald, which would soon be renamed The Morning Herald.

In 1929, the Durham Morning Herald Company acquired The Durham Sun, an evening daily that had been in publication in one form or another since 1889.

=== Merger ===
The late Rick Kaspar was the first person outside of the Rollins family to run the century-old newspaper. He was recruited by the Rollins Family to make changes and bring the company into the 21st century of newspaper publishing. In 1991, he successfully merged the Morning Herald and the Sun to form The Herald Sun. "Rick was devoted to his family, to his community and to his newspaper," noted Durham Herald Co. Chairman E.T. Rollins Jr.

=== Acquisition by Paxton Media Group ===
On December 3, 2004, The Durham Herald Co., the parent company of The Herald Sun and The Chapel Hill Herald announced that Paxton Media Group had purchased the company from the locally based Rollins family. The sum paid by Paxton was not publicly announced (the two companies are both privately held), but sources placed it at about $124 million. Pre-sale appraisals of the company had placed its value at roughly $70 million. The paper has constantly jettisoned employees while seeing its circulation dwindle dramatically ever since the sale.

Upon assumption of operations, on January 3, 2005 Paxton's executives fired 81 of the newspaper's approximately 350 employees, including president and publisher David Hughey and longtime executive editor, vice-president Bill Hawkins, photographer Ross Taylor, editorial cartoonist John Cole and longtime columnist Jim Wise.

The firings were unexpected and abrupt, many employees being told they were fired upon returning from lunch, and then being escorted to the parking lot. The new editor, Bob Ashley said the job cuts were made because of financial reasons. He explained that fired employees were escorted from the building immediately due to security concerns and on the advice of the company's lawyers.

Jim Cooney, the lawyer of one of the three Duke University lacrosse players involved the 2006 Duke lacrosse case named The Herald-Sun in a press conference that was televised live on many national news networks on April 11, 2007. Saying that The Herald-Sun is one of the major "cowards" of the case, Cooney stated that The Herald-Sun empowered Nifong to go forward with a weak case by not "bother[ing] to stand up and demand proper processes [and] the presumption of innocence," while "publishing what they knew were lies, and repeating them." The Herald-Sun also came under fire for having "not written a single editorial critical of the way in which Mike Nifong proceeded" at the time the North Carolina Attorney General declared the defendants "innocent." This occurred despite the fact that the North Carolina State Bar had filed two rounds of ethics charges against him, the North Carolina Conference of District Attorneys demanded that Nifong remove himself from the case, and many other news organizations demanded that the district attorney step down.

On July 30, 2008, Herald-Sun editor Bob Ashley announced a new round of staff layoffs and content reductions, citing the paper's poor revenues and admitting that the quality and quantity of the information presented in The Herald-Sun was not satisfying readers. Ashley also noted that a number of stand-alone feature sections would be consolidated into a nonetheless reduced metro section and that overall article length would be reduced, while the number of informational graphics and informational sidebars would increase, a move that appears to signal a further reduction in the depth of local and national reporting. According to Ashley, the shorter article length, along with the recent reassignment of two staffers to news reporting will increase local coverage, much like similarly promised increases in local reporting that followed on the heels of Paxton's earlier staff cuts at The Herald-Sun.

On May 15, 2009, there was yet another reduction that included seven members of the newsroom staff among others.

On July 28, 2011, seven staff positions were eliminated from The Herald-Sun's newsroom, leaving a fewer than 20 editorial staff positions at the Durham paper. In the course announcing the layoffs, Publisher Rick Bean also announced that, as of August 14, 2011, production duties, namely page design and copy editing, would be shifted from Durham-based staff to the staff of the Owensboro Messenger-Inquirer, in Kentucky.

On September 25, 2013, there was yet another staff reduction, with six staffers sent packing including two in the newsroom. Among the casualties was sports editor Jimmy DuPree, who had been with the paper for more than 25 years.

== Acquisition by The McClatchy Company ==
In late December 2016, Paxton sold The Herald-Sun to The McClatchy Company. The acquisition made The Herald-Sun a sister paper to the other major daily newspaper in the Triangle, The News & Observer of Raleigh.

== Web site ==
The Herald-Sun's website was first launched in 1995 as a basic online information site, with relatively little dynamic content from the print edition of the newspaper. Despite the basic offerings, the site won a Newspaper Association of America Digital Edge Award for its online guide to local and national candidates during the 1996 elections.

On November 7, 2000, heraldsun.com was relaunched as a dynamic news site with content drawn directly from the print edition, wire services, as well as updates and features on local news stories during the course of the day. As of June 2003, the site was receiving more than 3 million page views per month and had been honored more than seven times for its design and innovation.

=== Changes under Paxton Media Group ===
Following the newspaper's purchase by the Paxton Media Group in 2005, the website was dramatically pared back, as a majority of the IT staff and many of the newspaper's local content providers were dismissed in the mass firings of January 3, 2005. Apart from an automated feed of AP wire stories, the site was no longer updated during the day, even during the course of major local and national events.

A redesign of the site, in early 2007, made an effort to de-emphasize the AP-wire feed headlines, which were no longer placed at the top of the page. The redesign also introduced compulsory, free, registration for users wishing to read any article, including the AP-wire feed stories.

In 2009, the Web site technology was outsourced to Matchbin Inc., and later to Radiate Media, but it is still managed by staff at The Herald-Sun.

On May 12, 2013, publisher Rick Bean announced the company's plans to sell its 23-year-old, 100,000-square-foot building on Pickett Road.

== Circulation ==
The Herald-Sun's geographic emphasis is on the western counties of the Research Triangle area of North Carolina that surround the City of Durham and the Town of Chapel Hill, including Durham County, Orange County, Person County, Granville County and Chatham County. In the early to mid 90s, the paper also was circulated in Wake County and had a Cary-based edition and offices.

Since Paxton Media Group's assumption of The Herald Sun's operations, on January 4, 2005, circulation has steadily and rapidly declined. Between January 1 and March 31, 2008, the paper was estimated to reach less than 20 percent of households in Durham and Orange counties, its primary subscriber base. Furthermore, having lost 10.8 percent of its weekday subscribers between March 2007 and March 2008, The Herald-Sun suffered the largest circulation loss of any daily newspaper in North Carolina, and was only one of two that lost more than 6 percent, the other being High Point's Paxton-owned Enterprise. By comparison, The Herald Sun's primary market competitor, the Raleigh News and Observer lost less than one percent of its daily subscribers in the same period.

| | Weekday | Saturday | Sunday |
|---|---|---|---|
| 2003 | 50,612 | | 56,363 |
| 2004 | | | |
| 2005 | 42,298 | 39,835 | 45,793 |
| 2006 | | | |
| 2007 | 36,050 | 30,637 | 36,513 |
| 2008 | 29,449 | 24,965 | 30,192 |
| 2009 | 25,111 | 25,111 | 28,038 |
| 2010 | 25,080 | 25,080 | 28,246 |
| 2011 | 24,000 | | |
| 2012 | 21,367 | | 22,268 |

== Notable employees ==
For the Durham Sun

- Lloyd Shearer (later a gossip columnist)
- Mena Webb, columnist and society editor

== See also ==
- List of newspapers in North Carolina
