= Charles Findley =

Charles Findley may refer to:

- Charles P. Findley (fl. 1853), American politician in Alabama
- Chuck Findley (born 1947), American trumpet player and session musician

== See also ==
- Charles Finley (disambiguation)
