= La Gaceta =

La Gaceta may refer to

- La Gaceta (Honduras), the official journal of the Republic of Honduras.
- La Gaceta (Tampa), a trilingual newspaper in Tampa, Florida, United States
- La Gaceta (Tucumán), a newspaper in San Miguel de Tucumán, Argentina
- La Gaceta (Spain), a Spanish newspaper
- La Gaceta Mexicana, a Mexican-American newspaper published in Houston, Texas, United States

== See also ==
- The Gazette (disambiguation)
