= Local 6 =

Local 6 can refer to the moniker used by the following stations:

- WKMG-TV channel 6, a CBS affiliate in Orlando, Florida (used from 2001 to 2015)
- WPSD-TV channel 6, an NBC affiliate in Paducah, Kentucky
