= Charles Finley =

Charles Finley may refer to:

- Charles Finley (politician) (1865–1941), U.S. representative from Kentucky
- Charlie Finley (1918–1996), American businessman, best known as owner of the Oakland Athletics
- Chuck Finley (born 1962), American professional baseball pitcher, primarily for the then-California Angels
- Charles Finley (coach) (1907–1972), American college basketball coach, primarily at the University of Idaho
- Charles M. Finley (1899–1958), American businessman and politician from Philadelphia
- Charles A. Finley (1849–1934), American secretary of the Florida Senate and state representative
- Sam Axe, fictional character on the television series Burn Notice, whose most commonly used alias is "Charles Finley" or "Chuck Finley"

== See also ==
- Charles Coleman Finlay (born 1964), American science fiction and fantasy author
- Charles Findley (disambiguation)
