= News Democrat =

News Democrat or News-Democrat may refer to:

- The News-Democrat, a weekly newspaper in Georgetown, Ohio
- The News-Democrat, a daily newspaper published in Paducah, Kentucky from 1901 to 1929
- News-Democrat & Leader, a bi-weekly (2/week) newspaper published in Russellville, Kentucky starting in the 1990s
- Belleville News-Democrat, a daily newspaper in Belleville, Illinois
