= Daily Corinthian =

Newspaper in Mississippi, USA

- Type: Daily newspaper
- Owner(s): Paxton Media Group
- Publisher: Reece B. Terry
- Editor: Brant Sappington
- Headquarters: 1607 South Harper Rd Corinth, MS 38834
- ISSN: 2640-0421 (print); 2640-043X (web)
- OCLC number: 849807696
- Website: dailycorinthian.com

The Daily Corinthian is a daily newspaper published in Corinth, Mississippi, United States, serving Corinth and the immediate region, with a reported circulation of 6,711 Tuesday-Saturday, 6,554 Sundays. The Daily Corinthian is one of two daily newspapers published in northeast Mississippi. The other is The Tupelo Daily Journal, located about 50 miles south of Corinth. They both compete for market share with The Clarion-Ledger out of Jackson, Mississippi, which considers itself a statewide paper, as well as with the West Tennessee daily papers (the Commercial Appeal and the Jackson Sun). The Daily Corinthian was founded in 1899.

The Daily Corinthian was formerly owned by Worrell Newspapers of Charlottesville, Virginia. The New York Times Company acquired 8 daily papers, including the Corinthian, from Worrell in 1982. It is currently owned by the Paxton Media Group, which bought it from The New York Times in 1995.
