= La Porte County Herald-Dispatch =

The News-Dispatch
- Type: Daily newspaper
- Owner(s): Paxton Media Group
- Headquarters: Michigan City, Indiana, United States
- Website: lpheralddispatch.com

The La Porte County Herald-Dispatch is a daily newspaper of Michigan City, Indiana, US. It is LaPorte County's only daily newspaper.

== History ==
The News-Dispatch of Michigan City was established in 1938 through the merger of the Michigan City News and the Michigan City Evening Dispatch.

In September 2007, Small Newspaper Group sold the La Porte Herald-Argus to Paxton Media Group.

On August 4, 2020, the News-Dispatch and the Herald-Argus were merged to form the La Porte County News-Dispatch.
