= The Herald-Palladium =

Newspaper published in Saint Joseph, Michigan

- Type: Daily newspaper
- Format: Broadsheet
- Owner: Paxton Media Group Inc.
- Publisher: David Holgate
- Editor: Dave Brown
- Headquarters: 3450 Hollywood Road; P.O. Box 128; St. Joseph, Michigan 49085; United States
- Circulation: 100 (as of 2022)
- Website: heraldpalladium.com

The Herald-Palladium is a newspaper distributed in the Southwest Michigan region serving all or part of Berrien, Cass, Van Buren, and Allegan Counties.

== History ==
The Herald-Palladium is a merger of many former local newspapers in the twin cities of Benton Harbor and St. Joseph, Michigan.

=== Palladium predecessors ===
==== Herald-Press ====
The Herald-Press formed in 1916 in St. Joseph from the merger of two other newspapers:

- The Evening Herald was the second venture of Palladium's founder, Leonard Merchant. In 1877 he moved to St. Joseph and bought an existing newspaper, The Traveler and Herald. He changed its name to The St. Joseph Weekly Herald. Merchant brought his son, Leonard E. Merchant into the business. They sold it to Ephriam W. Moore around 1900, who turned it into a daily afternoon paper.
- The St. Joseph Press was founded as a weekly newspaper in 1888. In 1905, Ephriam Moore's nephew, Joseph Brewer, bought it and turned it into a daily newspaper.

In 1916, uncle and nephew merged their operations.

==== News-Palladium ====
The News-Palladium was formed in 1904 from the merger of two newspapers:

- The Benton Harbor Palladium was founded in 1868 and named after a newspaper in New Haven, Connecticut where its founder and his wife had previously worked. This newspaper is the earliest predecessor of the Herald-Palladium. Leonard G. Merchant founded the weekly newspaper, but sold it in 1869 to J.P. Thresher. Over the next 16 years it was sold several more times, finally to Frank Gibson. In 1886, he converted it to a daily, called The Daily Palladium.
- The Evening News, founded 1895 by John Nellis Klock, J. Stanley Morton and Humphrey S. Gray.

The News outperformed the Palladium, prompting Frank Gibson to sell his paper to the competing concern in 1904. Klock and company in turn sold it to Moore in 1910.

==== Herald-Palladium ====
With the 1910 and 1916 sales and mergers, all four predecessor newspapers were under Moore's control, but operated as two separate newspapers, one in each city. In 1919, Klock and two new associates incorporated Palladium Publishing Co., as a vehicle to purchase Klock's Benton Harbor paper back from Moore upon his retirement. They then purchased the St. Joseph newspaper in 1928, once again consolidating ownership, but not operating companies or reporting.

By 1965, operations had started to merge, with a shared publishing plant and advertising. The content also became common. The corporate structures were fully merged in 1970, and, the final change to a single masthead, The Herald-Palladium, occurred February 3, 1975.

Palladium sold out to Thomson in 1985. Thomson divested the paper to Conrad Black's Hollinger in 1996, which sold it on to Paxton Media Group in 2000.
