= WPSD-TV =

Television station in Paducah, Kentucky

- Paducah, Kentucky; Marion–Harrisburg, Illinois; Cape Girardeau, Missouri; United States
- City: Paducah, Kentucky
- Channels: Digital: 19 (UHF); Virtual: 6
- Branding: WPSD Local 6

Programming
- Affiliations: 6.1: NBC; 6.2: Cozi TV; 6.3: Antenna TV

Ownership
- Owner: Paxton Media Group; (WPSD-TV, LLC)

History
- First air date: May 28, 1957
- Former channel numbers: Analog: 6 (VHF, 1957–2009); Digital: 32 (UHF, 2001–2020)
- Former affiliations: All secondary: ABC (1957–1960s)
- Call sign meaning: Paducah Sun-Democrat

Technical information
- Licensing authority: FCC
- Facility ID: 51991
- ERP: 679 kW
- HAAT: 492 m (1,614 ft)
- Transmitter coordinates: 37°11′31.2″N 88°58′53.2″W

Links
- Public license information: Public file; LMS
- Website: www.wpsdlocal6.com

WPSD-TV (channel 6) is a television station licensed to Paducah, Kentucky, United States, serving as the NBC affiliate for Western Kentucky's Jackson Purchase region, Southern Illinois, the Missouri Bootheel, and northwest Tennessee. Owned by locally based Paxton Media Group as its sole television property, the station maintains studios on 4th Street and Kentucky Avenue in downtown Paducah, and its transmitter is located at Monkey's Eyebrow, Kentucky.

== History ==
The station signed on as WPSD on May 28, 1957, with a signal on VHF channel 6. It has been an NBC affiliate and owned by the Paxton family for its entire existence alongside Western Kentucky's major newspaper, The Paducah Sun. The "PSD" letters in the call sign stands for Paducah Sun-Democrat which was the paper's name at the time the station launched in 1957.

On June 7, 2025, WPSD moved from its original facility at 100 Television Lane to 408 Kentucky Avenue where The Paducah Sun is also located.

== Programming ==
WPSD initially declined to carry Saturday Night Live. The station made a compromise after receiving negative feedback for the preemption; for several years, they delayed the variety show for an hour. In the early 1990s, the station finally decided to air the program at its network-recommended time of 10:30 p.m. CT.

=== News operation ===
WPSD serves more than fifty counties in southeastern Missouri, southern Illinois, western Kentucky, and northwest Tennessee. Among the area's big three outlets, the station focuses more on Western Kentucky since it is based in Paducah. In addition to its main studios, WPSD operates a bureau on South Illinois Avenue in Downtown Carbondale.

Beginning in 2006, WPSD produced a nightly prime time newscast on Fox affiliate KBSI through a news share agreement, known as Local 6 at 9 on Fox 23 and featured a regional summary of headlines because KBSI is based in Cape Girardeau, Missouri. For nearly eight years, the broadcast competed with KFVS's own nightly prime time news at 9 p.m. seen on the area's low-powered CW affiliates WQTV-LP/WQWQ-LP, which was canceled on July 29, 2007. WPSD's partnership with KBSI expired on September 30, 2010. KBSI entered into a new partnership with KFVS presumably to refocus the prime time production to the Missouri Bootheel area and expand it to 60 minutes. On October 3, 2010, WPSD brought back its own newscast at 9 p.m. to its RTV and Antenna TV subchannels. Known as The Nine and seen every night for a half-hour, it was simulcast on those two services. WPSD's newscast at 9 p.m. was canceled in 2019.

==== Notable former on-air staff ====
- Lew Jetton
- Sam Champion

== Technical information ==
=== Subchannels ===
The station's signal is multiplexed:

Subchannels of WPSD-TV
Subchannel	Res.	Short name	Programming
6.1	1080i	WPSD-HD	NBC
6.2	480i	COZI	Cozi TV
6.3	480i	CLASSIC	Antenna TV (4:3)

=== Analog-to-digital conversion ===
WPSD-TV shut down its analog signal, over VHF channel 6, on June 12, 2009, the official date on which full-power television stations in the United States transitioned from analog to digital broadcasts under federal mandate. The station's digital signal remained on its pre-transition UHF channel 32, using virtual channel 6.

=== Former translator ===
WPSD formerly operated a low-power VHF analog repeater W10AH (channel 10) in Carbondale, Illinois, from a transmitter (sharing the WSIU-FM tower) on the Southern Illinois University campus. The license was last renewed in 2005 and canceled effective September 23, 2013.
