= The Daily Courier (North Carolina) =

Coordinates: 35.333565°N 81.884533°W

- Type: Daily newspaper
- Owner: Paxton Media Group
- Publisher: Lori Spurling
- Editor: Jean Gordon
- Founded: January 1, 1969
- Language: English
- Headquarters: 601 Oak Street; Forest City, NC 28043
- City: Forest City, North Carolina
- Country: United States of America
- Circulation: 6,800
- OCLC number: 14472923
- Website: thedigitalcourier.com

The Daily Courier is an American, English language newspaper published in Forest City, North Carolina, owned by the Paxton Media Group.

The Daily Courier publishes both print and online editions Tuesday through Friday and Sunday, featuring local news, sports, entertainment and opinions. It started in 1969 as This Week, a weekly publication, and switched to daily publication in 1978. The Daily Courier has a circulation base of more than 6,800

== See also ==
- List of newspapers in North Carolina
