= Community Newspapers Inc. =

American publisher

Community Newspapers, Inc.
- Industry: Newspaper publishing
- Founded: 1967; 59 years ago
- Founder: N.J. Babb
- Headquarters: Athens, Georgia, USA
- Key people: Tom Wood (Owner); Dink NeSmith (Owner); Mark Major (President); Alan NeSmith (Chairman)
- Revenue: $ 55,043,466 (2023)
- Number of employees: 510 (2023)
- Website: cninewspapers.com

Community Newspapers, Inc. is an American publisher of newspapers and advertising-related publications throughout the southeastern United States. The company was formed in 1967 by Newton Jerue Babb, and is based in Athens, Georgia. It owns and operates about 25 newspapers. As of 2023, approximately ten employees work at the company's headquarters in Athens. Another 500 work at other locations.

== History ==
Babb founded the company in Spartanburg, South Carolina, and helped it grow to control nearly 50 newspapers. The first newspaper in its portfolio was the Cherokee Scout. On January 1, 1985, Babb and his wife (who served as president of CNI) were found dead in an apparent murder-suicide in a Holiday Inn hotel room in Tuxedo, North Carolina. In March 1989 William J. Bresnan, Jeff DeMond, Thomas H. Wood and W.H. 'Dink' NeSmith purchased the company.

In 1999, CNI sold the Lake City News & Post and The Weekly Observer of Hemingway to Thompson Newspapers Inc. In 2006, Bresnan and DeMond were bought out and today the company is owned by Wood and NeSmith. NeSmith is a past chairman of the Georgia Telecommunications Commission and former president of the Georgia Press Association. In 2021, chief financial officer Mark Major replaced NeSmith as president and NeSmith took Wood's place as chairman of the board.

In April 1977, CNI sold the Tribune-Times in Mauldin to Tri-City Media. In March 1999, CNI agreed to acquired The Hartwell Sun, The News-Leader of Royston, and The Elberton Star (all of which were owned by Community Newspaper Holdings, Inc.) in exchange for The Herald Independent of Winnsboro, The Dispatch-News of Lexington, S.C., and the Marion Star & Mullins Enterprise of Marion. Later that month, CNI bought The Elbert County Examiner and combined it with the Star. In September 2000 the company purchased the Lake City Reporter, Nassau County Record, the Palatka Daily News, and the Fernandina Beach News-Leader. Those papers were formerly owned by The New York Times Company.

By August 2001, CNI had moved its headquarters into a former Coca-Cola bottling plant built in 1928 in Athens, Georgia. As of 2003, the company owned 36 weekly and three daily newspapers, as the company was pursuing the emphasis on weeklies as a differentiation strategy. By 2004, CNI owned 174 weekly newspapers, more than any other company in the U.S. A centralized approach to printing operations ("clustering"), where the multiple newspapers are printed in the same shop, saved costs.

In 2006, CNI sold the Richmond County Daily Journal (Rockingham, N.C.), the Sylvania Telephone (Sylvania, Ga.), and The Citizen News (Edgefield, S.C.). In 2014, CNI sold the Dawson News & Advertiser (Dawsonville, Ga.). In 2019, it closed the Andrews Journal and merged it with the Cherokee Scout. In 2024, CNI sold the Palatka Daily News.

In 2026, CNI sold nine newspapers to Paxton Media Group. The sale included The Franklin Press, The Highlands Highlander, Mitchell News-Journal, Smoky Mountain Times, Clay County Progress, Cherokee Scout, The Graham Star, The Blue Ridge News Observer, and Ellijay Times-Courier.

== CNI newspapers ==
- Fernandina Beach News Leader of Fernandina Beach, Florida
- Lake City Reporter of Lake City, Florida
- Nassau County Record of Callahan, Florida
- The Clayton Tribune of Clayton, Georgia
- The Dahlonega Nugget of Dahlonega, Georgia
- The Elberton Star of Elberton, Georgia
- Franklin County Citizen-Leader of Lavonia, Georgia
- The Hartwell Sun of Hartwell, Georgia
- The Northeast Georgian of Cornelia, Georgia
- The Press-Sentinel of Jesup, Georgia
- The Toccoa Record of Toccoa, Georgia
- Tribune & Georgian of St. Marys, Georgia
- White County News of Cleveland, Georgia
