= Klinke Brothers Ice Cream Company =

Defunct ice cream manufacturer in Tennessee

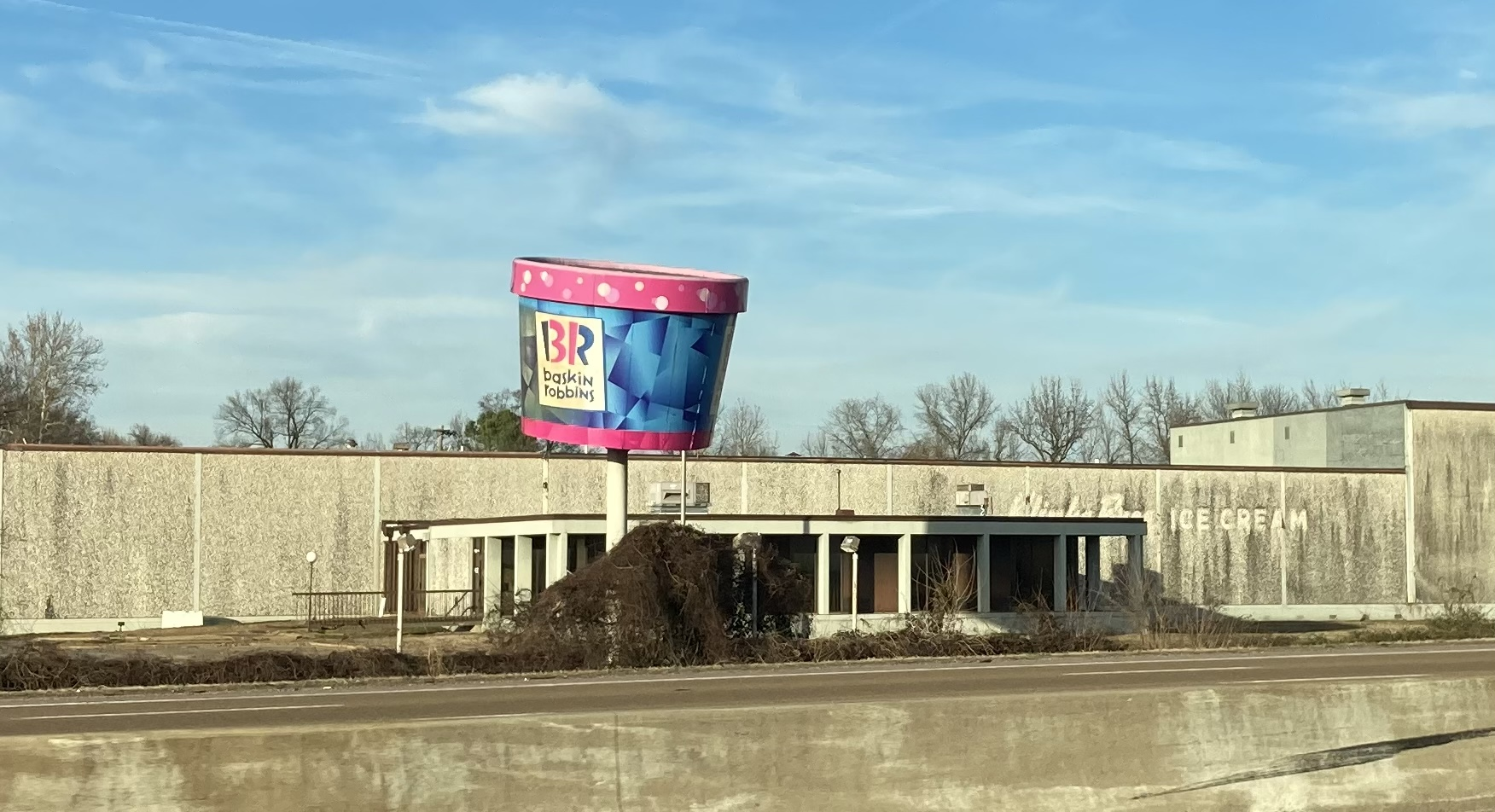
- The former Klinke Brothers' factory photographed in 2025.
- Industry: Ice cream production
- Predecessor: Bartlett Dairy Farm
- Founded: 1890; 135 years ago in Bartlett, Tennessee, United States
- Founder: William Bernard Klinke Sr.
- Defunct: 2022
- Fate: Sold
- Headquarters: Memphis, Tennessee
- Areas served: Arkansas, Georgia, Iowa, Kansas, Mississippi, Missouri, Nebraska, Oklahoma, Tennessee, Virginia
- Number of employees: 42 (2017)

Klinke Brothers Ice Cream Company was an ice cream manufacturer headquartered in Memphis, Tennessee. Founded in 1890 as a family dairy operation, it entered the ice cream production business in the 1920s and into the largest network of parlors in Baskin-Robbins' system by 2017. The company's prominent Memphis factory closed in 2022 after the company was sold.

== History ==
William Bernard Klinke Sr. began a dairy operation in Bartlett, Tennessee, in 1890. The family opened an ice cream plant in Memphis in 1923, and for several decades the factory supplied drugstore soda fountains and school cafeterias. In the mid-20th century, as soda fountains were phased out, Klinke Brothers began purchasing and operating Baskin-Robbins ice cream parlor franchises. The company sub-franchised most of its Baskin-Robbins parlors to independent owner-operators while supplying the ice cream. In 1969, it opened a plant in south Memphis visible from Interstate 240.

Klinke Brothers also made "Angel Food" brand products. In 2006, it had discontinued manufacturing the product, and licensed the brand to Yarnell Ice Cream Co. (Yarnell's). The Memphis Business Journal stated that "The Angel Food brand has been a longtime best seller in Tennessee, Mississippi and southwest Kentucky." Klinke Brothers began focusing more on its Baskin Robbins franchising operations. As of 2009, it was a supplier to 208 Baskin Robbins stores in eight U.S. states.

By 2017, Klinke Brothers had become the largest supplier and franchise holder in the Baskin-Robbins network. In 2022, the company was sold and the factory closed.

== Marketing ==
A large ice cream tub was installed at the headquarters in July 1987. Preston Klinke said that John Malmo, an advertising executive from Memphis the tub had a price tag of over $15,000 and that it paid for itself after the first six months. Due to the sale of the Angel Food brand, the tub was changed to a Baskin Robbins tub in 2009. The company Design Team from Savannah, Tennessee changed the logo in three days. It used a crane to move the tub to a parking lot, swapped the logos, and moved it back to its original position.
