= Jan Davidson =

American folklorist

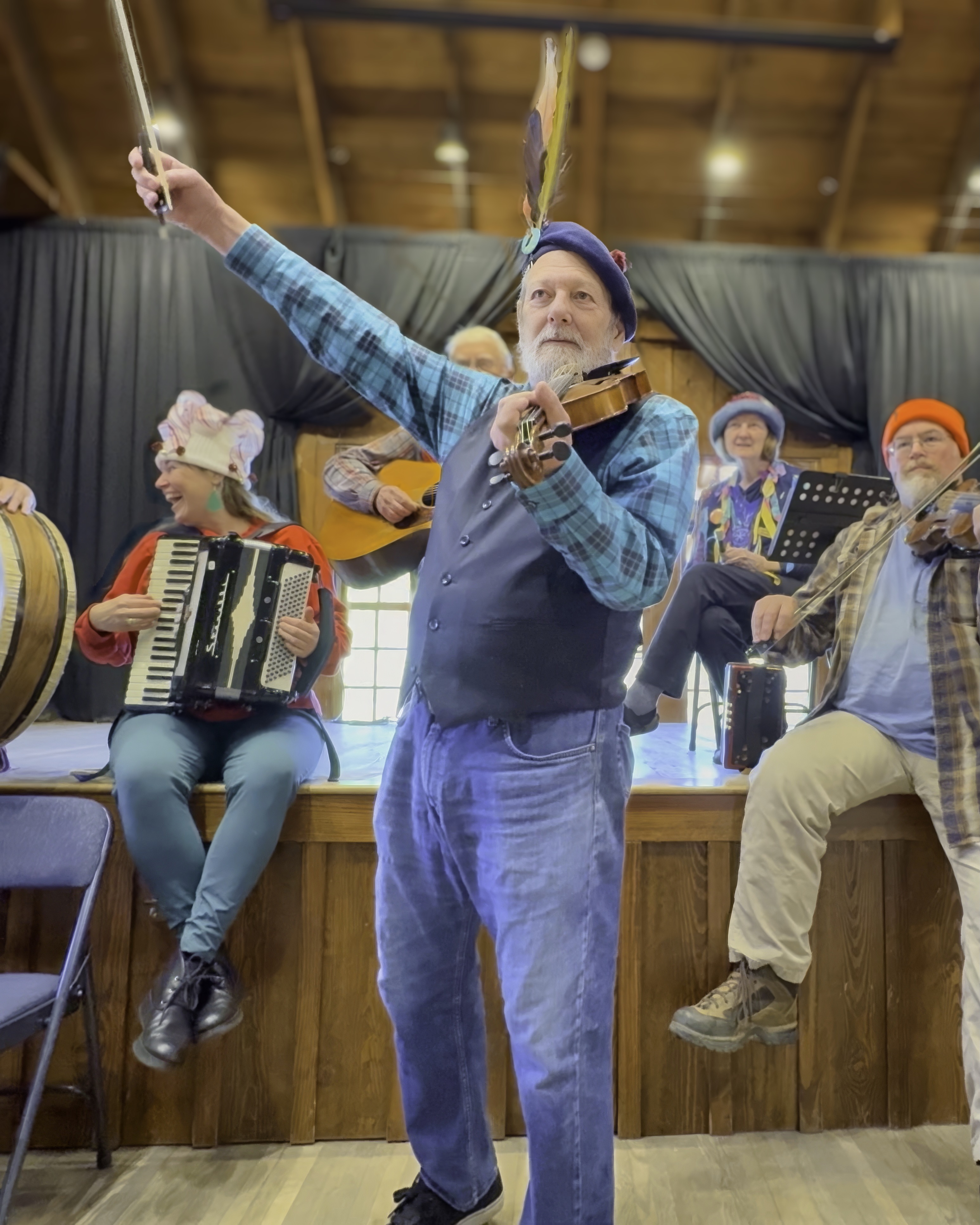
- Playing at the Folk School in 2024

Background information
- Born: John Allen Davidson Jr. Murphy, North Carolina, US
- Genres: Folk
- Occupations: Folklorist, musician, singer, writer
- Instruments: Vocals, guitar, banjo, harmonica, dulcimer, autoharp, and fiddle
- Spouse: Nanette Davidson

Jan Davidson was the longest-serving director of the John C. Campbell Folk School, the oldest and largest folk school in the United States.

== Biography ==
Davidson grew up in Murphy, North Carolina. He was given the nickname "Jan" because he was born in January. He learned to play music as a kid by watching people who played at local gas stations. When Davidson was 14, Frank Proffitt gave him his personal banjo he had made. Davidson's first job was at the Cherokee Scout newspaper. He also worked as a radio station deejay. Davidson sings and plays guitar, banjo, harmonica, dulcimer, autoharp, and fiddle, and worked at Pinewoods Camp as a staff member. One of his songs was recorded by Pete Seeger. Davidson received his Master of Arts in English from the University of North Carolina at Chapel Hill. His minor was folklore. In 1968 he traveled to Sweden as a UNC campus ambassador and visited folk schools there and in Denmark. He also studied folklore at the University of Edinburgh. Following graduate school, he worked as curator at Western Carolina University's Mountain Heritage Center for ten years. Davidson was one of the creators of the off-Broadway musical "Diamond Studs: The Life of Jesse James," which premiered at Westside Theatre in 1975. He also performed in the cast. Davidson later wrote reports and speeches for United States Senator Robert B. Morgan's office in Washington, D.C. For two years he toured as the musical director for the show "Appalachia Sounding." In 1980, Davidson's play "Rise and Fight Again," won the Guliford Prize and was staged at Carolina Theatre.

In 1981, Davidson served as the first artist in residence for Brunswick Community College and helped to set up the Brunswick Arts Council. Jan married his wife, Nanette, by 1982. Davidson served on the North Carolina Arts Council around 1992.

Davidson joined the staff of the John C. Campbell Folk School as director in 1992. During his tenure, the school expanded to a year-round schedule, annual enrollment soared from 2,500 to 6,000 students, and the number of classes offered each year surged from 150 to more than 850. Seven new studios for blacksmithing, cooking, book and paper arts, painting, woodturning, spinning, and music, were constructed during his tenure, along with new student housing. Davidson established the school's history center and led efforts to restore four historic campus buildings. He also worked to create wildlife and bird sanctuaries, build walking trails, and establish conservation easements. He established the institution's endowment as well. Jan's wife, Nanette, founded the Folk School's cooking program.

In 2007, Davidson received The North Carolina Award for Fine Arts, which is the state’s highest civilian honor. He co-produced the documentary “Sing Behind the Plow” with UNC-TV. The film earned nominations for two regional Emmy awards.

Davidson retired in March 2017. A newly-constructed building on the Folk School's campus, Davidson Hall, was named in his honor. In fall 2017, he was awarded an honorary doctorate of fine arts from the University of the South.
