= Indiana Plain Dealer =

Newspaper published in Indiana, US

The Herald-Press
- Type: Weekly newspaper
- Owner: Paxton Media Group
- President: David Holgate
- Editor: William Carroll
- Managing editor: David Nelson (Wabash); Alex Bracken (Peru); Ilene Haluska (Huntington)
- Founded: 1848 (as the Indiana Herald)
- Headquarters: 11 S. Broadway St. Peru, Indiana 46970
- Website: plaindealerin.com

Indiana Plain Dealer is a weekly newspaper covering Peru, Wabash and Huntington, Indiana. It was formed in April 2024 from the merger of the Huntington Herald-Press, Wabash Plain Dealer and Peru Tribune.

== History ==
The newspaper dates back to the founding of the Indiana Herald in 1848. It was renamed to Huntington Herald in 1887, and in 1930 it merged with Huntington Press and became the Huntington Herald-Press. In the early 1960s, Eugene C. Pulliam, owner of Central Newspapers, Inc., sold the paper to his son-in-law James C. Quayle. In 1976, Quayle's son Dan credited his election to the House of Representatives to his ties to the paper. Quayle, died in 2000 and his wife, Corrine Quayle, sold the paper in 2007 to Paxton Media Group.

The Peru Tribune was first published on April 16, 1921. Dan Nixon Newspapers sold it to Paxton Media Group in 1998 along with its sister paper, the Wabash Plain Dealer, founded in 1858. In April 2024, Paxton merged the Peru Tribune, Wabash Plain Dealer and Huntington Herald-Press together to form a new weekly publication called the Indiana Plain Dealer.
