= Wilkes Journal-Patriot =

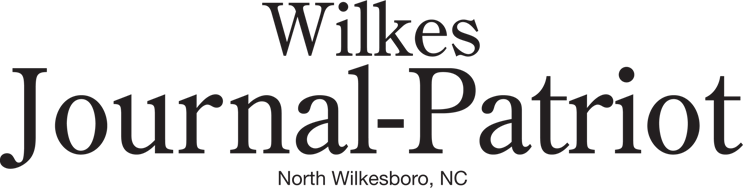

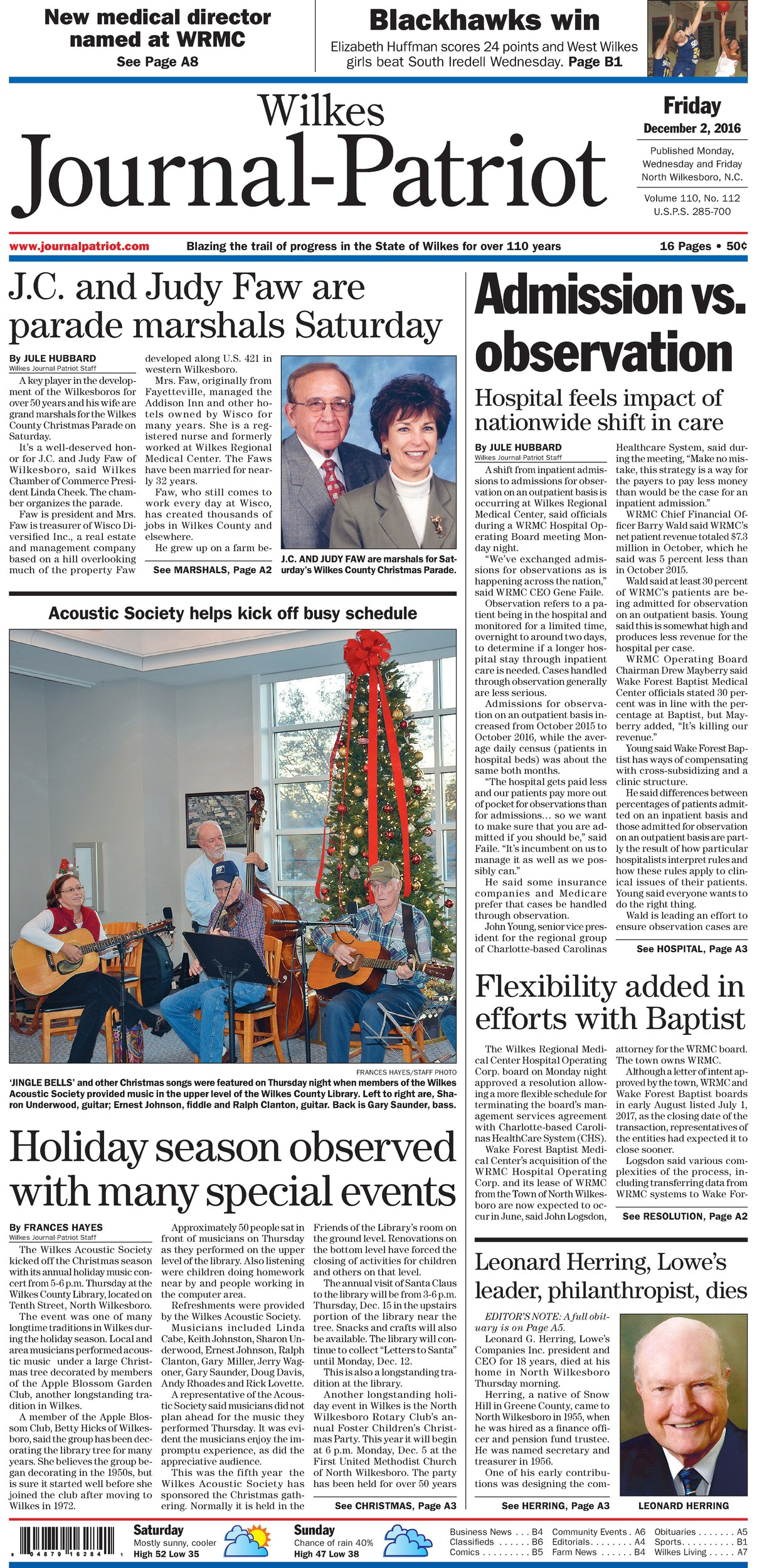
- Wilkes Journal-Patriot Front Page
- Type: Weekly newspaper
- Format: Broadsheet
- Owner: Paxton Media Group
- Publisher: Dale Morefield
- Editor: Jule Hubbard
- Founded: 1906
- Language: English
- Headquarters: 711 Main Street, North Wilkesboro, N.C. 28659
- Circulation: 11,000
- OCLC number: 54968355
- Website: journalpatriot.com

The Wilkes Journal-Patriot is a newspaper based in North Wilkesboro, Wilkes County, North Carolina and published weekly each Wednesday. At one time it was published twice per week (Tuesday and Friday). The paper has a circulation of 11,000 paid subscribers.

== History ==
The Journal-Patriot traces its beginnings to the establishment of The Wilkes Patriot by Charles H. Cowles in 1906. Cowles was a Republican politician and served as a U.S. Congressman from 1907 to 1911. Under Cowles' guidance, the Patriot became one of the few Republican-leaning newspapers in North Carolina at the time. The Wilkes Journal was founded in 1917. A former typesetter for the Patriot, Julius C. Hubbard, became its editor. Hubbard and Cowles eventually became partners after the two newspapers merged in 1932.

As of August 13, 2014, Jule Hubbard is the editor of the Journal-Patriot, succeeding Charles Williams and was also one of the owners. The publisher was Rebecca Hubbard, who was also one of the owners.

The Wilkes Journal-Patriot has sections covering news, sports, events, obituaries, and lifestyles, and it contains an opinion and classifieds section.

The Journal-Patriot remained a family-owned newspaper until its sale to Paxton Media Group effective September 1, 2020. Dale Morefield of The Enquirer-Journal became publisher.
