= Chronicle-Tribune =

American newspaper in Indiana

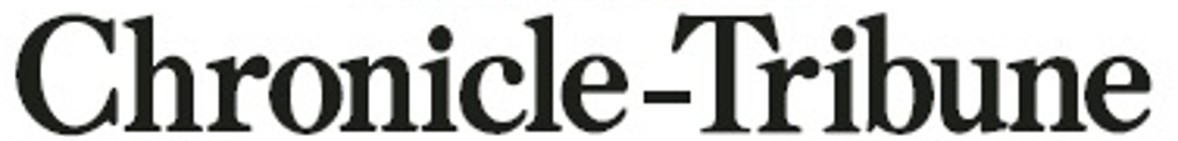
- The February 14, 2007 front page of Chronicle-Tribune
- Type: Daily newspaper
- Format: Broadsheet
- Owner: Paxton Media Group
- Publisher: Linda Kelsay
- Editor: Andrew Maciejewski
- Founded: 1865 (as The Marion Chronicle)
- Headquarters: 610 South Adams Street; Marion, Indiana 46953; United States
- Circulation: 12,179 Daily; 14,337 Sunday
- Website: chronicle-tribune.com

The Chronicle-Tribune is a morning newspaper for Marion, Indiana and surrounding areas.

== History ==
The Chronicle-Tribune was created in 1968 when The Marion Chronicle (established in 1865 as an evening newspaper) was combined with The Marion Leader-Tribune (established in 1912 as a morning newspaper); the papers had published a combined Sunday edition under the Chronicle-Tribune name. It was published as an all-day newspaper with morning and evening editions until the evening edition was eliminated in 1973. The paper was purchased by Gannett Co. in 1971.

In May 2007, Gannett donated the Chronicle-Tribune to the Gannett Foundation. On July 2, 2007, the paper was sold to Paxton Media Group. With the purchase, the Chronicle-Tribune became the 10th Paxton property in Indiana and the largest.
