= Log Cabin Democrat =

Newspaper in Conway, Arkansas

- Type: Daily newspaper
- Format: Broadsheet
- Owner: Paxton Media Group
- Publisher: David Meadows
- Founded: July 1879
- Language: English
- Headquarters: 1025 Front Street. Conway, AR 72032; United States
- Website: thecabin.net

The Log Cabin Democrat is a daily newspaper in Conway, Arkansas, United States, serving Conway and Faulkner County and some surrounding areas. It was founded in July 1879 as The Log Cabin. Its publisher is David Meadows, who also serves as the publisher of The Courier in Russellville.

== History ==
The founding publisher, Able F. Livingston, was a former Whig Party member, who used the party's symbol — the log cabin — as the name for his new enterprise. Ownership changed a handful of times early in the newspaper's existence, eventually passing to the family of J.W. Robins in 1894. The Robins family continued to be involved with the newspaper directly for five generations. Along the way, J.W. Underhill, a one-time owner of The Log Cabin, purchased assets of a smaller Conway newspaper, The Democrat, which operated from 1881 to 1885 and had been revived in 1899. Underhill married into the Robins family, and the two papers merged as The Log Cabin Democrat in late 1900. The daily edition of the newspaper debuted in 1908 in conjunction with coverage of the opening of the Arkansas Normal School, later renamed the University of Central Arkansas.

The newspaper's main office has been on downtown Conway's Front Street since 1980, after operating from offices on Oak Street for 80 years. In addition to its primary print edition, the newspaper publishes several secondary products. Since its online debut in 1997, TheCabin.net has been augmented with multiple specialty websites through Morris DigitalWorks, covering niches such as dining, wedding planning, and local entertainment.

The newspaper was operated by Morris Publishing Group which assumed full ownership in the mid-1990s. In 2017, Morris sold its newspapers to GateHouse Media. By June 2019, the newspaper changed hands again, to Paducah, Kentucky-based Paxton Media Group, as part of a four-publication acquisition in the state.
