= The Dahlonega Nugget =

- "The Gold of the News"
- Type: Weekly newspaper
- Owner: Community Newspapers, Inc.
- Founders: William G. McNelley; S.H. Williams
- Publisher: John Bynum
- Editor: Matt Aiken
- Metro editor: Keith Murden
- Founded: March 14, 1890; 136 years ago
- Language: English
- Headquarters: 1074 Morrison Moore Pkwy W, Dahlonega, GA 30533
- City: Dahlonega, GA
- Country: United States
- Circulation: 6,400
- OCLC number: 18486914
- Website: www.thedahloneganugget.com

The Dahlonega Nugget is a local newspaper in Dahlonega, Georgia. It is published once a week on Wednesdays, with a circulation of about 5,000 copies. The newspaper is currently owned by Community Newspapers, Inc., which also owns papers in Florida and North Carolina.

The newspaper's name references a gold strike that occurred in Dahlonega in the early 1800s. This is further indicated by the paper's motto: "The Gold of the News."

== Early History ==
The Dahlonega Nugget was founded in 1890 by William G. McNelley and S. H. Williams. The first issue was printed on a hand-cranked printing press on March 14, 1890. It was four pages long with seven columns. There are no archived copies of this first issue; all subsequent editions can be viewed on microfilm at the Lumpkin County Library.

Williams bought McNelley's stake in the paper and subsequently moved operations to Cleveland, Georgia. There, he changed the publication's masthead to The Cleveland Progress. McNelley then decided to return to Dahlonega and restarted The Dahlonega Nugget.

== William Benjamin Franklin Townsend ==
William Benjamin Franklin Townsend (July 12, 1855 – June 13, 1933) first learned how to write and publish newspapers at Dahlonega's first newspaper the Mountain Signal. He became the editor and publisher of The Dahlonega Nugget in 1897, when he leased the newspaper's printing equipment with only five dollars in capital, and continued to hold these positions until his death in 1933. Townsend's editorials were particularly popular for their homespun wit and charm and were published in papers across the country and in Canada.The Department of Journalism of the University of Oregon reported in 1915 that the newspaper was one of three top country papers in the United States. The paper became so popular that even though Townsend purchased the paper on three years' credit, he was able to pay off the debt in only two years. Despite the newspaper's widespread appeal, Townsend was forced to limit his circulation to 1,000 copies, as his hand-cranked press could not keep up with the demand.

Though Townsend's articles were widely published, he lacked even a grammar school education. Oftentimes, many of the words in his pieces were misspelled, indicating his lack of formal training. He also composed his articles while simultaneously setting the type by hand. This lack of proofreading led to even more grammatical, spelling, and typographical errors in the paper.

Because Townsend composed his articles in a straightforward manner and rarely deleted the names of the individuals involved in the events he wrote about, he was regularly threatened with libel suits. In 1929, Townsend was sued by J. H. Moore, the commissioner of Lumpkin County for $25,000. Moore claimed that Townsend slanderously alleged that he was guilty of fixing juries. This marked the first time Townsend was sued. Prior to this case, other disgruntled subjects of Townsend's columns started fistfights with the editor.

Townsend did not print obituaries in The Dahlonega Nugget while he served as the editor.

Somehow, despite the ever increasing popularity of the paper, Townsend also found time to serve his community as a banker, justice of the peace, constable, mayor, alderman, herb seller, bailiff, tax collector, and city marshal.

Townsend would regularly sleep at The Dahlonega Nugget's office, only returning home to see his wife and five children during meals.

Townsend disapproved of concrete sidewalks, as he thought they cost too much money to install. His dislike of these paved walkways was so great that he refused to walk on any he came across. He also criticized Dahlonega's water system for drawing water from a natural spring situated near the local graveyard. Even though tests showed the water was pure, he referred to Dahlonega's tap water as "graveyard juice" and preferred to drink from wells.

Contrary to most other contemporary newspaper editors in Georgia, Townsend believed that it would be impossible to enforce the Volstead Act.

Townsend's last column before his death read, "Ye editor is sick." He died on Tuesday, June 13, 1933 in The Dahlonega Nugget's office.

== Post-Townsend History ==
After the elder Townsend's death in 1933, the newspaper was passed down to his son Jody Townsend, who collaborated with his uncle J. Goley Townsend. The Townsends sold the paper in 1944 to William M. Smith and Mary Lou B. Smith.

The Smiths proved to be controversial owners of the small town, country newspaper. Their editorials against keeping chickens and pigs in town upset many of the newspaper's subscribers, and several cancelled their subscriptions. As the debate concerning the care of chickens and pigs in Dahlonega raged, a new column was added to the newspaper called "Both Sides" to handle the complaints the paper received during this time. The Smiths also found they did not have the time necessary to keep up with the demands of the newspaper business, as they devoted much of their energies to managing The Smith House, a renowned restaurant in Dahlonega that is still in operation today. They were also simultaneously involved in founding a school for underprivileged children called Fort Smith Academy. After missing the printing of three issues, the Smiths decided to sell the paper to Frances Conner in 1946.

Frances Conner, who had previously worked for the Atlanta Journal, was only twenty four when she bought The Dahlonega Nugget. Unlike her predecessors, Conner studied journalism at both North Georgia College and Northwestern University. Under her guidance, the newspaper's regional reputation was restored and the paper's circulation more than doubled from 376 subscribers to 1,000. She was the first editor to include images in the newspaper. She also increased the price of advertisements from about two cents per inch to thirty-eight cents per inch, which ensured the newspaper turned a profit again.

On the 58th anniversary of the founding of the newspaper, on March 4, 1949, Jack Parks took on the role of publisher. His homespun style of writing recalled the popular editorials of William Benjamin Franklin Townsend and garnered national attention. An article by Parks that was published on April 20, 1951 concerning the firing of General Douglas MacArthur gained national acclaim for the following amusing quote: "We had planned to write a thunderous editorial this week on the firing of General MacArthur, but we regret to report that news from Yaahoola and Frogtown, plus other disturbances in and around Dahlonega have crowded the General off the front page of The Nugget." Parks sold the newspaper to Community Newspapers, Inc. in 1981 but continued to work at the paper until his retirement in 1892.

Parks was succeeded by Mike Pendleton, who also covered the sports and news sections. Dorsey Martin followed Pendleton, and Joe Kisselburg followed Martin. In 1996, Terrie Ellerbee became editor of the paper. She also took on the role of publisher in 1998. She resigned from both of these posts in 2008. Wayne Knuckles was then appointed editor and publisher until 2013.

In 2014, Matt Aiken was named the new editor of the paper.

== Coverage ==
Every Wednesday, the Dahlonega Nugget publishes coverage of local sports, news, community events, and business from its hometown. Its website, which was updated to its current format in 2015, is further categorized into 10 sections, including obituaries, archives, classifieds, and sports. The majority of the sports coverage focuses on Lumpkin County Middle School and Lumpkin County High School. Since March 2015, The Dahlonega Nugget has also offered an online e-edition of its most recent issue each week for subscribers.

In the 1980s, Anne Dislikes Amerson began a weekly column entitled "I Remember Dahlonega." For this column, Amerson interviewed Dahlonega natives to learn about their experiences living in the small town.

The newspaper serves the entirety of Lumpkin County as well as the nearby communities of Dawsonville, Murrayville, Suches and Cleveland.

== Honors and awards ==
- Madeleine K. Anthony Award (2013) - Lumpkin County Historical Society
- 1st Place, Feature Writing, Division E (2018) - Georgia Press Association, Better Newspaper Contest
- 2nd Place, Business Writing, Division E (2018) - Georgia Press Association, Better Newspaper Contest
- 2nd Place, Hal M. Stanley Trophy, Division E (2018) - Georgia Press Association, Better Newspaper Contest
- 2nd Place, Page One, Division E (2018) - Georgia Press Association, Better Newspaper Contest
- 3rd Place, General Excellence, Division E (2018) - Georgia Press Association, Better Newspaper Contest

== See also ==
- Dahlonega, Georgia
- List of newspapers in the United States
- List of newspapers in Georgia (U.S. state)
