= The Southern Illinoisan =

Newspaper in Carbondale, Illinois

- Type: Daily newspaper
- Format: Broadsheet
- Owner: Paxton Media Group
- Headquarters: 600 Halfway Road, Suite 105, Marion, IL
- Circulation: 7,220 Daily (as of 2022)
- Website: thesouthern.com

Logo of The Southern Illinoisan (August 13, 2014)

The Southern Illinoisan is a daily newspaper and multimedia news platform based in Marion, Illinois, known locally as "The Southern." It is one of the major regional newspapers and media services for southern Illinois. The Southern published a physical paper on Tuesdays, Thursdays and Saturdays and a digital copy seven days a week.

Upon Paxton Media Group’s acquisition of The Southern Illinoisan, Marlyn Halstead, a veteran journalist with extensive experience in Southern Illinois newsrooms, became the editor.

It was formerly based in Carbondale.

== History ==
The Southern Illinoisan was created in 1947 when Lindsay-Schaub Newspapers of Decatur, Illinois, purchased three area newspapers—the Daily Free Press of Carbondale, the Murphysboro Daily Independent and the Herrin Daily Journal—and merged them into a single publication. Lee Enterprises purchased the Southern Illinoisan and other Lindsay-Schaub papers in 1979.

In 2018, news room staff voted to unionize following an unannounced mass layoff earlier in the year.

In 2020, the newspaper moved from one Carbondale office to another.

Starting June 20, 2023, the print edition of the newspaper was reduced to three days a week: Tuesday, Thursday and Saturday. The newspaper also transitioned from being delivered by a traditional newspaper delivery carrier to mail delivery by the U.S. Postal Service.

In October 2023, Lee Enterprises sold the newspaper to Paxton Media Group. Lee Enterprises' sale of The Southern Illinoisan was delayed after pushback from the newspapers union guild. The guild contested the sale after learning that the new owners, Paxton Media Group, would not be retaining any of the guild employees once the sale was final. Paxton Media Group were officially handed the reins of the newspaper on Monday, Dec. 11, 2023 and all news staff employees who were formerly working at the newspaper under Lee Enterprises were subsequently let go under Paxton rule.
