= The Press-Sentinel =

- Publisher: Eric Denty
- Editor: Drew Davis
- Founded: 1977
- Headquarters: 252 W. Walnut St. Jesup, Georgia 31545
- Website: https://www.thepress-sentinel.com/

The Press-Sentinel is a local newspaper in Jesup, Georgia, United States.

== History ==
The newspaper was created in 1977 from the merging of two competing newspapers, the Wayne County Press and the Jesup Sentinel, both of which probably existed most of a century before that time. The earlier origins of the paper are difficult to verify, as most records were destroyed in a fire in 1926, but certain pieces of information date from the 1880s. It currently has a circulation approximately close to 10,000, mostly within Wayne County, Georgia.

Since 1983, it is wholly owned by W.H. "Dink" NeSmith Jr., who owns it as part of Community Newspapers, Inc., also owned by him. Partner of the same corporation and president of the newspaper since 1997, Eric Denty serves as editor-in-chief.
