= The Clayton Tribune =

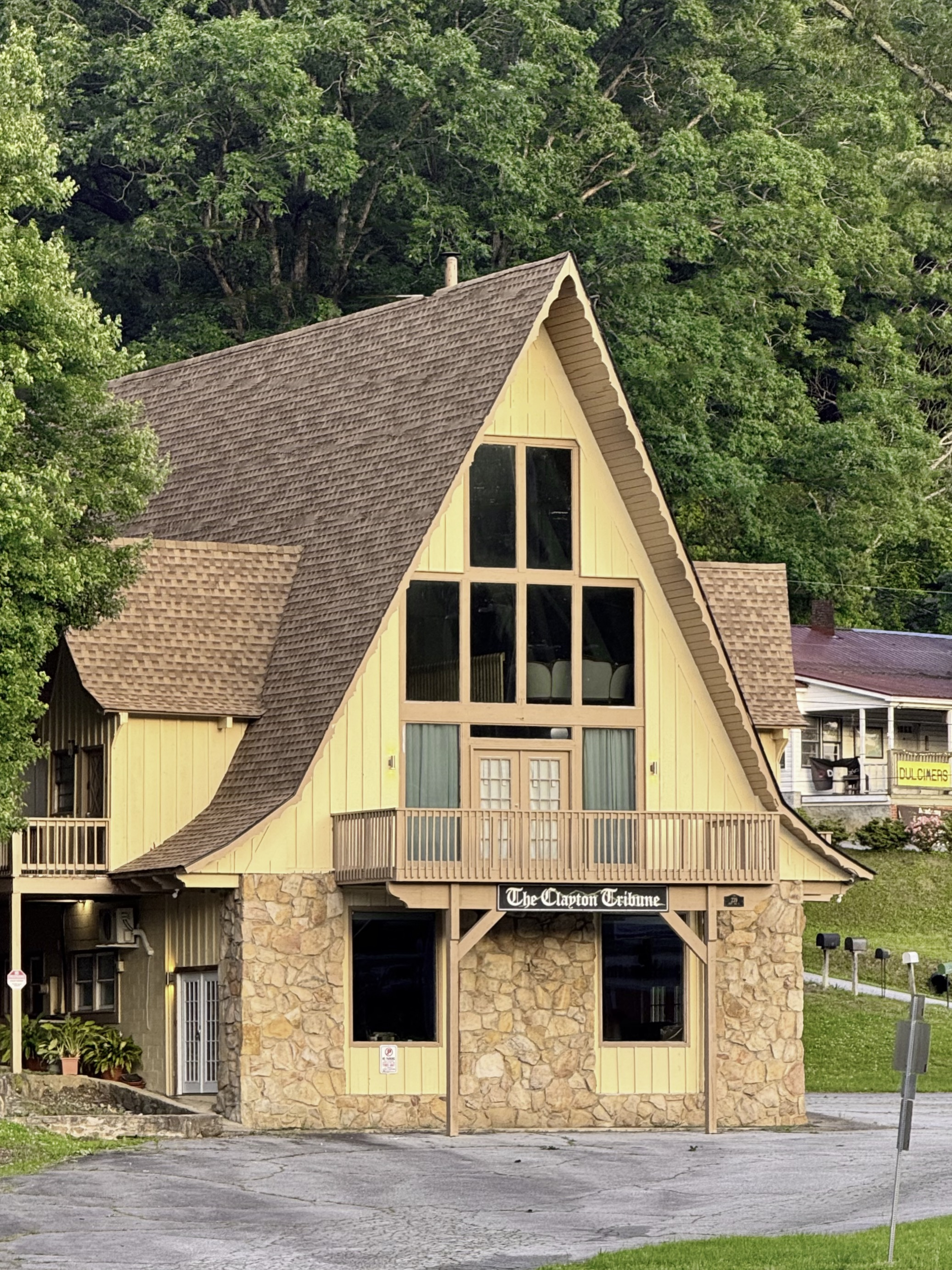
- The Clayton Tribune newspaper's main office
- Type: Weekly
- Format: Print, digital
- Owner: Community Newspapers, Inc.
- Publisher: Enoch Autry
- Staff writers: Tony Penrose - Senior Sales Associate / Advertising Consultant, Jimmy Eden - Graphic Artist
- Founded: 1897
- Headquarters: Clayton, Georgia
- Circulation: 6,200
- Website: www.theclaytontribune.com

The Clayton Tribune is a local newspaper in the Clayton, Georgia. The newspaper is published weekly and is owned by Community Newspapers, Inc. of Athens, Georgia. Enoch Autry is the publisher. The newspaper has about 6,200 in circulation weekly and is a source for local news, businesses, sports, and classifieds in Clayton and in Rabun County, Georgia.

== History ==
The Clayton Tribune was founded in 1897 by J.A. Reynolds. He started the newspaper with a single hand press in Rabun County. Reynolds operated the newspaper until 1914, when he sold the newspaper to Frank Singleton. Singleton modernized the company, using a new electrical press. The newspaper's circulation grew to over 7,500.
