= The News-Gazette =

The News-Gazette may refer to:

- The News-Gazette (Champaign–Urbana), a daily newspaper serving the Champaign–Urbana Metropolitan Area and Danville, Illinois
- The News-Gazette (Winchester, Indiana), a daily newspaper based in Winchester, Indiana
- Osceola News-Gazette, a weekly newspaper based in Osceola County, Florida
- Grayson County News Gazette, a semi-daily newspaper published on Wednesdays and Saturdays in Leitchfield, Kentucky
- Novaya Gazeta (lit. 'New Gazette'), a newspaper in Russia
