= Daily Star (Louisiana) =

Newspaper published in Hammond, Louisiana, United States

- Type: Daily newspaper
- Format: Broadsheet
- Owner: Paxton Media Group
- Publisher: Mark Elliot
- Editor: Lil Mirando
- Founded: November 1959
- Headquarters: 1010 C.M. Fagan Drive, Hammond, Louisiana, United States
- Circulation: 4,000

The Daily & Sunday Star is a newspaper published in Hammond, Louisiana, by the Daily Star Publishing Company. Currently, the publisher is Mark Elliot and the executive editor is Lil Mirando.

The newspaper is a member of the Associated Press and the Louisiana Press Association, The newspaper focuses on happenings in Tangipahoa Parish, where Hammond is located, and in Livingston Parish and St. Helena Parish, the three civil parishes (counties in other states) of its home-delivery circulation area.

== History ==
The Daily Star began on November 12, 1959, as The Hammond Press, which on December 23 of the same year retitled itself The Hammond Item. The Daily & Sunday Star is the sole daily newspaper published in Hammond (as of 2011). Its Sunday edition is The Sunday Star; The Daily Star is issued on five weekdays (Tuesday through Saturday, as of 2011).

In 2007, The Daily Star changed from being an afternoon newspaper to publishing in the morning, thereby within its three-parish circulation area competing head-to-head with The Advocate (Baton Rouge) and The Times-Picayune (New Orleans). The Daily Star has held its own by nuancing to this competitive environment in Louisiana's fastest-growing region. As of 2013, it had a paid circulation above 12 thousand, free (shopping) circulation of 35 thousand, and prodigious advertising, especially in the Thursday and Sunday editions. The Sunday Star circulates USA Weekend and includes a full comics section.

Over the years The Daily Star has been owned by various media corporations. In 2013 it was owned by Paxton Media Group, headquartered in Kentucky.

By late 2020, The Daily Star only publishes on Tuesday, Thursday, and Saturday.

== Role in Hurricane Katrina news ==
In 2005, during Hurricane Katrina and its aftermath, the Star (as it is often called locally) continued operation via emergency measures and skipped paper publication on just one day — Tuesday August 30 - the only date since 1959 that the Star had not published as scheduled. In the meantime, even on that Tuesday as during the preceding weekend, the Star staff was at work and, with the public power outage, used generators and laptop computers to maintain the newspaper's web site; issues for August 31 and September 1 and 2 were printed in Denham Springs. During and after the storm the Star facilities in Hammond served as the temporary operations center for the Associated Press New Orleans bureau and as the temporary reporting-base for several newspapers from around the country in covering the New Orleans situation. With just one day of interrupted publication on paper, the Star published accounts of the hurricane and its aftermath, including controversies related to the Federal Emergency Management Agency (FEMA).

== Opinion page ==
The Daily Star carries various national, state, and local columns.The Star's editorial policy is politically non-aligned, but occasionally since 1986 the newspaper has endorsed candidates. A major feature of The Daily Star is its letters to the editor, which are often vigorous about local or state issues and provide unique grassroots commentary.
