= Palatka Daily News =

Newspaper in Florida, US

- Type: Daily newspaper
- Format: Broadsheet
- Owner: Charlie Douglas
- Founder: 1885
- Publisher: Jennifer Moates
- Editor: Brandon Oliver
- Political alignment: Liberal
- Language: English
- Headquarters: 1825 St. Johns Avenue; Palatka, Florida 32177; United States
- Circulation: 4,500
- OCLC number: 34298353
- Website: PalatkaDailyNews.com

The Palatka Daily News is a local newspaper in Palatka, Florida, United States. It publishes on Wednesdays, Thursdays and Saturdays. Coverage includes local news, sports and community events in Putnam County.

== History ==
The Palatka Daily News was founded in 1885. The newspaper was purchased by The New York Times Company in 1972, who sold it Community Newspapers, Inc. in 2000.

In April 2023, the newspaper decreased the number of print editions from five a week to three.

In June 2024, the newspaper was sold to Charlie Douglas who operates the paper under the name Blue Crab Publishing LLC. The following month the newspaper announced it was closing its printing press and laid off several employees.
