= WFKN =

Radio station in Franklin, Kentucky

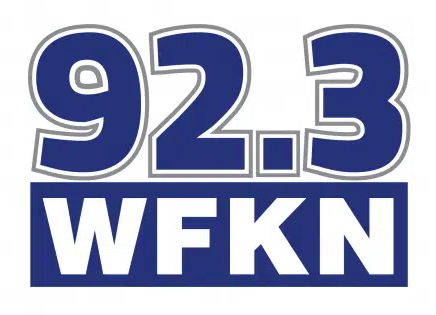
- Franklin, Kentucky; United States
- Broadcast area: Simpson County, Kentucky
- Frequency: 1220 kHz
- Branding: The Best Country Around

Programming
- Format: Country music

Ownership
- Owner: Paxton Media Group; (WFKN, LLC)

History
- First air date: April 1954
- Call sign meaning: Franklin

Technical information
- Licensing authority: FCC
- Facility ID: 24245
- Class: D
- Power: 250 watts (day); 90 watts (night)
- Transmitter coordinates: 36°44′20″N 86°34′42″W
- Translator: 92.3 W222CZ (Franklin)

Links
- Public license information: Public file; LMS
- Webcast: Listen live
- Website: 923wfkn.com

WFKN (1220 AM) is a radio station broadcasting a country music format. Licensed to Franklin, Kentucky, United States. The station is currently owned by the Paxton Media Group through WFKN, LLC. The station shares ownership with Franklin's local paper, the weekly Franklin Favorite.

== History ==
The station began operations in April 1954 under ownership of the Franklin Favorite, a weekly newspaper. Although it was acquired by the Henderson Gleaner-Journal in 1974, the station remained under control of the Favorite.

The station has long gone without any FM companion until the mid-2010s, when low-power translator W222CZ was launched.
