= Lake City Reporter =

Daily American newspaper

Coordinates: 30°11′21.26″N 82°38′7.82″W

- Type: Daily newspaper
- Owner: Community Newspapers, Inc.
- Founded: 1874
- Language: English
- Headquarters: 180 E. Duval Street, Lake City, FL 32055 United States
- Circulation: 6,500
- Website: lakecityreporter.com

Lake City Reporter is a daily newspaper founded in 1875 and based in Lake City, Florida.

== History ==
The origins of the Lake City Reporter first began with C. A. Finley in 1875 when he initially began the publication as a county weekly. Finley remained with the paper until 1889.

The Lake City Reporter was not a profitable publication until J.M. Dodd purchased it. J.M. Dodd first worked in the newspaper industry in Kentucky. Dodd had a newspaper office in Henderson, Kentucky but was destroyed by Federal forces in the American Civil War and was subsequently imprisoned on Johnson's Island in Lake Erie. After the war Dodd established the first newspaper in Hopkinsville, Kentucky called the Hopkinsville Observer. In 1889 Dodd decided to sell all of his property in Kentucky and moved to Lake City where he purchased the Lake City Reporter. Dodd managed to increase the circulation of the Lake City Reporter up to his death in 1890. His son Herbert Dodd had learned about the newspaper industry from his father and continued to operate the Lake City Reporter making it a popular publication in Columbia County.

In 1972 The New York Times Company bought the Lake City Reporter. The newspaper was purchased by Community Newspapers, Inc. in September 2000.
