= News-Topic =

Newspaper published in Lenoir, North Carolina

The News-Topic
- Type: Daily newspaper
- Owner: Paxton Media Group
- Publisher: Caldwell Publishing Company
- Editor: Ritchie Starnes
- Founded: 1875
- Language: American English
- Headquarters: 123 Pennton Avenue; Lenoir, North Carolina 28645
- City: Lenoir
- Country: United States
- OCLC number: 26652822
- Website: newstopicnews.com

The News-Topic (formerly the Lenoir News-Topic, which was a consolidation of the earlier Lenoir News and Lenoir Topic) is an American, English language newspaper published daily (except Sun.) in Lenoir, North Carolina and serving all of Caldwell County, North Carolina.

The News-Topic was formerly owned by Worrell Newspapers of Charlottesville, Virginia. The New York Times Company acquired eight daily papers, including the News-Topic, from Worrell in 1982. The News Topic is a member of the North Carolina Press Association. It is currently owned by the Paxton Media Group, which purchased it from The New York Times Company in 1995. Ritchie Starnes is the publisher and editor, Kaitlyn Eller is the advertising director, and Mike Lambert is circulation director.

== See also ==
- List of newspapers in North Carolina
