= News-Democrat & Leader =

American newspaper

- Type: Biweekly newspaper
- Owner: Paxton Media Group
- Editor: Chris Cooper
- Staff writers: Kelly Phillips
- Founded: 1806
- Language: English
- Headquarters: 120 Public Square, Russellville, Kentucky, United States
- Website: Official website

For the Illinois newspaper, please see Belleville News-Democrat.

The News-Democrat & Leader is a twice-weekly newspaper in Russellville, Kentucky. It has been published since 1806, fourteen years after Kentucky became a state. Russellville is the county seat of Logan County.

The current title was formed with the merging of The Logan County News and The Democrat in 1911. Then in 1968, employees of the News-Democrat started a paper called The Logan Leader. A few months later, this was merged back into the original company, which published the papers under different names each week. In the 1990s, this was changed to a publication under the combined name of News-Democrat & Leader.

The paper was previously owned by Heartland Publications. In 2012 Versa Capital Management merged Heartland, Ohio Community Media, former Freedom papers it had acquired, and Impressions Media into a new company, Civitas Media. Civitas Media sold the News-Democrat & Leader to Paxton Media Group in 2017.

An unrelated News-Democrat was published in Paducah, Kentucky from 1901 to 1929.
