= The Daily Citizen (Searcy) =

Newspaper in Arkansas

- Type: Daily newspaper
- Format: Broadsheet
- Owner: Paxton Media Group
- Founded: September 1854
- Language: English
- Headquarters: 723 W. Beebe-Capps Expressway; Searcy, AR 72143; United States
- Website: thedailycitizen.com

The Daily Citizen is a newspaper which is published every day except Mondays and Saturdays in Searcy, Arkansas. It is owned by Paxton Media Group.

== History ==
The newspaper was founded in September 1854 as the Des Arc Citizen. In 1862 during the American Civil War, Union forces destroyed the Citizen's printing facilities; publication did not resume until 1866. The paper was purchased in 1885 by James J. Baugh, who moved operations to Searcy and renamed it the White County Citizen. Ownership of the newspaper passed to Baugh's son-in-law, M.P. Jones Jr., in 1940. The paper remained in the Jones family until it was sold to Harte-Hanks Communications in 1977. It was later sold to Worrell Enterprises, which sold it to Paxton Media Group in 1991.
