= The Franklin Press =

Weekly newspaper in Franklin, North Carolina

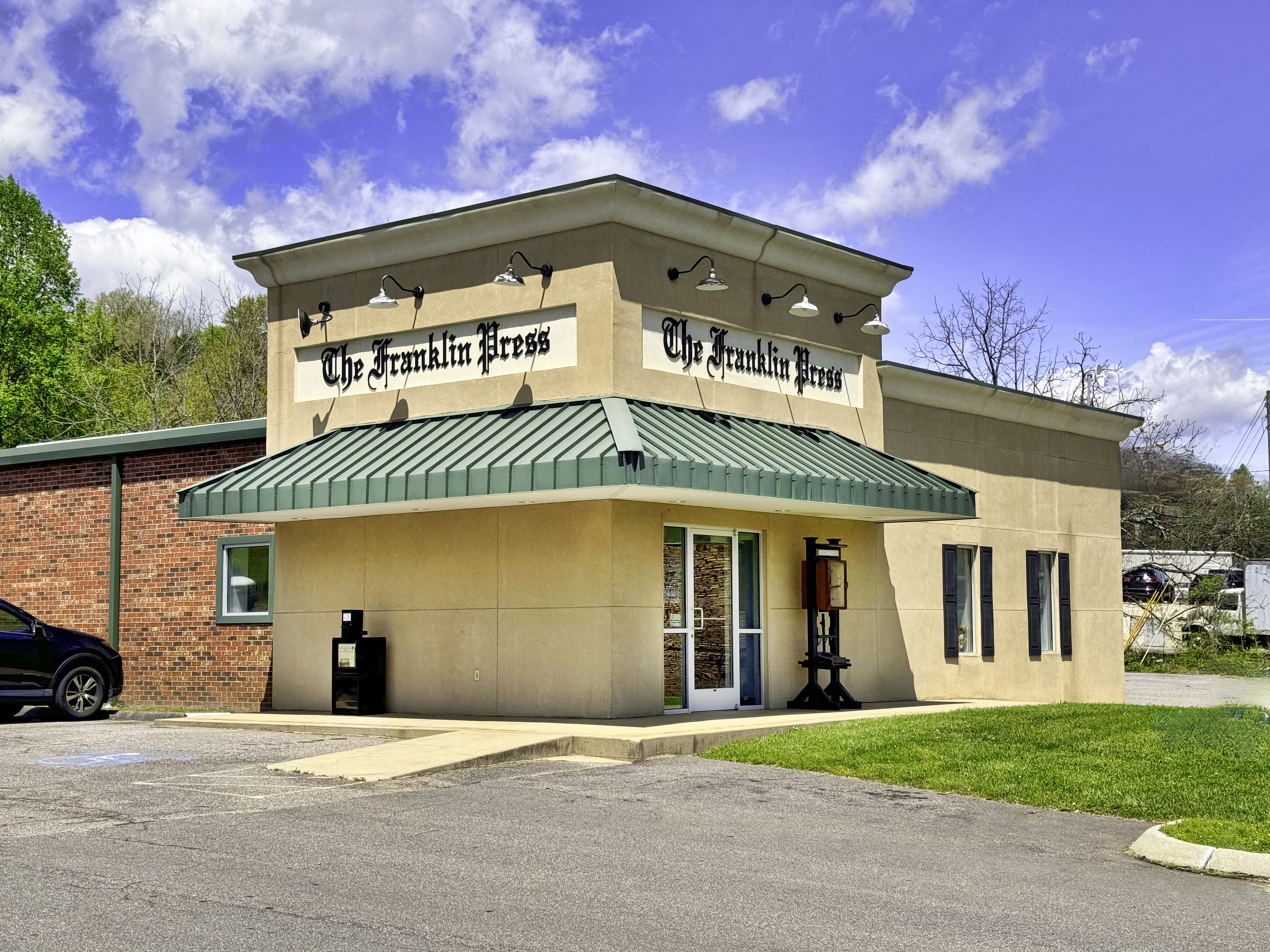
- The main office of The Franklin Press
- Type: Weekly newspaper
- Format: Broadsheet
- Owner: Paxton Media Group
- Publisher: Rachel Hoskins
- Editor: Lee Buchanan
- Founded: 1886
- Headquarters: Franklin, NC, 28744; United States
- Circulation: 6,000
- OCLC number: 25486561
- Website: thefranklinpress.com

The Franklin Press is a weekly newspaper in Franklin, North Carolina, and Macon County. It is one of the largest and oldest newspapers in far-west North Carolina.

The print edition is published on Wednesdays and has a circulation of 6,000. The Press also publishes an annual medical directory and special sections.

== History ==
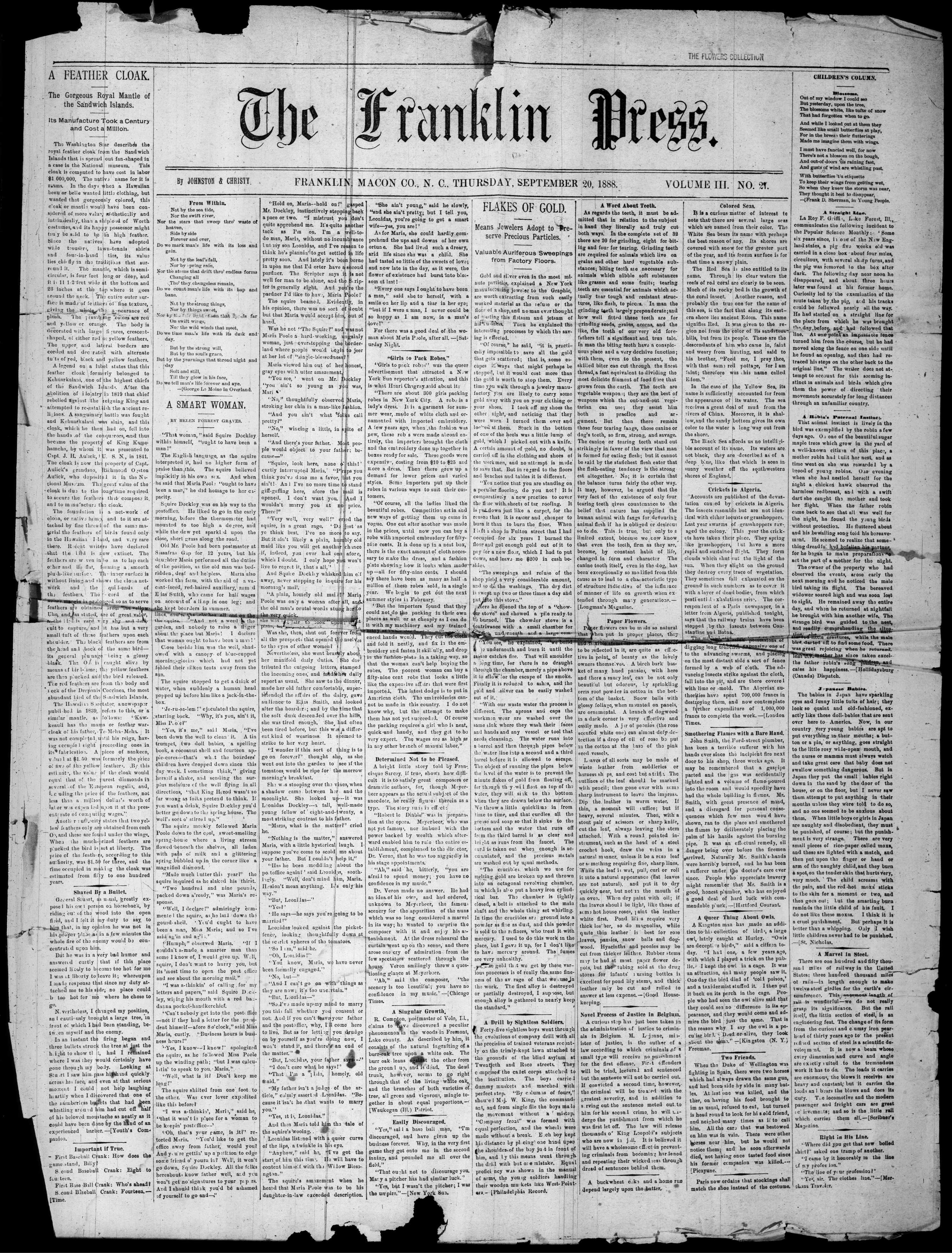
The front page on September 20, 1888

The Franklin Press was preceded by four other Macon County newspapers: the Macon Advance, The Franklin Observer, The Western Carolinian, and The Western Reporter. None of them lasted more than a few years. The Franklin Press was founded in 1886 by T.J. Christy of Athens, Georgia. Today it is the oldest extant business in Macon County.

Shortly after its establishment the Press was sold to W.A. Curtis. Later owners included Bob Sloan and Jerue Babb, who started Community Newspapers, Inc. in the late 1960s.

In 2003, the Franklin Press headquarters at Depot and Wayah streets was modernized. The newspaper's Franklin press also prints newspapers for the neighboring cities of Bryson City, Cashiers, Highlands, and Spruce Pine.

In 2026, Community Newspapers Inc. sold the Press and eight other papers to Paxton Media Group.

== See also ==
- List of newspapers published in North Carolina
