= List of periodicals named Gazette =

Gazette has been a popular name for newspapers and other periodicals. Following is a list of publications of these types that have borne the name.

== English-language newspapers ==
=== Belize ===
- Honduras Gazette, a weekly newspaper and government gazette

=== Botswana ===
- The Botswana Gazette, a daily newspaper published in Gaborone

=== Canada ===
- The Gazette (Montreal) in Montreal, Quebec
- The Gazette (Newfoundland), the official newspaper of Memorial University of Newfoundland, in St. John's
- The Dalhousie Gazette, a student newspaper for Dalhousie University in Nova Scotia
- UWO Gazette, a daily student newspaper for the University of Western Ontario in London, Ontario

=== New Zealand ===
- New Zealand Gazette, the official publication of the New Zealand Government

=== United Kingdom ===
- The Belfast Gazette, Northern Ireland official public record
- Eastbourne Gazette, Eastbourne, England
- Stornoway Gazette, Outer Hebrides, Scotland
- The Edinburgh Gazette, Scottish official public record
- The London Gazette or The Gazette, all-UK official public record
- Teesside Gazette, formerly Evening Gazette, Teesside, England

=== United States ===
- Green Bay Press-Gazette, Green Bay, Wisconsin
- Hammonton Gazette, Hammonton, New Jersey
- The Gazette (Colorado Springs), Colorado Springs, Colorado
- The Gazette (Chicago), Chicago, Illinois
- The Gazette (Cedar Rapids), Cedar Rapids, Iowa
- The Gazette (Maryland), the common name of a group of community newspapers in Maryland
- Maryland Gazette, known as The Gazette, founded in 1727 as The Maryland Gazette; one of the oldest newspapers in America
- The New York Gazette, a fictional newspaper in Rex Stout's Nero Wolfe mysteries
- St. Joseph Gazette, St. Joseph, Missouri
- Pennsylvania Gazette, Philadelphia, Pennsylvania, published by Benjamin Franklin in the 18th century
- Pittsburgh Post-Gazette, Pittsburgh, Pennsylvania
- Texarkana Gazette, Texarkana, Texas
- Hardwick Gazette, Hardwick, Vermont: see Hardwick, Vermont#Media
- The Gazette (Virginia), Galax, Virginia
- The Charleston Gazette, Charleston, West Virginia
- Kalamazoo Gazette, Kalamazoo, Michigan
- The Gazette, a weekly newspaper for the Library of Congress library staff

== French-language newspapers ==
- La Gazette, a weekly magazine published in France from 1631 to 1915
- La Gazette de Berlin, newspaper for the French-speaking community in Germany
