= Grayson County News Gazette =

Weekly newspaper in Leitchfield, Kentucky, United States

- Type: Semi-daily newspaper
- Owner: Paxton Media Group
- Publisher: Tim Kiger
- Founded: 1890
- Language: English
- Headquarters: Leitchfield, Kentucky, US
- Website: www.gcnewsgazette.com

Grayson County News Gazette is a weekly newspaper published on Saturdays. It is based in Leitchfield, Kentucky.

The paper was previously owned by Heartland Publications. In 2012 Versa Capital Management merged Heartland, Ohio Community Media, former Freedom papers it had acquired, and Impressions Media into a new company, Civitas Media. Civitas Media sold the News Gazette to Paxton Media Group in 2017.
