= The Chapel Hill Herald =

Coordinates: 35.974923°N 78.958761°W

- Type: Daily newspaper
- Owner: Paxton Media Group
- Publisher: Richard J. Kaspar
- Founded: 1988
- Headquarters: 2828 Pickett Road, Durham, North Carolina 27705
- City: Durham
- Country: United States
- OCLC number: 27702593
- Website: chapelhillherald.com

The Chapel Hill Herald is an American, English language daily newspaper headquartered in Durham, Orange County, North Carolina.

== History ==
The newspaper was founded in 1988. In December 2004, Paxton Media Group purchased The Durham Herald Co., the parent company of The Chapel Hill Herald.

In 2007, it was rumored Paxton was going to close the paper. A manager confirmed that there was an ongoing discussion, but said talk of the paper's demise was "premature."

== See also ==
- List of newspapers in North Carolina
