= Graham Star =

The Graham Star
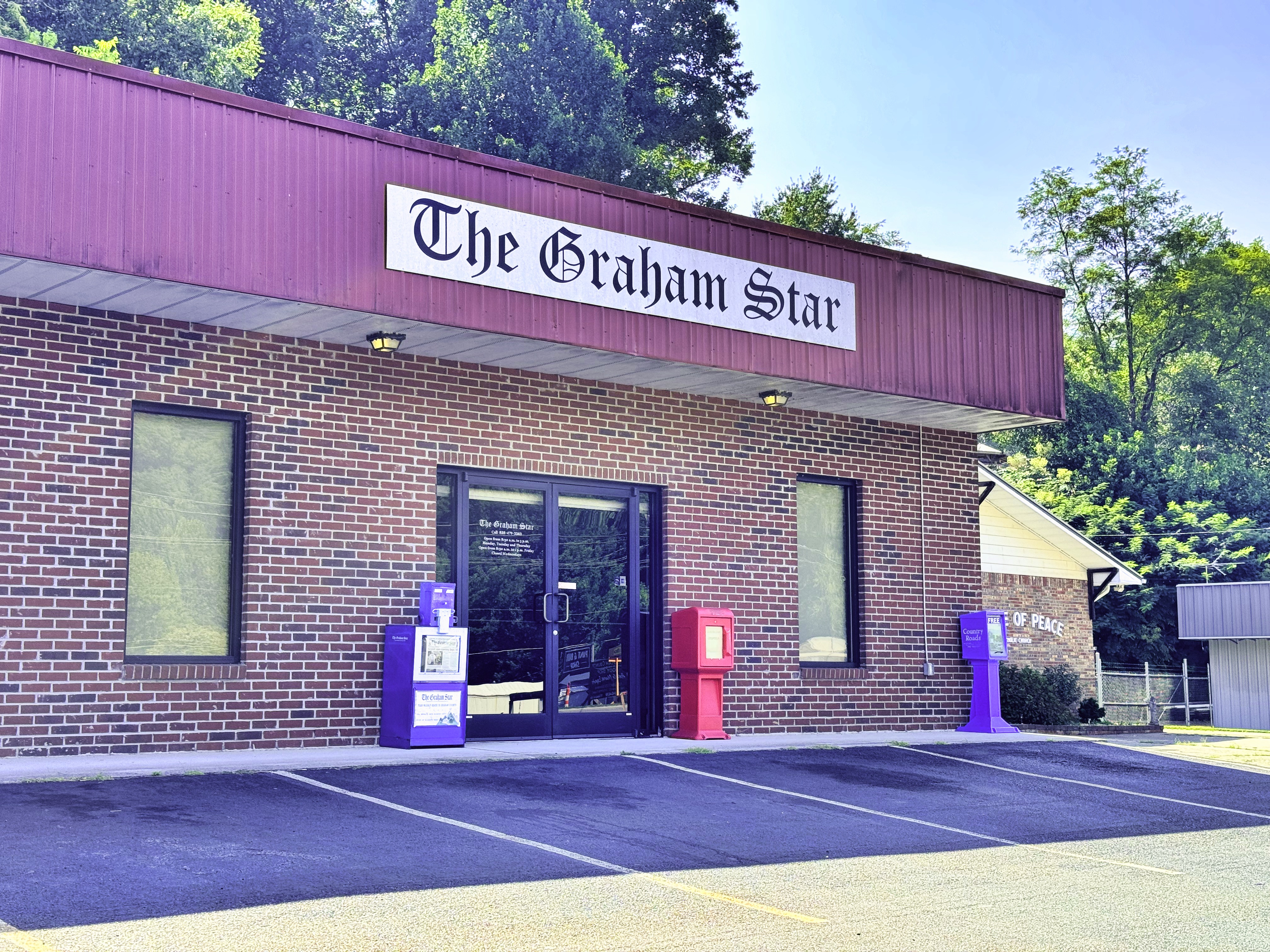
- Type: Weekly newspaper
- Owner: Paxton Media Group
- Publisher: Rachel Hoskins
- Editor: Kevin Hensley
- Founded: 1955
- Language: English
- Headquarters: 720 Tallulah Road, Robbinsville, North Carolina United States
- Circulation: 2,500
- Website: grahamstar.com

The Graham Star is a weekly newspaper based in Robbinsville, North Carolina covering Graham County, North Carolina.

The newspaper was founded in 1955 and is distributed each Thursday. In 2026, Community Newspapers Inc. sold the Star and eight other papers to Paxton Media Group. Paxton appointed a regional publisher to oversee the Star and seven other newspapers.
