= Charles A. Finley =

Florida State Representative

Charles Alexander Martin Finley (April 22, 1849 – May 22, 1934) was an American emeritus secretary of the Florida Senate and state representative as well as a newspaper publisher, printer for the state of Florida, an academic administrator, and the secretary to Florida’s 15th governor Francis P. Fleming.

Finley served as the secretary of the Florida Senate for two terms; from 1887 to 1895, and 1905 to 1929. He also was an academic administrator at Florida Agricultural College (a predecessor of the University of Florida).

== Early life and family ==
Charles Alexander Martin Finley was born on April 22, 1849, in Marianna, Florida, the son of General Jesse Johnson Finley. He had one sister.

Finley was married to Arabel (née Moncrief) in 1872; and together they had seven children, two sons and five daughters.

== Career ==
Finley served as the publisher of the Lake City Reporter daily newspaper, from 1875 until 1889.

He served as an administrator at Florida Agricultural College around 1901 and 1902. In 1901, he swore to an affidavit against Johnson Kirby, a college employee accused of murder.

In 1879 he served in the Florida House of Representatives representing Columbia County as a Democrat.

He was elected as Secretary to the Florida Senate in 1887 a position he held until 1895, when he was succeeded by T. J. Appleyard. Finley regained the position as secretary to the Florida Senate in 1905 and held until 1929.

He was photographed with the members of the Florida legislature in 1889, and with the Florida Senate in 1915. He was a witness for Democrats regarding election issues in Lake City, Florida.

Finley died on May 22, 1934, at his daughters home in Graceville, Florida, after a long illness, within a few hours of the death of his friend and fellow state senate employee, bill clerk Ben Hill Simmons. Finely was buried at Marvin Chapel Cemetery in Graceville, Florida.
