= Clay County Progress =

Weekly newspaper in Hayesville, North Carolina

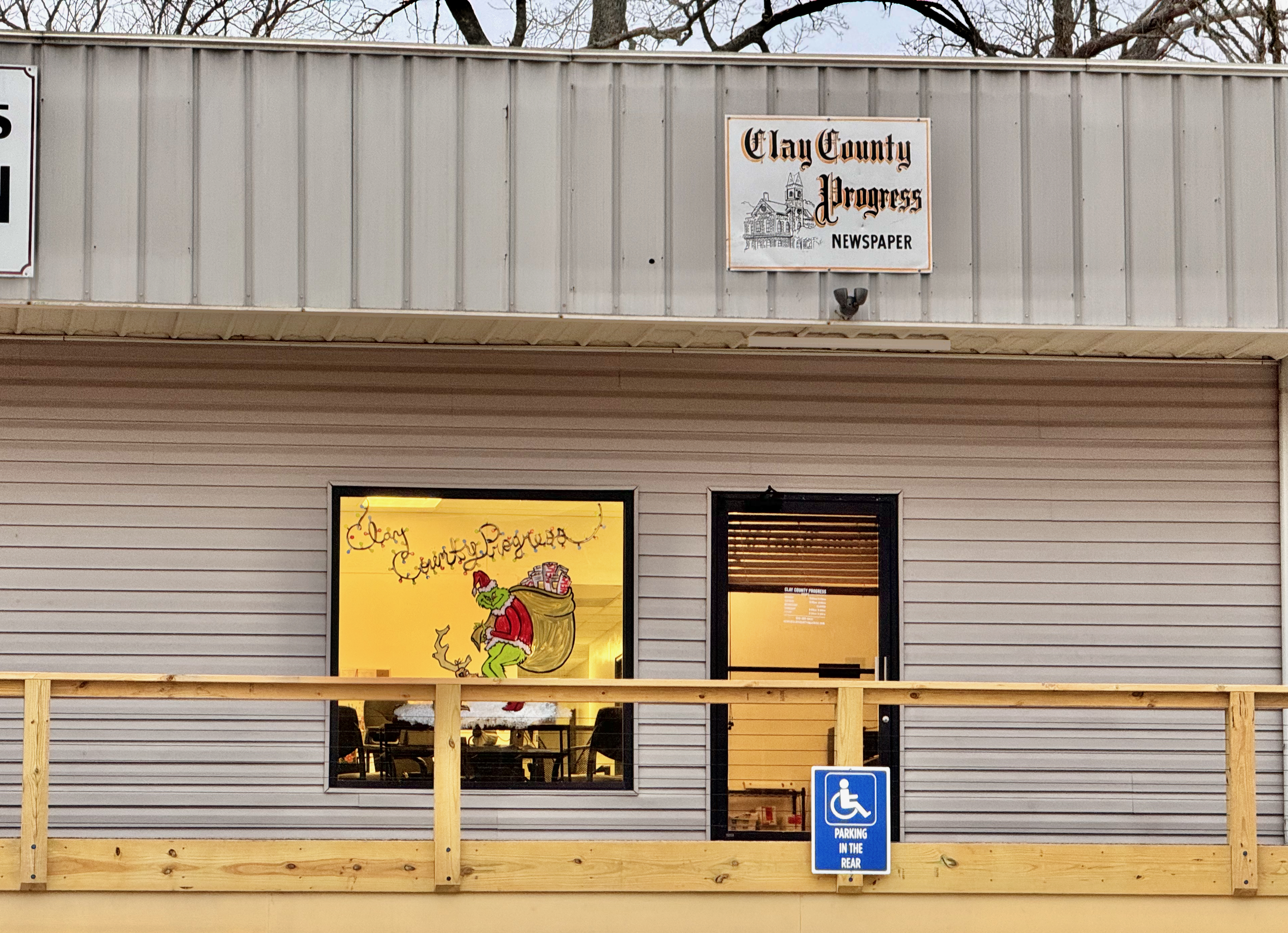
- The Clay County Progress newspaper office in Hayesville, N.C.
- Type: Weekly newspaper
- Format: Broadsheet
- Owner: Paxton Media Group
- Publisher: Rachel Hoskins
- Founded: November 1951
- Language: English
- Headquarters: Hayesville, NC, 28904; United States
- Circulation: 4,600
- ISSN: 2994-3914
- OCLC number: 31885516
- Website: claycountyprogress.com

Clay County Progress is a weekly newspaper in Hayesville, North Carolina, and Clay County. It covers Clay and Cherokee counties in North Carolina and Towns County, Georgia.

== History ==
The Clay County Progress was preceded by two other newspapers. The Clay County Courier launched in 1902 and operated through at least 1909. It was published by G.W. Sanderson and edited by G.H. Haigler. The Clay County News launched Sep. 17, 1926. James Andrew Gray began publishing it with his wife as associate editor. Subsequent editors included Alvin Penland (1937–1938), Eula Gray (1938–1939), and Lucille Padgett (1939–1942). L. E. Hollifield Jr., bought the newspaper in March 1942 and then sold publishing rights to Cross Printing Co., of Clayton, Georgia, by October 1942. At that time L. P. Cross took over duties as editor and the paper was printed in Clayton. The Clay County News stopped printing in 1943, only to be briefly revived by Rev. L. P. Smith, Guy Padgett and Hattie Jarrett in 1947 before closing for good the following year.

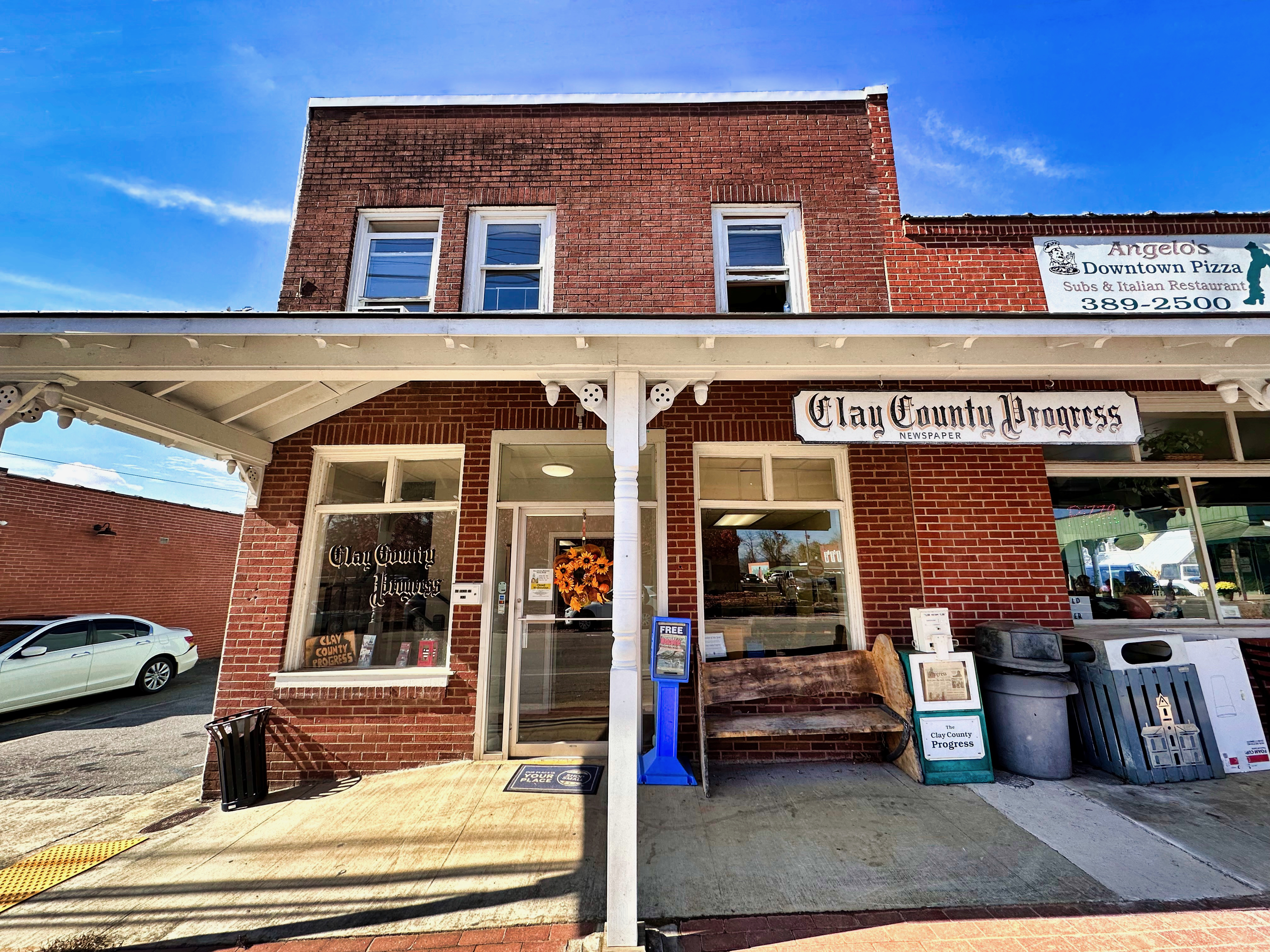
The newspaper office in downtown Hayesville from 2003 until 2023

In November 1951, Rev. J. K. Hutchings, pastor of a Baptist church in Hiawassee, Georgia, and publisher of the Towns County Herald, started the Clay County Progress. Publishing rights were sold to The Cherokee Scout in nearby Murphy in 1961 and the Scout printed a combined Cherokee Scout and Clay County Progress edition between 1961 and 1980. The Progress has been printed on the Scout's press ever since.

The Progress has twice faced competition. In 1975, the Mountain News opened an office in Hayesville. It is uncertain how long the paper printed locally. Between 1987 and January 2012, weekly newspaper The Smoky Mountain Sentinel operated out of Hayesville. The Sentinel had a circulation of 4,000 when it shut down due to the publisher falling ill. Since it closed, the Progress has been the only newspaper in Clay County.

In the 1980s, The Progress was headquartered on the town square at 57 Main Street before moving to Moore's Plaza on Business Highway 64. In 2003, the newspaper moved to a brick building on the square at 43 Main Street. In October 2023, the paper returned to Moore's Plaza but did not explain why it moved.

The Progress has sponsored Clay County's annual Christmas parade since its inception in 1987. The newspaper's website, ClayCountyProgress.com, launched by February 2002. The Progress began publishing "Reader's Choice" awards in 2022. In September 2025, the Progress office was the target of a break-in. File cabinets were rifled through and cash was stolen. A suspect was not apprehended.

In 2026, Community Newspapers Inc. sold the Progress and eight other papers to Paxton Media Group. Shortly after the sale, four of the newspaper's nine staff members (three reporters and the paper's longest-serving publisher, Becky Long) departed on the same day. The four who retired had cumulatively spent more than 100 years working for the paper. The new owners eliminated Long's position and appointed a regional publisher to oversee eight newspapers in her place.

== Publishers ==
1. J. K. Hutchings (1951–1952)
2. Paul G. Cutright (1952–1953)
3. Lucille Padgett (1953–1954)
4. Gene Robinson (1954–1957)
5. Denzle Whitehair (1957–1961)
6. Cherokee Scout (1961–1980)
7. Fran Fuller (–1986)
8. Faith Hall (1986–1987)
9. Lonnie Britt (1987–)
10. Becky Long (1992–2026)
11. Rachel Hoskins (2026–present)

== See also ==
- List of newspapers published in North Carolina
