= The Paducah Sun =

Newspaper published in Paducah

- Type: Daily newspaper
- Owner: Paxton Media Group
- Founded: 1896
- Headquarters: 408 Kentucky Avenue Paducah, KY 42003
- Website: paducahsun.com

The Paducah Sun is a daily newspaper in Paducah, Kentucky, owned by the family-run Paxton Media Group. The paper was formerly known as the Paducah Sun-Democrat. The publisher is Bill Evans. Johnny Blazina is the general manager.

The Sun is the most-read newspaper in Kentucky's Jackson Purchase region. The newspaper's combined online and print subscriptions total 24,768 on weekdays, 23,455 on Saturdays, and 26,833 on Sundays, according to the Audit Bureau of Circulation's last official audit, taken on March 31, 2008.

== History ==
According to the Historic Downtown Paducah special section of the Sun published June 28, 2002, the newspaper traces it roots to 1896, when a group of investors headed by Frank M. Fisher launched The Evening Sun by buying the assets of the failing Paducah Standard at 214 Broadway. The cost was $8,900, and the men started with $10,000 capital. The newspaper did not make a profit until 1918. In 1929, Paxton's son, Edwin J. Paxton, who had taken over as editor, bought out the rival News-Democrat. After the merger, the newspaper became The Sun-Democrat, and operations were moved to the current location at 408 Kentucky Avenue in 1934. The name changed to The Paducah Sun in 1978 at the request of Jack Paxton, editor at the time and grandson of Edwin J. Paxton.

In April 2008, The Paducah Sun printed the first newspapers on its new press. Completed in December 2007, the new building is a $10.7 million facility in downtown Paducah. It is a 26,000-square-foot (2,400 m^{2}) high-tech production building housing the new press with the entire southwest wall made of glass. The paper prints around midnight and is viewable to passersby.

== Operation ==
The Paducah Sun, the flagship newspaper of Paxton Media Group, serves western Kentucky, northwestern Tennessee, and southern Illinois, providing the most complete local news and sports coverage for the 17-county region. The Sun also offers additional publications, such as the quarterly Posh magazine, and monthly editions of House Call and the Four Rivers Business Journal, to meet the eclectic tastes and interests of its readers.

== Controversy ==
On November 14, 2003, Paducah Sun Editor and Publisher Jim Paxton, then 48, was arrested in Nashville, Tennessee, and charged with driving under the influence of alcohol, possession of a handgun while under the influence, unlawful possession of a weapon and having an open alcoholic-beverage container. These records can be found in the office of the Criminal Court Clerk of Metropolitan Nashville and Davidson County. The Paducah Sun also ran stories about the arrest. Jim Paxton was forced by the Paxton Media Group to take an indefinite leave of absence from his work. He subsequently pleaded guilty to all charges.
