= Gazette (news) =

Australian news network

- Type: Online
- Founder: Anna Saulwick
- Publisher: Anna Saulwick
- Managing editor: Brad Esposito
- Founded: 15 October 2024; 2 years ago
- Headquarters: North Sydney, New South Wales, Australia
- Website: www.gazettenews.au

Gazette is a network of news websites operating in Australia that was founded in October 2024. Their full company name is the Gazette News Operating Company. Their websites publish news content tailored to specific regions including the North Coast of New South Wales — titled The Mid North Coaster, the North Shore of New South Wales — titled The North Shore Lorikeet, Eastern Melbourne — titled The Eastern Melburnian, the Gippsland area of Victoria — titled The Gippsland Monitor, Western Victoria — titled The West Vic Brolga and a national media outlet — titled The National Account.

== Funding ==
Crikey and The Sydney Morning Herald have reported that the network's three main sources of funding are linked to Climate 200 (a group that funds teal independent campaigns) and includes Matthew Doran, James Taylor and Mark Rawson, Rawson does not donate to Climate 200 however.

== Reception ==
In March 2025, prior to that year's election, the website was accused of campaigning in favour of teal independent candidates by Liberal senator Jane Hume. National party leader David Littleproud has also criticised the network. Later that month, they were cleared of wrongdoing by the Australian Electoral Commission. Country Press Australia has also criticised the network for its sources of funding.
