= Charles P. Findley =

American politician

Charles P. Findley was a state representative Bibb County, Alabama in 1853. He also served as a justice of the peace.
