= The High Point Enterprise =

Newspaper in High Point, North Carolina, US

- Type: Daily newspaper
- Format: Broadsheet
- Owner: Paxton Media Group
- Publisher: Rick Thomason
- Editor: Guy Lucas
- Founded: 1885
- Language: American English
- Headquarters: 213 Woodbine St. High Point, North Carolina 27260 United States
- City: High Point
- Country: United States
- Circulation: 19,483 during the week and 22,467 on Sunday (as of 2008)
- Sister newspapers: Thomasville Times; Archdale-Trinity News
- OCLC number: 26963687
- Website: www.hpenews.com

The High Point Enterprise is an American English-language daily morning newspaper that primarily serves High Point, North Carolina. The newspaper's coverage area includes parts of Guilford, Davidson, Randolph and Forsyth counties in the Piedmont Triad area of North Carolina. The Enterprise is owned by Paxton Media Group. The paper was founded in 1885 and is a member of the North Carolina Press Association.

== History ==
The Enterprise was founded as a weekly newspaper in November 1885. In 1888 Charles Farriss purchased the paper. Soon after, he left the paper in the hands of his brother J.J. Farriss, a former editor of The Biblical Recorder, the newspaper of the North Carolina Baptist Convention. On September 9, 1904, the paper became a daily.

In 1919, the paper was bought by J. P. Rawley (1886-1937) and R. B. Terry (1883-1955), and it remained in the Rawley and Terry families for eight decades.

The newspaper moved to 210 Church Ave. in 1970. It moved in August 2014 from that location to its current home at 213 Woodbine St., a facility that allows space for a new printing press.

=== Recent history ===
On October 3, 1994, the paper shifted from afternoon publication to mornings.

In 1999, the Rawley family sold its stake of the newspaper company, which also included The Thomasville Times, The Archdale-Trinity News and the Triad Business News, to Paxton Media.

Longtime publisher Randall B. Terry Jr. held onto his half of the company. The relationship between Terry and Paxton was testy. In 2000, Terry accused Paxton of trying to cut local content. Paxton sued Terry, alleging mismanagement.

In June 2001, the paper cut 16.5 positions, including eight full-time jobs and two part-time jobs from the main newspaper.

Terry died of cancer in May 2004. Soon after, Paxton bought the remaining shares of the newspaper. Rick Bean became publisher in May 2004. Upon assumption of operations, Paxton fired Gary B. Moore, general manager, and laid off 20 employees after it closed ESP, a weekly entertainment newspaper.

The paper underwent a redesign in 2005. More layoffs took place at the Enterprise in 2007.

In early 2008, Bean became publisher of the Herald-Sun in Durham, and, in May 2008, Mike Starn became publisher of the Enterprise. On Feb. 9, 2009, Paxton Media Group officials informed High Point Enterprise employees that printing and related business would be handled by the Durham Herald-Sun in Durham, N.C., effective March 2. Effective February 2011, Jodi Brookshire became publisher of the Enterprise. In October 2012, Rick Bean returned to serve as both publisher of the Enterprise and Herald-Sun.

In August 2014, the Enterprise resumed printing operations at its facilities. At its new location, 213 Woodbine St., the Enterprise also prints the Herald-Sun in Durham, as well as other Paxton papers from Sanford, Henderson and Monroe. In August 2015 the High Point Enterprise Launched a new website allowing the integration of Facebook commenting and better ad locations.

In April 2016 The Enterprise started HPE: High Point Talks a podcast under information Technology manager Allison Temple and Editor Megan Ward. The channel featuring their staff in interviews, story and discussionary type shows and hopes to move the paper further into newer technology. HPEdigital.com

In December 2019, citing analysis of advertising revenue and single-copy sales, the Enterprise announced that it was dropping its Monday edition, shifting to a Tuesday-Sunday publishing cycle.

== Newspaper alumni ==
- Capus Waynick, United States ambassador to Nicaragua and Colombia in President Harry Truman's administration, and a campaign manager for North Carolina Governor W. Kerr Scott, was Enterprise editor from 1923 to 1931 and from 1937 to 1941.

== See also ==
- List of newspapers in North Carolina
