= Smoky Mountain Times =

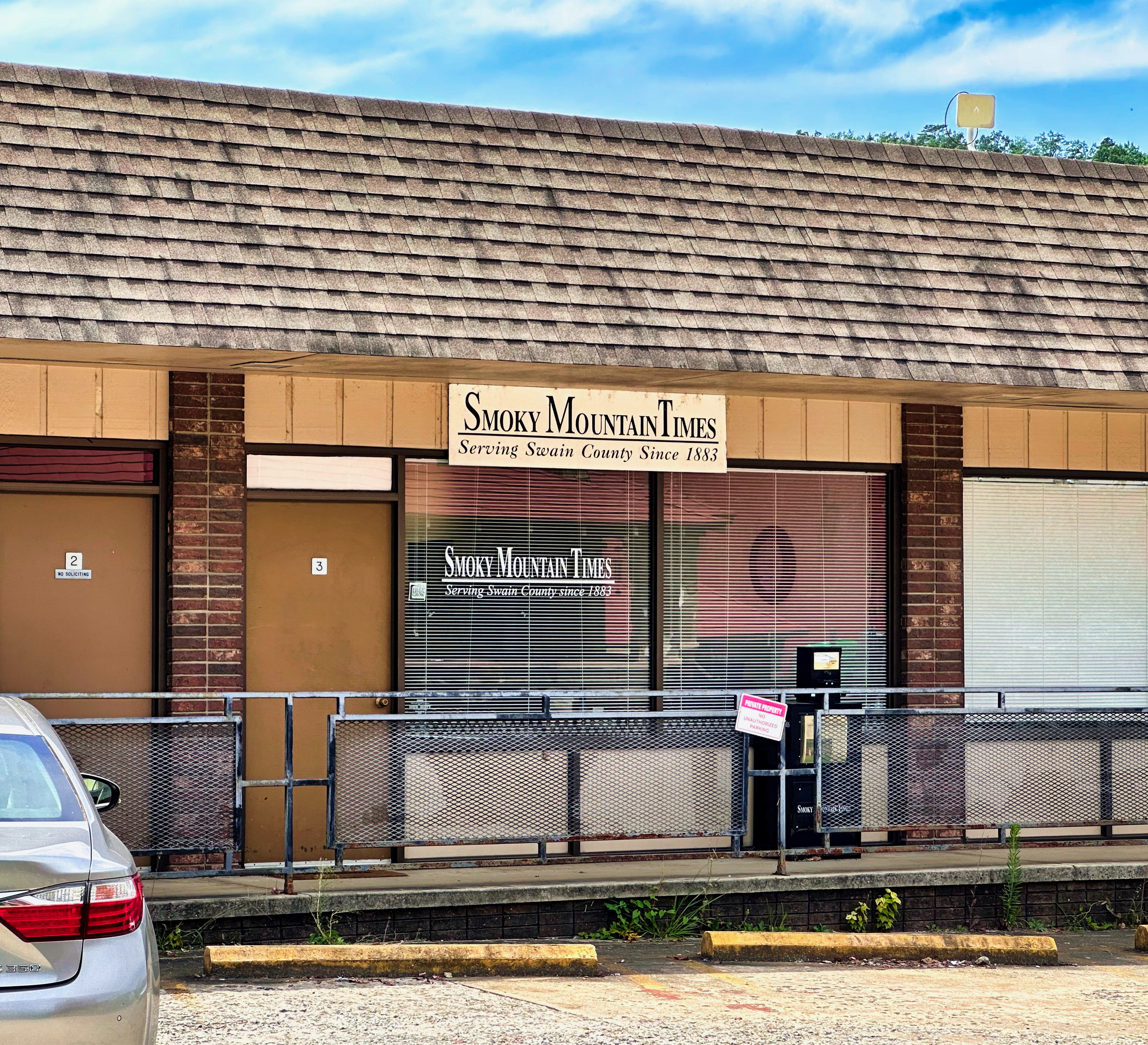
- The Smoky Mountain Times newspaper office in Bryson City
- Type: Weekly newspaper
- Owner: Paxton Media Group
- Publisher: Rachel Hoskins
- News editor: Jessica Webb
- Founded: 1883
- Language: English
- Website: thesmokymountaintimes.com

Smoky Mountain Times is a weekly newspaper based in Bryson City, North Carolina. It is published on Thursdays and has served the people of Swain County, North Carolina since 1883. In 2026, Community Newspapers Inc. sold the Times and eight other papers to Paxton Media Group. Paxton appointed a regional publisher to oversee the Times and seven other newspapers.
