= Paxton Media Group =

American newspaper company

Paxton Media Group, LLC
- Type: Private
- Industry: Media
- Founded: 1896
- Headquarters: Paducah, Kentucky, United States
- Key people: David M. Paxton (President & CEO)
- Products: Newspapers, Media
- Owner: Paxton family
- Website: paxtonmedia.com

Paxton Media Group of Paducah, Kentucky, is a privately held media company with holdings that include newspapers and a TV station, WPSD-TV in Paducah. David M. Paxton is president and CEO.

The company owns 32 daily newspapers and numerous weekly newspapers, mostly in the southern United States. Daily circulation totals 350,000. Holdings include The Paducah Sun, the High Point Enterprise in High Point, North Carolina, the Jonesboro Sun in Jonesboro, Arkansas, and the Daily Star in Hammond, Louisiana and The Daily Citizen in Searcy, Arkansas.

== History ==
Paxton Media Group traces it roots to 1896, when a group of investors headed by William F. Paxton launched The Evening Sun by buying the assets of the failing Paducah Standard at 214 Broadway. The cost was $8,900, and the men started with $10,000 capital. The newspaper did not make a profit until 1918. In 1929, Paxton's son, Edwin J. Paxton, who had taken over as editor, bought out the rival News-Democrat. After the merger, the newspaper became The Sun-Democrat, and operations were moved to the subsequent location at 408 Kentucky Avenue in 1934. The name changed to The Paducah Sun in 1978 at the request of Jack Paxton, editor at the time and grandson of Edwin J. Paxton.

At 4:20 p.m. May 28, 1957, WPSD-TV (the PSD stands for Paducah Sun-Democrat) went on air as the company-owned television station based in Paducah. It is an NBC affiliate. The company operated only The Paducah Sun and WPSD-TV until 1989, when it began acquiring other newspapers.

In 1998, the company purchased Nixon Newspapers Inc., which included the Wabash Plain Dealer in Indiana.

In October 2000, Paxton purchased The Herald-Palladium from Hollinger Inc.

In December 2004, Paxton Media Group purchased The Durham Herald Co., the parent company of The Herald-Sun and The Chapel Hill Herald.

In 2007, Paxton Media Group purchased three Indiana newspapers: the Marion Chronicle-Tribune (in July) from the Gannett Foundation; the Huntington Herald-Press (in May) from the Quayle family; and the La Porte Herald-Argus from Small Newspaper Group (in September).

In June 2015, Paxton purchased the Mayfield Messenger in Kentucky. In May 2016, Paxton purchased The Elkhart Truth in Indiana. In late December 2016, Paxton sold The Herald-Sun to The McClatchy Company.

In 2017, Paxton acquired the Grayson County News Gazette, the News Democrat Leader, and the Macon County Times from Civitas Media. In January 2018, Paxton purchased the Daily Herald in Roanoke Rapids, North Carolina, from Wick Communications. In June 2018, it purchased The Batesville Daily Guard in Arkansas from the Jones family. In November 2018, Paxton purchased the Kentucky New Era. In May 2019, it purchased The Rochester Sentinel in Indiana. By June 2019, Paxton acquired four additional Arkansas newspapers, including Conway's Log Cabin Democrat, Clinton's Van Buren County Democrat, The Sun-Times in Heber Springs, and the Newport Independent.

In July 2020, Paxton purchased the Dubois County Herald in Jasper, Indiana. In October 2020, Paxton purchased the Wilkes Journal-Patriot in North Carolina.

In February 2021, Paxton acquired the North Vernon Plain Dealer & Sun in Indiana.

In May 2021, Paxton purchased Landmark Community Newspapers, publisher of 47 daily and weekly newspapers in Florida, Indiana, Iowa, Kentucky, New Mexico, North Carolina, Ohio, South Carolina and Virginia. (This sale includes the Casey County News, and the Central Kentucky News-Journal) It later resold some publications acquired in the Landmark purchase that it considered outside the company's footprint: The Las Vegas Optic in New Mexico to O'Rourke Media Group; Huskers Illustrated to Nicholas Holdings; and two newspapers in Iowa, the Red Oak Express and the Glenwood Opinion-Tribune, to J. Louis Mullen.

In November 2022 Paxton acquired six North Carolina newspapers from Gannett Co., Inc. The additions include the Lexington Dispatch, the Asheboro Courier-Tribune, the Burlington Times-News, the Kinston Free Press, the New Bern Sun Journal, and The Daily News of Jacksonville.

In October 2023, Paxton acquired The Southern Illinoisan from Lee Enterprises.

In May 2024, the company acquired the Kernersville News. In June that same year, Paxton acquired The Brazil Times, Greencastle Banner-Graphic, Greene County Daily World and Dyersburg State Gazette from Rust Communications.

In March 2025, Paxton purchased the Southern Standard and Smithville Review from Morris Multimedia. In September 2025, Paxton acquired The Niles Daily Star, Dowagiac Daily News and The Leader from Boone Newsmedia. That same month, the company bought 15 newspapers in Illinois and Missouri from Better Newspapers, Inc.

In March 2026, Paxton purchased nine newspapers in North Carolina and Georgia from Community Newspapers Inc. In October 2026, Paxton acquired Louisiana State Newspapers.

== Business practices ==
=== Durham Herald-Sun ===
Paxton Media Group was criticized when it fired nearly 25 percent of the employees of The Herald-Sun, many of them longtime staples of the newsroom, the day it assumed ownership. Paxton defended the move by claiming that the newsroom was overstaffed and the salaries were causing the Durham, North Carolina paper to post annual losses. According to the Durham-based Independent Weekly, sources familiar with the Herald-Sun, Co.'s accounting ledgers, the company was operating profitably at least 6 months prior to Paxton's $124 million purchase.

Allegations of lackluster and biased reporting by Paxton Media Group's holdings became news, again, with the dismissal of charges against the suspects in the Duke lacrosse rape case, when it became clear that The Herald-Sun editorial policy would not permit the paper to publish criticism of Durham district attorney Mike Nifong, despite the fact that Nifong was facing ethics charges by the North Carolina State Bar and demands by the North Carolina Conference of District Attorneys that Nifong remove himself from the case. In December 2016, Paxton Media sold The Herald-Sun to The McClatchy Company, owner of a competitor newspaper, The News & Observer of Raleigh, North Carolina.

=== La Porte Herald-Argus ===
In September 2007, Paxton purchased the La Porte County Herald-Dispatch amidst rumors that the paper would either be moved, merged, or have its staff severely cut, due to the recent acquisition of a number of rural newspapers in northern Indiana. In order to allay those rumors, then-publisher John A. Newby wrote a column that firmly stated that the Herald-Argus was profitable and "lean" and therefore would not see any dramatic changes. Despite published claims to the contrary, in October, shortly after taking over operation of the paper, Paxton Media laid off about half its staff at the Herald-Argus and moved its production location to that of the Paxton-owned Herald-Palladium in St. Joseph, Michigan, which by Paxton's own admission, has negatively impacted the paper's ability to publish timely local news. Reminiscent of the abrupt manner in which the Herald-Sun firings were conducted, at least one longtime Herald-Argus staffer was notified of her termination via certified mail while she recovered from surgery at home. The remaining Herald-Argus staffers and the staffers at other nearby Paxton-owned papers were specifically instructed not to publish information regarding the Herald-Argus staff cuts and production changes. The Herald-Argus' website has also removed the September 17, 2007 column which promised that there would be no staff cuts or relocation of the paper's offices under Paxton's watch.

In July 2008, Paxton consolidated operations even more, making the publisher, managing editor, and other editorial management the same for both papers.

=== High Point Enterprise ===
On November 15, 2007, reports indicate that Paxton dramatically cut the staff of the High Point Enterprise in High Point, North Carolina, which Paxton took control of in 2004. This is the third round of layoffs since 1999, when Paxton first purchased a stake in the paper. Senior Enterprise staff frequently criticized Paxton's management of the paper, arguing that there was a quantifiable reduction in local coverage.

=== The Southern Illinoisan ===
In October 2023, Lee Enterprises sold the newspaper to Paxton Media Group. Lee Enterprises' sale of The Southern Illinoisan was delayed after pushback from the newspapers union guild. The guild contested the sale after learning that Paxton would not be retaining any of the guild employees once the sale was final. The sale was completed on Monday, Dec. 11, 2023 and all employees who were formerly working at the newspaper were laid off.

== Properties ==
=== Newspapers ===
==== Daily ====
- The Batesville Daily Guard - Batesville, Arkansas
- The Chapel Hill Herald - Durham, North Carolina
- The Courier - Russellville, Arkansas
- The Daily Citizen - Searcy, Arkansas
- The Jonesboro Sun - Jonesboro, Arkansas
- Paragould Daily Press - Paragould, Arkansas
- Citrus County Chronicle - Crystal River, Florida
- Douglas County Sentinel - Douglasville, Georgia
- Griffin Daily News - Griffin, Georgia
- Times-Georgian - Carrollton, Georgia
- Connersville News-Examiner - Connersville, Indiana
- The Courier-Times - New Castle, Indiana
- The News-Dispatch - Michigan City, Indiana
- Indiana Plain Dealer - Peru, Indiana
- Princeton Daily Clarion - Princeton, Indiana
- The Rochester Sentinel - Rochester, Indiana
- The Shelbyville News - Shelbyville, Indiana
- The Times - Frankfort, Indiana
- Vincennes Sun-Commercial - Vincennes, Indiana
- The Chronicle-Tribune - Marion, Indiana
- La Porte County Herald-Dispatch - LaPorte County, Indiana
- The Elkhart Truth - Elkhart, Indiana
- The News-Enterprise - Elizabethtown, Kentucky
- Kentucky New Era - Hopkinsville, Kentucky
- The Messenger - Madisonville, Kentucky
- Mayfield Messenger - Mayfield, Kentucky
- Messenger-Inquirer - Owensboro, Kentucky
- The Paducah Sun - Paducah, Kentucky
- Daily Star - Hammond, Louisiana
- The Herald-Palladium - St. Joseph, Michigan
- Daily Journal - Park Hills, Missouri
- Daily Corinthian - Corinth, Mississippi
- The Courier-Tribune - Asheboro, North Carolina
- Times-News - Burlington, North Carolina
- The Daily Courier - Forest City, North Carolina
- The Goldsboro News-Argus - Goldsboro, North Carolina
- The Daily Dispatch - Henderson, North Carolina
- High Point Enterprise - High Point, North Carolina
- Jacksonville Daily News - Jacksonville, North Carolina
- Kinston Free Press - Kinston, North Carolina
- News-Topic - Lenoir, North Carolina
- The Dispatch - Lexington, North Carolina
- The Enquirer-Journal - Monroe, North Carolina
- Sun Journal - New Bern, North Carolina
- The Daily Herald - Roanoke Rapids, North Carolina
- The Sanford Herald - Sanford, North Carolina
- The Mountain Press - Sevierville, Tennessee
- Log Cabin Democrat - Conway, Arkansas
- The Grand Haven Tribune - Grand Haven, Michigan
- The Lebanon Democrat - Lebanon, Tennessee
- The Cleveland Daily Banner - Cleveland, Tennessee
- The Southern Illinoisan - Carbondale, Illinois

==== Weekly ====
- Van Buren County Democrat - Clinton, Arkansas
- The Sun-Times - Heber Springs, Arkansas
- Newport Independent - Newport, Arkansas
- The Blue Ridge News Observer - Blue Ridge, Georgia
- The Haralson Gateway-Beacon - Bremen, Georgia
- Ellijay Times-Courier - Ellijay, Georgia
- The Tallapoosa Journal - Tallapoosa, Georgia
- The Villa-Rican - Villa Rica, Georgia
- Mount Carmel Register - Mount Carmel, Illinois
- The Metropolis Planet - Metropolis, Illinois
- The Standard - Boonville, Indiana
- Marshall County Tribune-Courier - Benton, Kentucky
- The Cadiz Record - Trigg County, Kentucky
- McLean County News - Calhoun, Kentucky
- Franklin Favorite - Franklin, Kentucky
- Herald-Ledger - Eddyville, Kentucky
- Progress - Dawson Springs, Kentucky
- Journal Enterprise - Providence, Kentucky
- Grayson County News Gazette - Leitchfield, Kentucky
- News-Democrat & Leader - Russellville, Kentucky
- The South Haven Tribune - South Haven, Michigan
- Archdale-Trinity News - Archdale, North Carolina
- Smoky Mountain Times - Bryson City, North Carolina
- The Franklin Press - Franklin, North Carolina
- Clay County Progress - Hayesville, North Carolina
- The Highlands Highlander - Highlands, North Carolina
- Indian Trail Trader - Indian Trail, North Carolina
- Kernersville News - Kernersville, North Carolina
- News-Topic - Lenoir, North Carolina
- Cherokee Scout - Murphy, North Carolina
- Wilkes Journal-Patriot - North Wilkesboro, North Carolina
- The Graham Star - Robbinsville, North Carolina
- Mitchell News-Journal - Spruce Pine, North Carolina
- Thomasville Times - Thomasville, North Carolina
- Waxhaw Exchange - Waxhaw, North Carolina
- Macon County Times - Lafayette, Tennessee
- Portland Leader - Portland, Tennessee
- The Lebanon Enterprise - Lebanon, Kentucky
- The Corydon Democrat - Corydon, Indiana
- Clarion News - Corydon, Indiana
- The Pioneer News - Shepherdsville, Kentucky
- The Kentucky Standard - Bardstown, Kentucky
- The Springfield Sun - Springfield, Kentucky
- The Central Kentucky News-Journal - Campbellsville, Kentucky
- The Roane County News - Kingston, Tennessee
- The Casey County News - Liberty, Kentucky

=== Other ===
- WPSD-TV - Paducah, Kentucky
- Sun Publishing - Paducah, Kentucky
- WFKN - Franklin, Kentucky
- Corydon Instant Print - Corydon, Indiana
