= List of newspapers in Alabama =

This is a list of newspapers in Alabama, United States. The first title was produced in 1811, and "by 1850, there were 82 newspapers in Alabama, of which nine were dailies."

== Daily and nondaily newspapers (currently published) ==
The following are daily, weekly, semi-weekly, etc., newspapers published in Alabama:

| Name | Locale | Year Est. | Frequency | Publisher/parent company | Notes |
|---|---|---|---|---|---|
| Advertiser-Gleam | Guntersville | | Weekly | | |
| Alabama Baptist | Birmingham | 1843 | Weekly | | |
| Alabama Messenger | Birmingham | | | | (Website) |
| Alabama Times | Birmingham | | | | |
| Alexander City Outlook | Alexander City | 1892 | Bi-Weekly | Tallapoosa Publishers | |
| Andalusia Star News | Andalusia | | Daily | | |
| Anniston Star | Anniston | 1912 | Daily | | |
| Atmore Advance | Atmore | | Daily | | |
| Auburn Villager | Auburn | 2006 | Weekly | | |
| Baldwin Times | Bay Minette | | Weekly | | |
| Birmingham Business Journal | Birmingham | | Weekly | | |
| Birmingham News | Birmingham | 1888 | Tri-Weekly | Alabama Media Group / Advance Publications | Alabama Media Group is shifting to an all-digital format on February 27, 2023 and will no longer publish legal ads, public notices, bid notices, completion notices, classified ads, etc.. |
| Birmingham Times | Birmingham | | Weekly | | |
| Brewton Standard | Brewton | | Daily | | |
| Call News | Citronelle | 1897 | Weekly | Willie T. Gray / Gray & Gray Inc. | |
| Cherokee County Herald | Centre | | Weekly | | |
| Chilton County News | Clanton | | Weekly | | |
| The Citizen of East Alabama | Phenix City | 1957 | Weekly | R.M. Greene | |
| Clanton Advertiser | Clanton | | Daily | | |
| Clark County Democrat | Grove Hill | 1856 | Weekly | Jim Cox | |
| Cleburne News | Heflin | | Weekly | | |
| Courier Journal | Florence | | Weekly | | |
| Cullman Times | Cullman | | Daily | Community Newspaper Holdings, Inc. | |
| Cullman Tribune | Cullman | 1874 | Daily | | Oldest continuously published weekly newspaper in Alabama. Cullman County's oldest business. {Website} |
| Daily Home | Talladega | | Daily | | |
| Daily Mountain Eagle | Jasper | | Daily | | |
| Daily Sentinel | Scottsboro | | Daily | | |
| Daleville Sun-Courier | Daleville | 1897 | Weekly | Talllapoosa Publishers | |
| Daphne-Spanish Fort Bulletin | Daphne | | Weekly | | |
| Decatur Daily | Decatur | | Daily | | |
| Dekalb Advertiser | Fort Payne | | Weekly | | |
| Democrat-Reporter | Linden | 1911 | Weekly | Goodloe Sutton | |
| Demopolis Times | Demopolis | | Daily | | |
| Dothan Eagle | Dothan | | Daily | Berkshire Hathaway Inc. | |
| Elberta-Lillian Ledger | Elberta | | Weekly | | |
| Enterprise Ledger | Enterprise | | Daily | | |
| Eufaula Tribune | Eufaula | | Weekly | | |
| Fairhope Courier | Fairhope | | Weekly | | |
| Foley Onlooker | Foley | | Weekly | | |
| Franklin County Times | Russellville | | Weekly | | |
| Gadsden Times | Gadsden | | Daily | GateHouse Media | |
| Greenville Advocate | Greenville | | Weekly | | |
| Huntsville Times | Huntsville | 1910 | Tri-Weekly | Alabama Media Group / Advance Publications | Alabama Media Group is shifting to an all-digital format on February 27, 2023 and will no longer publish legal ads, public notices, bid notices, completion notices, classified ads, etc.. |
| Independent | Robertsdale | | Weekly | | |
| Islander | Gulf Shores | | Weekly | | |
| Jacksonville News | Jacksonville | | Weekly | | |
| Lagniappe | Mobile | | Weekly | | |
| Lamar Democrat | Vernon | 1896 | | | |
| Latino News | Birmingham | | Weekly | | Statewide, based in Birmingham |
| Lowndes Signal | Fort Deposit | | Weekly | | |
| Luverne Journal | Luverne | | Weekly | | |
| Millbrook Independent | Millbrook | | Weekly | | |
| Mobile Beacon & Alabama Citizen | Mobile | | Weekly | | |
| Monroe Journal | Monroeville | 1866 | Weekly | | |
| Montgomery Advertiser | Montgomery | 1829 | Daily | USA Today Co. | |
| Montgomery Independent | Montgomery | | Weekly | | |
| News Courier | Athens | | Daily | Community Newspaper Holdings, Inc. | |
| North Jefferson News | Gardendale | | Weekly | Community Newspaper Holdings, Inc. | |
| Northport Gazette | Northport | | Weekly | | |
| Opelika-Auburn News | Opelika | | Daily | Berkshire Hathaway Inc. | |
| Opelika Observer | Opelika | | Weekly | | |
| Pickens County Herald | Carrollton | | Weekly | | |
| Piedmont Journal | Piedmont | | Weekly | | |
| Post | Centre | | Weekly | | |
| Press-Register | Mobile | 1821 | Tri-Weekly | Alabama Media Group / Advance Publications | Began as Mobile Commercial Register in 1821, became Press-Register in 1932 Alabama Media Group is shifting to an all-digital format on February 27, 2023 and will no longer publish legal ads, public notices, bid notices, completion notices, classified ads, etc.. |
| St. Clair Times | Pell City | | Weekly | | |
| Sand Mountain Reporter | Albertville | | Daily | | |
| Selma Sun | Selma | | Weekly | Cindy Fisher | |
| Selma Times-Journal | Selma | | Daily | | |
| Shelby County Reporter | Columbiana | | Weekly | | |
| South Alabamian | Jackson | | Weekly | Jim Cox | |
| Southeast Sun | Enterprise | | Weekly | | |
| Southern Star | Ozark | | Daily | | |
| Sumter Circular | York | | Weekly | | |
| Sumter County Record-Journal | Livingston | | Weekly | | |
| The Tallassee Tribune | Tallassee | 1919 | Weekly | Boone Newspapers | |
| Talk Of Semmes | Semmes | | Weekly | | |
| Thomasville Times | Thomasville | | Weekly | Jim Cox | |
| The Times | Montgomery | 1923 | Weekly | | |
| Times-Journal | Fort Payne | | Daily | | |
| Times-Record | Fayette | | Weekly | | |
| TimesDaily | Florence | | Daily | | |
| Troy Messenger | Troy | | Daily | | |
| Trussville Tribune | Trussville | 2005 | Weekly | Scott Buttram / Principle Publishing Group | |
| Tuscaloosa News | Tuscaloosa | | Daily | GateHouse Media | |
| Tuskegee News | Tuskegeea | 1865 | Weekly | | |
| Valley Times-News | Lanett | | Daily | | |
| Washington County News | Chatom | | Weekly | Willie T. Gray / Gray & Gray Inc. | (Website) |
| Western Star | Bessemer | | Weekly | | |
| Wetumpka Herald | Wetumpka | | Weekly | Tallapoosa Publishers, Inc. | |

== University newspapers ==
- The Auburn Plainsman – Auburn University
- The Crimson White – University of Alabama, Tuscaloosa
- The Kaleidoscope – University of Alabama at Birmingham
- The Vanguard-The University of South Alabama
- The Springhillian - Spring Hill College
- The Chanticleer - Jacksonville State University
- The Crimson – Samford University
- The Tropolitan - Troy University

== Defunct ==
| Title | Locale | Year est. | Notes |
|---|---|---|---|
| Advertiser | Moulton | 1828 | |
| Advocate | Huntsville | 1815 | Ceased in 1893 |
| Alabama Courier | Claiborne | 1819 | Published by Tucker & Turner and ceased operations sometime in the 1820s |
| Alabama Journal, Alabama State Journal | Montgomery | began 1869 | Bought by Gannett; see Montgomery Advertiser |
| Alabama Observer | | | |
| Alabama Republican | Huntsville | 1816 | |
| Alabama Time-Piece | Aldrich | 1895 | 1902 |
| American Star | Sheffield | | |
| Baptist Leader | Birmingham | | |
| Birmingham Iron Age | Birmingham | 1874 | |
| Birmingham Post-Herald | Birmingham | | Ceased in 2005 |
| Cahawba Press and Alabama Intelligencer | | 1819 | |
| Geneva County Reaper | Geneva | 1901 | Ceased in 2024 |
| Daily Rebel | Selma | 1865 | |
| Halcyon | St. Stephens | 1814 | |
| Hoover Gazette | Hoover | 2006 | 2007 |
| Huntsville News | Huntsville | 1964 | Ceased in 1996 |
| Meteor | Tuscaloosa | 1872 | |
| Mobile Centinel | Fort Stoddert | 1811 | |
| Mobile Gazette | | 1813 | |
| The Mobile Morning News | Mobile | 1865 | |
| The North Jefferson News | Gardendale | 1970 | Ceased in 2020 |
| Mobile News Item | Mobile | 1910 | Ceased about 1944 |
| Pike County News | | | |
| Republican | Montgomery | 1821 | |
| Republican | Tuscaloosa | 1819 | |
| Southern Courier | Montgomery | 1964 | |
| Times-Plain Dealer | Birmingham | | |
| Weekly Post | Rainsville | | |

== See also ==
- Alabama media
  - List of radio stations in Alabama
  - List of television stations in Alabama
  - List of African American newspapers in Alabama
  - Media in cities in Alabama: Birmingham, Huntsville, Mobile, Montgomery, Tuscaloosa
- Journalism:
  - Category:Journalists from Alabama
  - University of Alabama College of Communication and Information Sciences in Tuscaloosa
- Alabama literature
U.S. newspapers

Comprehensive

- Lists of newspapers
- List of newspapers in the United States

Frequency

- List of free daily newspapers in the United States
- List of weekly newspapers in the United States

Circulation

- List of international newspapers originating in the United States
- List of national newspapers in the United States
- List of newspapers in the United States by circulation

Foreign language

- List of French-language newspapers published in the United States
- List of German-language newspapers published in the United States
- List of Spanish-language newspapers published in the United States

Specialty

- List of African-American newspapers in the United States
- List of alternative weekly newspapers in the United States
- List of business newspapers in the United States
- List of family-owned newspapers in the United States
- List of Jewish newspapers in the United States
- List of LGBTQ periodicals in the United States
- List of student newspapers in the United States
- List of supermarket tabloids in the United States
- List of underground press in the United States

Other

- List of defunct newspapers of the United States

== Bibliography ==
- Saffold Berney (1878), "Newspapers in Alabama", Handbook of Alabama, Mobile: Mobile Register print.
- S. N. D. North; United States Department of the Interior (1884). "Catalogue of Periodical Publications: Alabama". History and Present Condition of the Newspaper and Periodical Press of the United States. Washington, D.C.: Government Printing Office. OCLC 1850475. (+ List of titles 50+ years old)
- James T. Haley, ed. (1895), "Newspapers: Alabama", Afro-American Encyclopaedia, Mind and matter, Nashville: Haley & Florida, hdl:2027/inu.30000029292855, OCLC 219597043
- "Alabama". American Newspaper Directory. New York: George P. Rowell. 1900. hdl:2027/umn.31951002273861a.
- "Newspaper Industry". Alabama Hand Book: Agricultural and Industrial Resources and Opportunities. Montgomery: Alabama Department of Agriculture and Industries. 1919.
- "Alabama". American Newspaper Annual & Directory. Philadelphia: N. W. Ayer & Son. 1922. pp. 33+. hdl:2027/umn.31951001295695n.
- Federal Writers' Project (1941), "Newspapers and Radio", Alabama; a Guide to the Deep South, American Guide Series, New York: Hastings House, pp. 110–115, hdl:2027/uc1.b4469723 – via HathiTrust
- Rhoda Coleman Ellison (1946). "Newspaper Publishing in Frontier Alabama". Journalism & Mass Communication Quarterly. 23.
- Thomas D. Clark (1948). Southern Country Editor. Bobbs-Merrill. OCLC 525858. (Includes information about weekly rural newspapers in Alabama)
- Rhoda Coleman Ellison. History and Bibliography of Alabama Newspapers in the Nineteenth Century. Tuscaloosa: University of Alabama Press, 1954.
- James Boylan (1963). "Birmingham: newspapers in a crisis". Columbia Journalism Review. 2.
- Daniel Savage Gray (1975). "Frontier Journalism: Newspapers in Antebellum Alabama". Alabama Historical Quarterly. 37.
- Allen W. Jones (1984). "Voices for Improving Rural Life: Alabama's Black Agricultural Press, 1890-1965". Agricultural History. 58 (3): 209–220. JSTOR 3743075.
- King E. Williams Jr. (1997). The Press of Alabama: A History of the Alabama Press Association. Alabama Press Assoc. ISBN 1878561545.
- Lynda Brown; et al. (1998). Alabama History: an Annotated Bibliography. Greenwood Press. ISBN 978-0-313-28223-2. (Includes information about Alabama newspapers)
