= List of newspapers in Louisiana =

This is a list of newspapers in Louisiana.

== Daily and weekly newspapers (currently published) ==
Title	Locale	Year est.	Publisher/parent company	Notes
Abbeville Meridional	Abbeville		Louisiana State Newspapers	
The Town Talk	Alexandria		USA Today Co.	
The Basile Weekly	Basile		Louisiana State Newspapers	
The Advocate	Baton Rouge	1908	Georges Media Group	
Plaquemines Gazette	Belle Chasse			
The Bernice Banner News	Bernice		Jessie Kelley Boyett	
Bogalusa Daily News	Bogalusa	1927	Boone Newspapers	
Bossier Press-Tribune	Bossier City		Specht Newspapers	
The Inquisitor	Bossier City	1997	Settle Talk LLC	
St. Charles Herald-Guide	Boutte	1993	Louisiana Publishing Inc.	
The Bunkie Record	Bunkie		Louisiana State Newspapers	
St. Bernard Voice	Chalmette			
The Church Point News	Church Point		Louisiana State Newspapers	
The Chronicle	Colfax			
The Caldwell Watchman	Columbia		Louisiana State Newspapers	
The Crowley Post-Signal	Crowley		Louisiana State Newspapers	
The Delhi Dispatch	Delhi		Louisiana State Newspapers	
The Cameron Parish Pilot	DeQuincy		Wise family	
The DeQuincy News	DeQuincy		Wise family	
Beauregard Daily News	DeRidder		Boone Newspapers	
Donaldsonville Chief	Donaldsonville		USA Today Co.	
The Eunice News	Eunice		Louisiana State Newspapers	
The Gazette	Farmerville			
Concordia Sentinel	Ferriday		Hanna Publishing	
St. Mary and Franklin Banner-Tribune	Franklin		Louisiana State Newspapers	
Franklinton Era-Leader	Franklinton			
Gonzales Weekly Citizen	Gonzales		USA Today Co.	
Gueydan Journal	Gueydan		Louisiana State Newspapers	
Daily Star	Hammond		Paxton Media Group	
The Courier	Houma		USA Today Co.	
The Jena Times	Jena	1905		
The Kaplan Herald	Kaplan		Louisiana State Newspapers	
The Kinder Courier News	Kinder		Louisiana State Newspapers	
The Daily Advertiser	Lafayette	1865	USA Today Co.	
The Acadiana Advocate	Lafayette		Georges Media Group	
American Press	Lake Charles		Boone Newspapers	
L'Observateur	LaPlace		Boone Newspapers	
Leesville Daily Leader	Leesville		Boone Newspapers	
Acadian Press	Mamou		Louisiana State Newspapers	
Avoyelles Journal	Marksville		Louisiana State Newspapers	
The Marksville Weekly News	Marksville		Louisiana State Newspapers	
Minden Press-Herald	Minden		Specht Newspapers	
Monroe Free Press	Monroe	1969	Wright's Publishing, Co.	
The News-Star	Monroe		USA Today Co.	
Morgan City Review	Morgan City		Louisiana State Newspapers	
Natchitoches Times	Natchitoches	1903	NTN Media	
The Daily Iberian	New Iberia		Carpenter Media Group	
The Times-Picayune | The New Orleans Advocate	New Orleans	1837	Georges Media Group	Began as Picayune in 1837; merged with Times-Democrat in 1914 to form Times-Picayune, merged with New Orleans edition of The Advocate in 2019
The Pointe Coupee Banner	New Roads	1880	LaCour family	
The West Carroll Gazette	Oak Grove		Louisiana State Newspapers	
The Oakdale Journal	Oakdale		Louisiana State Newspapers	
Daily World	Opelousas		USA Today Co.	
The Bayou-Pioneer	Pierre Part		Louisiana State Newspapers	
Post South	Plaquemine		USA Today Co.	
The Rayne Acadian-Tribune	Rayne		Louisiana State Newspapers	
The Richland Beacon-News	Richland		Louisiana State Newspapers	
Ruston Daily Leader	Ruston		Ruston Newspapers, Inc.	
The Tensas Gazette	St. Joseph		Louisiana State Newspapers	
Teche News	St. Martinville		Louisiana State Newspapers	
The Times	Shreveport	1871	USA Today Co.	
Southwest Daily News	Sulphur		Boone Newspapers	
The Madison Journal	Tallulah		Emmerich Newspapers	
The Daily Comet	Thibodaux		USA Today Co.	
Ville Platte Gazette	Ville Platte		Louisiana State Newspapers	
The Ouachita Citizen	West Monroe		Hanna Publishing	
The Franklin Sun	Winnsboro		Hanna Publishing	

== University newspapers ==
- Louisiana State University – The Daily Reveille
- Louisiana Tech University – The Tech Talk
- McNeese State University – The Contraband
- Northwestern State University - The Current Sauce
- Tulane University – The Hullabaloo
- University of Louisiana at Lafayette – The Vermilion
- Xavier University of Louisiana – The Xavier Herald
- Southeastern Louisiana University - The Lion’s Roar
- Southern University - The Southern Digest
- Grambling State University - The Gramblinite

== Defunct newspapers ==
Title	Locale	Year est.	Year ceased	Notes
Avoyelles Pelican	Marksville	1859	186?	
Bastrop Daily Enterprise	Bastrop	1904	2019	
Baton-Rouge Gazette		1819	1856	
Baton Rouge State-Times		1904	1991	
Bogalusa Enterprise		1914	1918	
Daily States	New Orleans	1880		Became New Orleans States-Item in 1960
Gazette and Sentinel	Plaquemine	1858	1864	
Houma Courier		1878	1939	
The Independent	Lafayette	2003	2017	
Lafayette Advertiser		1865	19??	
Louisiana Cotton-Boll	Lafayette	1872	1883	
Le Louisianais	Convent	1865	1883	
Lower Coast Gazette	Pointe à la Hache	1909	1925	
The Lumberjack	Alexandria	1913	1913	
The Meridional	Abbeville	1856	1906	
Le Meschacébé	Lucy	1853	1942	
Le Messager	Bringier	1846	1860	
Natchitoches Union		1859	1864	
New Orleans Bee	New Orleans	1827	1923	Also called Abeille de la Nouvelle Orleans
New Orleans Republican	New Orleans	1867	1878	
North Ouachita Weekly	Sterlington		2019	
Courrier de la Louisiane		1807	1860	
The Louisianan		1870	1871	
New Iberia Enterprise		1885	1902	
New Orleans Item-Tribune	New Orleans	1924	1958	Began as Daily City Item in 1877
L'Abeille (The New Orleans Bee)	New Orleans	1827	1923	
New-Orleans Commercial Bulletin	New Orleans	1832	1871	
New Orleans States-Item	New Orleans	1958	1980	
The New Orleans Tribune	New Orleans	1864	1870	
Opelousas Courier	Opelousas	1852	1910	
Opelousas Journal	Opelousas	1868	1878	
Opelousas Patriot	Opelousas	1855	1863	
El Pelayo	New Orleans	1851	1852	
Pioneer of Assumption	Napoleonville	185?	1895	
Planters' Banner	Franklin	1849	1872	
Pointe Coupee Democrat	New Roads	1858	1862	
River Parishes Guide	Boutte	1969	1993	
La Sentinelle de Thibodaux		1861	1866	
The Shreveport Journal	Shreveport	1897	1991	
St. Charles Herald	Hahnville	1873	1993	
St. Landry Clarion	Opelousas	1890	1921	
The Voice of the People	New Orleans	1913	19??	
Weekly Louisianian	New Orleans	1872	1882	

== See also ==
- Louisiana media
  - List of radio stations in Louisiana
  - List of television stations in Louisiana
  - Media of locales in Louisiana: Baton Rouge, Lafayette, Monroe, New Orleans, Shreveport, Terrebonne Parish
- Category:Journalists from Louisiana
- Literature of Louisiana
- List of French-language newspapers published in the United States
U.S. newspapers

Comprehensive

- Lists of newspapers
- List of newspapers in the United States

Frequency

- List of free daily newspapers in the United States
- List of weekly newspapers in the United States

Circulation

- List of international newspapers originating in the United States
- List of national newspapers in the United States
- List of newspapers in the United States by circulation

Foreign language

- List of French-language newspapers published in the United States
- List of German-language newspapers published in the United States
- List of Spanish-language newspapers published in the United States

Specialty

- List of African-American newspapers in the United States
- List of alternative weekly newspapers in the United States
- List of business newspapers in the United States
- List of family-owned newspapers in the United States
- List of Jewish newspapers in the United States
- List of LGBTQ periodicals in the United States
- List of student newspapers in the United States
- List of supermarket tabloids in the United States
- List of underground press in the United States

Other

- List of defunct newspapers of the United States

== Bibliography ==
- "List of Newspapers and Periodicals Printed Wholly or in Part in Languages Other Than English: French: Louisiana", Geo. P. Rowell and Co.'s American Newspaper Directory, New York: Geo. P. Rowell & Co., 1880
- S. N. D. North; United States Department of the Interior (1884). "Catalogue of Periodical Publications: Louisiana". History and Present Condition of the Newspaper and Periodical Press of the United States. Washington, D.C.: Government Printing Office. OCLC 1850475.
- James T. Haley, ed. (1895), "Newspapers: Louisiana", Afro-American Encyclopaedia, Nashville: Haley & Florida, hdl:2027/inu.30000029292855, OCLC 219597043
- "Louisiana". American Newspaper Directory. New York: George P. Rowell. 1900. pp. 377+. hdl:2027/umn.31951002273861a.
- "Louisiana". American Newspaper Annual & Directory. Philadelphia: N. W. Ayer & Son. 1922. pp. 385+. hdl:2027/umn.31951001295695n.
- John S. Kendall (1929). "Foreign Language Press of New Orleans". Louisiana Historical Quarterly. 12.
- Edward Larocque Tinker (1932), "Bibliography of the French newspapers and periodicals of Louisiana" (PDF), Proceedings of the American Antiquarian Society, vol. 42 (Issue also includes other lists related to Louisiana newspapers)
- Federal Writers' Project (1941), "Newspapers and Radio", Louisiana: a Guide to the State, American Guide Series, NY: Hastings House, pp. 134–140, hdl:2027/uc1.$b727648 – via HathiTrust
- Works Progress Administration (1941). Louisiana newspapers, 1794-1940: a union list of Louisiana newspaper files available in offices of publishers, libraries, and private collections in Louisiana. Louisiana State University – via HathiTrust.
- John S. Kendall (1946). "New Orleans Newspapermen of Yesterday". Louisiana Historical Quarterly. 29.
- Edward Larocque Tinker (1951), "Two-Gun Journalism in New Orleans" (PDF), Proceedings of the American Antiquarian Society, vol. 61
- Raymond R. MacCurdy (1954). "Tentative Bibliography of the Spanish-Language Press in Louisiana, 1808-1871". The Americas. 10 (3). Academy of American Franciscan History: 307–329. doi:10.2307/977937. JSTOR 977937.
- G. Thomas Tanselle (1971). "General Studies: Louisiana". Guide to the Study of United States Imprints. Harvard University Press. p. 848+. ISBN 978-0-674-36761-6. (Includes information about newspapers)
