= Daily News =

Daily News or The Daily News is the name of several daily newspapers around the world, including:

== Australia ==
- Daily News (Brisbane), (1878–1879), successor to the Queensland Patriot
- Daily News (Perth), (1882–1990) Western Australian afternoon paper
- Daily News (Sydney) (1938–1940), formerly Labor Daily, then merged into The Daily Telegraph (Sydney)
- Tweed Daily News, New South Wales (online only)
- Warwick Daily News, Queensland (online only)

== Bahrain ==
- Gulf Daily News

== Botswana ==
- Daily News Botswana

== Canada ==
- Ming Pao Daily News (Canada)
- Dawson Creek Daily News, British Columbia
- The Kamloops Daily News, British Columbia
- Nanaimo Daily News, British Columbia
- Nelson Daily News (1902–2010), British Columbia
- Prince Rupert Daily News (1911–2010), British Columbia
- The Daily News (Halifax), Nova Scotia
- The Daily News (1955–1963), a newspaper St. John's, Newfoundland and Labrador
- Today Daily News (Toronto), Ontario
- Truro Daily News, Nova Scotia
- Montreal Daily News (1988–1989), Quebec

== Egypt ==
- Daily News Egypt

== Guam ==
- Pacific Daily News, Hagåtña

== India ==
- Daily News and Analysis

== Ireland ==
- Daily News (Ireland), a short-lived paper of 1982

== Malaysia ==
- Berita Harian (Malaysia) (Daily News)
- Oriental Daily News (Malaysia)
- Overseas Chinese Daily News
- See Hua Daily News

== New Zealand ==
- Taranaki Daily News, New Plymouth

== People's Republic of China ==
- Macao Daily News
- North China Daily News (1850–1941), Shanghai
- Oriental Daily News, Hong Kong
- Sing Pao Daily News, Hong Kong
- Tin Tin Daily News (1960–2000), Hong Kong

== Republic of China ==
- China Daily News (Taiwan)
- Central Daily News
- Kinmen Daily News
- Mandarin Daily News
- United Daily News

== Poland ==
- Dziennik Związkowy (Polish Daily News)

== Romania ==
- Bucharest Daily News

== Singapore ==
- Berita Harian (Singapore)
- Shin Min Daily News

== South Africa ==
- Daily News (Durban)

== Sri Lanka ==
- Daily News (Sri Lanka)

== Tanzania ==
- Daily News (Tanzania)

== Thailand ==
- Daily News (Thailand)

== Turkey ==
- Hürriyet Daily News

== United Kingdom ==
- Birmingham Daily News
- The Daily News (UK) (1846–1930), merged to form the News Chronicle
- London Daily News (February–July 1987)
- Scottish Daily News (1975–1975)

== United States ==
=== Multiple states ===
- Daily News Record (1892–2008), American fashion trade journal
- International Daily News, sold in several major Chinatowns

=== Alaska ===
- Anchorage Daily News
- Fairbanks Daily News-Miner
- Ketchikan Daily News

=== Arizona ===
- Mohave Valley Daily News, Bullhead City
- Tempe Daily News

=== California ===
- Burlingame Daily News
- Daily News – Antelope Valley, Palmdale
- The Daily News (Palo Alto)
- Daily News (Red Bluff)
- The Daily News (San Francisco)
- East Bay Daily News, Berkeley
- Los Angeles Daily News (1981–present)
- Los Angeles Daily News (historic) (1923–1954), originally the Los Angeles Illustrated Daily News
- Los Gatos Daily News
- Nguoi Viet Daily News, Westminster
- Redwood City Daily News (2000–2009)
- San Mateo Daily News (2000–2009)
- Siskiyou Daily News, Yreka
- Vien Dong Daily News Westminster
- Whittier Daily News

=== Colorado ===
- Aspen Daily News
- Denver Daily News (2001–2011)

=== Connecticut ===
- Yale Daily News, Yale University, New Haven

=== District of Columbia ===
- The Washington Daily News

=== Florida ===
- Naples Daily News
- Northwest Florida Daily News, Fort Walton Beach
- Palatka Daily News
- Palm Beach Daily News

=== Georgia ===
- LaGrange Daily News

=== Idaho ===
- Moscow-Pullman Daily News

=== Illinois ===
- Chicago Daily News
- Effingham Daily News

=== Indiana ===
- The Ball State Daily News, Muncie
- Greensburg Daily News

=== Iowa ===
- Newton Daily News

=== Kansas ===
- Hays Daily News
- The Wellington Daily News

=== Kentucky ===
- The Daily News (Kentucky) Bowling Green
- Middlesboro Daily News

=== Louisiana ===
- Beauregard Daily News
- Bogalusa Daily News
- Southwest Daily News, Sulphur

=== Maine ===
- Bangor Daily News

=== Massachusetts ===
- Athol Daily News
- The Daily News of Newburyport
- The Daily News Transcript, Norwood
- The Daily News Tribune, Waltham
- The MetroWest Daily News, Framingham
- The Milford Daily News

=== Michigan ===
- Hillsdale Daily News
- Midland Daily News
- The Daily News, Iron Mountain

=== Minnesota ===
- Daily News (Wahpeton)
- Mesabi Daily News, Virginia
- Winona Daily News

=== Missouri ===
- Boonville Daily News
- The Neosho Daily News
- The Rolla Daily News

=== Montana ===
- Havre Daily News

=== Nebraska ===
- Norfolk Daily News

=== New Mexico ===
- Alamogordo Daily News

=== New York ===
- New York Daily News
- New York Daily News (19th century) (1855–1906)
- The Daily News (Batavia)

=== North Carolina ===
- Daily News (Eden)
- Jacksonville Daily News
- Washington Daily News

=== North Dakota ===
- Minot Daily News
- Daily News (Wahpeton)

=== Ohio ===
- Dayton Daily News
- Sidney Daily News
- Troy Daily News

=== Oklahoma ===
- Anadarko Daily News
- Elk City Daily News
- Weatherford Daily News

=== Pennsylvania ===
- The Daily News (McKeesport)
- Lebanon Daily News
- Philadelphia Daily News

=== Rhode Island ===
- The Newport Daily News

=== Tennessee ===
- The Daily News Journal, Murfreesboro
- Daily News (Kingsport)
- The Daily News (Memphis)

=== Texas ===
- The Daily News (Texas), Galveston
- The Lufkin Daily News
- Focus Daily News
- Henderson Daily News

=== Washington ===
- The Daily News (Longview, Washington)
- Peninsula Daily News, Port Angeles

=== West Virginia ===
- Mineral Daily News-Tribune, Keyser
- West Virginia Daily News, Lewisburg
- Williamson Daily News

=== Wisconsin ===
- Beloit Daily News
- Rhinelander Daily News

== United States Virgin Islands ==
- The Virgin Islands Daily News

== Zimbabwe ==
- Daily News (Harare)
- Zimbabwe Daily News
