= Washington Daily News =

Daily newspaper

- Type: Daily newspaper
- Owner: Boone Newspapers
- Publisher: Ashley Vansant
- News editor: Vail Stewart Rumley
- Founded: 1909
- Language: American English
- Headquarters: 217 N. Market St. Washington, North Carolina 27889
- Circulation: 8,644 Daily; 8,829 Sunday
- ISSN: 1057-7068
- OCLC number: 990784684
- Website: thewashingtondailynews.com

The Washington Daily News is an American, English-language daily newspaper headquartered in and serving Washington, North Carolina and Beaufort County, North Carolina.

== History ==
The newspaper was established in 1909. The paper also uses Facebook for sharing news and interacting with readers.

The paper won the 1990 Pulitzer Prize for Public Service for a series of articles that showed the city's water was contaminated and had been for eight years. The newspaper was then family-owned. It had a circulation of 8,644 Monday through Saturday and 8,829 on Sunday as of Sept. 30, 2019. The newspaper was owned and published by the Futrell family from 1949 until 2010.

On June 16, 2010, the Futrell family announced the sale of the Washington Daily News to Washington Newsmedia LLC, a new company affiliated Boone Newspapers, Inc. of Tuscaloosa, Alabama. Boone Newspapers also owns the Tryon Daily Bulletin, The Stanley News and Press, the Salisbury Post, The Coastland Times, The Roanoke-Chowan News-Herald, The Davie County Enterprise-Record and the Clemmons Courier.

== See also ==
- List of newspapers in North Carolina
