= Enterprise-Record =

Enterprise-Record may refer to:

- Chico Enterprise-Record, a daily newspaper of Chico, California
- The Davie County Enterprise-Record, a weekly newspaper serving Davie County, North Carolina
