= Anadarko =

Anadarko may refer to:

== Places ==
- Anadarko, Oklahoma, a city
- Anadarko Basin, a geologic basin in western Oklahoma and the Texas Panhandle, extending west

== Other uses ==
- Anadarko Daily News, a newspaper in Caddo County, Oklahoma
- Anadarko Independent School District, a school district
- Anadarko Petroleum, a defunct company that engaged in hydrocarbon exploration
- Nadaco, a Caddo tribe from eastern Texas, commonly referred to as the Anadarko

== See also ==
- Amma Darko (born 1956), African novelist
- Grace Hanadarko, the fictional protagonist of Saving Grace
