= Le Petit Journal (website) =

French-language news website

lepetitjournal.com
- Screenshot
- Website type: Online Newspaper
- Available in: French
- Owner: lepetitjournal.com sarl
- Creator: Hervé Heyraud
- Website: lepetitjournal.com
- Commercial: Yes
- Launched: 2001
- Current status: Active

lepetitjournal.com is a daily French language news website aimed at French expatriates and Francophones outside France. It was launched in 2001 by Hervé Heyraud, and has won several awards.

== Awards ==
- Prix Michel Colonna d'Istria – GESTE (2005),
- Prix de la Culture nationale de Catalunya (Barcelona, 2008)
- Prix Franco-allemand du journalisme - catégorie Internet (édition Allemagne, 2009

== See also ==
- Le Courrier de Floride, a Miami-based French-language newspaper
