= Le Messager (Maine) =

French Newspaper

- Le Plus Grand Quotidien de Langue Française aux États-Unis (French) "The Largest French Language Daily in the United States"

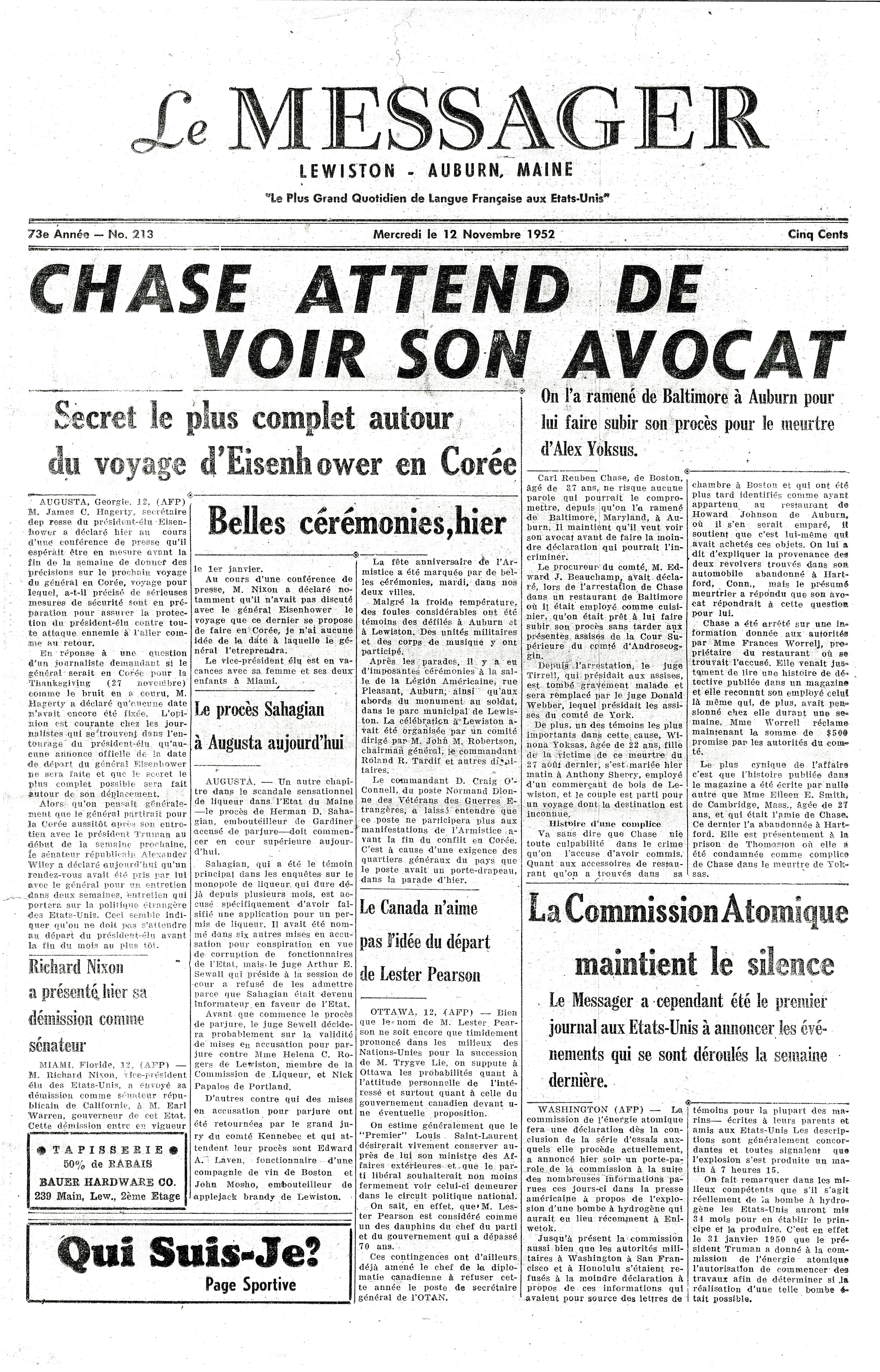
- Type: Weekly newspaper
- Format: Broadsheet
- Founded: 1880
- Ceased publication: 1966
- Language: French (New England French)
- Headquarters: 223 Lisbon Street, Lewiston, Maine 04240 United States
- OCLC number: 9449358

Le Messager was a French language newspaper, founded in 1880 in Lewiston, Maine. It serving the sizeable Franco-American (Franco-Canadian) population in that city. Le Messager operated from 1880 to 1966. It was a daily newspaper until the mid-1950s when it became a tri-weekly publication. In the early 1960s it adopted a weekly schedule, published every Thursday. It was succeeded by the Nouveau Messager in 1966; but the following year, it closed as well for lack of funding.

The newspaper was operated out of 223 Lisbon Street in Lewiston, which became the home of Lewiston Auburn Magazine in September 2011.

== See also ==
- Early Franco-American newspapers
