= Printers' Ink =

American trade magazine

Printers' Ink was an American trade magazine launched in 1888 by George P. Rowell. It was the first national trade magazine for advertising. It was renamed Marketing/Communications in 1967 and ceased publication in 1972. From 1919 to 1941, it had a larger-size sister publication called Printers' Ink Monthly in addition to the weekly version.

== Printers' Ink model statute ==
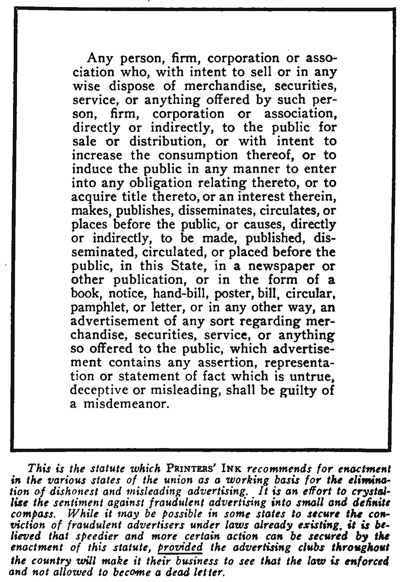
This is the text of the Printers' Ink model statute, a law proposed by advertisers in 1911 to address the problem of false advertising

Printers' Ink was famous for proposing a model law that created criminal penalties for false advertising in 1911. It was widely adopted in states; however, few prosecutors brought cases under it, because of prosecutorial resource constraints, and because it imposed strict liability (that is, the state did not have to prove intent to deceive) on false advertisers.
