= Goodloe Sutton =

American newspaper editor (1939–2023)

- Born: Howard Goodloe Sutton; January 31, 1939; Alabama, U.S.
- Died: September 22, 2023 (aged 84); Marengo County, Alabama, U.S.
- Education: University of Southern Mississippi
- Occupation: Newspaper editor
- Years active: 1964–2019
- Known for: Editor, publisher and owner of The Democrat-Reporter
- Spouses: Jean Rodgers (m. 1964; died 2003)
- Children: 2
- Parents: Robert E. Sutton (father); Lorie Chrietzburg Sutton (mother)

Howard Goodloe Sutton (January 31, 1939 – September 22, 2023) was an American newspaper editor, publisher, and owner. From 1964 to 2019, he published The Democrat-Reporter, a small weekly newspaper in Linden, Alabama. Sutton was widely celebrated in 1998 for publishing over four years a series of articles that exposed corruption in the Marengo County Sheriff's Office; he received awards and commendations and was suggested as a candidate for the Pulitzer Prize. In 2019, Sutton once again became the focus of national attention when he wrote and published an editorial suggesting the Ku Klux Klan be revived to carry out lynchings to "clean out" Washington, D.C.; he already had a local reputation for other, similarly inflammatory racist, sexist, antisemitic, Islamophobic, and homophobic editorials.

== Early life and career ==
Howard Goodloe Sutton was born in Alabama on January 31, 1939, the son of Robert E. Sutton and Lorie Chrietzburg Sutton. His father was the editor of The Democrat-Reporter newspaper and bought it in 1917.

Goodloe Sutton graduated from the University of Southern Mississippi and was editor of the school's student newspaper, Student Printz. It was there he met his future wife, Jean Rodgers; they married in 1964 and had two sons, Howard Goodloe Sutton Jr. and William Robert Sutton. Prior to taking over the family newspaper, the couple founded and owned several local newspapers in Demopolis, Camden, Thomasville, and Sumter County, Alabama. Sutton returned to his hometown and purchased The Democrat-Reporter from his father in 1964, taking over as editor and publisher. His wife soon joined him as an investigative reporter, later Managing Editor, at the paper. Jean died in 2003 after complications related to cancer, leaving Sutton feeling "like a zombie" and not knowing "what to do", for several years afterwards.

== Corruption exposés ==
In 1998, Sutton received widespread acclaim for articles exposing corruption in the Marengo County Sheriff's Office; he always credited his wife, Jean, "with laboring over courthouse records". These articles, many written by his wife, led to guilty pleas by Sheriff Roger Davis for extortion, soliciting a bribe, and failure to pay state income taxes on the extorted money, for which he received two concurrent 27-month sentences. For the series of articles with accompanying documentation Sutton was threatened; the Sheriff, according to Sutton, "started telling anyone who would listen that my oldest son was involved in drugs, my wife was having affairs and I was drunk all the time". He received death threats and lost circulation and $50,000 per year in advertising in his newspaper; a local church official told him to "lay off the sheriff". A deputy, Wilmer "Sonny" Breckenridge, threatened to plant drugs in Sutton's home, according to Sutton. He and his wife were randomly pulled over and harassed, as was their oldest son.

Their articles led to a federal undercover investigation, which in turn led to the arrest of 68 people in a drug raid. Breckenridge, who was Marengo County's chief drug enforcement officer, was convicted of conspiracy to sell drugs and was sentenced to life in prison without parole.

As a result of his reporting and editorials Sutton was awarded the Hugh M. Hefner First Amendment Award and the Society of Professional Journalists' Sunshine Award. He was inducted in 2007 into the University of Southern Mississippi's School of Mass Communication and Journalism Hall of Fame. In 2009, he received the Distinguished Community Journalist Award from Auburn University. Alabama representative Earl F. Hilliard read on the floor of Congress a declaration praising him, saying: "His story is a shining example of the best and the brightest which occurs in America when a single citizen has the bravery to stand alone, in the face of mounting pressure and odds, and stands up for justice and equality." He and his wife were also the subject of a People magazine article.

Two admiring readers submitted his work for the Pulitzer Prize for journalism, and he had supporting letters from other journalists. When the awards were to be announced a Fox News crew, a TV reporter, and a variety of other reporters were waiting with him, but he did not win.

Sutton had run for office in Alabama's 7th congressional district as a Democrat in 1978, losing in the primary. After the favorable publicity received in 1998, he ran in District 72 of the Alabama House of Representatives as a Republican, but lost to the incumbent in the general election. He was a registered Republican from at least the time of his most recent run for public office.

== Call for KKK revival ==
Alabama political reporter Chip Brownlee noticed and reprinted an editorial Sutton published in the February 14, 2019, issue of his newspaper. The editorial, in which he called for the revival of the Ku Klux Klan, received international attention.

When contacted by the Montgomery Advertiser, Sutton said "If we could get the Klan to go up there and clean out D.C., we'd all been better off." Asked to explain what he meant by "cleaning up D.C.," Sutton suggested lynching: "We'll get the hemp ropes out, loop them over a tall limb and hang all of them. …It's not calling for the lynchings of Americans. These are socialist-communists we're talking about. Do you know what socialism and communism is?"

According to the Advertiser, he said Klansmen "didn't kill but a few people". He added, "The Klan wasn't violent until they needed to be." He also compared the KKK to the NAACP.

This is only one of a series of recent inflammatory editorials in The Democrat-Reporter; according to state Sen. Bobby Singleton and Rep. Artis J. McCampbell, "He's been making those kind of racist epithets for a long time." Under an anonymous byline, a 2012 editorial read, "What will happen when the Ku Klux Klan is taken over by black people trying to run from the federal government?" A 2016 editorial called then-presidential candidate Hillary Clinton "a fat aft woman with a tubby tummy and jowls of a hog." He also called her "fat witch (or female dog)" and "little Miss Piggy," and expressed gratitude to Russia for helping Trump get elected. He claimed that an unnamed black mayor "displayed her African heritage by not enforcing civilized law". In a 2013 editorial, Sutton wrote: "Slavery was a good lesson for the Jews. They didn't act right, so God punished them by letting others conquer and enslave them... There are stories which publishing companies won't print about how the black people were banished into the wilderness of Africa because God hated them."

=== Reaction to the editorial ===
Alabama political columnist Kyle Whitmire, who had worked at The Democrat-Reporter as a young man, published a column in which he speculated that Sutton, 80 at the time of the editorial's release, had gone into sharp decline since the death of his wife in 2003 and might be suffering from dementia, alcoholism, or both. Sutton's editorial was criticized by Alabama Governor Kay Ivey, both of Alabama's U.S. Senators, and numerous other public figures, many of whom called on Sutton to resign. The University of Southern Mississippi removed him from its Mass Communication Hall of Fame and "strongly condemned" his remarks. Auburn University's Journalism Advisory Council rescinded the Distinguished Community Journalist Award Sutton had received in 2009. The Alabama Press Association censured Sutton, saying he "brought disgrace upon newspapers in Alabama and the profession," and suspended The Democrat-Reporter's membership in the organization.

Sutton responded to the criticism by saying that he was not sorry that he wrote the editorial, and that he would do it again if he had the chance. He also said that the point of the editorial was to be "ironic": "[A]ll these years, the FBI and the Department of Justice have been investigating the Klan and now, that shoe is on the other foot. (The FBI and Justice Department) are doing wrong and the Klan needs to investigate them. That’s what the point of (the editorial) was. Not a lot of people understand irony today." On February 21, Elecia R. Dexter, an African-American with human resources and operations experience, as well as a degree in speech communications, replaced Sutton as publisher and editor of The Democrat-Reporter. Without journalistic experience, she had been working as the paper's "front office clerk". Sutton retained ownership of the paper. She stepped down after a few weeks, because of "continuing interference from the editor she was meant to replace".

== Retirement and death ==
On July 1, 2019, Sutton sold The Democrat-Reporter and retired. The new owner, Tommy Wells, said that Sutton "doesn't even have a key anymore".

Sutton died at his home in Marengo County, Alabama, on September 22, 2023, at the age of 84.
