= Bank of Tryon Building =

Historic building in North Carolina, US

- U.S. National Register of Historic Places
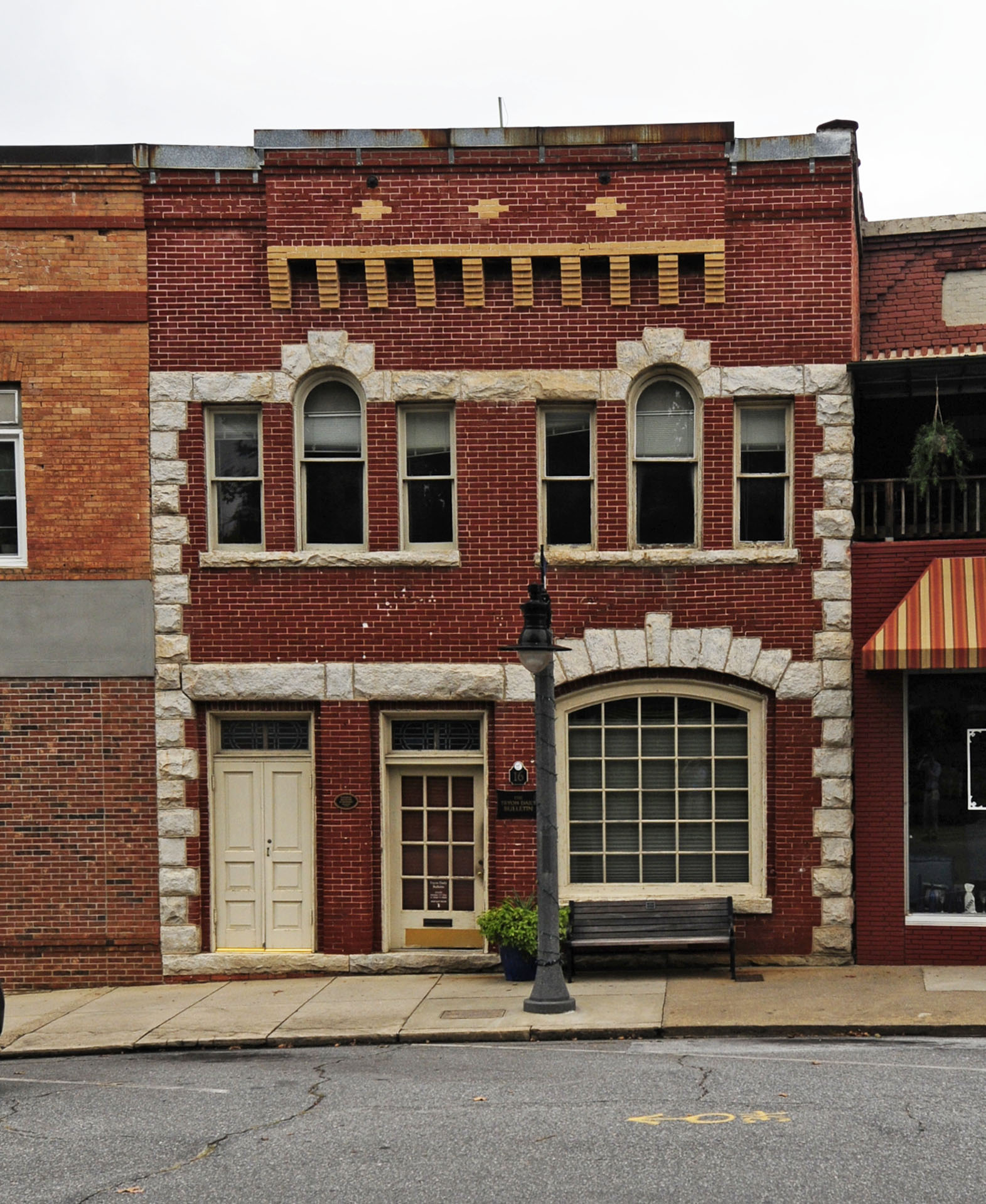
- Bank of Tryon Building, September 2012

- Location within North Carolina Location within the United States
- Location: 16 N. Trade St., Tryon, North Carolina
- Coordinates: 35°12′33″N 82°14′22″W
- Area: 0.1 acres (0.040 ha)
- Built: 1907-1908
- Architectural style: Romanesque
- NRHP reference No.: 07001408
- Added to NRHP: January 17, 2008

Bank of Tryon Building, also known as the Tryon Daily Bulletin Building and Hester Building, is a historic bank building located at Tryon, Polk County, North Carolina. It was built in 1907–1908, and is a two-story, two-bay, Romanesque Revival-style brick-and-stone building. It features granite quoins, second-story Palladian-type windows, and a projecting parapet. Since 1935, the building has been home to the Tryon Daily Bulletin, the world's smallest daily newspaper.

It was added to the National Register of Historic Places in 2008.
