= Courrier des États-Unis =

French language newspaper in the Americas in the 19th century

Courrier des Etats-Unis
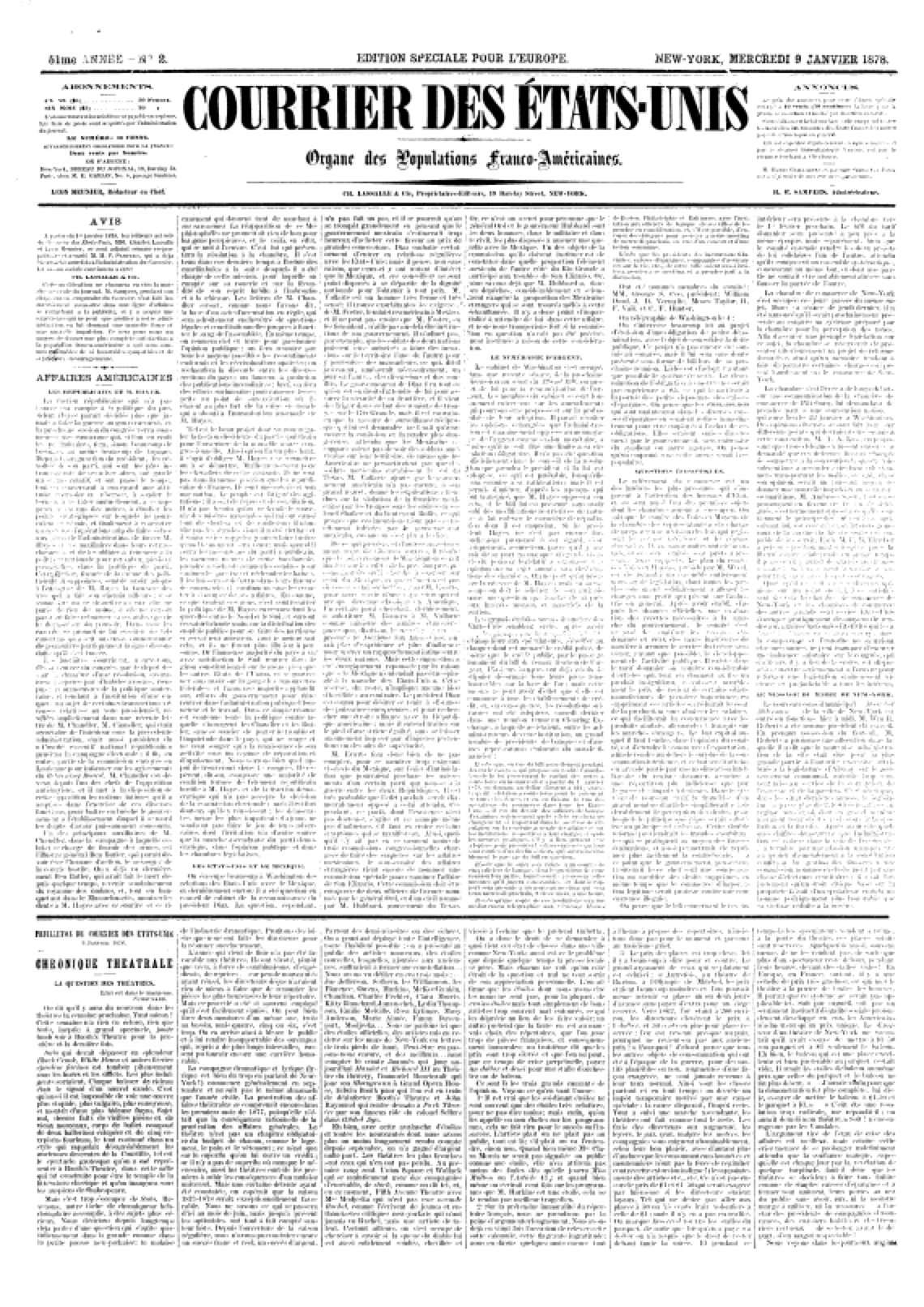
- Founded: 1828
- Headquarters: New York City, U.S.
- Area served: U.S., North and South America
- Key people: Félix Lacoste (founder)

The Courrier des Etats-Unis was a French language newspaper published by French emigrants in New York City. It was founded in 1828 by Félix Lacoste with the help of Joseph Bonaparte (Napoleon's older brother), who was living in New Jersey.

The Courrier was the most famous French newspaper across North America, South America and the Caribbean. In 1850, it had more than 11,000 registered readers and was distributed from Quebec to Río de la Plata, and from New York to San Francisco. It also had readers in France.

== Bonapartist period (1828-1836) ==
Founded by Félix Lacoste, a close friend of Joseph Bonaparte, the Courrier supported Bonapartism. Its readers were often Bonapartists or republicans in exile, including Général Charles Lallemand and Joseph Lakanal.

After the 1830 July Revolution in France, the Courrier attacked the new monarchy and the new king Louis Philippe I. It accused the monarchy of stealing the revolution's principles and forgetting what the French people had fought for. The newspaper argued that the Bonaparte family would be the best defender of the nation's will.

== Orleanist period (1836-1848) ==
After 1836, the Courrier became the property of German librarian Charles de Behr. He was a supporter of Louis-Philippe and shifted the newspaper's line accordingly.

In 1839, Frédéric Gaillardet (1808–1882) bought the Courrier. He stated that he wanted the Courrier to become the "organe des populations franco-américaines" (newspaper for the Franco-American population).

== Republican period (1848-1853) ==
When news of the French Revolution of 1848 reached New York, Gaillardet returned to France to participate in the construction of the new republic and defend his conservative ideas. He sold the Courrier to Paul Arpin, a French translator for the Louisiana newspaper L'Abeille de la Nouvelle-Orléans. Arpin turned it into a republican newspaper, attacking the royalists of the Parti de l'Ordre and Louis-Napoléon Bonaparte.

== After the Republican period ==
After the Republican period, the history of the Courrier des Etats-Unis became obscure. From 1854 to 1861, Régis de Trobriand was a joint editor. During the American Civil War it supported the South.

The newspaper switched from daily to weekly in 1937 and ceased publishing in 1938. It was restarted in 1941 and the weekly Amérique (started 1933) merged into it in 1943. It is still published today as the monthly France-Amérique.
