= Wetumpka Herald =

Twice-weekly paper serving Elmore County, Alabama

- Type: Weekly newspaper
- Format: Broadsheet
- Owner(s): Tallapoosa Publishers, Inc., a division of Boone Newspapers
- Founder(s): Howell Rose Golson
- Publisher: Steve Baker
- Founded: 1898
- Headquarters: 127 Company St, Wetumpka, AL 36092
- Circulation: 3,814
- ISSN: 1536-688X
- Website: thewetumpkaherald.com

The Wetumpka Herald is a weekly newspaper serving Elmore County, Alabama.

== History ==
The Herald was founded in 1898, as The Weekly Herald by Howell Rose Golson. He was succeeded by his son Howell Hunter Golson, making him one of the youngest editors in the state at that time. The elder Golson died in 1916 in an automobile accident.

From 1916 to 1932, H. R. Golson's daughter, Frances Golson, served as the first woman editor-publisher of the Herald, running it with her brother. Described as "bright, handsome, and marriageable" by the press, Frances Golson was the only woman delegate to the 1919 Alabama Press Association convention in Andalusia, Alabama.

In 1949, a fire at the Herald building did extensive damage to both the building and equipment.

In 1965, the Herald was purchased by John P. Harris, Sr. and his wife Ellen T. Harris. John Harris managed the paper until his death in 1979. After the death of John Harris, Ellen Harris (Williams) became publisher and continued to manage the paper until she retired in 2003. In 2003, the Herald was sold to former Alexander City Outlook editor Kim Price. At the time the Herald had a subscriber base of 5,600 and 15 employees. During the transition, Peggy Blackmon remained editor.
