= Pickens County Herald =

- Type: Weekly newspaper
- Format: Broadsheet
- Owner(s): Mid-South Newspapers Inc.
- Editor: Gena Huff
- Founded: 1904
- Headquarters: 215 Reform St, Carrollton, Pickens County, AL 35447
- Circulation: 4,000
- OCLC number: 15344667
- Website: pcherald.com

The Pickens County Herald is a newspaper serving Carrollton, Alabama. It is published once a week on Wednesday, with a circulation of just under 4,000. The current editor is Gena Huff, who took the helm in 2018, succeeding previous editor Bo Black.

== History ==
It was established as a Democratic paper in 1904 by Bert Smith and Marion Johnson, formerly of the Columbus Dispatch, and relaunched in 1913 under editor Ben I. Rapport, publishing on Tuesdays and Fridays. In 1914, Rapport was able to recapitalize the paper, bringing in $10,000 of investment and significantly expanding it. The investment allowed the purchase new linotype machines, and was accompanied by a move from Reform, Alabama to Carrollton, where the paper still currently resides.

Rapport was one of a number of Alabama newspaper editors to oppose the Ku Klux Klan, saying "I do not even care to make any mention of this worthless organization, thereby giving them publicity."

For about 40 years, the paper was edited by John ("Jack") Pratt of Carrollton, who was also vice president of the Alabama Press Association for part of that time.

From 1963 to 1986 the Herald was owned and edited by Euteal vann Junkin, a lifelong resident of the county, U.S. Army veteran, and owner of Herald Printing for 44 years.

In a 2001 interview on the importance of local weekly papers, then-editor Doug Sanders emphasized the value of "keeping an eye on local officials."

The Tuscaloosa News, which reported on the Herald's founding and later financing, has continued to cite the Herald for local news reports as recently as 2018.

In 2018, an editorial in the Daily Mountain Eagle identified the Herald, along with itself, the Journal Record, and the Time-Record, as the key news organizations in the area Bevill State Community College serves.
