= Franklin Banner-Tribune =

- Type: Daily newspaper
- Owner: Louisiana State Newspapers
- Publisher: Allan Von Werder
- Editor: Roger Stouff
- Language: English
- Headquarters: Franklin, Louisiana
- Circulation: 1,500
- Sister newspapers: Morgan City Daily Review
- Website: banner-tribune.com

The Franklin Banner-Tribune is a small bi-weekly newspaper which circulates in Franklin, the parish seat of St. Mary Parish, Louisiana.

== History ==
The original newspaper dates to before the American Civil War. From 1950-1965, the Banner-Tribune was edited and published by Robert Angers, who thereafter founded Acadiana Profile magazine. During Angers' tenure, the newspaper was expanded from a weekly to a daily and won a large number of press association awards. Since Allan Von Werder took the helm the paper has struggled and cut back to printing twice a week.
