= Austin Daily Herald =

Newspaper in Austin, Minnesota

Coordinates: 43.669021°N 92.971877°W

The Austin Daily Herald
- Type: Twice-weekly newspaper
- Format: Broadsheet
- Owner(s): Boone Newspapers, Austin Daily Herald Inc.
- Founder(s): A.B. Hunkins
- Publisher: Crystal Miller
- Editor: Eric Johnson
- Founded: 1891
- Headquarters: 310 2nd St. NE; Austin, MN 55912 United States
- City: Austin
- Country: United States
- Circulation: 2,388 (as of 2024)
- ISSN: 0746-9713
- OCLC number: 9870692
- Website: austindailyherald.com

The Austin Daily Herald is an American, English language newspaper published Wednesday and Saturday mornings in Austin, Minnesota.

It was founded in 1891 as a six-day-a-week daily by A.B. Hunkins, inventor of the automatic addressing press.

The Austin Daily Herald is owned by Boone Newspapers, Inc.
