= Tidewater News =

- Type: Thrice-weekly newspaper
- Format: Broadsheet
- Owner(s): Tidewater Publications LLC, a subsidiary of Boone Newspapers
- Founder: Paul Scarborough
- Publisher: Ed Pugh
- Staff writers: Stephen Cowles, Stephen Faleski, Titus Mohler
- Business manager: Michelle Gray
- Founded: 1905
- Language: English
- Headquarters: 1000 Armory Drive, Franklin, Virginia United States
- Website: thetidewaternews.com

Tidewater News is a newspaper based in Franklin, Virginia covering Franklin, Southampton County and Isle of Wight County. Since November, 2006, it has been published three days a week.
