= The Democrat-Reporter =

Local weekly newspaper in Linden, Alabama

- Type: Weekly newspaper
- Owner: Tommy Wells
- Founded: 1911
- Language: English
- City: Linden, Alabama, U.S.
- OCLC number: 11800888

The Democrat-Reporter is a local weekly newspaper in Linden, Alabama, United States. It was established in 1911 from the merger of the Linden Reporter and the Marengo Democrat. The newspaper was published by the Sutton family for over a century, with Goodloe Sutton running it from 1985 to 2019. The newspaper won national acclaim in the 1990s for its investigation of a corrupt county sheriff, but was met with criticism in early 2019 over an editorial from Sutton calling for the return of the Ku Klux Klan.

Sutton resigned as publisher and editor on February 22, 2019, and appointed Elecia R. Dexter to the two roles while he retained ownership. Dexter resigned less than a month later, citing ongoing interference from Sutton, and a deal to sell the paper to an out-of-state couple fell through a month later. The newspaper was sold to Tommy Wells in July 2019, as Sutton announced his retirement.

== History ==
The Linden Reporter was created in 1879 and the Marengo Democrat was founded in 1899. The two newspapers merged to form The Democrat-Reporter in 1911. Robert E. Sutton bought the newspaper in 1917 and was its managing editor and publisher until 1965. He sold The Democrat-Reporter to his son Goodloe in 1982. Goodloe Sutton also worked alongside his wife, Jean, until her death in 2003.

The newspaper won national acclaim in the 1990s for its investigation of county sheriff Roger Davis for political corruption, despite his widespread popularity and death threats to editor Goodloe Sutton and his family. Davis and two deputies from the office were sentenced for misuse of public funds and other crimes, including intimidation tactics used against the Suttons. The four-year investigative series was considered a favorite for a Pulitzer Prize nomination in 1998, though the newspaper was not a finalist. The Suttons were interviewed by The New York Times, the American Journalism Review, Reader's Digest, and the Oprah Winfrey Show. Goodloe Sutton was also honored by Representative Earl F. Hilliard in a remark to Congress on May 6, 1998, for his bravery. Goodloe Sutton ran unsuccessfully for the state house in 1998, losing to incumbent Andrew Hayden despite an ethics controversy.

The Democrat-Reporter had a longstanding rivalry with the Demopolis Times, which is published in neighboring Demopolis. The Democrat-Reporter absorbed the Thomasville News (of Thomasville) in 2006, after a decade under the ownership of the Sutton family. The newspaper's circulation dropped from 7,000 to 3,000 by the mid-2010s, and printing was outsourced to a plant in Monroeville. The offices for The Democrat-Reporter were moved in 2015 to a new building farther away from the county courthouse. The newspaper is published weekly on Thursdays and generally contains eight pages, including local news, legal notices, and an editorial page.

=== KKK editorial and new ownership ===
On February 14, 2019, The Democrat-Reporter publisher Goodloe Sutton wrote an editorial titled "Klan needs to ride again", calling for the return of the Ku Klux Klan to "clean out Washington D.C." with lynchings. "We'll get the hemp ropes out, loop them over a tall limb and hang all of them", Sutton said. He also specified that he was only referring to hanging "socialist-communists", and compared the Klan to the NAACP.

The editorial led to calls on Sutton to resign by senators Doug Jones and Richard Shelby, while other local politicians stated that they were not surprised by the comments. The editorial was first discovered and shared by the student-run Auburn Plainsman.

Sutton had previously been criticized for running offensive headlines and editorials, including comments about the Obama family and Hillary Clinton, but they did not get as much attention. Subscriptions to the newspaper declined as Linden residents responded negatively to the editorial and its widespread attention. Sutton's alma mater, the University of Southern Mississippi, removed him from the School of Communication's Mass Communication Hall of Fame over the editorial, and he was also stripped of a distinguished community journalism award he had been presented in 2009 by Auburn University's Journalism Advisory Council. Sutton responded to the criticism by saying that he was not sorry that he wrote the editorial, and that he would do it again if he had the chance.

On February 22, Sutton announced that he would resign from his positions as publisher and editor, giving control of the newspaper to Elecia R. Dexter. Dexter, an African-American woman with a degree in speech communications from Eastern Illinois University, had been employed at The Democrat-Reporter as a front-desk employee for six weeks at the time of the editorial, but had no journalism experience. Sutton retained ownership of the newspaper. Dexter resigned the editorship on March 11, two weeks after taking the position, due to editorial changes made by Sutton without her permission. In an interview with The New York Times, Dexter said that Sutton had emailed a version of the February 28 issue of the newspaper that replaced an article about his retirement with a defense of the KKK editorial and attacks against the Montgomery Advertiser for publishing an interview with him. She stated that her resignation was made after further changes to the March 14 issue, but was delayed over concerns for Sutton's cognitive well-being.

The Associated Press reported in late March that Sutton had sold the newspaper to an unnamed buyer, who were later identified as out-of-state residents C.T. Harless and Sabrina McMahan in a front-page editorial on March 28. Online news outlet Alabama Political Reporter published an investigation into Harless, who was using a pseudonym, and linked him to a group aligned with the Ku Klux Klan from Tennessee. Linden mayor Charles Moore expressed skepticism over whether the newspaper had actually been sold, while Sutton stated that he would continue operating the newspaper because the new owners lacked experience. In July, the Associated Press reported that Sutton had retired and sold the newspaper to Tommy Wells, a sports publicist from Texas who had previously shown interest in acquiring the Democrat-Reporter. Wells and his wife published their first edition on July 5, 2019, with the announcement of Sutton's retirement. Sutton died four years later at the age of 84 on Sept. 22, 2023.
