= The Tallassee Tribune =

- Type: Weekly newspaper
- Owner(s): Boone Newspapers
- Editor: Steve Baker
- Founded: 1919
- Headquarters: Tallassee, Alabama
- Circulation: 3,000
- Website: tallasseetribune.com

The Tallassee Tribune is a weekly newspaper serving Tallassee, Alabama, United States, and surrounding Elmore County. It is currently owned by Tallapoosa Publishers Inc.

== History ==
The Tallassee Tribune was founded in 1919 by N.R. Thompson as an independent paper. Thompson had started his journalism career at the Franklin County Times, and worked at the Birmingham Ledger, and Birmingham Age-Herald. After he collapsed from a heart attack in 1931, the ownership of the paper passed to his two sons, with his son Dick Thompson assuming editorship.

Early in Dick Thompson's tenure, the paper was thrown into the national spotlight when federal commissioner Eugene Dunnegan was sent by the Roosevelt administration to Tallassee as a labor dispute mediator. Citing broad powers under the National Industrial Recovery Act, Dunnegan reportedly told Thompson that editorials Thompson had written against organized labor violated Section 7 of Title I of that act, and, according to Thompson's account, Thompson was told to "desist". Thompson responded with a front-page editorial defending the rights of the press.

Though accounts differ on the specifics of the meeting, the national firestorm that followed resulted in Secretary of Labor Frances Perkins issuing a clarifying edict that Department of Labor conciliators should not interfere with the press. "Please keep in mind always in your work of adjusting industrial disputes," read the edict, "that you have no right to tell any editor what he may or may not print in his news or editorial column. There is nothing in the NRA or any other federal statute which gives you such a right." The entirety of Title I of the act was later ruled unconstitutional.

The Tribune changed hands a number of times after the Thompson family sold it.

Hunter Golson, son of H.H. Golson, the legendary editor of the Wetumpka Herald, published the newspaper for a time, before moving on. He sold the paper to Ben Green in 1943.

Green ran the paper to wide acclaim for a few years, but retired due to ill health, selling the paper former editor of the Farm Bureau News and returning WWII veteran Herve Charest in June 1946. Charest had left the Farm Bureau in 1942 to enlist, but on his return looked for a new opportunity. Charest would run the paper from 1946 until the late 1960s. For his service to the community, he was presented with the "Governor's Trophy" at the Alabama Press Association by then Governor George Wallace.

In 1970, Jack Venable bought the paper with his wife Jo, and ran it until his 2005 death. A graduate of Auburn University, Venable had been a reporter for WSFA-TV in Montgomery from 1963 to 1967.

The paper was purchased in 2009 by Kim Price, as part of the newly formed Price Publishing, and then sold to Tallapoosa Publishers Inc. (TPI) after Price's death in 2012. It currently operates as part of the TPI network, with a system of managing editors for individual papers reporting to an multi-paper editor, most recently the editor of the Alexander City Outlook.

In 2015, the Tribune won a first-place award for best in-depth coverage from the Alabama Press Association, which singled out its piece on Ku Klux Klan recruiting in Tallassee as providing "excellent coverage of a controversial topic."
