= Picayune Item =

Daily newspaper in Picayune, Mississippi

- The Voice of Pearl River County Since 1904
- Type: Weekly newspaper
- Format: Broadsheet
- Owner(s): Boone Newspapers
- Publisher: David Singleton (Regional)
- Staff writers: Alexander Moraski
- General Manager: David Singleton
- Founded: 1904
- Headquarters: 17 Richardson-Ozona Road; Picayune, Mississippi 39466 United States
- Circulation: 6,136 weekly
- Sister newspapers: Bogalusa Daily News
- OCLC number: 32270489
- Website: picayuneitem.com

The Picayune Item is a weekly newspaper published in Picayune, Mississippi, United States, covering Pearl River County and parts of Hancock County, Mississippi. It publishes on Thursdays, sharing editorial and business functions with sister paper in Louisiana, the Bogalusa Daily News. Prior to 2023 the Item published five times per week, Tuesday through Friday in the evenings, and on Sunday mornings.

== History ==
Boone Newspapers purchased the newspaper from Community Newspaper Holdings in 2013.

The changeover in publication started July 5, 2023.
