= Le Courrier des Amériques =

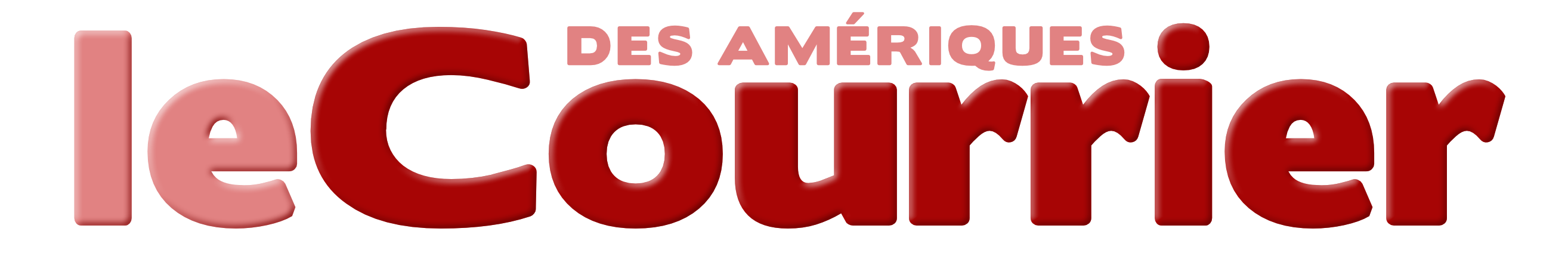
- Founded: July 1, 2013; 12 years ago
- Headquarters: Miami, Florida, U.S.
- Area served: Florida
- Key people: Gwendal Gauthier (CEO and founder)
- Website: courrierdesameriques.com

Le Courrier des Amériques is a free monthly French-speaking newspaper in Florida, on paper and on internet, founded in 2013 by Gwendal Gauthier. It has initially been named "Le Courrier de Floride" in 2013, but the name changed in Le Courrier des Amériques in 2020 (it had been interrupted during the Covid19 crises). But this is the same newspaper edited by the same company. Hard copies of Le Courrier des Amériques are distributed in French stores, at consulates, and in schools, in Florida.

The first issue of the journal included an exclusive interview with the then-outgoing Consul général de France à Miami, Gaël de Maisonneuve. Le Courrier de Floride also included interviews of other French officials, such as the new consul of France in Miami, the consul of Canada in Miami, and the first interview of the new ambassador of France to the United States, Gérard Araud. An interview published at the French consul's website notes that it had been a long time since any French newspaper appeared at a local level in the United States, perhaps not since French-language newspapers in Louisiana ceased publishing in the early 1900s (The New Orleans Bee, which published from 1827 to 1923, has been reported to be the last French-language newspaper of New Orleans.)

The newspaper serves a large population (approximately three million) of French-speaking inhabitants and visitors in Florida, including expatriates and immigrants from Haiti and other countries, and numerous French-Canadian Snowbird visitors during the six cold months in Québec, with many of the snowbirds staying in Broward County communities of Hollywood, Hallandale, Pompano Beach and Fort Lauderdale. French is now the third most widely spoken language in Florida, after English and Spanish, with approximately 500,000 residents in the 2010 census speaking French or French Creole (mostly Haitian Creole) as their first language. Back in 2003, Florida became the state or province having the second-greatest number of French-speakers, behind only Quebec, passing Ontario. 36% of all French Creole speakers in the U.S., and 4% of all French speakers, lived in Miami in 2007.

== See also ==
- List of French-language newspapers published in the United States
