= Bucharest Daily News =

- Editor: Cristian Hățiș
- Categories: News
- Frequency: Daily
- Publisher: Buzz Publishing
- Country: Romania
- Language: English
- Website: bucharestdailynews.com

Bucharest Daily News is an English-language online newspaper operating out of the Romanian capital city, Bucharest.

At first it was launched as a printed newspaper and was frequently cited as a source by the sudden influx of Romanian news articles on Wikinews. It covered world and local news, politics, business, arts and leisure, sports and feature stories. In early 2006, the publication received much attention for a series on the effects of an EU-imposed ban on international adoptions from Romania. The articles called attention to the poor conditions in Romanian orphanages and children's hospitals while the ban was being lauded by former European Parliament Rapporteur for Romania, Baroness Emma Nicholson.

In August 2006 the Daily News staff was given their usual summer holiday. While the paper's website was published and updated for another few months, the printing of the paper stopped. The newspaper and its website were eventually shut down and have not been restarted.

17 years later, in 2023, the trade mark was registered again at the Romanian State Office for Inventions and Trademarks by another publishing company and the publication relaunched, but only in online format, without the printed edition.
