= Ouachita Citizen =

Newspaper in West Monroe, Louisiana

- Type: Weekly newspaper
- Format: Broadsheet
- Owner(s): Hanna Family
- Publisher: Hanna Newspapers
- Editor: Zach Parker
- Founded: 1924
- Headquarters: West Monroe, Louisiana United States
- Circulation: 5,200
- ISSN: 0746-7478
- OCLC number: 10239747
- Website: www.hannapub.com/ouachitacitizen/

The Ouachita Citizen is a weekly newspaper published in West Monroe, Louisiana.

== History ==
The Ouachita Citizen began publication in 1924 as West Monroe Churchman. Through a succession of owner-publishers, the name became West Monroe Citizen in 1925 and Ouachita Citizen in 1928. For more than two decades, it was published by Bert Hatten, the mayor of West Monroe from 1966 to 1978. Since 1996, the Ouachita Citizen has been part of Sam Hanna Newspapers, a family-owned cluster including the Concordia Sentinel in Ferriday and Vidalia, Louisiana, and the Franklin Sun in Winnsboro. As of 2014, the paid circulation of all three newspapers was 17,500, with the Ouachita Citizen having 5,200 subscribers. The Sam Hanna family has long been active in the Louisiana Press Association.

In the spring of 2014, the Ouachita Citizen became the source of a national news story when a video was anonymously left with the newspaper. The video, which went viral once released by the Ouachita Citizen, allegedly showed United States Representative Vance McAllister (R – Swartz) in a controversial kissing embrace with a member of his congressional staff, both of them being married to others.

== See also ==
- Monroe Free Press: weekly newspaper serving the African American community
