= List of French-language newspapers published in the United States =

An 1893 publication of The New Orleans Bee

During the 19th and 20th centuries, hundreds of French-language newspapers, many short-lived, were published in the United States by Franco-Americans, immigrants from Canada, France, and other French-speaking countries. In New England alone, more than 250 journals had been established and ceased publication before 1940. In the latter half of the 20th century Americanization, the adoption of mass media and the English only movement resulted in a severe decline in French-language newspapers, with many defunct by the end of the Second World War. Of those extant today, many originate from French-Canadian and Haitian-American communities living in the United States.

== Current ==
This is list of French language newspapers which are presently being published in the United States:

Newspaper	State	Town	Year established	Notes
Le Courrier des Amériques	Florida	Miami	2013	Reports news with focus on Florida and U.S. issues of interest to French-speaking population of Florida and more generally. Monthly free newspaper distributed in Florida and on-line.
Le Soleil de la Floride	Florida	Miami	1983	Everything of interest about Florida to French-speaking residents and visitors. Monthly between May and October and weekly from November to April, free newspaper distributed in Florida and Canada with a large on-line presence. 350,000 copies are distributed in Florida, with 25 publications yearly.
France-Amérique	New York	New York	1943	During 1960s was the weekly, international edition of French daily Le Figaro. Was bi-weekly during 1977–78. Became a monthly magazine in 2008. Asserts itself to be "America’s only national French-language publication, serving an audience of French expatriates, Francophones and French-speaking Americans" and to be "America’s largest French-language magazine", with circulation of 30,500 copies and 120,000 readers.
Le Militant	New York	New York	2012	An international socialist paper, historically of Trotskyist perspective. Currently a newsweekly that is published in U.S. and distributed in U.S., Canada, U.K., Australia, Sweden and other countries. Published in English since 1928, also in Spanish since 2005, and also in French since 2012.
Haïti Progrès	New York	Brooklyn	1983	Focuses on news from Haiti or concerning Haiti; published in French, in English and in Haitian Creole.
Le Forum	Maine	Orono	1974	Le FORUM is a French bilingual, socio-cultural periodical published by the Franco-American Centre. It is a major voice for Franco Americans both throughout Maine and nationally, and has become a unique vehicle for the dissemination of works and information by and about Franco Americans.
Haïti en Marche	Florida	Miami	1986	Haiti en Marche is a weekly publication distributed in New York, Miami, Haiti, Boston, Montreal, Chicago, France, Switzerland, and has subscribers around the world.
Haïti Observateur	New York	Brooklyn	1971	Haïti-Observateur is a leading Haitian weekly appealing to a broad cross-section of the Haitian community as well as the wider Caribbean market. The Haïti-Observateur has offices in New York, Montreal, Port-au-Prince, Haiti, and representatives in Paris and most cities on the Eastern Seaboard and as far inland as Chicago. It has a circulation of 75,000 copies weekly.
Carrefour Floride	Florida	Miami	2004	Information magazine and practical service guide distributed in Southeast Florida exclusively free of charge from November to April, serving French-speaking snowbirds and tourists at various service points in the three counties of : Miami-Dade -Broward and Palm Beach.
Le Journal de Floride	Florida	Miami	2004	A publication for French-speaking readership and the Snowbirds in Florida, disseminating information across four continents: North America, South America, Southern Europe and Africa, with a varied and general content disseminating news of the day, both on the national and international stage.

== Defunct ==
Newspaper	State	Town	Year established	Notes
Le Courrier Français	California	Los Angeles	1920	
Union Nouvelle	California	Los Angeles		
Le Petit Journal	California	San Francisco		
The Neutral	Florida	Pensacola	1847	Also published in English.
Le Combat	Illinois	Chicago	1889	
Le Bulletin Officiel	Illinois	Chicago	1894	
Le Petit Journal de Chicago	Illinois	Chicago	1904	
Le Courrier de l'Ouest	Illinois	Chicago	1903	
Le Courrier-Canadien	Illinois	Chicago	1904	
L'Echo des Deux Mondes	Illinois	Chicago	1903	
L’Abeille de la Nouvelle-Orléans	Louisiana	New Orleans	1827–1923	
La Guèpe	Louisiana	New Orleans	1910	
Le Louisianais	Louisiana	Convent	1865	
Le Moniteur de la Louisiane	Louisiana	New Orleans	1794	
Le Propagateur Catholique	Louisiana	New Orleans	1842	
Courrier de la Louisiane	Louisiana		1807–1860	
L'Union	Louisiana	New Orleans	1862	Also published in English
Le Messager	Maine	Lewiston	1880	
La Revue	Maine	Augusta	1911	
Le Figaro	Maine	Biddeford	1895	
La Justice de Biddeford	Maine	Biddeford	1911	
Le Courrier du Maine	Maine	Lewiston	1906	
Le Petit Journal	Maine	Lewiston	1911	
Le Messager	Maine	Lewiston	1880-1966	Unsuccessful relaunch as the Nouveau Messager in 1966–1967
Le Journal de Madawaska	Maine	Van Buren	1902–1906	
Le Maine Français	Maine	Waterville	1913	
Courier de Boston	Massachusetts	Boston	1789	
La République	Massachusetts	Boston	1876	
L'Indépendant	Massachusetts	Fall River	1884-1963	
L'Américain	Massachusetts	Fall River	1903	
Le Petit Courrier	Massachusetts	Fall River	1907	
Le Correspondant	Massachusetts	Fall River	1909	
La Liberté	Massachusetts	Fall River	1919	
Liberté	Massachusetts	Fitchburg	1920	
Le Citoyen	Massachusetts	Haverhill	1911	
Courrier de Holyoke	Massachusetts	Holyoke	1874	
Le Défenseur	Massachusetts	Holyoke	1884–1894	
La Presse	Massachusetts	Holyoke	1895–1903	
La Justice	Massachusetts	Holyoke	1903–1964	Bilingual publication during final decade.
Le Courrier National	Massachusetts	Lawrence	1907	
Le Progrès	Massachusetts	Lawrence	1907	
Le Courrier de Lawrence	Massachusetts	Lawrence	1911–1921	
Le Patriote	Massachusetts	Lawrence	1911	
l'Écho du Canada	Massachusetts	Lowell	1874	
La République	Massachusetts	Lowell	1875	
La Sentinelle	Massachusetts	Lowell	1880	
L'Abeille	Massachusetts	Lowell	1881-1885	
Journal du Commerce	Massachusetts	Lowell	1883-1885	
Gazette de Lowell	Massachusetts	Lowell	1886	
Le Courrier des États-Unis	Massachusetts	Lowell	1886	
L'Étoile	Massachusetts	Lowell	1886–1957	
Le Citoyen	Massachusetts	Lowell	1887	
Le Farceur	Massachusetts	Lowell	1889	
L'Union	Massachusetts	Lowell	1889–1890	
L'Indépendance	Massachusetts	Lowell	1890	
Le National	Massachusetts	Lowell	1890–1895	
La Vie	Massachusetts	Lowell	1892	
La République	Massachusetts	Lowell	1901–1902	
Revue de Lowell	Massachusetts	Lowell	1902–1904	
Le Franco-Américain	Massachusetts	Lowell	1907	
Le Réveil	Massachusetts	Lowell	1908–1909	
La Blette	Massachusetts	Lowell	1909–1910	
La Vérité	Massachusetts	Lowell	1910	
Le Clairon	Massachusetts	Lowell	1911–1915	
Le Journal de Lowell	Massachusetts	Lowell	1975–1995	
Le Courrier de Lynn	Massachusetts	Lynn	1911	
Le Lynnois	Massachusetts	Lynn	1895	
L'Estafette	Massachusetts	Marlborough	1907	
Le Petit Journal	Massachusetts	New Bedford	1909	
L'Écho	Massachusetts	New Bedford	1911	
L'Indépendant	Massachusetts	New Bedford	1910	
Le journal	Massachusetts	New Bedford	1911	
Le Courrier de Salem	Massachusetts	Salem	1902	
L'Ouvrier	Massachusetts	Southbridge	1903	
Le Guide du Peuple	Massachusetts	Spencer	1886	
Le Forestier	Massachusetts	Springfield	1910	
Le Journal de Taunton	Massachusetts	Taunton	1882	
Le Travailleur	Massachusetts	Worcester	1874	
Le Courrier de Worcester	Massachusetts	Worcester	1880	
Le Saint-Jean Baptiste	Massachusetts	Worcester	1883	
Le Canadien Américain	Massachusetts	Worcester	1907–1912	
Le Journal	Massachusetts	Worcester	1907	
L'Opinion Publique	Massachusetts	Worcester	1893	
L'Ouest Français	Michigan	Bay City	1888	
Le Moniteur Français	Michigan	Detroit	1910	
L'oeil	Minnesota	Minneapolis	1893	
Echo de L'Ouest	Minnesota	Minneapolis	1915	
Voix du Lac	Minnesota	Minneapolis	1893	
Le Canadien	Minnesota	St. Paul	1903	
Patriote et le phare des Lacs Réunis	Missouri	St. Louis	1878	
La Voix du Peuple	New Hampshire	Manchester	1869	
Courrier du New Hampshire	New Hampshire	Manchester	1886	
L'Avenir National	New Hampshire	Manchester	1888	
La Revue Rose	New Hampshire	Manchester	1906	
La New England	New Hampshire	Manchester	1907	
La Nation	New Hampshire	Manchester	1908	
Le Canado-Américain	New Hampshire	Manchester	1911	
Le Réveil	New Hampshire	Manchester		
L'Impartial	New Hampshire	Nashua	1911	
Le Progrès	New Hampshire	Nashua	1912	
La Patrie	New York	Cohoes	1887	
Le Drapeau National	New York	Glen Falls	1881	
Courrier des États-Unis	New York	New York City	1828	
La Feuille D'Érable	New York	New York City	1887	
Courrier des États-Unis	New York	New York City	1909	
Gazette Franco-Américaine	New York	New York City	1920	
Amérique	New York	New York City	1933	
France-Amérique	New York	New York City	1943	Changed to a magazine format after 2008
Le Canadien des États	New York	Plattsburgh	1884	
Le National	New York	Plattsburgh	1886	
Le Messager Canadien	New York	Plattsburgh	1903	
Le Canadien-Français	New York	Plattsburgh	1905	
Le Progrès	New York	Plattsburgh	1909	
L'Union des Travailleurs	Pennsylvania	Charleroi	1910	
Le courier de l'Amerique	Pennsylvania	Philadelphia	1792	
L'Abeille américaine	Pennsylvania	Philadelphia	1815	
La Justice	Rhode Island	Central Falls	1907	
La Vérité	Rhode Island	Central Falls	1911	
Le Jean Baptiste	Rhode Island	Pawtucket	1907	
Liberté	Rhode Island	Providence	1916	
La Voix de la Vallée	Rhode Island	West Warwick	1909	
Le Courrier de Woonsocket	Rhode Island	Woonsocket	1883	
La Tribune	Rhode Island	Woonsocket	1895	
L'Union	Rhode Island	Woonsocket	1900	Official publication of L'Union Saint-Jean-Baptiste d'Amérique.
Le Devoir	Rhode Island	Woonsocket	1912	
La Révolution Canadienne	Vermont	Burlington	1838	
Le Patriote Canadien	Vermont	Burlington	1839–1840	
L'Idée Nouvelle	Vermont	Burlington	1869	
Le Protecteur Canadien	Vermont	St. Albans		
Le Nord Américain	Vermont	Swanton	1839	
L'Union Canadienne	Vermont	Vergennes	1870–1920	
