= Atmore Advance =

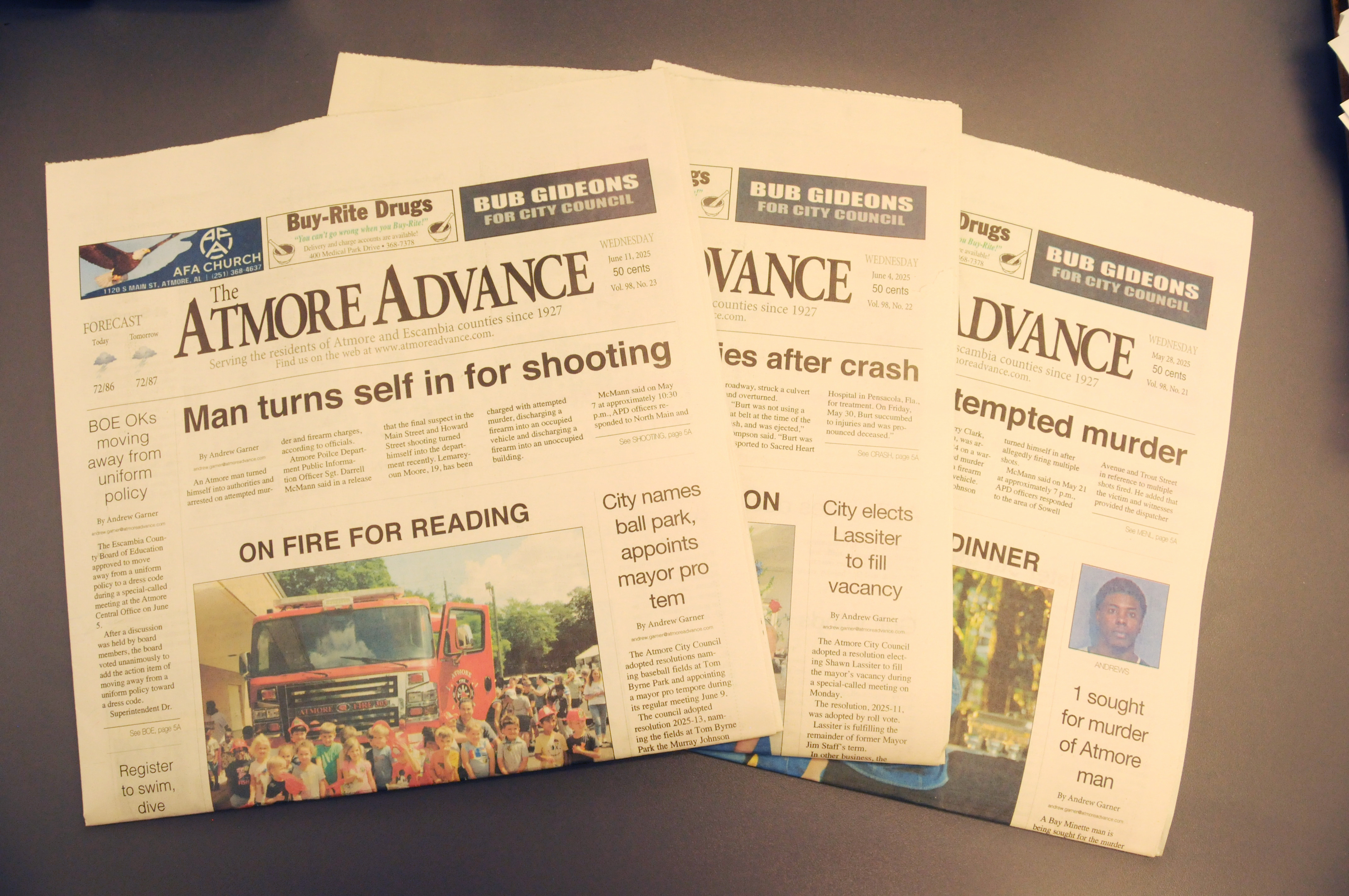
- Front Page of 2025 Atmore Advance
- Type: Weekly newspaper
- Format: Broadsheet
- Owner(s): Jeff and Michelle Schumacher
- Publisher: JM Media Group LLC
- Editor: Andrew Garner
- Founded: 1927
- Headquarters: Escambia County, Alabama
- Circulation: 2,171
- ISSN: 0746-1968
- OCLC number: 9848767
- Website: atmoreadvance.com

The Atmore Advance was founded in 1927 in Atmore, Alabama. It has a circulation of approximately 2,000, and serves Atmore and surrounding Escambia County, Alabama. It is published each Wednesday by Atmore Newspapers, Inc.

Through its early history the editorial board was supportive of the Democratic Party. However, the editorial board broke with tradition in 1964, endorsing Republican Barry Goldwater for President.

In 1979, the paper was purchased by Morris Newspaper Corporation from long-time owner Bob Morrisette. Morrisette, who had bought the paper in 1959 with Philipp Sokol, was a past president of the Alabama Press Association. He stayed on with the board of the directors during the transition.

In 2025, Boone Newspapers sold the paper to Jeff and Michelle Schumacher, who own and operate JM Media Group.
