= Andalusia Star News =

Newspaper in Andalusia, Alabama

Andalusia Star-News
- Type: Twice Weekly (Wednesday and Saturday)
- Format: Broadsheet
- Owner(s): Jeff and Michelle Schumacher.
- Publisher: JM Media Group, LLC
- Editor: Zach Maio
- Founded: 1948
- Headquarters: Andalusia, Alabama
- Circulation: 3,372
- ISSN: 0746-2115
- OCLC number: 9865133
- Website: andalusiastarnews.com

The Andalusia Star-News was formed in 1948 out of the merger of the Andalusia Star and the Covington News, both of Andalusia, Alabama. It has a circulation of 3,372 and is owned by Boone Newspapers, Inc.

In 1972, it was sold to Tuscaloosa Newspapers by Ed Dannelly and Byron Vickery, who had operated it since 1948. Tuscaloosa Newspapers would later become Boone Newspapers, Inc.

In 2025, Boone Newspapers sold the paper to Jeff and Michelle Schumacher.
