= LaGrange Daily News =

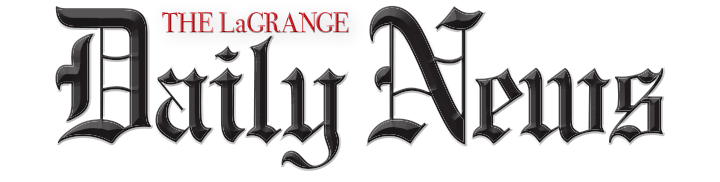
- Type: Daily newspaper
- Owner: Boone Newspapers Inc
- Publisher: Jennie Overfelt
- Editor: Annie Bresee
- Staff writers: Tommy Murphy, Ethan Strang
- Founded: 1843
- Language: English
- Circulation: 7,747 (as of 2013)
- Website: lagrangenews.com

The LaGrange Daily News has been serving LaGrange and the residents of Troup County, Georgia and surrounding areas since 1843 when it was launched by a Dr. Bronson as a weekly newspaper called the LaGrange Herald. Among the paper's first editors was future Georgia Supreme Court justice Alexander M. Speer. The paper's name was changed later to the Chattahoochee, and in the 1860s, The LaGrange Reporter. Thomas J. Bacon edited the paper for several years until departing in 1861 to fight in the Civil War, and was killed the next year. C.H.C. Willingham was the editor immediately following the war; he published criticisms of federal intervention in the South that nearly got him arrested. After a merger of the LaGrange Reporter, LaGrange Graphic and LaGrange Shuttle in 1928, the combined publications became the LaGrange Daily News.

LaGrange Daily News is owned by Boone Newspapers, Inc. which owns community newspapers throughout the Southeast, Texas, Minnesota, Kentucky, Ohio and Michigan. Boone acquired the paper from Civitas Media in 2016.

It is printed two times a week (Wednesday and Saturday), with on-line editions available Tuesday through Saturday.
