= Salisbury Post =

Newspaper in Salisbury, North Carolina

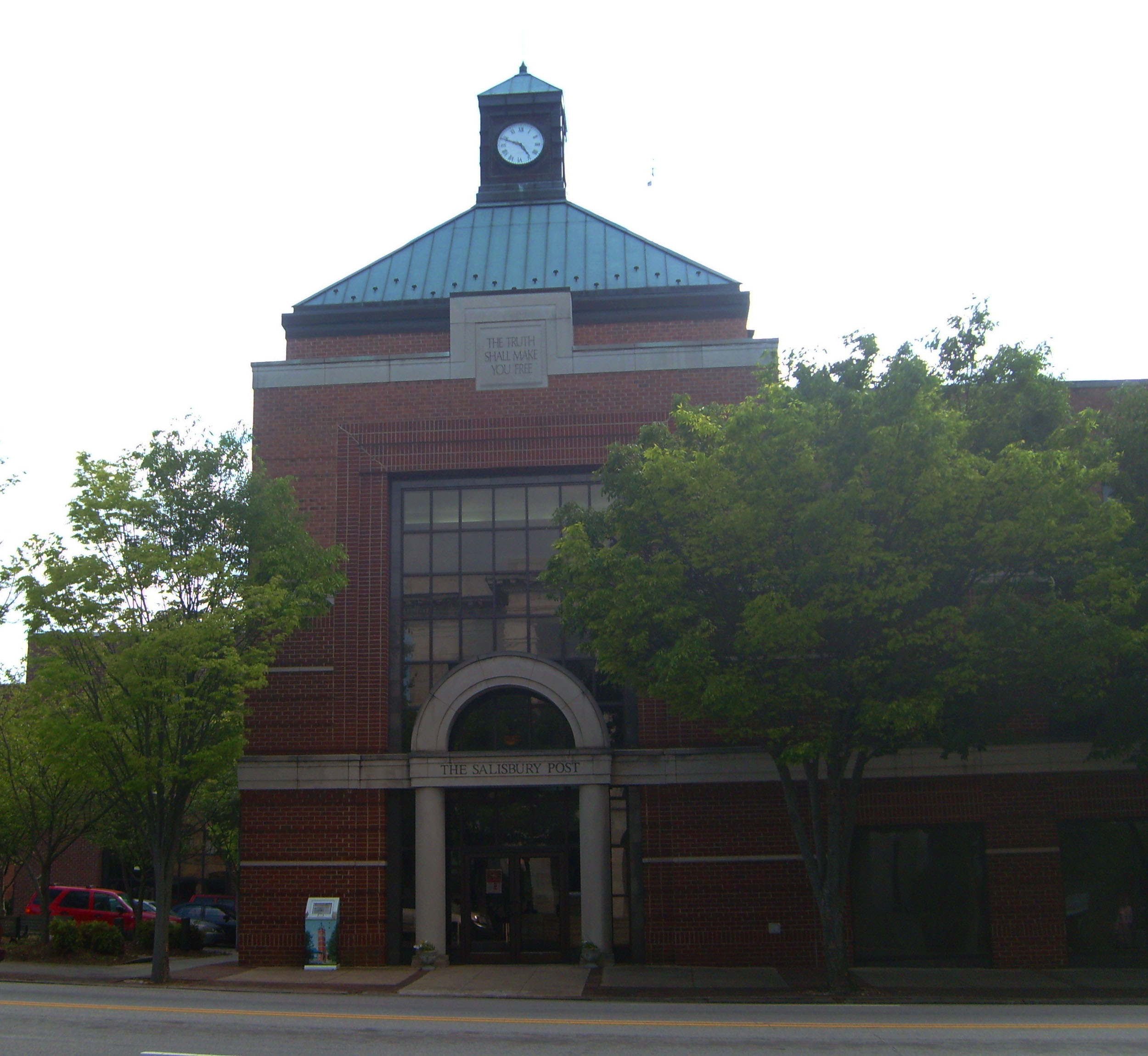
- Salisbury Post building.
- Type: Daily newspaper
- Format: Broadsheet
- Owner: Boone Newspapers
- Publisher: John Carr
- Editor: Chandler Inions
- Founded: 1905
- Language: American English
- Headquarters: 131 W. Innes Street; Salisbury, North Carolina 28144
- Circulation: 18,970 Daily; 19,417 Sunday (as of 2011)
- ISSN: 0747-0738
- OCLC number: 10534469
- Website: salisburypost.com

The Salisbury Post is an American, English-language daily newspaper, founded in 1905, in Salisbury, North Carolina that serves the city and other municipalities in Rowan County, as well as the county itself. The publisher of the Post is John Carr and its editor is Chandler Inions. The paper was known as the Salisbury Evening Post (1905–1984).

== History ==
The Salisbury Post debuted as The Salisbury Evening Post on January 9, 1905, and immediately proclaimed itself as "Salisbury's Leading Afternoon Newspaper."

J. B. Doub, E. C. Arey and Gabe M. Royal launched the newspaper at 114½ North Main Street, on the floor over G.A. Jackson's saloon. Joe X. Roueche and Clint N. Brown, former owners and publishers of the competing Salisbury Daily Sun, soon bought the Post and moved the operation across North Main Street to occupy the second floor of the old Meroney Opera House. A fire destroyed the Meroney Opera House on the morning of May 12, 1912, and took every vestige of equipment and record of the Post. But the newspaper kept publishing, as the editorial and mechanical staffs traveled to Spencer and used the office of A.W. Hicks, publisher of a small weekly.

Meanwhile, Roueche and Brown began negotiating the sale of the Post to a group of investors led by James Franklin Hurley, a former owner of The Concord Tribune. The change in ownership became official on July 22, 1912, and the Post moved back to Salisbury and began publication in the Shaver Building at 110 W. Innes St. Hurley served as both editor and publisher. He bought out most of the other original investors by 1919. The Post moved to its present location at 131 W. Innes St. in 1922. The Hurley family owned and operated the Salisbury Post until its sale to Evening Post Publishing Co. of Charleston, S.C., on January 31, 1997.

On February 19, 2014, the sale of the Salisbury Post to Salisbury Newsmedia LLC was completed. Salisbury Newsmedia is part of Northport, Alabama-based Boone Newspapers Inc.

The Salisbury Post began printing five days a week August 11, 2018. Starting April 30, 2019, printing was moved to Winston-Salem as a result of a partnership with BH Media. On April 12, 2020 the Post announced it would print a newspaper three days a week, with e-editions on Wednesday and Friday. Later that year, the Post agreed to sell its building, moving much of its operation to the first floor. On March 7, 2023, delivery to all subscribers by mail began. This meant a deadline of Friday at 7 P.M. for the Sunday paper, in order for delivery to take place on Saturday.

== Boone Newspapers ==
On February 19, 2014, the sale of the Salisbury Post to Salisbury Newsmedia LLC was completed. Salisbury Newsmedia is part of Alabama-based Boone Newspapers Inc.

== Salisbury the Magazine ==
The Salisbury Post also publishes Salisbury the Magazine, a perfect-bound, 84-page magazine with featured content of Salisbury and Rowan County. Maggie Blackwell is the editor.

== Staff ==
Editors who held the position the longest were Spencer Murphy (1936 to 1964) and Elizabeth Cook (1993 to 2018). Paris Goodnight became editor in March 2022.

Chandler Inions became editor in October 2023, replacing Elisabeth Strillacci, who retired.

== See also ==
- List of newspapers in North Carolina
