= Viễn Đông Daily News =

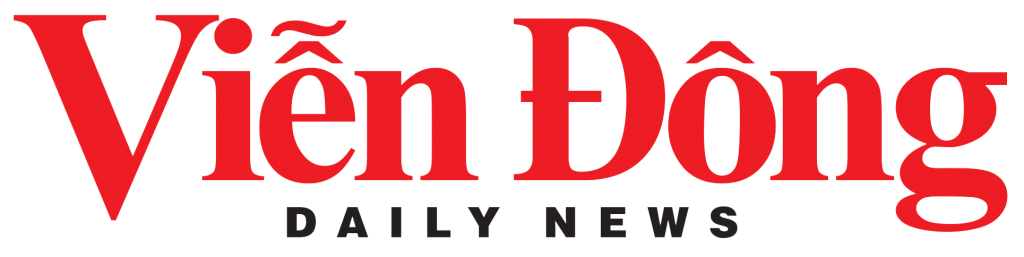
- Founded: 1993
- Language: Vietnamese
- Headquarters: Little Saigon, Westminster, California
- Country: United States
- Website: vien-dong.com

Viễn Đông Daily News (Vietnamese: Nhật báo Viễn Đông, lit. 'Far East Daily News') is one of the three largest Vietnamese-language newspapers published seven days a week by Vietnamese overseas.

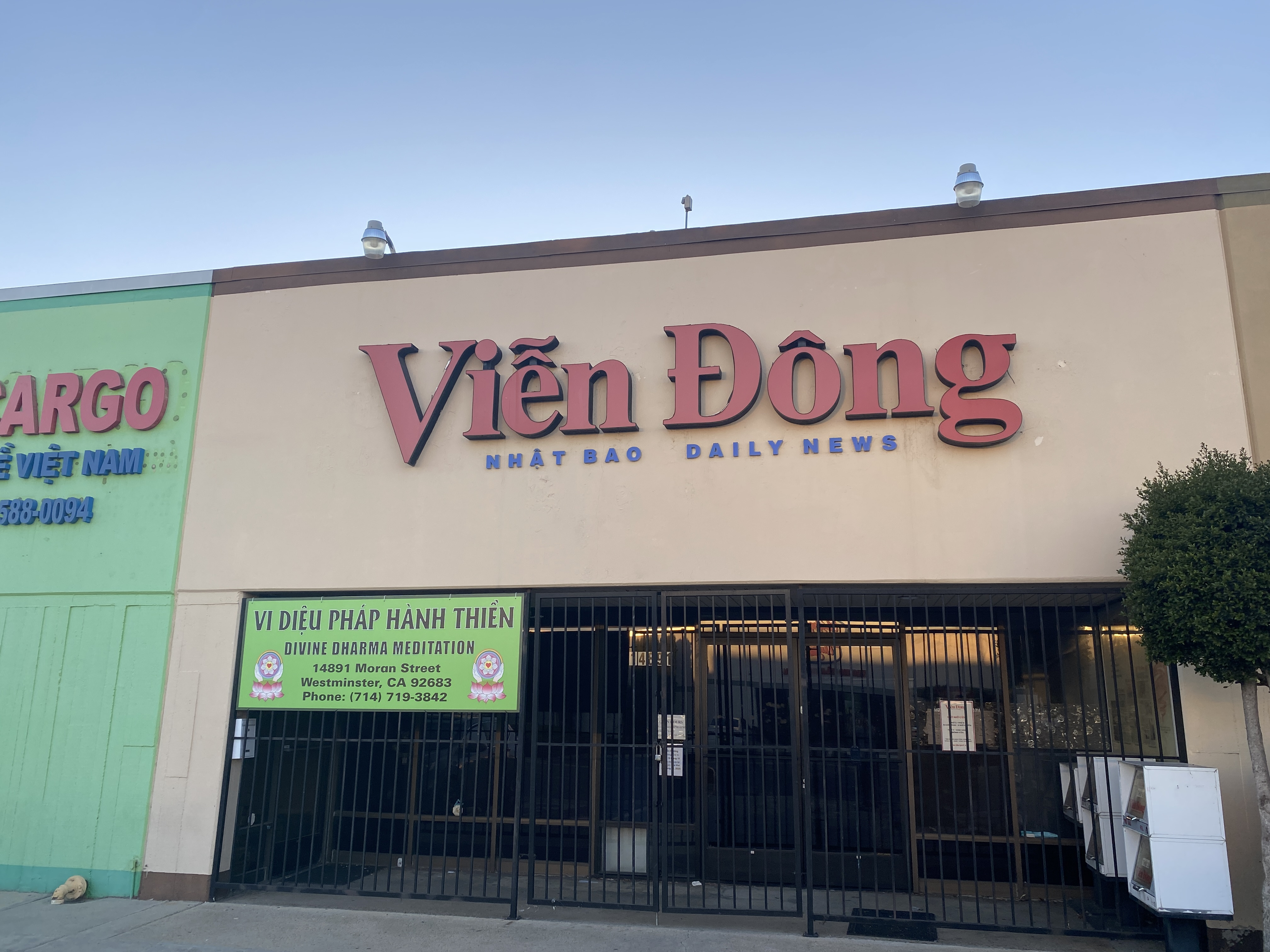
Office of Viễn Đông in Westminster, CA

Founded in 1993, its headquarters is situated in the Little Saigon neighborhood of Westminster, California. The newspaper's auditorium, Phòng hội Viễn Đông, is one of the oldest places hosting Vietnamese-American community and cultural events.
