= The Sand Mountain Reporter =

Sand Mountain Reporter
- Type: Thrice weekly newspaper
- Publisher: Kimberly Patterson
- Managing editor: Huck Treadwell
- Founded: August 1955
- Language: English
- Headquarters: Albertville, Alabama
- Circulation: 9,803 (as of 2013)
- Website: sandmountainreporter.com

The Sand Mountain Reporter is a newspaper serving Albertville, Alabama and the surrounding area. It is available in print and online.

== History ==
The Sand Mountain Reporter began as a five-day-a-week paper in 1954. The paper chose its name to signal that it served the Albertville area, not just Albertville proper. It was founded by the Courington family, who owned local radio station WAVU, and it was initially edited by Jesse Culp, a former director of agricultural reporting on that station, At its founding, it was noted by the Anniston Star for its "courage" in using new offset printing technology.

By 1964, citing rising costs of publishing, it had pared down to a twice-weekly publication schedule and merged with rival paper The Albertville Herald. By 1986, the paper was down to one news reporter and one sports staff, publishing three times a week under editor Randy Troup.

It was sold to Southern News Incorporated in 1999 by the Courington family.

According to the American Newspapers Representatives database it had a 2018 paid circulation of 9,803.
