= Weatherford Daily News =

- Type: Daily newspaper
- Format: Broadsheet
- Publisher: Phillip R. Reid
- Founded: 1929
- Headquarters: Weatherford, Oklahoma, United States
- Circulation: 6,500 (as of 2009)
- Website: wdnonline.com reidnewspapers.com

The Weatherford Daily News is a five-day daily newspaper published in Weatherford, Oklahoma. The newspaper is owned by Phillip and Jeanne Ann Reid, who also own the Vinita Daily Journal, the Perry Daily Journal, the Nowata Star, the OKC Tribune the Afton/Fairland American and the GrandLaker .

Southwestern Oklahoma State University graduate James Craddock purchased the Weatherford Democrat, the newspaper that he would rename the Weatherford Daily News in 1929. The Weatherford Democrat was established with the town in 1898. In order to expand it into a daily newspaper, Craddock enlisted the help of Kenneth Reid, who purchased the publication in 1972. Ken and Phyllis Reid's son, Phillip and wife Jeanne Ann Reid purchased the newspaper in 1994. The Weatherford Daily News is recognized as the legal newspaper of Weatherford, Oklahoma.
