= Leesville Daily Leader =

US newspaper

- Type: Daily newspaper
- Owner(s): Boone Newspapers
- Publisher: Joann Zollo
- Editor: Lauren Blankenship
- Founded: 1898, as The Leesville Leader
- Headquarters: 206 East Texas Street, Leesville, Louisiana 71446, United States
- Circulation: 1,759 Daily; 1,839 Sunday
- ISSN: 1069-3548
- Website: leesvilledailyleader.com

The Leesville Daily Leader is a daily newspaper published three days per week in Leesville, Louisiana, United States. It is owned by Boone Newspapers.

The paper covers the city of Leesville and Vernon Parish. It is published on Wednesdays, Fridays and Sundays.
