= Middlesboro Daily News =

Twice-weekly newspaper in Middlesboro, Kentucky, United States

- Type: Nearly-daily newspaper
- Format: Broadsheet
- Owner: Middlesboro-Tazewell Newsmedia LLC (Boone Newspapers)
- Publisher: Rita Haldeman
- Editor: Marisa Anders
- Founded: 1911
- Headquarters: Middlesboro, Kentucky, United States
- Circulation: 4,000
- ISSN: 1041-7095
- OCLC number: 14395566
- Website: middlesborodailynews.com

The Middlesboro Daily News is an American newspaper in Middlesboro, Kentucky and the newspaper's corresponding website. It circulates throughout Bell County, Kentucky. The newspaper is published two times a week, Wednesday and Saturday, except on major holidays.

== History and description ==
The Middlesboro Daily News was first printed in 1911. Its local owners sold it in 1970 to Worrell Newspapers, which sold it to The New York Times Co. in 1982. In 1990, the Times sold it and the Harlan Daily Enterprise to American Publishing Company, later renamed Hollinger International. It was later owned by Heartland Publications, which became part of Civitas Media. Civitas sold the Daily News and the Harlan Daily Enterprise to Boone Newspapers in 2017.

According to the Kentucky Press Association, The Middlesboro Daily News has a circulation of approximately 4,000.
