= Natchitoches Times =

Central Louisiana Newspaper

- Type: Newspaper
- Editor: Nora Drenner
- Founded: 1903
- Language: English
- Headquarters: 904 South Drive Natchitoches, LA 71458
- Website: natchitochestimes.com

The Natchitoches Times was first published on March 13, 1903, by Cunningham & Co. in Natchitoches, Louisiana. It was initially a daily newspaper (except Sundays and Mondays) starting January 27, 2004. The newspaper's first issue was the 50th anniversary edition, and it has been identified as "Independent."

== History ==
The publication's roots can be traced back to 1859 when Ernest Le Gendre, a French political exile, began publishing a bilingual newspaper, the Natchitoches Union. Upon Le Gendre's death in 1862, Louis Dupleix took over and renamed it the Natchitoches Times in 1864. The newspaper was later sold to Charles J. C. Puckette in 1868 and continued as the Weekly Natchitoches Times.
