= St. Landry Clarion =

Newspaper of St. Landry Parish, Louisiana, U.S.

The St. Landry Clarion was a newspaper of St. Landry Parish, Louisiana, established in 1890 in Opelousas, Louisiana, the parish seat. It was started as a four-page weekly. It continued until 1921, when it merged operations with the Star-Progress to form the Clarion-Progress. The newspaper's motto was "Here shall the press the people’s rights maintain, unawed by influence and unbribed by gain." It affiliated with the Democratic Party.

The paper was published in English and French. According to Newspapers.com the newspaper generated 9,438 searchable pages during 1890–1921.

Raymond Breaux was the editor for many years, and eventually the owner. His family was among prominent local citizens.
