= Tryon Daily Bulletin =

Newspaper in Tyron, North Carolina

- Type: Daily newspaper
- Owner: Boone Newspapers
- Publisher: Jeff Allison
- Founded: 1928
- Language: American English
- Headquarters: 16 North Trade Street; Tryon, North Carolina, U.S.
- Country: United States
- Circulation: 4,200
- OCLC number: 11921827
- Website: tryondailybulletin.com

Tryon Daily Bulletin is an American, English language daily newspaper based in Tryon, Polk County, North Carolina; it also serves parts of Spartanburg and Greenville counties in South Carolina.

== History ==
Known as "The World’s Smallest Daily Newspaper", it was established in 1928 by Seth Vining Sr. It had a readership of 4,250 in 2019 and its website had 30,000 visitors.

Jeff Byrd purchased the paper in 1989 and sold it in 2010 to Boone Newspapers Inc. of Tuscaloosa, Ala.

Its offices are housed in the Bank of Tryon Building, listed on the National Register of Historic Places in 2008.

The paper doesn't carry any wire stories; as its publisher, Jeff Byrd, said in 1993, "It's all local. It's a community paper. That's what people want here." It features columns from 15 local residents, reader photos, a large letters to the editor section and a community calendar.

== See also ==
- List of newspapers in North Carolina
