= Bogalusa Daily News =

Local newspaper in Bogalusa, Nevada

- The Newspaper That Cares About the People
- Front page nameplate

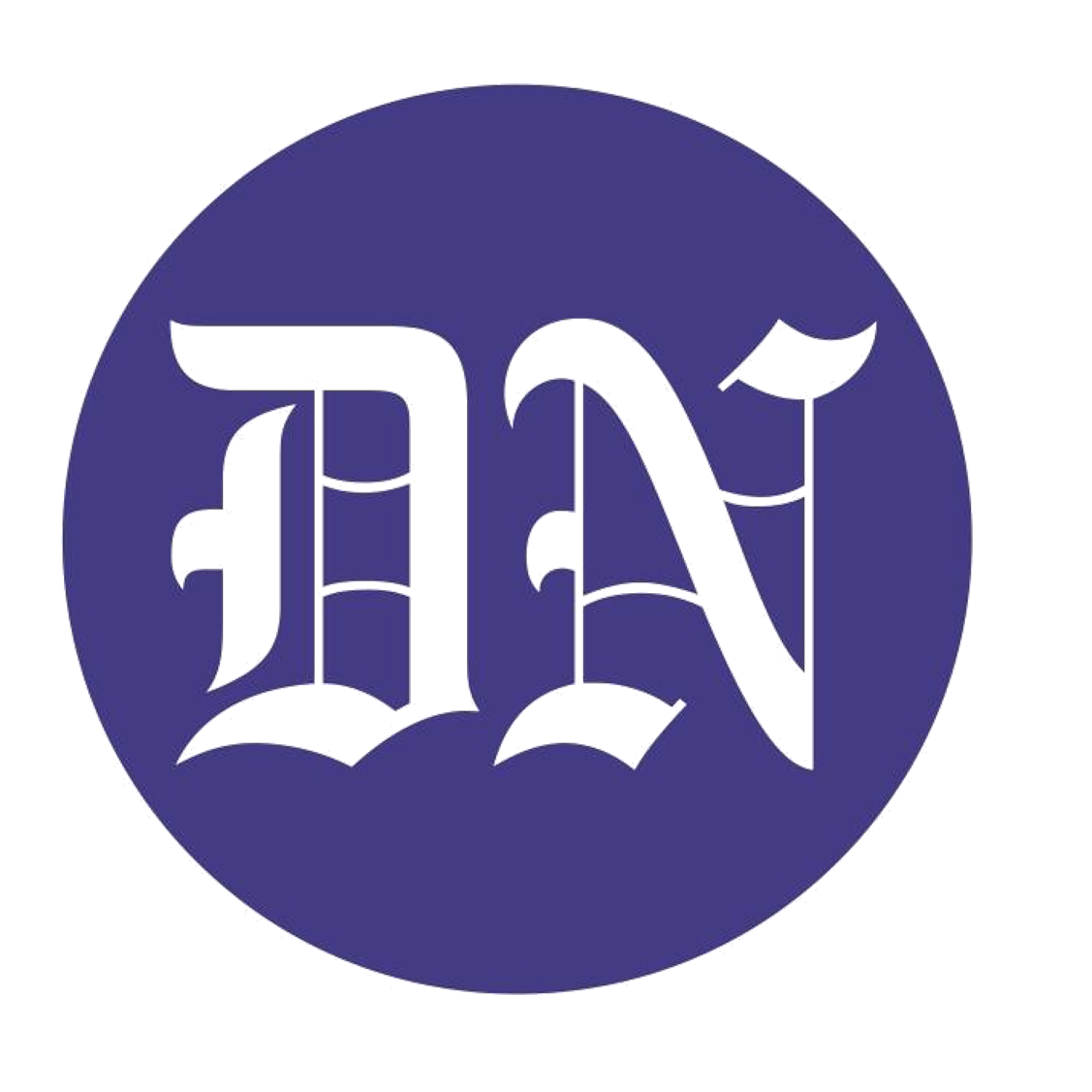
- Online logo
- Type: Community newspaper
- Format: Printed & online
- Owner: Carpenter Media Group
- Publisher: David Singleton (Regional)
- Staff writers: Carie Cleland, Kim Gerald, Randy Hammons, Rikki Hardy, Timothy Holdiness, Kim King, Chris Kinkaid, Jan Penton Miller, Alexander Moraski, Justin Schuver, Kevin Speakman, Kevin Warren, Jesse Wright
- Advertising director: Carol Case
- Founded: 1927; 99 years ago
- Language: English
- Headquarters: Physical address: 525 Avenue V Bogalusa, Louisiana 70427; Mailing address: P.O. Box 820 Bogalusa, Louisiana 70429
- Circulation: 6,500
- Sister newspapers: Picayune Item, Washington Parish Living
- OCLC number: 17463740
- Website: bogalusadailynews.com

The Bogalusa Daily Times, or simply The Daily News, is an American newspaper based in Bogalusa, Louisiana covering all of Washington Parish and northern St. Tammany Parish. Despite their name, it is now a weekly newspaper. During the Civil rights movement, the publication faced repeated acts of intimidation from the Ku Klux Klan.

== History ==
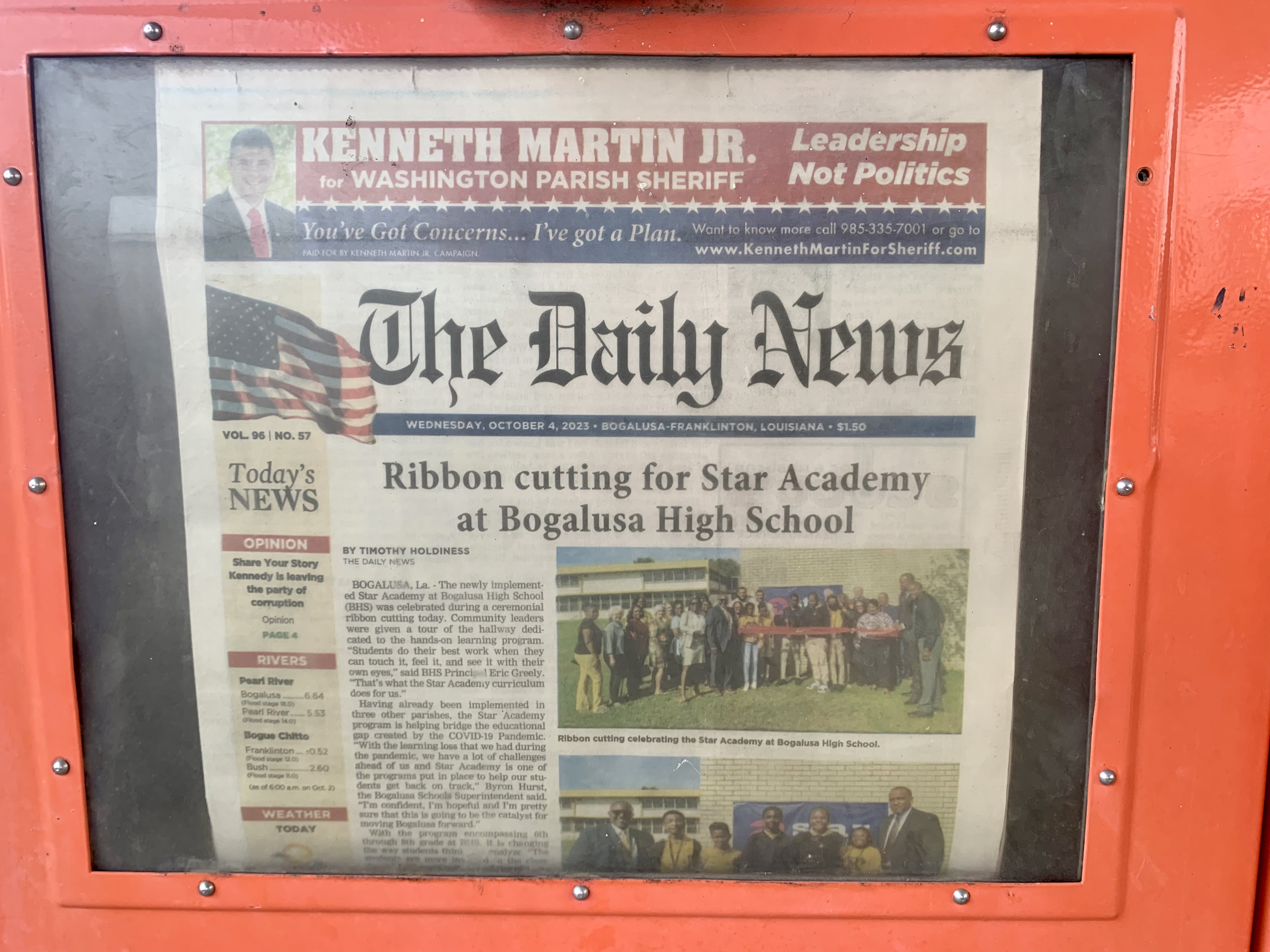
October 4, 2023, front page

The paper started in 1927 and, in the 1940s, Wick Communications purchased the publication. In 2013, Wick began closing their Louisiana newspapers. The next year, Wick sold both the Daily News and the LaPlace L'Observateur to the Carpenter Media Group, then a division of Boone Newspapers In 2023, the paper switched to a weekly format to reduce costs and focus on their website, but did not change their name.

=== Civil Rights era ===
In the 1960s, both the nonviolent Congress of Racial Equality (CORE) and the armed Deacons for Defense and Justice began pushing to end racial segregation in Bogalusa. The local Ku Klux Klan strongly opposed these efforts. That struggle turned violent leading to the killings of two African Americans, Oneal Moore and Clarence Triggs.

Under the leadership of editor Lou Major, the Daily News ran editorials against the secrecy of the Klan in 1964. The paper also stopped publishing their African-American edition and began providing the same version of their publication to all subscribers.

In response, the KKK began anonymously distributing the Midnight Mail, a racist newsletter, to compete with their coverage. The group then burned a cross at the downtown newspaper offices. On four occasions, the KKK also burned crosses at the home of editor who used one of them to roast marshmallows. In 2021, Major published an autobiography of his experiences running the paper despite the Klan.

== See also ==
- List of newspapers in Louisiana
- History of American newspapers
