= Monroe Free Press =

- Type: Weekly newspaper
- Owner(s): Wright's Publishing, Co.
- Founder(s): Roosevelt Wright, Jr.
- Founded: December 1969
- Headquarters: 507 N. 17th Street; Monroe, LA 71201
- Website: monroefreepress.com

The Monroe Free Press is a weekly African American newspaper in Monroe, Louisiana.

== History ==
The newspaper was founded in December 1969 by Roosevelt Wright, Jr. as a single sheet flier providing information on the Civil rights movement. It was originally called Rapping Black but the name was later changed to the Monroe Free Press.

== See also ==
- Monroe News Star — Monroe, Louisiana daily newspaper
- Ouachita Citizen — West Monroe, Louisiana weekly newspaper
