= Daily Mountain Eagle =

American daily newspaper based in Jasper, Alabama

- Type: Daily newspaper
- Format: Broadsheet
- Owner: Paxton Media Group
- Publisher: Rachael Raney
- Managing editor: Ed Howell
- Founded: 1872 (as Mountain Eagle)
- Language: English
- Headquarters: 100 Highway 78 West, Jasper, AL; United States
- ISSN: 0893-0759
- Website: mountaineagle.com

The Daily Mountain Eagle is a daily newspaper servicing the Jasper, Alabama area. The paper is owned by Paxton Media Group and operated locally. It is the closest daily newspaper that provides information to the locals in the immediate area, after The Birmingham News ceased publishing and converted to digital-only. While the newspaper focuses on local news, it also reports on national and international matters.

== History ==
The Daily Mountain Eagle was initially founded in 1872 under the name Mountain Eagle, and published weekly. J.F. Anthony bought a press in Tuscaloosa, Alabama. in 1872 to start a newspaper in Jasper, former editor Michael D. Anderson, Sr. said. Anthony was told “Man, you’re going to need an eagle to deliver newspapers in those mountains.” According to another former editor Skip Tucker, the name derived from a joke the mule driver who delivered its first press—that "only an eagle could deliver the news." In 1960, after a merger of The Walker County Times, The Jasper Advertiser, and The Mountain Eagle, the newspaper was renamed as the Daily Mountain Eagle and changed to daily publication.

Prior to March 2016, the Twitter handle "Dailymtneagle" operated as an anonymous impostor site, but the operator shut it down, reportedly to avoid being outed. He outed himself in a column soon after.

James Phillips, a native of Dora, Alabama and a 20 year news veteran, was named publisher of the Daily Mountain Eagle in April 2016.

The last edition of The Daily Mountain Eagle to be printed in the local pressroom in Jasper, Alabama was published on Friday September 16. 2022. After that edition, the printing of subsequent editions occur "off-site" at The Daily Corinthian facility in Corinth, Mississippi, which is also owned by Paxton. This move led to a significant reduction of employees at the local facility of the newspaper in Jasper, Alabama.

Beginning the week of December 29, 2025, The Daily Mountain Eagle began publishing the print edition on Wednesdays and Saturdays only, as news was being consumed online more than in physical print format.
