= Demopolis Times =

Daily newspaper in Demopolis, Alabama, US

- Type: Weekly newspaper
- Format: Broadsheet
- Owner(s): Jeff and Michelle Schumacher
- Publisher: Dennis Palmer
- Editor: Kendra Majors
- Founded: 1887
- Ceased publication: 2025
- Headquarters: 315 East Jefferson Street, Demopolis, AL 36732
- Circulation: 1,700
- Website: demopolistimes.com

The Demopolis Times was a daily newspaper serving Demopolis, Alabama from 1887 to 2025.

== History ==
The paper was formed out of two competing 19th century papers: the Demopolis Express (1893) and the Demopolis Dispatch (1897). In 1905, both papers were bought by a group of investors, and by 1910 E. S. Cornish had begun editing the paper and was part-owner. With a brief hiatus early in his career (during which the paper was edited by C. A. VerBeck), Cornish would be associated with the paper until his death in 1936. Under his leadership, the paper went to linotype printing 1919, at a cost of three thousand dollars. In 1930, he asked his son-in-law, Ben George, to move back to Marengo County to eventually run the times. At the time, George had no newspaper experience, and he began work there as a linotype editor

The paper was sold to George and his wife Elizabeth in 1936. In 1941, the newspaper building and plant were destroyed by fire, doing an estimated fifteen thousand dollars' worth of damage. In 1956, editor Ben George was elected president of the Alabama Press Association. He and Elizabeth sold the paper in 1967. Boone Newspapers bought the paper in 1979.

James Cannon was named publisher in 2008. In 2018, the paper won six awards from the Alabama Press Association including a second-place finish for best business story or column in its class.

In April 2025, Boone Newspapers sold the paper to Jeff and Michelle Schumacher. Two months later the couple closed the paper.
