= Beauregard Daily News =

Newspaper in Beauregard Parish, Louisiana

- Type: Daily newspaper
- Owner(s): Boone Newspapers
- Publisher: Clarice Touhey Joann Zollo
- Editor: Lauren Blankenship
- Founded: November 16, 1945, as Beauregard News
- Headquarters: 903 West First Street, DeRidder, Louisiana 70634, United States
- Circulation: 2,283 Daily; 2,418 Sunday
- OCLC number: 17430699
- Website: beauregarddailynews.net

The Beauregard Daily News is an American daily newspaper published in DeRidder, Louisiana. It is owned by Boone Newspapers.

The paper covers the city of DeRidder and Beauregard Parish, Louisiana, from which it takes its name.
