= The Davie County Enterprise-Record =

Newspaper in Davie County, North Carolina

Davie County Enterprise Record
- Type: Weekly newspaper
- Format: Broadsheet
- Owner(s): Boone Newspapers
- Editor: Mike Barnhardt
- Headquarters: 171 S. Main Street W. Mocksville, NC 27028; United States
- OCLC number: 13168632
- Website: ourdavie.com

The Davie County Enterprise-Record is a weekly newspaper based in Mocksville, North Carolina that serves Davie County, North Carolina. The editor of the paper is Mike Barnhardt. The Evening Post Publishing Company owned the paper from 1997 to 2014, when it was acquired by Boone Newspapers.

== Staff ==
Current staff includes Mike Barnhardt, Brian Pitts, and Ray Tutterow.

== See also ==
- List of newspapers published in North Carolina
