= Anadarko Daily News =

American newspaper

- Type: Daily newspaper
- Format: Broadsheet
- Owner: Family-owned
- Publisher: Joe McBride, Jr. (deceased)
- Editor: Carolyn McBride
- Language: English
- Headquarters: Anadarko, OK, U.S.
- Circulation: 4,800 (as of 2010)
- Website: anadarko-news.com

The Anadarko Daily News is the largest daily paper of Caddo County, Oklahoma and traces its heritage back to 1901. The paper is family-owned and its editor is Carolyn McBride. The paper was a merger of three papers purchased by Joe McBride Sr. in 1937. Its offices were destroyed by a fire in August 2009 and were earlier damaged by a tornado.
