= Southwest Daily News =

- Type: Tri-weekly newspaper
- Owner(s): Boone Newspapers
- Editor: Brian Trahan
- Founded: 1930, as The Sulphur Southwest Builder
- Headquarters: 714 East Napoleon Street, Sulphur, Louisiana 70663, United States
- Circulation: 1,075 Daily; 1,150 Sunday
- OCLC number: 20537500
- Website: sulphurdailynews.com

The Southwest Daily News is an American tri-weekly newspaper published Sundays, Wednesdays and Fridays in Sulphur, Louisiana. Previously owned by GateHouse Media, it was sold to the owners of the Lake Charles American Press in 2016. Boone Newspapers acquired the American Press and the Daily News in 2020.

The paper formerly published daily. It covers Sulphur and surrounding portions of Calcasieu Parish, Louisiana; it also owns three weekly newspapers covering other communities in the parish: The Moss Bluff News in Moss Bluff, the Vinton News in Vinton and The Westlake News in Westlake.
