= Boone Newspapers =

American newspaper publishing company

- Industry: Newspaper Publishing
- Key people: Steve Stewart, CEO; Catherine Boone Hadaway, Senior VP
- Website: boonenewsmedia.com

Boone Newspapers, Incorporated (BNI) is the parent company of a publishing business that includes dozens of newspapers as well as magazines, other published materials, and internet properties in the United States. It is a private company and owns papers in smaller cities in Alabama, Georgia, Kentucky, Louisiana, Tennessee, Texas, Michigan, Mississippi, Minnesota, North Carolina, Ohio and Virginia. The company is based in Tuscaloosa, Alabama.

== History ==
Founded by University of Alabama graduate Buford Boone (1909-1983), as of 2023 the company owned or managed 91 newspapers and other media products across Alabama, Georgia, Kentucky, Louisiana, Michigan, Minnesota, Mississippi, Virginia, North Carolina, Ohio, Tennessee and Texas.

After originally owning Tuscaloosa Newspapers Inc. under the guidance of Carmage Walls, Boone eventually took over the company and purchased additional papers. In 2014, Boone Newspapers bought several newspapers from Evening Post Industries.

Boone, the longtime editor and publisher who died of cancer in 1983, won a Pulitzer Prize in 1956 for an anti-segregation editorial in the Tuscaloosa News about the admission of the first Black student to the University of Alabama. The Encyclopedia of Alabama says he was "one of only a handful of white newspaper leaders in the South to take a moderate stance on civil rights, advocating a calm, level-headed acceptance of desegregation."

His son, James B. "Jim" Boone Jr. (1935-2023), created the media company that bears the family name. Long known as Boone Newspapers, Inc., it was renamed Boone Newsmedia in 2022 "to reflect its expansion into digital-centered media," the Associated Press reported.

After Jim Boone's death in February 2023, Boone Newsmedia announced in October that Todd H. Carpenter, its CEO since 2004, would be separating from the company with several properties that he had jointly owned under his Carpenter Newsmedia LLC company, including newspapers in Georgia, Louisiana, Kentucky, Mississippi, North Carolina, Tennessee, Texas and Virginia, and forming the Carpenter Media Group. Jim Boone's daughter, Catherine Boone Hadaway, was named senior vice president of Boone Newsmedia and Steve Stewart was named president and CEO. In June 2024, ownership was transferred amongst eight local media companies that had been jointly owned by Boone and Carpenter. BNI gained full control of The Tidewater News and Washington Daily News. CMI gained full control of The Post-Searchlight, The Daily Leader, Elizabethton Star, The State Journal, The Oxford Eagle and the Daily Bulletin. CMI also acquired the Ironton Tribune from Boone.

== Newspapers ==
Boone Newspapers include:

- Albert Lea Tribune
- Alexander City Outlook
- Andalusia Star News
- Argus-Press
- Atmore Advance
- Austin Daily Herald
- Beauregard Daily News
- Bogalusa Daily News
- The Brewton Standard
- Cassopolis Vigilant
- Claiborne Progress
- The Clanton Advertiser
- Clemmons Courier
- The (Kentucky) Daily News
- The Davie County Enterprise-Record
- Demopolis Times
- The (Brookhaven) Daily Leader
- The Demopolis Times
- The Dowagiac Daily News
- Edwardsburg Argus
- Elizabethton Star
- Franklin County Times
- The Greenville Advocate
- The Harlan Daily Enterprise
- Hartselle Enquirer
- The Interior Journal
- The Jessamine Journal
- LaGrange Daily News
- (LaPlace) L'Observateur
- Leesville Daily Leader
- The Lowndes Signal
- Luverne Journal
- The (Troy) Messenger
- Middlesboro Daily News
- The Natchez Democrat
- Niles Daily Star
- The Orange Leader
- The Oxford Eagle
- The Pelham Reporter
- Picayune Item
- The Port Arthur News
- Roanoke-Chowan News-Herald
- Salisbury Post
- Selma Times-Journal
- The Shelby County Reporter
- Southwest Daily News
- The (Frankfort) State Journal
- Suffolk News-Herald
- The Tallassee Tribune
- Tidewater News
- Tryon Daily Bulletin
- (Lanett) Valley Times-News
- The Vicksburg Post
- Washington Daily News
- Wetumpka Herald
- The Winchester Sun
