= Louisiana State Newspapers =

American newspaper publishing company

- Industry: Newspaper publishing
- Predecessor: Acadia Publishing Corp.
- Founded: 1963 in Rayne, Louisiana
- Founder: Braxton "B.I." Moody III
- Headquarters: Lafayette, Louisiana, United States
- Area served: Louisiana
- Parent: Paxton Media Group
- Website: louisianastatenewspapers.com

Louisiana State Newspapers, Inc. is a privately held chain of 23 local newspapers in the U.S. state of Louisiana, mostly in the Acadiana region. It is based in Lafayette and is the largest newspaper chain by number of publications in the state.

The chain began in 1963, when Braxton "B.I." Moody III purchased The Rayne Acadian-Tribune and The Church Point News for $100,000. The company was incorporated as Louisiana State Newspapers in 1973.

The company operates combined news websites in the parishes where it has more than one newspaper: Acadia Parish, Avoyelles Parish, Evangeline Parish, St. Mary Parish, and Vermilion Parish.

Moody died in 2023 at age 97. The Moody College of Business Administration and Moody Hall at the University of Louisiana at Lafayette are named after him. In 2026, the chain was acquired by Paxton Media Group.

== Newspapers ==
- Abbeville Meridional
- Acadian Press
- The Basile Weekly
- The Bayou-Pioneer
- The Bunkie Record
- The Caldwell Watchman
- The Church Point News
- The Crowley Post-Signal
- The Delhi Dispatch
- The Eunice News
- Gueydan Journal
- The Kaplan Herald
- The Kinder Courier News
- The Marksville Weekly News
- Morgan City Review
- St. Mary and Franklin Banner-Tribune
- The Oakdale Journal
- The Rayne Acadian-Tribune
- The Richland Beacon-News
- Teche News
- The Tensas Gazette
- The West Carroll Gazette
- Ville Platte Gazette
