= George P. Rowell =

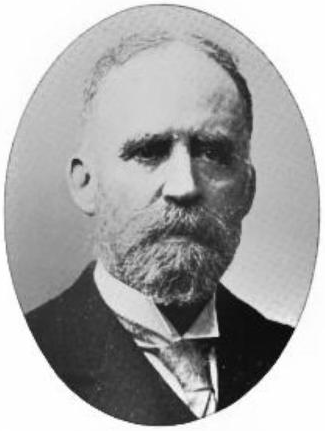
- Born: July 4, 1838; Concord, Vermont
- Died: August 28, 1908 (aged 70); Poland Spring, Maine
- Occupation(s): Advertising executive, publisher

George Presbury Rowell (July 4, 1838 - August 28, 1908) was an American advertising executive and publisher. He founded Printers' Ink, the first advertising trade magazine, in 1888.

== Life and career ==
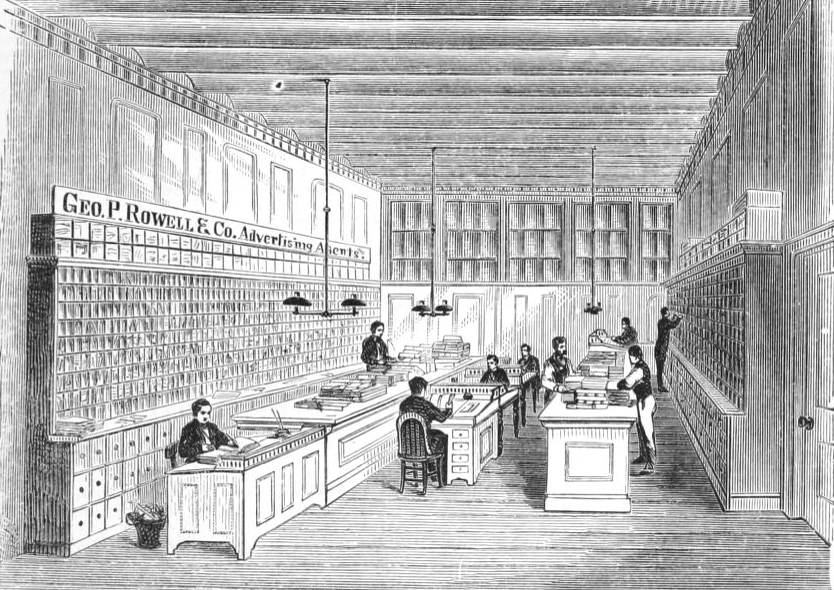
Office of Geo. P. Rowell, New York, 1860s

George P. Rowell was born in Concord, Vermont on July 4, 1838, and grew up in Lancaster, New Hampshire.

In the early 1860s, he opened an advertising agency in Boston. He offered advertising space in New England newspapers and eventually nationwide. In 1869, he issued the first Rowell's American Newspaper Directory listing 5,778 American papers. Eventually, he opened an office on the ground floor of the New York Times building.

Rowell died in Poland Spring, Maine.
