= The New Orleans Bee =

Newspaper in New Orleans

The New Orleans Bee L’Abeille de la Nouvelle-Orléans
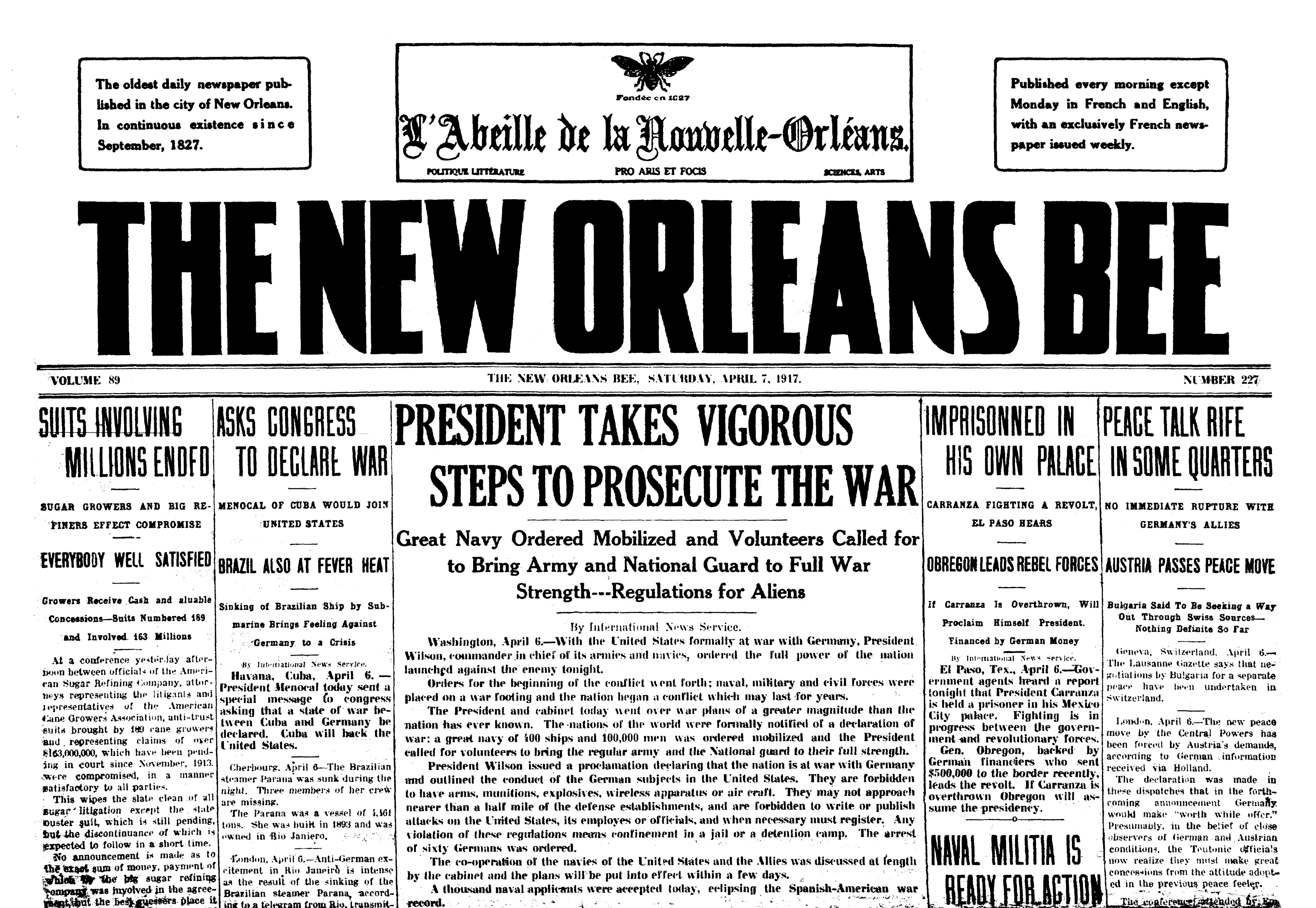
- The April 7, 1917, front page reporting the U.S. entry into World War I
- Type: Daily newspaper
- Format: Broadsheet
- Founded: September 1, 1827
- Ceased publication: December 27, 1923
- Language: French, English, Spanish
- Headquarters: New Orleans, Louisiana, U.S.

The New Orleans Bee (French: L’Abeille de la Nouvelle-Orléans) was an American broadsheet newspaper in New Orleans, Louisiana, founded on September 1, 1827, by François Delaup and originally located at 94 St. Peter Street, between Royal and Bourbon. The newspaper ceased publication on December 27, 1923.

== Publication ==
Initially published three times a week in French, an English-language section was added on November 24, 1827, and in this form it was the most successful of New Orleans daily newspapers in the middle of the nineteenth century. The English section was abandoned in 1872 because of increased competition from English-language newspapers but later restored. A Spanish-language section (Abeja) was published in 1829–1830.

Until at least 1897 L'Abeille remained "almost certainly the daily newspaper of choice" for French officials in New Orleans. The title was purchased in 1921 by The Times-Picayune and was published weekly until it closed in 1923. It was by some accounts the last French-language newspaper in New Orleans, ceasing publication on December 27, 1923, after ninety-six years; others assert that it was outlasted by Le Courrier de la Nouvelle Orleans, which continued until 1955.

== See also ==
- List of newspapers in Louisiana
- Literature of Louisiana
- List of French-language newspapers published in the United States
