= Alexander City Outlook =

Weekly newspaper published in Alexander City, Alabama

- Type: Twice-weekly newspaper
- Format: Broadsheet
- Owner(s): Boone Newspapers
- Founder(s): Capt. J.D. Dickson
- Publisher: Steve Baker
- Editor: Kaitlin Fleming
- Founded: 1892
- Language: English
- Headquarters: Alexander City, Alabama
- Circulation: 2,050
- ISSN: 0738-5110
- OCLC number: 9612603
- Website: alexcityoutlook.com

The Alexander City Outlook is a twice weekly newspaper publication in eastern Alabama. The Outlook has been in constant publication since it was founded in 1892 by Capt. J.D. Dickson. It has a circulation of about 2,050 copies and is owned by Tallapoosa Publishers, Inc. It publishes Tuesday-Saturday in Alexander City, Alabama.

== History ==
In 1946 it was sold to publisher J. C. Henderson by Benjamin Russell's estate.

In 1972, it went from weekly to daily publication.

Boone Newspapers purchased the paper in 1974.

In 1989, Kenneth Boone, son of the owner of Boone Newspapers, became the publisher of the Outlook, later purchasing it for himself in 1991.

On July 2, 2018, Alexander City Outlook editor Mitch Sneed died as a result of injuries sustained in an automobile accident. In his tenure at the Outlook, Sneed had won multiple awards from the Alabama Press Association for feature stories, news coverage, and photography. The current editor is Kaitlin Fleming.
