= List of newspapers in North Carolina =

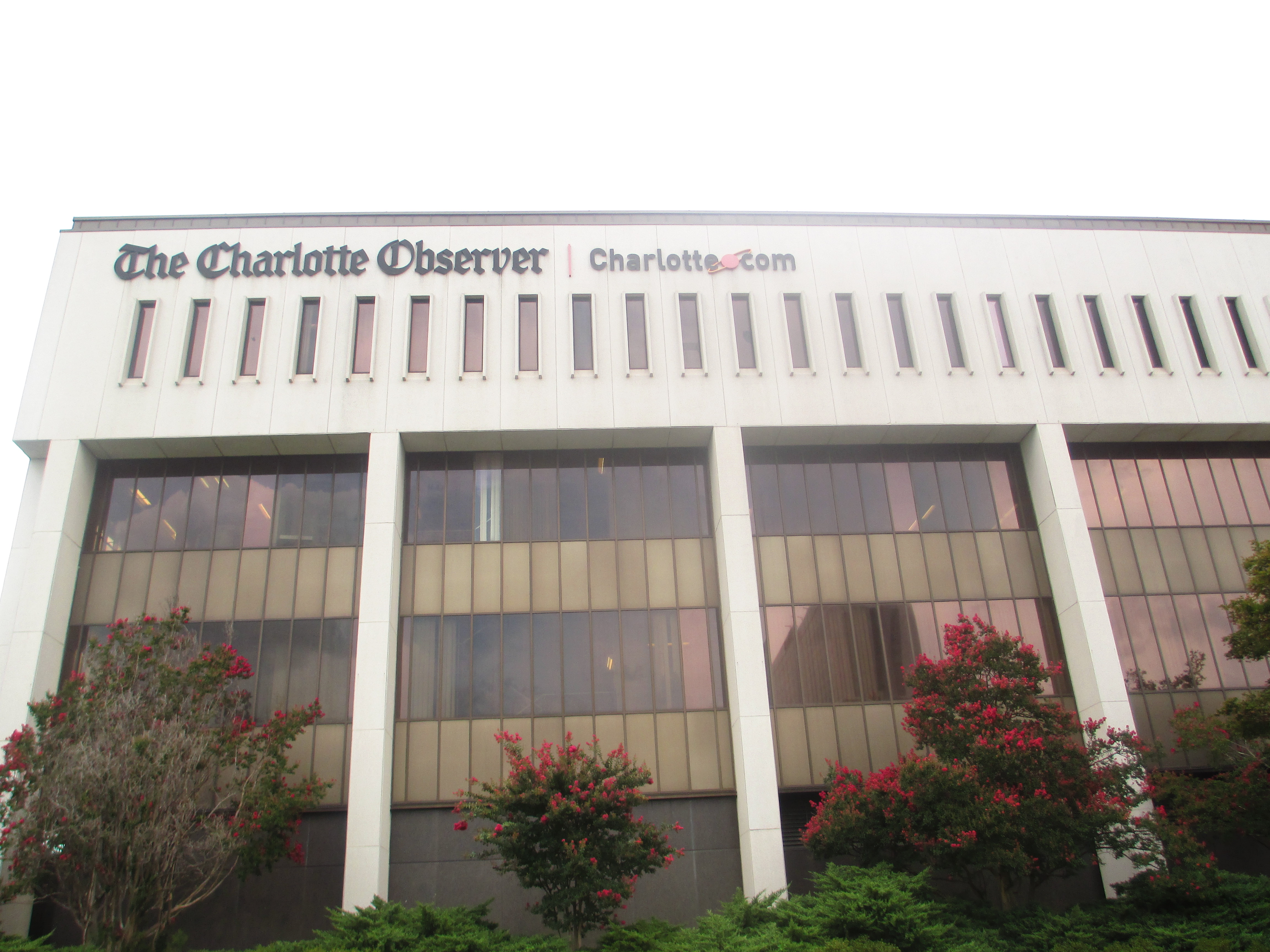
The Charlotte Observer

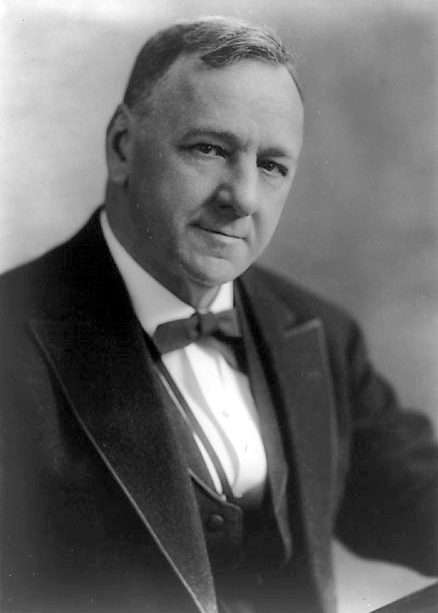
Josephus Daniels, the principal shaper of the Raleigh News & Observer

There have been newspapers in North Carolina since the North-Carolina Gazette began publication in the Province of North Carolina in 1751. As of January 2020, there were approximately 260 newspapers in publication in North Carolina. While printed newspaper circulation has declined in the last 10 years, the total paid print circulation of newspapers in North Carolina is over 4 million. The newspapers with the largest paid circulation are The Charlotte Observer and The News & Observer of Raleigh. The largest number of North Carolina newspapers are focused on local news at the county level. In addition to print versions of North Carolina newspapers, most newspapers have online websites, as well as Facebook and Twitter accounts for distribution of news media and interacting with their community.

== List of newspapers ==
Oldest newspaper in North Carolina

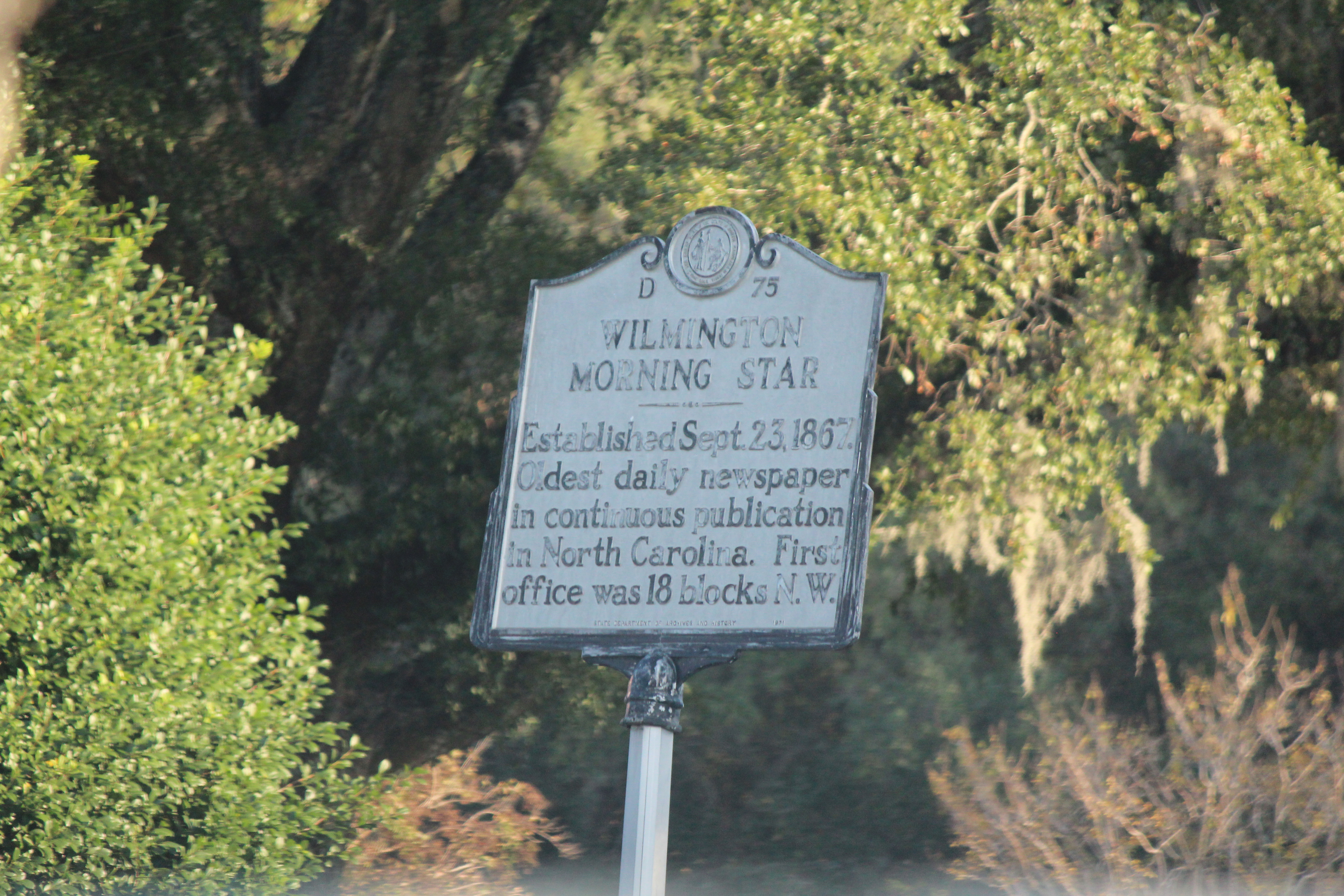
Wilmington Star News historic marker

There were approximately 260 North Carolina newspapers in publication at the beginning of 2020. The Fayetteville Observer (established in 1816) is the oldest newspaper in North Carolina. The Star-News of Wilmington (established in 1867) is the oldest continuously running newspaper. Many of the newspapers in North Carolina have common parent companies, including Adams Publishing Group, Boone Newspapers, Champion Media, Community News Holdings, Inc. (CNHI), Gannett, Lee Enterprises, and McClatchy. Many of the newspapers are also members of the North Carolina Publishing Association. Print frequency varies from daily to monthly. Most newspapers use Facebook and Twitter for distribution of content. Most college and universities in North Carolina have student newspapers. There is one Chinese (The China Press Weekly) and three Spanish language newspapers, La Conexión being the oldest in North Carolina.

=== Daily newspapers ===
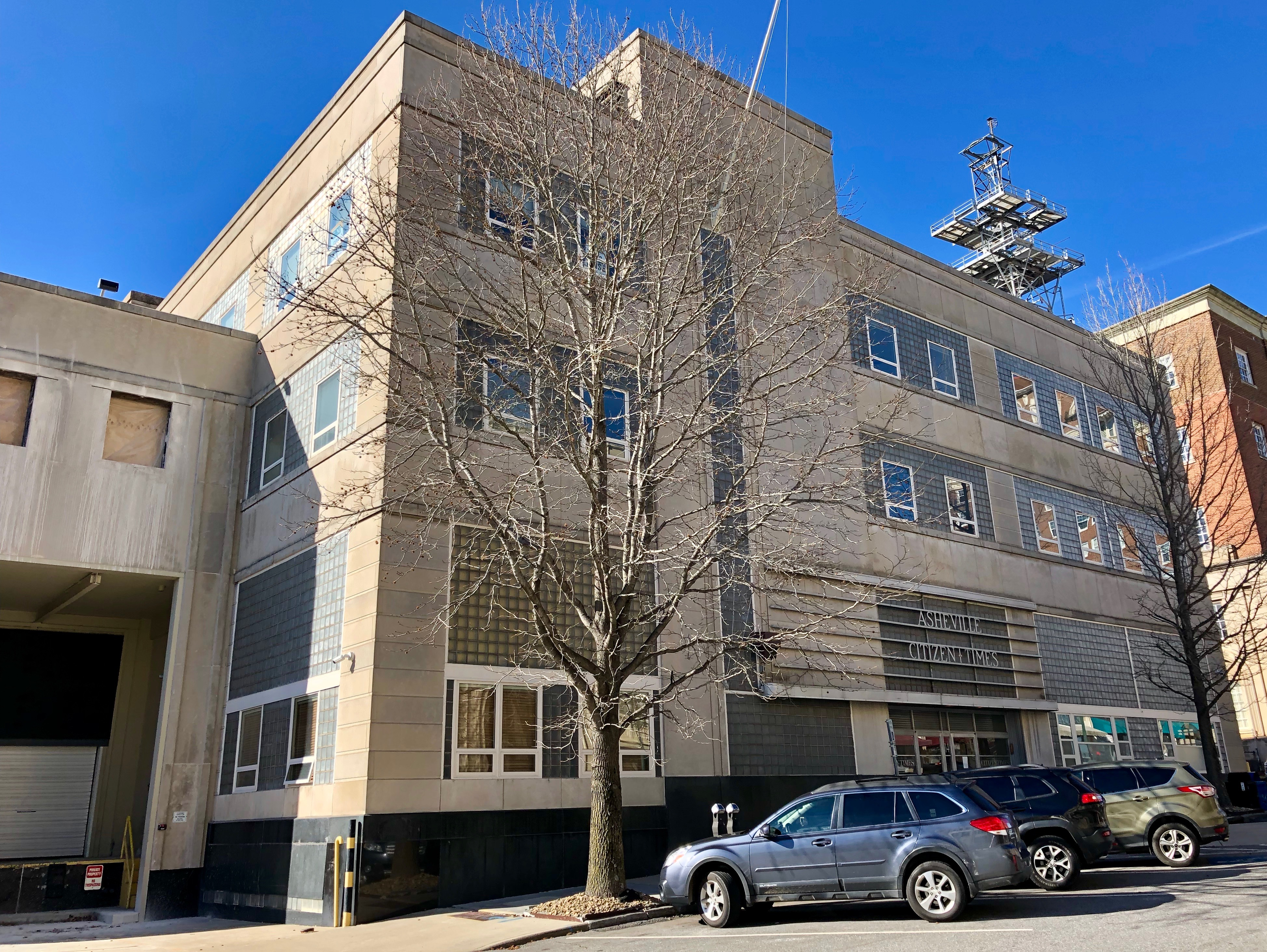
Former Asheville Citizen Times building

There are 45 North Carolina newspapers that are published in print editions at least five days a week, as of the beginning of 2019.

Current daily newspapers in North Carolina
Title	City	County	Year established	Current Print Frequency	Parent Company or Publisher	References
Asheville Citizen-Times	Asheville	Buncombe	1870	Daily	USA Today Co.	
Charlotte Observer	Charlotte	Mecklenburg	1886	Daily	McClatchy	
Courier-Tribune, The	Asheboro	Randolph	1876	Daily	Paxton Media Group	
Daily Courier, The	Forest City	Rutherford	1969	Daily (Tue. thru Sat.)	Paxton Media Group, Ron Paris	
Daily Dispatch, The	Henderson	Vance	1914	Daily	Paxton Media Group	
Daily Herald, The	Roanoke Rapids	Halifax	1914	Daily	Paxton Media Group	
Daily Record, The	Dunn	Harnett	1950	In print Tuesdays & Fridays; online daily	Record Publishing Company	
Daily Reflector, The	Greenville	Pitt	1882	Daily	Adams Publishing Group	
Dispatch, The	Lexington	Davidson	1902	Daily	Paxton Media Group	
Daily Advance, The	Elizabeth City	Pasquotank/ Camden	1911	Daily	Adams Publishing Group	
The Daily News	Jacksonville	Onslow	1953	Daily	USA Today Co.	(Note: Before 1954, the Jacksonville Daily News was known as the Jacksonville Daily News and Views (1952), News and Views (1946–1952))
Fayetteville Observer, The	Fayetteville	Cumberland	1816	Daily	USA Today Co.	
Free Press, The (Note: The Free Press was preceded by the Kinston Daily Free Press (1923–1991), Daily Free Press (1902–1923), and Kinston Free Press (1882–1923).)	Kinston	Lenoir	1882	Daily (except Sat.)	Paxton Media Group	
Gaston Gazette, The	Gastonia	Gaston	1880	Daily	USA Today Co.	
Goldsboro News-Argus, The	Goldsboro	Wayne	1885	Daily	Paxton Media Group	
Herald-Sun, The (Note: The Herald-Sun was formerly The Durham Morning Herald and The Durham Sun.)	Durham	Durham, Wake	1853	Daily	McClatchy	
Hickory Daily Record	Hickory	Catawba/ Burke/ Caldwell	1915	Daily	Lee Enterprises	
High Country Press	Boone	Watauga	2005	Daily	Ken Ketchie	
High Point Enterprise	High Point	Guilford/ Davidson/ Randolph/ Forsyth	1885	Daily	Paxton Media Group	
Laurinburg Exchange, The	Laurinburg	Scotland	1882	Daily	Champion Media	
McDowell News, The	Marion	McDowell	1923	Daily	Lee Enterprises	
Mecklenburg Times, The	Charlotte	Mecklenburg	1923	Daily	BridgeTower Media	
Mount Airy News, The	Mount Airy	Surry	1880	Daily (except Sat.)	Adams Publishing Group	
News & Observer, The (Note: The News & Observer was in publication as Daily News in 1872. It became the News and Observer in 1880. The News & Observer was previously known as The Sentinel and Chapel Hill News.)	Raleigh	Wake/ Durham	1865	Daily	McClatchy	
News & Record (Note: The News & Record was formerly the Greensboro News & Record.)	Greensboro	Guilford	1890	Daily	Lee Enterprises	
News Herald, The	Morganton	Burke	1899	Daily	Lee Enterprises	
News-Topic (Note: The News-Topic was descended from Lenoir News and Lenoir Topic.)	Lenoir	Caldwell	1875	Daily (Tue. thru Fri., Sun.)	Paxton Media Group	
Observer-News-Enterprise, The	Newton	Catawba	1955	Daily	Horizon Publications	
Richmond County Daily Journal (Note: The Richmond County Daily Journal was preceded by the Richmond County Journal (1931–1966).)	Rockingham	Richmond	1931	Daily	Champion Media	
Robesonian, The	Lumberton	Robeson	1870	Daily	Champion Media	
Rocky Mount Telegram	Rocky Mount	Edgecombe/ Nash	1995	Daily	Adams Publishing Group	
Salisbury Post	Salisbury	Rowan	1905	Daily(except Mon., Sat.; no print edition on Wed., Fri.)	Boone Newspapers	
Sampson Independent, The	Clinton	Sampson	1924	Daily	Champion Media (Note: Mrs. E.F. McCulloch and Jessie Lee Sugg McCulloch were associate editors of the Sampson Independent until 1952.)	
Sanford Herald, The	Sanford	Lee	1930	Daily (Tue. thru Sat.)	Paxton Media Group	
Star, The (Note: The Star was preceded by The Shelby Star (1984–1998) and the Shelby Daily Star (1936–1984).)	Shelby	Cleveland	1894	Daily	USA Today Co. (Note: GateHouse Media became part of Gannett in 2019.)	
Star-News, The	Wilmington	New Hanover	1867	Daily	USA Today Co.	
Statesville Record & Landmark	Statesville	Iredell	1874	Daily	Lee Enterprises	
Sun Journal	New Bern	Craven	1876	Daily	Paxton Media Group	
Times-News	Hendersonville	Henderson	1881	Daily	USA Today Co.	
Times-News, The	Burlington	Alamance/ Guilford	1887	Daily	Paxton Media Group	
Tryon Daily Bulletin	Tryon	Polk	1928	Daily	Boone Newspapers	
Washington Daily News	Washington	Beaufort	1909	Daily	Boone Newspapers	
Wilson Times, The	Wilson	Wilson	1896	Daily (except Sun.)	Restoration Newsmedia	
Winston-Salem Journal	Winston-Salem	Forsyth	1897	Daily	Lee Enterprises	

=== College newspapers ===
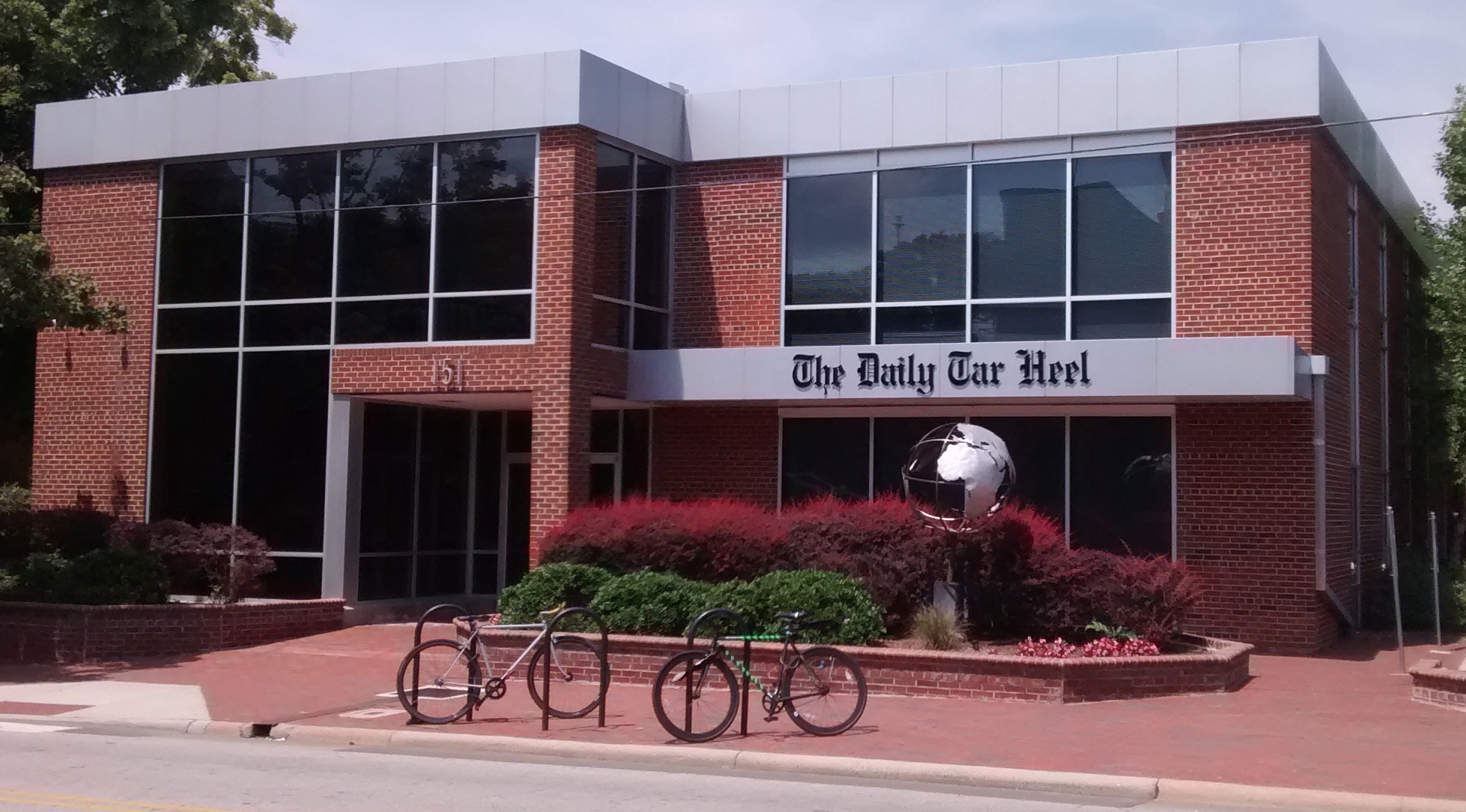
The Daily Tar Heel office

There are 24 North Carolina college newspapers that are published during the academic year.

Current North Carolina college newspapers
Title	City	County	Year established	Current Print Frequency	College	References
A & T Register	Greensboro	Guilford	1894		North Carolina A&T University	
Appalachian, The	Boone	Watauga	1934	Weekly	Appalachian State University	
Bennett Banner, The	Greensboro	Guilford	193?	Semi-Monthly	Bennett College for Women	
Black Ink: Black Student Movement	Chapel Hill	Orange	1969	Varies	University of North Carolina at Chapel Hill (Black Student Movement)	
Blue Banner, The	Asheville	Buncombe	1984	Weekly	University of North Carolina at Asheville	
Campbell Times, The (Creek Pebbles)	Buies Creek	Harnett	1926	Weekly	Campbell University	
Campus Echo	Durham	Wake	1927		North Carolina Central University	
Chronicle, The	Durham	Durham	1905	Mon. thru Fri.	Duke University	
Clarion, The	Brevard	Transylvania			Brevard College	
Collegiate, The	Wilson	Wilson	1927	Weekly	Barton College	
Daily Tar Heel, The	Chapel Hill	Chatham/ Durham/ Orange	1893	Daily	University of North Carolina at Chapel Hill, DTH Media Corporation	
Davidsonian, The	Davidson	Mecklenburg	1914	Weekly	Davidson College	
East Carolinian, The	Greenville	Pitt	1925	Tue., Thurs.	East Carolina University	
Guilfordian, The	Greensboro	Guilford	1914	Weekly	Guilford College	
News Argus, The	Winston-Salem	Forsyth	1962		Winston-Salem State University	
Niner Times, The	Charlotte	Mecklenburg	1946		University of North Carolina at Charlotte	
Old Gold & Black	Winston-Salem	Forsyth	1916	Weekly (Thurs.)	Wake Forest University	
Pen, The	Raleigh	Wake			St. Augustine's University	
Pendulum, The	Elon	Alamance			Elon University	
Seahawk, The	Wilmington	New Hanover	1948	Weekly	University of North Carolina at Wilmington	
Technician	Raleigh	Wake	1920	Weekly (Thurs.)	North Carolina State University	
Voice, The	Fayetteville	Cumberland	1946		Fayetteville State University	
WCC Campus Voice, The	Goldsboro	Wayne	1988	Unknown	Wayne Community College	

=== Special interest newspapers ===
Currently, there are 15 special interest newspapers in North Carolina covering religious, Native American, African-American, LGBT, and military perspectives on the news.

Current special interest newspapers in North Carolina
Title	Interest area	City	County	Year established	Current Print Frequency	Parent Company or Publisher	References
Biblical Recorder	Baptist	Raleigh	Wake/ Durham	1833	bi-weekly	Baptist State Convention of North Carolina	
Carolina Indian Voice, The	Native-Americans	Pembroke	Robeson	1973	Weekly	Lumbee Pub. Co.	
Carolina Peacemaker	African-Americans	Greensboro	Guilford	1967	unknown	Carolina Newspapers	
Catholic News Herald	Catholics	Charlotte	Mecklenburg	1991	Bi-weekly (Fri.)	Roman Catholic Diocese of Charlotte	
Charlotte Jewish News	Jewish	Charlotte	Mecklenburg	1979	Unknown	Jewish Federation of Greater Charlotte, The	
Charlotte Post, The	African-Americans	Charlotte	Mecklenburg	1878	Weekly	The Charlotte Post Publishing Company	
Cherokee One Feather	Native Americans	Cherokee	Swain	1968	Weekly	Tribal Council of the Eastern Band of Cherokee Indians	
Fayetteville Press, The	Afro-American	Fayetteville	Cumberland	1989	Monthly	J.J. Jones	
Globe, The	U.S. Military	Camp Lejeune	Onslow	1944	Weekly	Consolidated Public Affairs Office	
Q-Notes	LGBT	Charlotte	Mecklenburg	1986	Monthly	QCQ	
Scope, The	U.S. Military	Goldsboro	Wayne	19??	Weekly	Seymour Johnson AFB	
Triangle Tribune, The	African-American	Durham	Durham	1998	Weekly	The Charlotte Post Publishing Company	
Wilmington Journal	African-Americans	Wilmington	New Hanover	1996	Weekly	Wilmington Journal Co.	
Windsock, The	Military	Cherry Point	Craven	1948	Weekly	Air FMFLant, and 2nd M.A.W.	
Winston-Salem Chronicle	African-Americans	Winston-Salem	Forsyth	1974	Weekly, Thurs.	The Winston-Salem Chronicle Publishing Co.	

=== Foreign language newspapers ===
Currently, there are seven North Carolina newspapers published in languages other than English.

Current foreign language newspapers in North Carolina
Title	Language	City	County	Year established	Current Print Frequency	Parent Company or Publisher	References
Qiao bao zhou mo: Bei ka Nan ka ban (The China Press Weekly)	Chinese	Raleigh	Wake	2013	Weekly		
Enlace Latino NC (website)	Spanish	Charlotte, Greensboro, Winston-Salem, Raleigh	Mecklenburg, Guilford, Forsyth, Wake	2002	digital		
Acento Latino	Spanish	Fayetteville	Cumberland	1999		Fayetteville Publishing Company	
La Conexión (Note: La Conexión was the first Spanish language newspaper in North Carolina.)	Spanish	Raleigh	Wake/ Durham	1995	Weekly	Velasquez Communications Corporation	
Greensboro Latino	Spanish	Greensboro	Guilford	2021		Benbassat Digital Consultants	
Qué Pasa	Spanish	Charlotte, Greensboro, Winston-Salem, Raleigh	Mecklenburg, Guilford, Forsyth, Wake	2002		Qué Pasa Media Network	
Progreso Hispano News							

=== Other newspapers ===
Currently, there are 174 North Carolina newspapers not covered by the above categories, including weekly and monthly print publication frequencies.

Other current newspapers in North Carolina
Title	City	County	Year established	Current Print Frequency	Parent Company or Publisher	References
Asheville Daily Planet	Asheville	Buncombe	2004	Bi-weekly	Star Fleet Communications, LLC	
AC Phoenix, The	Winston-Salem	Forsyth	1982	Monthly	unknown	
Alamance News, The	Graham	Alamance	1875	Weekly	News, Inc.	
Alleghany News, The (Note: In the 1930s, the Alleghany Star merged with Alleghany Times and became the Alleghany News.)	Sparta	Alleghany	1889	Weekly	Alleghany Holdings, LLC	
Anson Record, The	Wadesboro	Anson	1881	Weekly	Champion Media	
Archdale Trinity News, The	Archdale	Randolph	1978	Weekly	Melinda Lamb	
Ashe Post & Times (Note: The Jefferson Post merged with the Ashe Post & Times in 2017.)	West Jefferson	Ashe	1925	Semi-Weekly (Tues., Fri)	Adams Publishing Group	
Asheville Advocate	Asheville	Buncombe	1987	Bi-Weekly	C & A Enterprises	
Asheville Tribune	Asheville	Buncombe				
Avery Journal-Times	Newland	Avery	1959	Weekly	Adams Publishing Group	
Banner News	Belmont	Gaston	1995	Weekly	Republic Newspapers, Inc.	
Belmont Banner, The	Belmont	Gaston	19??	Weekly	B. Arp Lowrance	
Bertie Ledger-Advance	Windsor	Bertie	1930	Weekly	Adams Publishing Group, Parker Bros.	
Bessemer City Record	Kings Mountain, Bessemer City	Cleveland, Gaston	1989	Weekly	Republic Newspapers, Inc.	
Biltmore Beacon	Asheville	Buncombe		weekly	Mountaineer Publishing Company	
Black Mountain News	Black Mountain	Buncombe	1945	Weekly	Thomas Claybaugh	
Bladen Journal, The	Elizabethtown	Bladen	1898	bi-weekly	Champion Media	
Blowing Rocket, The	Blowing Rock	Watauga/ Caldwell	1932	Weekly, Thurs.	Adams Publishing Group	
Blue Ridge Sun, The	Sparta	Alleghany	1979	Weekly	Milly B. Richardson, Kathy Wagner	
Brunswick Beacon	Shallotte	Brunswick	1962	Weekly	Landmark Media Enterprises	
Bulletin, The	Ramseur	Randolph	1994	Weekly	Randolph Pub. Co.	
Butner-Creedmoor News, The	Creedmoor	Granville	1965	Weekly	Restoration Newsmedia	
Caldwell Informer	Granite Falls	Caldwell	198?	Weekly	David C. Hollar	
Carolina Journal	Raleigh	Wake	1991	Monthly	John Locke Foundation	
Carolinian, The	Raleigh	Wake	1920 or 1940	Semi-Weekly	Unknown	
Carteret County News-Times	Morehead City	Carteret		M, W, Su	Walter Phillips and Lockwood Phillips	
Cary News, The	Cary	Wake	196?	Semi-Weekly	Sample Pub. Co.	
Caswell Citizen, The	Yanceyville	Caswell	198?	Weekly	CHN Communications Corp.	
Caswell Messenger, The	Yanceyville	Caswell	before 1945	weekly	Womack Publishing Company	
Caswell News & Notes	Yanceyville	Caswell	2025	Online	Shannon Moretz	
Chapel Hill News, The	Chapel Hill	Orange	1992	Semi-Weekly	Robert W. Parks	
Charlotte Weekly Uptown, The	Charlotte	Mecklenburg	19??	Weekly	Weekly Newspapers, Inc.	
Chatham Journal	Siler City	Chatham	1996			
Chatham News, The	Siler City	Chatham	1924	Weekly	North State Media	
Chatham Record, The	Pittsboro	Chatham	1878	weekly	North State Media	
Cherokee Scout	Murphy	Cherokee	1889	Weekly (Wed.)	Paxton Media Group	
Chowan Herald, The	Edenton	Chowan	1934	Weekly	Adams Publishing Group	
Clay County Progress	Hayesville	Clay	1951	Weekly, Thurs.	Paxton Media Group	
Cleveland County Journal, The	Lawndale	Cleveland	198?	Weekly	Steve Howard Martin	
Cleveland Times, The	Shelby	Cleveland	1941	Weekly	Cleveland Times Co.	
Coastland Times, The	Manteo	Dare	1973	Tue, Thurs., Sun.	Times Print. Co.	
County Compass, The	Bayboro	Pamlico	2009	Weekly, Thurs.		
County News, The	Statesville	Iredell	1997	Weekly	M. McCullough	
Courier-Times, The	Roxboro	Person	1943	Weekly	Roxboro Newsmedia	
Creative Loafing	Charlotte	Mecklenburg	1987	Weekly	unknown	
Crossroads Chronicle	Cashiers	Jackson			CNHI	
Dispatch	Raleigh	Wake	1991	Weekly	Carolinian Pub. Co.	
Danbury Reporter, The	Danbury	Stokes	189?	Weekly	unknown	
Davie County Enterprise-Record, The	Mocksville	Davie	1899	Weekly	Boone Newspapers	
Denton Orator, The	Denton	Davidson	1995	Weekly	unknown	
Duplin Times Progress Sentinel	Kenansville	Duplin	1963	Weekly	Adams Publishing Group, Duplin Pub. Co.	
Eagle, The	Cherryville	Gaston	190?	Weekly	Eagle Pub. Co.	
East Carolina Reminder, The	Columbia	Tyrrell	1982	Weekly	Columbia Print. Co.	
Eden Daily News	Eden	Rockingham	2002	Bi-weekly	Lee Enterprises	
Enquirer-Journal, The	Monroe	Union	1975	Semi-Weekly (Tue, Thurs., Sat.)	Enquirer Pub. Co.	
Enterprise, The	Spring Hope	Nash	2018	Weekly	Unknown	
Farmville Enterprise, The	Farmville	Pitt	1910	Weekly	Adams Publishing Group, A.C. Monk	
Four Oaks News, The	Four Oaks	Johnston	1973	Weekly	Hockaday Print. Co.	
Franklin Press, The	Franklin	Macon	1886	Weekly	Paxton Media Group	
Franklin Times, The	Louisburg	Franklin	1870	Weekly	James A. Thomas	
Fuquay-Varina Independent	Fuquay-Varina	Wake	1994	Weekly	Kirkland Newspapers, Inc.	
Gates County Index	Gatesville	Gates	193?	Weekly	Parker Bros.	
Graham Star, The	Robbinsville	Graham	1855	Weekly	Paxton Media Group	
Greensboro Patriot, The	Greensboro	Guilford	200?	Weekly	Patriot Pub. Co.	
Grey Area News	Zebulon	Wake, Eastern North Carolina	2011		Frank Whatley	
Hatteras Monitor	FriscoMessenger,	Dare	1986	Monthly	Richard Jones	
Havelock News	Havelock	Craven		Weekly	GateHouse Media	
Havelock Progress, The	Havelock	Craven	19??	Weekly	Havelock Progress Pub. Co.	
Havelock Times, The	Havelock	Craven	1995	Weekly	Carteret Pub. Co.	
Highlander, The	Highlands	Macon/ Jackson	1958	Weekly	Paxton Media Group	
Independent, The	Robbinsville	Graham	1991	Weekly	G. Russell Wiggins	
Independent Tribune (Note: The Concord Tribune and the Daily Independent newspapers merged in 1996 to form the Independent Tribune. The newspapers have served the area since 1883.)	Concord	Cabarrus	1883	3 days a week	Lee Enterprises	
Indy Week	Durham	Durham/ Wake	1983	Weekly	ZM INDY, Inc.	
Island Free Press	Hatteras, Ocracoke	Dare, Hyde	2007		Donna Barnett	
Island Gazette	Carolina Beach	New Hanover	1978	Weekly	Seaside Press Co.	
Jamestown News	Jamestown	Guilford	1978	Weekly	Womack Newspapers, Inc.	
Johnstonian-Sun, The	Selma	Johnston	192?	Weekly	Sun Pub. Co.	
Jones Post, The	Trenton	Jones	197?	Weekly	Ashley B. Futrell, Jr.	
Kannapolis Citizen	Kannapolis	Cabarrus/ Rowan	2003 (ceased print publication by 2010)	Facebook only	Salisbury Post	
Kernersville News	Kernersville	Forsyth	19??	Weekly	Fred P. Carter	
Kenly News	Kenly	Johnston	1973	Weekly	Lawrence Newspapers, Inc.	
Kings Mountain Herald	Kings Mountain	Cleveland	1979	Weekly	General Pub. Co.	
Knightdale Times	Zebulon	Wake	1999	Weekly	Gold Leaf Pub., Inc.	
Lake Gaston Gazette-Observer	Littleton	Warren	1955	Weekly (Wed.)	Womack Publishing Company	
Lake Norman Times	Denver	Lincoln	1993	Weekly	Womack Pub. Co.	
Leader, The	Research Triangle Park	Orange	1979	Weekly	Capitol Publications	
Liberty News, The	Liberty	Randolph	1950	Weekly	L.T. James	
Lincoln Times-News (Note: The Lincoln Times-News arose from the Lincoln News, established in 1873, and Lincoln Times, established in 1907. The two newspapers were merged to form the Lincoln times-News in 1965.)	Lincolnton	Lincoln	1873	Semi-Weekly (Mon., Wed., Fri.)		
Littleton Observer, The	Littleton	Warren	1955	Weekly	Ruth Mincher	
M' Voice, The	Greenville	Pitt	1987	Weekly	Jim Rouse & Sons	
Macon County News	Franklin	Macon	1980s		Gooder	
Martin County Enterprise & Weekly Herald	Williamston	Martin	2012	Semi-Weekly (Tue., Fri.)	Adams Publishing Group, Cooke Communications	
Mebane Enterprise	Mebane	Alamance/ Orange	1908		Womack Publishing Company	
Mecklenburg Gazette, The	Davidson	Mecklenburg	19??	Weekly	W. Taylor Blackwell	
Messenger, The	Madison	Rockingham	1943	Semi-Weekly	Madison Pub. Co.	
Mitchell News-Journal	Spruce Pine	Mitchell			Paxton Media Group	
Montgomery Herald	Troy	Montgomery	19??	Weekly	Charlie Manning	
Mooresville Tribune	Mooresville	Rowan	1940	Weekly	Lee Enterprises	
Mount Olive Tribune	Mount Olive	Wayne/ Duplin		Weekly	Restoration Newsmedia	
Mountain Times	Boone	Watauga	1978	Weekly, Thurs.	Adams Publishing Group	
Mountain Xpress	Asheville	Buncombe		Weekly		
Mountaineer, The	Waynesville	Haywood		Semi-Weekly (Mon., Wed., Fri.)		
Nashville Graphic, The	Nashville	Edgecombe	1988	Semi-Weekly (Wed., Fri.)	Graphic Publications	
News-Herald, The	Ahoskie	Hertford	19??	Tri-weekly	Park Newspapers of Northeastern North Carolina, Inc.	
News-Journal, The	Raeford	Hoke	1929	Weekly	Paul Dickson	
News of Orange County, The	Hillsborough	Orange		Weekly	Womack Publishing Company	
News-Record, The	Marshall	Madison	1911	Weekly	Western Carolina Print. Co.	
News Reporter, The	Whiteville	Columbus	1905	Semi-Weekly	Columbus County Trucker's Reporter Co.	
North Carolina Gazette	Charlotte	Mecklenburg				
North Carolina Telegraph	Goldsboro	Wayne	1850	Weekly	W.F.S. Alston & F.C. Patrick	
North Meck Newspaper	Charlotte	Mecklenburg	1978	Weekly	Stan Kaplan	
North State Journal	Raleigh	Statewide	2016		North State Media, LLC	
Ocracoke Observer	Ocracoke	Hyde	1999	Daily online coverage; Monthly print edition March–December	Self-published	
Oxford Public Ledger	Oxford	Granville	1919	Weekly	Ledger Pub. Co.	
Pamlico Scoop, The	Washington	Beaufort	1989	Monthly	Friends Publishers	
Pamlico News, The	Bayboro	Beaufort, Pamlico	1968/1977	Weekly	Henry Winfrey	
Paraglide, The	Raeford	Cumberland	1973	Weekly	Dickson Press	
Pender-Topsail Post & Voice (Note: The Pender-Topsail Post & Voice was formed in mergers of Pender Post, Pender Chronicle, and Topsail Voice.)	Hamstead	Pender	1991	Weekly	Carteret Publishing Co, Inc.	
Perquimans Weekly, The	Hertford	Perquimans	1934	Weekly	Adams Publishing Group	
Pilot, The	Vass	Moore	1920	Semi-Weekly	Pilot Print. Co.	
Pilot, The	Pilot Mountain	Surry		Weekly	Adams Publishing Group, Civitas Media Group, Champion Media	
Princeton News Leader	Princeton	Johnston	1983	Weekly	Merrill Pub. Co.	
Proclamation, The	Burlington	Alamance	2006	Bi-Monthly	MEJ Consulting Enterprises, Inc.	
Randleman Reporter	Randleman	Randolph	1986	Weekly	Womack Pub. Co.	
Randolph Guide, The	Asheboro	Randolph	1954	Weekly	Paul G. Cutrigh	
Rant, The	Sanford	Lee	2008	Monthly	LPH Media LLC	
Reidsville Review, The	Reidsville	Rockingham	1888	Bi-Weekly	Lee Enterprises	
Richlands-Beulaville Advertiser News	Richlands	Duplin	197?	Weekly	Duplin-Onslow Pub. Co.	
Roanoke-Chowan News-Herald	Ahoskie	Hertford	1914	Semi-Weekly (Wed., Sat.)	Boone Newspapers, Inc.	
Roanoke Beacon, The	Plymouth	Washington	1959	Weekly	Roanoke Beacon, Inc.	
Robco News	Lumberton	Robeson	1984	Semi-Weekly	Robco News, Inc.	
Rockingham Now	Reidsville	Rockingham	2019	Semi-Weekly	unknown	
Smithfield Herald, The	Smithfield	Johnston	188?	Semi-Weekly (Tue., Fri.)	Samuel Booker	
Smoky Mountain News	Waynesville	Haywood		Weekly (Wed.)	Smoky Mountain News Inc.	
Smoky Mountain Times	Bryson City	Swain	1883	Weekly	Paxton Media Group	
Spectrum	Jacksonville	Onslow	1984	Weekly	Shopco Pub. Co.	
St. Pauls Review, The	St. Pauls	Robeson	192?	Weekly	Community Media	
Standard, The (Note: The Standard may include the Farmville Enterprise, Standard Laconic, and The Times Leader newspapers, according to its Facebook page.)	Snow Hill	Greene, Pitt		Weekly	Adams Publishing Group	
Stanly News and Press, The	Albemarle	Stanly	1880	Tue., Thurs., Sun.	Community Newspaper Holdings, Inc. (CNHI)	
State Port Pilot, The	Southport	Brunswick	1928			
Stokes News, The (Note: The Stokes News was proceeded by the Danbury Reporter in 1872, The King Times in 1961, Pilot Mountain News, and the Kings Times.)	King	Stokes/ Forsyth	1872	Weekly	Adams Publishing Group	
Sylva Herald and Ruralite, The	Sylva	Jackson	1926			
Tabor-Loris Tribune	Tabor City	Columbus	1991	Weekly	Atlantic Pub. and Paper Co.	
Tarboro Weekly	Tarboro	Edgecombe	2014	Weekly (Wed.)	Adams Publishing Group	
Taylorsville Times (Note: The Taylorsville Times began as Alexander County Journal, then Taylorsville Index, then Taylorsville news, then Mountain Scout, and finally Taylorsville Times)	Taylorsville	Alexander	1886	Weekly	Lee & Jane Sharpe	
Thomasville Times, The	Thomasville	Davidson	1989	Tri-weekly	High Point Enterprise, Inc.	
Tideland News	Swansboro	Onslow	1979	Weekly	Double H Co.	
Times-Leader, The	Grifton	Pitt	1994	Weekly	Mitchell Oakley	
Topsail Times, The	Surf City	Onslow, Pender	2021	Bi-Weekly	None	
Transylvania Times, The	Brevard	Transylvania	1887	Semi-Weekly	Times Pub. Co.	
Triad City Beat	Greensboro, Winston-Salem, High Point	Guilford, Forsyth, Guilford	2014	Weekly, Thurs.	Brian Clarey	
Tribune, The	Elkin, Jonesville	Wilkes, Surry, Yadkin	1911	Weekly	Adams Publishing Group	
Wake Weekly, The	Wake Forest	Franklin/ Wake	1947	Weekly (Thurs)	Restoration Newsmedia	
Wallace Enterprise, The	Wallace	Duplin	192?	Semi-Weekly (Mon., Thurs.)	Wells-Oswald Pub. Co.	
Warsaw-Faison News, The	Warsaw	Duplin	195?	Weekly	H.L. Oswald, III	
Warren Record, The	Warrenton	Warren	1896	Weekly (Wed.)	Womack Publishing Company	
Watauga Democrat	Boone	Watauga	1888	Semi-Weekly (Wed., Sun.)	Adams Publishing Group	
Wayne-Wilson News Leader	Fremont	Wayne	1983	Weekly	Merrill Pub. Co.	
Wayne Week	Goldsboro	Wayne	2023	Weekly (Sun.)	New Old North Media	
Weekly Post, The	Locust	Stanly	1974	Weekly	Weekly Post, Inc.	
West Craven Highlights	Vanceboro	Craven	1978	Weekly	unknown	
Wilkes Journal-Patriot	North Wilkesboro	Wilkes	1906	Tue., Fri.	Carter-Hubbard Publishing	
Yadkin Ripple, The	Yadkinville	Yadkin	1892	Weekly, Thurs.	Adams Publishing Group	
Yes! Weekly	Greensboro	Guilford	2005	Weekly	Womack Newspapers	

Notes:

Facebook News Sites: Most newspapers now have official Facebook pages that contain news articles and allow consumers to post comments about the news. The About tab on these pages often contains information about the establishment of the newspaper, location of the headquarters, ownership, staff, and links.

== Statewide news organizations ==
The North Carolina Press Association (NCPA) was formed in 1873. It supports newspapers, readership and advertisers throughout the state. Membership includes 155 of the North Carolina newspapers, as of 2020.

The North Carolina Press Foundation was formed in 1995. It is a non-profit organization supporting journalists.

== See also ==
- List of radio stations in North Carolina
- List of television stations in North Carolina
- List of African-American newspapers in North Carolina (current and defunct)
- Category:Journalists from North Carolina
- University of North Carolina School of Media and Journalism, Chapel Hill
- North Carolina literature

North Carolina media by city or county:

- Asheville
- Boone
- Carteret County
- Charlotte
- Durham
- Eden
- Fayetteville
- Greensboro
- High Point
- Morehead City
- Raleigh
- Statesville
- Wilmington
- Wilson
- Winston-Salem
U.S. newspapers

Comprehensive

- Lists of newspapers
- List of newspapers in the United States

Frequency

- List of free daily newspapers in the United States
- List of weekly newspapers in the United States

Circulation

- List of international newspapers originating in the United States
- List of national newspapers in the United States
- List of newspapers in the United States by circulation

Foreign language

- List of French-language newspapers published in the United States
- List of German-language newspapers published in the United States
- List of Spanish-language newspapers published in the United States

Specialty

- List of African-American newspapers in the United States
- List of alternative weekly newspapers in the United States
- List of business newspapers in the United States
- List of family-owned newspapers in the United States
- List of Jewish newspapers in the United States
- List of LGBTQ periodicals in the United States
- List of student newspapers in the United States
- List of supermarket tabloids in the United States
- List of underground press in the United States

Other

- List of defunct newspapers of the United States

== Bibliography ==
- Mammen, Edwin H. (2006). "North Carolina Newspapers". In Powell, William S. (ed.). Encyclopedia of North Carolina. University of North Carolina Press.
- "North Carolina Newspaper Publishing Has Developed Into Important State Industry". E.S.C. Quarterly. 9. North Carolina Employment Security Commission. Winter–Spring 1951 – via North Carolina Digital Collections.
- "News: Newspapers: Regional: United States: North Carolina". DMOZ. AOL. (Directory ceased in 2017)
- "North Carolina Newspapers". Historical U.S. Newspapers Online. Library Guides. Ohio: Bowling Green State University. "Newspapers that are freely available on the Internet"
- "Southeast". Historical African American Newspapers Available Online. Subject Guides. Poughkeepsie, NY: Marist College Library. (Includes North Carolina newspapers)
- International Coalition on Newspapers. "Newspaper Digitization Projects: United States: North Carolina". Chicago: Center for Research Libraries.
- UNC's Wilson Special Collections Library. "North Carolina Digital NC, Newspapers". digitalnc.org.
