= Daily Record =

The Daily Record refers to the following newspapers:

== Australia ==
- Daily Record (Rockhampton), a newspaper published in Rockhampton, Queensland

== United Kingdom ==
- Daily Record (Scotland), a Scottish tabloid based in Glasgow

== United States ==
- The Boston Record, a former daily newspaper published in Boston, Massachusetts
- Cañon City Daily Record, a daily newspaper in Cañon City, Colorado
- Daily Record (Arkansas), published in Little Rock
- Daily Record (Maryland), a daily business and legal newspaper published in Baltimore, Maryland
- Daily Record (New Jersey), a daily newspaper published in Morris County, New Jersey
- The Daily Record (North Carolina), a daily newspaper published in Dunn, North Carolina
- The Daily Record (Ohio), a daily newspaper published in Wooster, Ohio
- Daily Record (Washington), a daily newspaper published in Ellensburg, Washington
- Daily Record (Wilmington), an African American newspaper in Wilmington, North Carolina, that was destroyed by white supremacists during the Wilmington massacre in 1898
- Financial News & Daily Record, a daily financial newspaper published in Jacksonville, Florida
- Hickory Daily Record, a daily newspaper based in North Carolina
- Roswell Daily Record, a daily newspaper published in Roswell, New Mexico
- San Marcos Daily Record, a daily newspaper published in San Marcos, Texas
- York Daily Record, a daily newspaper published in York, Pennsylvania
