= Yes! Weekly =

Newspaper in Greensboro, North Carolina

YES! Weekly
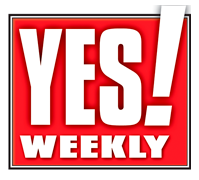
- Type: Alternative weekly
- Format: Tabloid
- Owner: Womack Newspapers Inc.
- Publisher: Charles A. Womack III
- Founded: 2005
- Language: English
- Headquarters: 5500 Adams Farm Lane; Suite 204; Greensboro, NC 27407; USA
- City: Greensboro, North Carolina
- Country: United States
- Website: yesweekly.com

Yes! Weekly (stylized YES! Weekly) is an alternative weekly newspaper based in Greensboro, North Carolina. It is published by Womack Newspapers Inc., which also publishes the Jamestown News, and which is owned by Charles A. Womack III. YES! Weekly serves the North Carolina cities of Greensboro, High Point and Winston-Salem. Its writers cover local topics such as news, politics, sports, music, culture, and opinion. They also distribute a regular calendar of local events and photos galleries of patrons of local nightlife. The paper is distributed on Wednesdays. YES! Weekly is a member of the North Carolina Press Association and the Association of Alternative Newsweeklies.

== See also ==
- Triad City Beat - another Triad alt-weekly newspaper
- Jamestown News - another weekly newspaper published by Womack Publishing Inc.
- List of newspapers published in North Carolina
