= Hickory Motor Speedway =

Motorsport track in the United States

- Location: 3130 Highway 70 SE; Newton, North Carolina; 28658
- Coordinates: 35°41′45″N 81°16′10″W
- Owner: Benny Yount (December 1986−present)
- Operator: Kevin Piercy
- Broke ground: December 27, 1951; 74 years ago
- Opened: May 18, 1952; 73 years ago
- Former names: Hickory Speedway (1952−1988)
- Major events: Current; ARCA Menards Series East; Cook Out 200 (2026); CARS Tour (1999–present); SMART Modified Tour (1990, 1995, 2006, 2011, 2021–present); Former: NASCAR Busch Series; Galaxy Food Centers 300 (1982–1998); The Pantry 300 (1982–1994); NASCAR Cup Series (1953–1971); NASCAR Southeast Series (1995–2004); NASCAR Grand National East Series (1972–1973); NASCAR Convertible Series (1956–1959)
- Website: hickorymotorspeedway.com

Remeasured Paved Oval (1970–present)
- Surface: Asphalt
- Length: 0.363 mi (0.584 km)
- Turns: 4
- Race lap record: 0:15.272 ( (United States) Max Reaves, Toyota Camry, 2026, ARCA)

Paved Oval (1967–1970)
- Surface: Asphalt
- Length: 0.400 mi (0.644 km)
- Turns: 4

Remeasured Dirt Oval (1957–1967)
- Surface: Dirt
- Length: 0.400 mi (0.644 km)
- Turns: 4

Original Dirt Oval (1952–1957)
- Surface: Dirt
- Length: 0.500 mi (0.805 km)
- Turns: 4

Hickory Motor Speedway (formerly known as the Hickory Speedway from 1952 to 1988) is a 0.363 mi (0.584 km) oval short track in Newton, North Carolina. The track primarily holds NASCAR Local Racing Series season, CARS Tour and SMART Modified Tour races. It also formerly held top-tier NASCAR Cup Series and second-tier NASCAR Busch Series races. Hickory Motor Speedway is owned by Benny Yonnt and led by track promoter Kevin Piercy.

Built in 1952 by Charlie Combs as a dirt track, the facility held its first races in the same year running NASCAR-sanctioned races. The track changed hands in ownership numerous times in its early years. After it was purchased by Bill Edwards and Ed Griffin, the track was paved with asphalt in 1967. After the paving, ownership was again frequently changed until Benny Yount purchased the track in 1986. Under Yount's ownership, periodical renovations to fan amenities and the track itself were made to the facility. In 1999, all NASCAR national touring series left the track following the 1998 season. The track remains for local racing and the NASCAR Weekly Series.

== Description ==
=== Configuration ===
Hickory Motor Speedway (HMS) in its current form is measured at 0.363 mi (0.584 km), with 14° of banking in the first two turns, 12° of banking in the last two turns, and 8° of banking on the track's straightaways.

=== Amenities ===
Hickory Motor Speedway is located in Newton, North Carolina, served by Interstate 40, and has a physical address alongside U.S. Route 70. The facility has a seating capacity of 9,600 and a standing capacity of 3,600 according to The Charlotte Observer however, according to the Spartanburg Herald-Journal, the seating capacity is a high figure based if spectators were "packed in pretty tight".

== Track history ==
=== Early dirt years ===
On December 21, 1951, The News & Observer reported the formation of a new racetrack corporation by the name of Hickory Speedway, Inc., with Charlie Combs, Marshall McRee, and Clara Burgess announced as principal stockholders for the corporation. A week later, Combs announced as manager of the speedway detailed plans for the speedway in the Hickory Daily Record, stating plans to build a 0.5 mi (0.80 km) dirt track near U.S. Route 70. Combs additionally announced that groundbreaking on the facility had started a day prior on December 27. Planning for the track was simple; according to Combs' wife, Goldie, when planning the track's layout, "Charlie just looked out and marked it on the ground."

In the following months, plans for night racing and seating capacity of approximately 4,000 were announced. Hickory Speedway held its first race on May 18, 1952, with Gwyn Staley winning a NASCAR-sanctioned race amidst a crowd of 4,500. Lights for night racing were installed two months later, with Staley winning the first night race at the track. The first NASCAR Grand National Series (now the NASCAR Cup Series) was held the following year, with Tim Flock winning the event on May 16. In 1956, Hickory Speedway's length was shortened to 0.4 mi (0.64 km) after a remeasuring of the track.

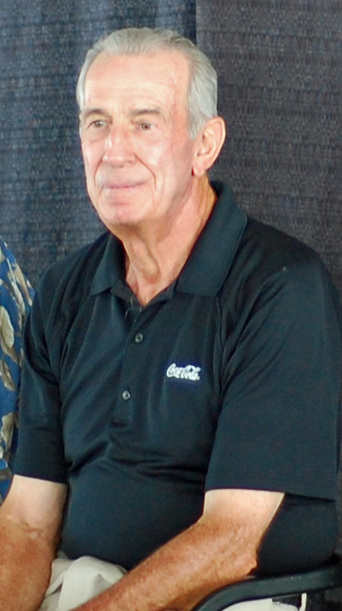
Former racing driver Ned Jarrett (pictured in 2007) was the general manager of Hickory Motor Speedway from 1967 to 1976.

In 1959, Combs sold his controlling interest of the speedway to Grafton Burgess, with Burgess being appointed as Combs' replacement as general manager. A year later, the track was reconfigured to make the turns steeper. In 1962 and 1965, two separate renovations were made, including upgrades to fan amenities, an air-conditioned media center, concrete walls for the outside retaining wall and pit wall, and guardrails for the inside retaining wall. Burgess sold the speedway in 1967 to Charlotte real estate developers Bill Edwards and Ed Griffin for nearly $144,000 (adjusted for inflation, $1,390,419), with Burgess resigning as general manager shortly after. Burgess was replaced by racing driver Ned Jarrett a month after Burgess' resignation.

=== Transition to pavement ===
On July 18, 1967, Edwards and Griffin announced plans to pave the track alongside other renovations, including the construction of a pit guardrail and a concrete wall in the track's third turn. The track paving was completed in early August, with the first paved races occurring on August 12. In 1970, the track was again remeasured and shortened, this time to 0.363 mi (0.584 km). A year later, the track ran its final NASCAR Cup Series race, with NASCAR removing any race under 250 mi (400 km) starting in 1972. In 1976, Jarrett resigned from his position as general manager in September, with motorsports broadcaster Hal Hamrick taking over the position in November. On August 14, 1977, the track experienced its first fatality after driver Bobby Isaac suffered a heart attack during a race due to heat exhaustion. Additional lights for better visibility in the pit area were installed the following year in April.

=== Ownership changes, renovations ===
In 1979, the track was bought out by a group of four businessmen: Hamrick, Newbern Fleming, Sam Herman, and Andre Teague. Three years later, Fleming bought out his partners' stake in the facility, becoming the sole owner of Hickory Speedway. Fleming kept ownership of the track for three years; in January 1986, the track's lease was bought out by a group of four businessmen, with the group stating hopes of eventually buying out the track. However, in December, the Daily Record reported that car dealership owner Benny Yount had instead purchased the track for approximately $1,000,000 (adjusted for inflation, $2,937,158). With his purchase, Yount announced a $100,000 renovation project focusing on improved fan amenities, a press and VIP booth, and replacing sections of retaining guardrails with concrete barriers. A majority of the project was completed by April 1987 for the track's season opener. Yount originally planned to hire a stand-alone promoter immediately after his purchase; however, he took over the role after a lease agreement fell through.

=== Benny Yount era, renaming ===
In November 1988, the track was officially renamed to "Hickory Motor Speedway"; on the same day, Bob Friedman was appointed as general manager of the track. In early 1991, another set of renovations were made to the facility, including the construction of a permanent road course layout, a new public address system, and the first complete repave of the track. The repaved surface ran its first race on March 30; the surface shortly after experienced problems. The surface in the third and fourth turns showed "severe wear", leading to a repave of the turns. The track was again completely repaved in 1992 after the surface came apart during a Busch Series race. Also in 1992, the track demolished approximately 120 to 130 seats to build sections for physically disabled people at a cost of "about $2,000 to $3,000". Two years later, additional retaining concrete barriers were erected around the track's inside perimeter. In 1995, parts of the infield of the first and second turns were paved alongside the addition of a new exit road for the track.

In November 1996, Friedman announced his resignation as general manager of HMS. Five months later, The Charlotte Observer reported that Yount was in negotiations to sell a majority stake of HMS in hopes of expanding the track's amenities and attractions, increase the seating capacity, and move the start-finish line to the opposite side of the track. On December 20, 1997, the operating lease to the track was sold to South Carolina real estate developer John Huffman, with Huffman's lease including an option to buy. Soon after Huffman's lease purchase, the track's lighting and sound systems were revamped in early 1998. Later in the year, the second-tier NASCAR Busch Series left the facility after a 17-year tenure due to the track not being able to keep up with rising purse payouts. Two years later in January, the track ended its affiliation and sanction with NASCAR for the American Racing Association, ending a 49-year partnership.

After three years of his lease, Huffman stated that he was seeking to sell the lease to solely focus on his real estate business. On August 20, 2001, Yount bought back the track's lease from Huffman. Four days later, the lease was bought out by HMS employees Sherry Clifton and Debbie Whitworth. Shortly after the duo's lease purchase, the track regained its NASCAR sanction in January 2002. Midway through the 2002 racing season, Whitworth resigned from her position as promoter, leaving Clifton as the sole promoter. In 2005, the leaseholder changed to the Clifton-owned Hammer Down LLC. According to Clifton, she opted to make her own company after a partner in the previous leaseholder left the company. Three years later, Clifton resigned as promoter of HMS and was replaced by the track's tire distributor, Kevin Piercy. In 2023, the track was awarded $568,264 in COVID-19 relief funds from the North Carolina state government, which was used to renovate bathrooms and the paving of the infield pit area.

== Events and uses ==
=== Auto racing ===
==== NASCAR ====
As of 2025, HMS runs a NASCAR Weekly Series season featuring various divisions. The ARCA Menards Series East added a 150-lap race at Hickory to the schedule in 2026.

Formerly, the facility held the top two divisions of NASCAR's touring series. From 1953 to 1971, HMS ran top-tier NASCAR Cup Series races. The track additionally held the second-tier NASCAR Busch Series races from 1982 to 1998.

==== Other events ====
HMS has hosted numerous regional racing series throughout its existence in addition to the NASCAR Weekly Series, including the CARS Tour, the SMART Modified Tour, and the Pro All Stars Series (PASS).

=== Filming production ===
HMS was used as a filming site for 1973 film The Last American Hero, a sports drama film about former NASCAR driver and team owner Junior Johnson. Parts of the film were filmed during a NASCAR Late Model Sportsman Series race on September 16, 1972, and a special filming session the following month featuring some of the drivers from the September race.
