= Black Mountain News =

Newspaper in Black Mountain, North Carolina

- Type: Weekly newspaper
- Format: Tabloid
- Publisher: Thomas Claybaugh
- Editor: Paul Clark
- Language: English
- Headquarters: 14 O. Henry Avenue, Asheville, North Carolina, U.S.
- Circulation: 3,000 (as of 2018)
- Sister newspapers: Asheville Citizen-Times, Haywood County News, News-Record & Sentinel, Pisgah Mountain News
- OCLC number: 40895877
- Website: blackmountainnews.com

Black Mountain News is a weekly newspaper based in Black Mountain, North Carolina, United States. The paper was founded in 1945 by James Clarence Cornelius and his brother-in-law, John Ealy, from Indianapolis, Indiana and was later purchased by Gordon Greenwood.

== History ==
In 1995, the Black Mountain News was purchased by Multimedia. Later that year, Multimedia was acquired by Gannett.

The newspaper won several awards from the North Carolina Press Association in 2016, including first place in general news reporting and profile feature, and additional awards for video and community coverage.

== See also ==
- List of newspapers published in North Carolina
