= The Brookings Register =

Newspaper in Brookings, South Dakota

Brookings Register
- Type: Daily newspaper
- Format: Broadsheet
- Owner: Champion Media
- Founder(s): George N. Breed; Charlies D.A. Wright
- Publisher: Brian Bloom
- Founded: 1882 (as Brookings County Sentinel)
- Language: English
- Headquarters: 756 22nd Avenue S, Brookings, South Dakota 57006
- Circulation: 1,743 (as of 2026)
- Website: brookingsregister.com

The Brookings Register is a newspaper published in Brookings, South Dakota. The newspaper is used for public notices including those published for the South Dakota Public Utilities Commission. The Register is owned by Champion Media,

== History ==
On March 30, 1882, the Brookings County Sentinel was first published by George N. Breed and Charlies D.A. Wright. That December, it was sold to D.J. Darrow, and again in 1887 to brothers W.E. and H.A. Whiting. On June 13, 1890, Breed and Paul Dutcher published the first edition of the Brookings Register. On January 6, 1891, the Register bought and absorbed the Sentinel.

In February 1930, Breed died. In November 1930, the Register was sold by Dutcher to H. Howard Biggar, V. W. Pratt and R.E. Phelps. In 1936, Charles H.J. Mitchell and his son C. Arthur Mitchell bought the paper. The Register reverted from a twice weekly to a weekly in 1942, but the change was reversed in 1948. Charles H.J. Mitchell died in 1961 at age 81, and in 1964 he was posthumously inducted into the South Dakota Newspaper Hall of Fame.

In 1970, Stauffer Communications acquired the Brookings Register and the Brookings Advertiser from Mrs. Ada R. Mitchell, and merge he two weeklies to form a daily. The paper was then acquired by the Omaha World-Herald Company in 1990, and added a Saturday edition in March 1995. The Register and Huron Plainsman were sold to News Media Corporation in 1999. The company ceased and shuttered the paper on August 6, 2025. After a period of eight days, the Register was acquired by Champion Media alongside the three other South Dakota papers.
