= Jones & Blount =

American news website

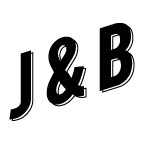
- Type: Website
- Format: Blog
- Staff writers: Donna King
- Founded: 2015
- Website: www.jonesandblount.com

Jones & Blount is a news web site devoted to coverage of North Carolina government and politics. Founded in 2015, the site is named for two streets in Raleigh - Jones Street, where the North Carolina General Assembly is located, and Blount Street, the location of the North Carolina Governor's Mansion.

The site's initial writers were Donna King and Drew Elliot.

Jones & Blount is included as a section covering North Carolina government and politics in the North State Journal.
