= Israelson =

Israelson is a surname. Notable people with the surname include:

- Agnes Israelson (1896–1989), American politician from Minnesota
- Bill Israelson (born 1957), American golfer
- Larry Israelson (born 1952), Canadian ice hockey player
