= The Chatham News =

Weekly newspaper in Siler City, North Carolina

- Type: Weekly newspaper
- Owner: North State Media
- Publisher: Neal Robbins
- Editor-in-chief: Matt Mercer
- Editor: Griffin Daughtry
- Founded: 1924
- Language: English
- Headquarters: Siler City, N.C.
- OCLC number: 13142116
- Website: chathamnewsrecord.com

The Chatham News is a weekly newspaper based in Siler City, North Carolina and serving Chatham County, North Carolina.

== History ==
Started in 1924, the newspaper has been family-owned for much of its history. E.A. Resch bought the newspaper, along with The Chatham Record of Pittsboro, in 1939. His son Alan Resch joined The Chatham News in 1962 and was replaced by wife Mary Resch as editor and publisher when he died in 2016. On October 25, 2018 The Chatham News announced that The Chatham News Publishing Company, Inc. had sold the newspapers to The Chatham Media Group LLC. The group included former Sanford Herald publisher Bill Horner III, Kirk Bradley, and Chris Ehrenfeld. Bradley and Ehrenfeld cared about the papers being locally owned.

The newspaper was sold to North State Journal owner North State Media in May 2023.

== See also ==
- List of newspapers published in North Carolina
