= Camellia Okpodu =

American biochemist

Camellia Moses Okpodu (born January 24, 1964, in Portsmouth, Virginia), is a college professor and dean.

== Education and early life ==
Camellia Okpodu graduated in 1982 from West Brunswick High School, Shallotte, North Carolina. She received both her undergraduate and postgraduate education from North Carolina State University (Raleigh, North Carolina), earning a B.S. in Biochemistry (1987) and a Ph.D. in Plant Physiology and Biochemistry (1994).

In 1984, Camellia became the first Black woman to hold the title for Miss Brunswick County, a preliminary scholarship pageant for Miss America.

== Career ==
Okpodu is a dean at the University of Wyoming as of 2021. She was also a biology professor and dean at Xavier University of Louisiana (XULA), a professor and chair at Norfolk State University (NSU), and was the 2007–2008 American Council of Education Fellow.
