= Pender-Topsail Post & Voice =

- Type: Weekly newspaper
- Owner: Post Voice LLC Burgaw N.C.
- Publisher: Andy Pettigrew
- Editor: Andy Pettigrew
- Founded: 1971
- Language: American English
- Headquarters: P.O. Box 955 Burgaw NC 28425
- Circulation: 5000 (as of 2020)
- ISSN: 2169-1002
- OCLC number: 805227918
- Website: post-voice.com

The Pender-Topsail Post & Voice is an American, English language community newspaper based in Burgaw, North Carolina. The paper provides coverage of news, sports, features, and events exclusively for Pender County. It has a circulation of approximately 5000.

== History ==
The Pender Post, which began publication in the 1971, purchased the Topsail Voice in March, 2012. and is now known as the Pender Topsail Post & Voice. The Post & Voice purchased the Pender Chronicle in September 2012 and retired the name of the county's oldest newspaper. The Post & Voice provides coverage of news, sports, features, and events exclusively for Pender County.

== History ==
Previous papers that are now part of the Pender Topsail Post & Voice:

- The Pender Post. (Burgaw, N.C.) 1971–2012, OCLC 28598394
- Topsail Voice. (Hampstead, N.C.) 1991–2012, OCLC 32600106
- Pender Chronicle (Burgaw, Pender County, N.C.) 1893-2012, OCLC 13247075

== North Carolina Press Association Journalism Awards ==
The Pender-Topsail Post & Voice is a member of the North Carolina Press Association:

- 2010, General Excellence, North Carolina Press Association

== See also ==
- List of newspapers in North Carolina
