= The Triangle Tribune =

Weekly newspaper

- Type: Weekly newspaper
- Owner: The Charlotte Post Publishing Company
- Managing editor: Bonita Best
- Headquarters: 5007 Southpark Drive, Ste 200-G; Durham, NC 27713
- City: Durham
- Country: United States
- Sister newspapers: The Charlotte Post
- OCLC number: 40565647
- Website: triangletribune.com

The Triangle Tribune is an American, English language weekly newspaper headquartered in Durham, North Carolina. It was founded in 1998 and targets the African-American community. The Charlotte Post Publishing Company owns The Triangle Tribune and its sister paper The Charlotte Post.

== See also ==
- List of newspapers published in North Carolina
