= Mebane Enterprise =

The Mebane Enterprise
- Type: Weekly newspaper
- Publisher: Womack Pub. Co.
- Editor: Dale Edwards
- Founded: 1908
- Language: English
- Headquarters: 106 N. 4th Street, Mebane, North Carolina United States
- Circulation: 3,100 pd, 81 fr
- Sister newspapers: News of Orange, Mebane Enterprise, Caswell Messenger
- OCLC number: 24839575
- Website: mebaneenterprise.com

The Mebane Enterprise was a newspaper based in Mebane, North Carolina. It was previously known as The Alamance-Orange Enterprise until February 13, 1991.

The Enterprise was a weekly community newspaper that focuses on local government in Mebane and Alamance County, as well as local business and school news. In 2018, the paid circulation was 3,100, and the free circulation was 81.

This newspaper is unrelated to the Mebane Enterprise (which merged with the Hillsborough Journal in 1965) published from 1920–1967.

In January 2024, Womack Publishing announced the Mebane Enterprise will close its office and merge with The News of Orange County at the end of the month.

== Awards ==
In 2017 and 2018, the Mebane Enterprise won 15 North Carolina Press Association awards:

- Education Reporting (1st place, 2018)
- Sports Columns (1st place, 2017; 2nd place, 2018)
- Best Video (1st place 2017 and 2018; 2nd place 2017 and 2018; 3rd place 2017)
- Best Multimedia Project (1st place 2018; 2nd place 2017 and 2018)
- Investigative Reporting (2nd place 2017)
- Best Niche Publication (2nd place 2018 for Mebane Newcomer's Guide)
- Political Reporting (2nd place, 2017)
- Religion Reporting (3rd place, 2018)
