= The Chatham Record =

Chatham News & Record
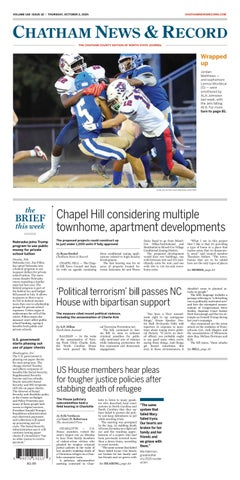
- October 2, 2025, front page of Chatham News & Record
- Type: Weekly newspaper
- Format: Broadsheet
- Owner: North State Media
- Publisher: Trip Hoffend
- Editor-in-chief: Cory Lavalette
- Editor: Jordan Golson
- Founded: September 19, 1878 (as "The Chatham Record")
- Language: English
- Headquarters: Siler City, N.C.
- Sister newspapers: North State Journal, Chatham News, The Chatham Record
- ISSN: 1067-1765
- Website: chathamnewsrecord.com

Chatham News & Record is a weekly newspaper based in Siler City, North Carolina and serving Chatham County, North Carolina.

== History ==
First published on September 19, 1878, The Chatham Record was family-owned for nearly 80 years after E.A. Resch bought the newspaper along with The Chatham News of Siler City in 1939. On October 25, 2018 The Chatham News announced that The Chatham News Publishing Company, Inc. had sold the newspapers to The Chatham Media Group LLC. The newspapers were combined into the "Chatham News + Record" by Chatham Media Group in November 2018.

The newspaper was sold to North State Journal owner North State Media in May 2023.

== See also ==
- List of newspapers published in North Carolina
