= The Daily Dispatch =

Daily newspaper in North Carolina

Coordinates: 36.328094°N 78.406915°W

- Type: Daily newspaper
- Format: Broadsheet
- Owner: Paxton Media Group
- Publisher: Jeff Ayers
- Editor-in-chief: Gary Band
- News editor: Tyler Davis
- Founded: August 12, 1914; 111 years ago
- Language: English
- Headquarters: 420 South Garnett Street; Henderson, North Carolina 27536 United States
- City: Henderson
- Country: United States of America
- ISSN: 2577-347X
- OCLC number: 37631964
- Website: hendersondispatch.com

The Daily Dispatch is an American, English-language community-oriented daily newspaper based in Henderson, North Carolina, primarily covering the North Carolina counties of Vance, Granville, and Warren. It is published three times a week—on Tuesdays, Thursdays, and Saturdays—except on certain national holidays.

== History ==
President and Editor P.T. Way started the publication as a four-page, 16-column daily version of his semi-weekly Henderson Gold Leaf on that date when World War I brought the need for up-to-date news of events abroad. The newspaper took the name of the Henderson Daily Dispatch in 1915 when Henry A. Dennis joined the staff as the paper's news editor. The Gold Leaf reverted to a weekly edition that year and stopped publication following a fire in December 1946 at the newspaper office.

- The Gold Leaf. [online resource] (Henderson, Vance County, N.C.) 1881-1911; OCLC: 894524007
- Henderson Daily Dispatch. (Henderson, Vance County, N.C.) 1914-1995. OCLC: 24562449
- The Daily Dispatch. (Henderson, Vance County, N.C.) 1995-current; OCLC: 37631964

The Dispatch bounced back from the fire and operated in a temporary headquarters until its office was rebuilt in 1947. Ten years later, the company moved to a new plant at 304 South Chestnut Street in Henderson. It printed its first edition on a new 32-page rotary press on Monday, Dec. 2, 1957.

In May 1973, the company changed from the old "hot type" process of using molten lead to "cold type" printing, which relied on a typesetter.

In October 1980, The Dispatch installed a front-end system that handled all copy electronically, making typewriters almost obsolete. That system was replaced by a more modern system, using a pagination process, in 1990.

Dennis and his descendants managed the newspaper into the 1990s. Henry A. Dennis, M.L. Finch and S.A. Jones bought all of the company's stock upon Way's death in 1922. Dennis served as president and editor, while Finch served as business manager and secretary-treasurer until his death in 1973. Dennis died in 1979, leaving his family as sole stockholders and his son, William B. Dennis, as editor until his own retirement in March 1994.

The newspaper was sold to Paducah Newspapers Inc. in February 1994, and Rick Bean began a 10-year tenure as the publisher of the newspaper. He took the newspaper from an afternoon daily being published on Monday through Saturday to a morning edition with delivery on Tuesday through Sunday. The newspaper also changed its name to The Daily Dispatch and later launched the newspaper's website, www.hendersondispatch.com.

Bean is currently a group publisher for Paxton Media Group newspapers in North Carolina, Tennessee and Georgia, and the publisher of The Herald Sun in Durham, N.C., and the High Point Enterprise in High Point, N.C.

James D. Edwards became publisher of The Dispatch when Bean moved to High Point in 2004. He previously served as managing editor in the 1980s.

William B. Dennis's son, William A. Dennis, took over as editor following his father's retirement. Other editors have included James Dutra, Laverne Jefferies, Arthur Murray, Glenn Craven and Luke Horton.

The newspaper's current editor, Alan Wooten, joined The Daily Dispatch staff in April 2012. Wooten became publisher/editor when Edwards left the newspaper in January 2014.

== Awards ==
The Daily Dispatch is a member of the North Carolina Newspaper Association. It was a back-to-back winner in 2006 and 2007 of the North Carolina Press Association's General Excellence Awards for newspapers with 15,000 subscribers and less.

== See also ==
- List of newspapers in North Carolina
