= Triad City Beat =

Alternative newspaper in North Carolina

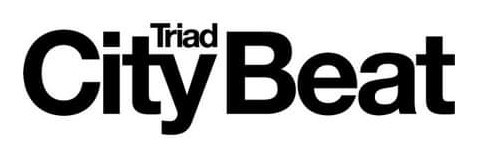
- Type: Alternative weekly
- Format: Tabloid
- Owner: Beat Media Inc.
- Publisher: Brian Clarey
- Editor: Brian Clarey
- Founded: February 2014
- Ceased publication: February 2025
- Language: English
- Headquarters: Greensboro, NC; United States
- Website: triad-city-beat.com

Triad City Beat was a free weekly alternative newspaper with distribution in Greensboro, Winston-Salem, and High Point in North Carolina. It was founded in 2014 by Brian Clarey, Jordan Green and Eric Ginsburg, who were former editors and reporters for YES! Weekly. The newspaper primarily covers topics local to the Triad such as news, politics, culture, opinion, music, and food. It describes itself as an independent voice to hold "economic and governmental powers accountable" across the Triad and North Carolina, and as a defender of democracy, as well as "LGBTQ+ rights, racial justice and an urban sensibility". It has an estimated circulation of 10,000, and is published every Thursday.

In 2023, the Triad City Beat hired a new "CityBeat" reporter specifically to expand its coverage of city council meetings in Greensboro and Winston-Salem. The newspaper releases the CityBeat content for free use by others under the Creative Commons Attribution-No Derivatives license.

The paper announced it was facing "financial difficulties" and needed to raise $20,000 by the end of January 2025 to continue operations. It announced in February 2025 that it would be winding down operations after its final print issue on February 20.

== Notable reporting ==
Some of the newspaper's deeper reporting includes a profile of the group Redneck Revolt, investigations into substandard housing in Greensboro and High Point, and coverage following the in-custody homicide of a local man by the Greensboro Police Department. In September 2019, Triad City Beat broke the news of child sexual abuse allegations at a group home run by the Greensboro Deputy Chief of Police.

The New York Times has cited reports from the Triad City Beat and then-associate editor Eric Ginsburg in their front-page story and followup story concerning the disproportionate harassment of black drivers in Greensboro by city police.

The Triad City Beat's independent reporting had been cited by other national media outlets besides The New York Times, including Vice, Bustle, Colorlines, and The Jewish Press. They have also been extensively cited by Triad and North Carolina outlets such as the Triad Business Journal, WUNC, WFDD, and NC Policy Watch.

== See also ==
- Yes! Weekly - another Triad alt-weekly newspaper
- List of newspapers published in North Carolina
