= The Transylvania Times =

Coordinates: 35.234434°N 82.734190°W

- Type: Biweekly newspaper
- Owner: Community Newspaper Holdings
- Founded: July 1, 1887; 138 years ago
- Headquarters: Water Oak Suites; Brevard, NC 28712
- City: Brevard, North Carolina
- Country: United States
- Circulation: 7,700
- OCLC number: 13285957
- Website: transylvaniatimes.com

The Transylvania Times is an American, English language bi-weekly newspaper in Transylvania County, North Carolina, in the United States, and its surrounding area. The paper was founded in 1887, and was family-owned and operated until it was sold to Community Newspaper Holdings in 2021. It provides news coverage for Brevard, Pisgah Forest, Rosman and Lake Toxaway, as well as the townships of Cathey's Creek, Dunn's Rock, Eastatoe, Gloucester, Hogback and Little River.

Weekly features include Church News, School News, Sports, Arts and Entertainment, Senior Citizens News and Opinions of the Readers. The Transylvania Times has funded and supported many community improvement initiatives.

== History ==
E.S. Warrack published the first edition of the newspaper on July 1, 1887, under the name The Transylvania Pioneer. It was later known as The French Broad Hustler in the early 1890s and as The Sylvan Valley News in 1895. The paper was purchased by Ora Jones in 1911. Jones sold the paper in 1916 to Nowell Hollowell who changed the name to The Brevard News. Charles Douglas bought it in 1931 and changed the name to The Transylvania Times. The paper was purchased in 1941 by Ed M. Anderson. It has been in the Anderson family until it was sold to Community Newspaper Holdings in 2021.

== Awards ==
The Transylvania Times has won numerous writing, advertising and photography awards from the North Carolina Press Association and the National Newspaper Association, including:

- 2019, 3rd Place, Editorial Page
- 2019, 2nd Place, Sports Feature Writing
