= Carolina Peacemaker =

African-American weekly newspaper published in Greensboro

- Type: Weekly newspaper
- Owner(s): Carolina Newspapers, Inc.
- Editor: Afrique I. Kilimanjaro
- Founded: 1967
- Language: American English
- Headquarters: 807 Summit Ave; Greensboro, Guilford County, NC 27405
- City: Greensboro
- Country: United States
- Circulation: 9,100
- OCLC number: 27183769
- Website: peacemakeronline.com

The Carolina Peacemaker is an African-American weekly newspaper in Greensboro in the U.S. state of North Carolina. It began publication in 1967 and is a member of the National Newspaper Publishers Association and the North Carolina Press Association. It has a weekly circulation of 9,100 copies.

== History ==
The paper was founded in 1967 by Dr. John Kilimanjaro, a professor at North Carolina A&T State University. Kilimanjaro served as the president and publisher of the Carolina Peacemaker until his death in 2019.

The paper endorsed Democratic candidate Tom Gilmore in the 1984 North Carolina Democratic gubernatorial primary.

An editorial criticizing the film The Color Purple for its portrayal of a same-sex relationship between two women appeared in the paper in 1986. The Carolina Peacemaker published a rebuttal to the editorial soon after.
