= Devils Lake Journal =

Newspaper in Devils Lake, North Dakota

- Type: Daily newspaper
- Owner: Champion Media
- Founder: J.H. Bloom
- Founded: December 3, 1906
- Language: American English
- Headquarters: 516 Fourth Street Northeast, Devils Lake, North Dakota 58301, United States
- Country: United States
- OCLC number: 42427419
- Website: devilslakejournal.com

The Devils Lake Daily Journal is an American English language daily newspaper published in Devils Lake, North Dakota. It is owned by Champion Media. The Journal is the official newspaper of Ramsey County, North Dakota.

== History ==
On December 3, 1906, the first edition of the Devils Lake Journal was published, by Col J.H. Bloom. In July 1913, Bloom bought the Bismarck Times. In 1920, business manager Milford H. Graham bought the Journal from Bloom. In October 1942, the paper was leased to H.W. Fredericks. After 22 months, in August 1944, the paper was leased to the owner's son, M.R. Graham.

In May 1970, M.H. Graham died at age 70. In September 1882, Roy H. Park of Park Newspapers Inc. acquired the Journal from the Graham family. In October 1993, Park died. A few month later the chain sold off 33 papers, but retained the Journal and The Bemidji Pioneer.

In July 1996, Media General Inc. purchased Park Communications for $711 million. Following the sale, in January 1997, the Journal was sold to Community Newspaper Holdings and the Pioneer was sold to the Forum Communications Company. In May 1998, CNH and Liberty Group Publishing swapped ownership of several papers, including the Journal. In May 2006, the company became GateHouse Media, and in August 2019 merged with Gannett. In November 2022, former publisher Kathy Svidal and MCM Media, publisher of the Thief River Falls Times, acquired the Journal from Gannett. Champion Media was a business partner in the sale.
