= Charlotte Weekly =

Newspaper in North Carolina, US

- Type: Weekly newspaper
- Format: Tabloid
- Owner: Charlotte Media Group
- Founded: 2002
- Language: English
- Headquarters: 1421-C Orchard Lake Drive, Charlotte, North Carolina United States
- OCLC number: 61299266
- Website: thecharlotteweekly.com

Charlotte Weekly is a weekly newspaper based in Charlotte, North Carolina. It is now called the South Charlotte Weekly. There are three editions of the newspaper, these include the South Charlotte Weekly , the Union County Weekly , and the Mathews-Mint Hill Weekly . These newspapers are published every friday and can be found in newsracks around the Charlotte area.

== See also ==
- List of newspapers published in North Carolina
