= The Anson Record =

American newspaper based in Anson County

- Type: Weekly newspaper
- Owner: Champion Media
- Publisher: Tricia Johnston
- Editor: Matthew Sasser
- Advertising: Erica Nichols
- Founded: 1881
- Language: English
- Headquarters: 123 East Martin Street, Suite 400 Wadesboro, North Carolina United States
- Circulation: 5,000 paid, 1,000 free (as of 2018)
- OCLC number: 41887128
- Website: ansonrecord.com

The Anson Record is an American newspaper based in Wadesboro, North Carolina, covering Anson County. Its mission statement is "The Anson Record seeks to provide the news the community needs, reported faithfully and fully, with respect for all and favor to none. We strive to be authoritative and insightful, to inform and to delight."

== History ==
The Anson Record traces its heritage back to 1881, as the Messenger and Intelligencer (and Ansonian), but the modern Anson Record was first published on Jan. 20, 1955.

The Record was previously owned by Heartland Publications. In 2012 Versa Capital Management merged Heartland Publications, Ohio Community Media, the former Freedom papers it had acquired, and Impressions Media into a new company, Civitas Media. Civitas Media sold its properties in the Carolinas toChampion Media in 2017.

== See also ==
- List of newspapers in North Carolina
