= Brunswick Beacon =

- Type: Weekly newspaper (Thursdays)
- Format: Broadsheet
- Owner: Paxton Media Group
- Publisher: John McClure
- Editor: Dylan Phillips
- Founded: 1962
- Language: English
- Headquarters: 3674 Express Drive, Shallotte, NC 28459
- Circulation: 15,000
- ISSN: 1528-6169
- Website: brunswickbeacon.com

The Brunswick Beacon is a newspaper serving Shallotte, North Carolina, the islands of Holden Beach, Ocean Isle Beach and Sunset Beach and other communities in southwestern Brunswick County including Carolina Shores, Calabash, Ash, Supply and Bolivia. With a circulation of about 15,000, the Beacon primarily focuses it coverage on local government, local businesses and events, crime, public schools and local sports. Because of the area's allure to tourists and retirees insistent on keeping up with Brunswick County's burgeoning real estate market, the Beacon boasts paid circulation in 49 states.

== History ==
The Brunswick Beacon was founded by Brunswick County native Robert B. Stanley, Sr. in 1962, following a series of ill-fated publications that served the area dating back to the 1930s. The first publication of what would become The Brunswick Beacon was called Shallotte Press and was dated November 1, 1962. A contest held to name the paper was won by Shallotte businesswoman, JoAnn Simmons.

With the islands nearly vacant in the early 1960s and small pockets of population in the fishing-dominated surrounding communities, front-page news from that period included a local man being stung by a bee, a raid on a local still, and a jailbreak in a neighboring town.

The Beacon was purchased in 1970 by Edward Sweatt, then a partner in Community Newspapers Inc. out of Spartanburg, S.C. Sweatt and his wife, Carolyn, staved off competition from several groups intent on starting a second newspaper in the market and skillfully guided the Beacon through the area's population explosion in the late 1980s and early 1990s. By the mid-1990s, real estate and service industry advertising allowed the Beacon to expand from printing 28 to 32 pages to 70-plus pages each week.

In early 2001, the Beacon moved from its location on Main Street to a 21,000-square-foot office center and printing plant on Smith Avenue. The Beacon was purchased in June 2003 by Landmark Community Newspapers Inc. of Shelbyville, Ky. LCNI is a division of Landmark Media Enterprises, a privately held media company in Norfolk, Va., with interests in newspapers and special publications, TV broadcasting, cable programming, outdoor advertising and education.

In May 2021, the Beacon, along with 45 other newspapers owned by Landmark Media Enterprises, was sold the newspaper to Paxton Media Group. The paper's office was relocated from Smith Avenue to a new location at 3674 Express Drive in Shallotte.

== See also ==
- List of newspapers published in North Carolina
