= Biltmore Beacon =

- Type: Weekly newspaper
- Owner: Mountaineer Publishing Company
- Editor: Shelby Harrell
- Headquarters: 220 N. Main Street; Waynesville, North Carolina 28786
- City: Asheville
- Country: United States
- Website: biltmorebeacon.com

The Biltmore Beacon is a weekly newspaper published by the Mountaineer Publishing Company. It reports the news and events of Asheville, North Carolina, and is specifically written to be of interest to residents and businesses in the various Biltmore communities, including Biltmore Forest, Biltmore Park, Biltmore Lake, The Ramble at Biltmore Forest, Main Street at Biltmore Park and Biltmore Village.

The newspaper is published on Thursdays.

== See also ==
- List of newspapers published in North Carolina
