= Richmond County Daily Journal =

Newspaper published in Rockingham, NC, US

- Type: Daily newspaper
- Owner: Champion Media
- Founder: Scott M. Thomas
- Editor: Matthew Sasser
- Founded: 1931
- Language: American English
- Headquarters: 607 East Broad Ave. Suite B.
- City: Rockingham, North Carolina 28379
- Country: United States
- ISSN: 1050-7639
- OCLC number: 13247047
- Website: yourdailyjournal.com

The Richmond County Daily Journal is an American, English language newspaper published in Rockingham, Richmond County, North Carolina. The paper is published bi-weekly, on Wednesday and Saturday. The predecessor of this paper is the Richmond County Journal (1931–1966). The newspaper is a member of the North Carolina Press Association.

== See also ==
- List of newspapers in North Carolina
