= The Observer-News-Enterprise =

Newspaper published in Newton, North Carolina

- Type: Daily newspaper
- Publisher: Seth Mabry
- Editor: Seith Mabry
- Founded: 1955
- Language: American English
- Headquarters: 309 N. College Avenue; Newton, North Carolina 28658
- City: Newton
- Country: United States
- Website: observernewsonline.com

The Observer-News-Enterprise is an American, English language daily newspaper headquartered in Newton, Catawba County, North Carolina. It was founded in 1955 and it is a member of the North Carolina Press Association.

== History ==
The following named newspapers preceded The Observer-News-Enterprise:

- The Observer and News-Enterprise. (Newton, N.C.) 1954-1955
- The Newton Conover twin-city observer and the Catawba news-enterprise. (Newton, N.C.) 1954-1954
- The Catawba news-enterprise. (Newton, N.C.) 1919-1954
- The Newton Conover twin-city observer. (Newton, N.C.) 19??-1954

== See also ==
- List of newspapers in North Carolina
