= Ocracoke Observer =

Newspaper published in Ocracoke, NC, US

- Type: Monthly print edition; Daily online coverage
- Owner(s): Connie Leinbach and Peter Vankevich
- Editor: Connie Leinbach
- Founded: 1999
- Political alignment: Independent
- Language: English, Spanish, French, German
- Headquarters: Ocracoke, NC; United States
- Country: United States
- Circulation: 2,500-6,000
- Website: ocracokeobserver.com

The Ocracoke Observer is a print and online newspaper produced in Ocracoke, NC. The paper is created on Ocracoke and printed in Greenville, NC. Ten print issues are produced every year (March through December) and news is posted on a daily basis on the Ocracoke Observer website. Circulation of the print edition fluctuates seasonally and ranges from 2,500 to 6,000.

== About ==
Founded in 1999, the Ocracoke Observer has been owned and operated by Connie Leinbach and Peter Vankevich since March 2014. Regular online news publication began in the fall of 2014.

The Observer focuses its coverage on Ocracoke Island and the larger surrounding Hyde and Dare County areas. The paper is the only active print news source in Hyde County. Content coverage ranges from hyperlocal news about the Ocracoke school, local events and features about residents, to larger regional topics such as the National Park Service and the North Carolina Department of Transportation Ferry Division. Stories are periodically translated into Spanish, French and German.

== Awards and recognition ==
- 2016 North Carolina Press Association Awards: The Observer received 6 awards in the Online division including first place awards for Arts and Entertainment Writing and Headline Writing.
- 2017 North Carolina Press Association Awards: The Observer received 13 awards in the Online division including third place for general excellence of its website.
