= The Bladen Journal =

Newspaper in North Carolina, US

Bladen Journal
- Type: Weekly newspaper
- Owner: Champion Media
- Publisher: Denise Ward
- Editor-in-chief: Mark DeLap
- Staff writers: Sonny Jones
- Language: English
- Headquarters: 207 East Broad Street Ste B, in Elizabethtown. Elizabethtown, NC
- Circulation: 4,400
- OCLC number: 5884408
- Website: bladenjournal.com

The Bladen Journal is a weekly newspaper, published in Elizabethtown, North Carolina, United States. The paper caters to residents of Bladen County. The paper is published each Tuesday.

== History ==
In 1898 a daily news bulletin titled The Bladen Express began being published in Clarkton, North Carolina. In 1911 the paper changed its name to The Bladen Journal. About 16 years later the publication relocated to Elizabethtown, North Carolina.

In 1929 Jessie Lee Sugg McCulloch became editor of the Journal, thus becoming one of the first women in North Carolina to edit a newspaper. She served in the role until 1974. Alan Wooten was named editor in July 2018, and Sara Fox took over in September 2022. In 2023, Fox added a Spanish section to the Journal website and physical newspaper to serve the Spanish-speaking community in Bladen County.

The Journal first began publishing in 1898 as The Clarkton Express. and was given its current name in 1902. The Journal has had multiple owners including Community Newspaper Holdings, Heartland Publications, and Civitas Media. Civitas Media sold its properties in the Carolinas to Champion Media in 2017.

== See also ==
- List of newspapers in North Carolina
