= High Country Press =

- Type: Digital newspaper
- Publisher: Ken Ketchie
- Editor: Ken Ketchie
- Staff writers: Jesse Wood
- Founded: 2005
- Language: English
- Headquarters: 130 North Depot Street; Boone, North Carolina
- Website: hcpress.com

High Country Press is an American, English language daily online, and formerly weekly print, news publication based in Boone, North Carolina. The newspaper was founded May 5, 2005 by current editor and publisher Ken Ketchie. The newspaper serves Watauga County and Avery County in northwestern North Carolina. On Feb. 29, 2012 the newspaper made the transition to the World Wide Web.

The newspaper staff also produces High Country Magazine seven times per year and the seasonal High Country Visitor Guide.

The staff has won multiple awards in recent years, including first place in the 2010 North Carolina Press Association Journalism Contest for News Coverage – Community Division (circulation over 10,000) and second place in the General Excellence for Web Sites category in that same division.

== See also ==
- List of newspapers in North Carolina
