= The Pilot (North Carolina newspaper) =

Newspaper in North Carolina

- Type: Biweekly newspaper
- Publisher: David Woronoff
- Editor: John Nagy
- Founded: 1920
- Language: English
- Headquarters: 145 W Pennsylvania Ave, Southern Pines, N.C.
- Circulation: 15,000
- Website: thepilot.com

The Pilot is an American newspaper established in 1920. It is published Wednesdays and Sundays in Southern Pines, North Carolina and covers Moore County, North Carolina. Its estimated circulation was 15,000 in 2018; its website has over 1.4 million views and 335,000 visitors.

== Ownership history ==
The first issue of The Pilot was published on November 26, 1920 by Stacy Brewer in Vass, North Carolina. Brewer sold the paper on September 7, 1928 to Nelson C. Hyde of Southern Pines. The Pilot opened a branch office in the Patch Building in Southern Pines for its editorial and advertising staff. The newspaper also opened similar offices in Pinehurst and Aberdeen and moved to Aberdeen in 1929. Nelson Hyde sold The Pilot to James Boyd on May 23, 1941. Nelson Hyde resigned as editor and Carl Thompson took his position. James Boyd died in February 1944 and his wife, Katharine Boyd, took over the role as publisher and editor. In October 1968, Katherine Boyd sold The Pilot to Sam and Marjorie Ragan.

In January 1986, The Pilot became a semi-weekly paper and was published on Monday and Thursday. In July 1996, Frank Daniels Jr., Frank Daniels III, David Woronoff, Jack Andrews and Lee Drinks purchased The Pilot. On July 23, 1998, The Pilot launched its website, and in October 1999, The Pilot began publishing three days a week – Monday, Wednesday, and Friday. In May 2013, The Pilot began to print twice weekly – Wednesday and Sunday.

== Circulation ==
- In 1931, the average weekly circulation was 1,450 copies.
- In 1978, the average weekly circulation was 8,850, and the cost was 15c per issue.
- In 1998, the average weekly circulation was 15,980.
- In 2018, the average weekly circulation was 15,000.

== Awards ==
The Pilot won Best Community Newspaper in the United States in 2015, 2016, and 2017 from the National Newspaper Association. In their comments about the 2015 award for General Excellence in the Non-daily Division, with circulation over 10,000, the NNA wrote:

"of all the entries, this one said 'community' loudest to us. Human interest stories and local issue coverage abound. Just as important, The Pilot’s Opinion pages contain insightful, vigorous debate. This is a well-packaged paper with solid photography. The people of Southern Pines, NC, are fortunate to have this strong news source."

In 2017, Pilot photographer Ted Fitzgerald won the Hugh Morton Photographer of the Year award for a community newspaper by the North Carolina Press Association. The paper won numerous awards in the category of community newspapers with over 10,000 circulation, including first place in the following categories: Feature Writing, Arts and Entertainment Reporting, Best Niche Publication, and Best Video among others.

== Quotes from the Paper ==
A long time ago, a wise old editor said,

the function of a newspaper

Is “to print the news and raise hell.”

I haven’t been able to improve upon that definition.

-Sam Ragan, Editor and Publisher, 1968-1996
