= The Sampson Independent =

- Type: Daily newspaper
- Owner: Champion Media
- Publisher: Sherry Matthews
- Editor: Sherry Matthews
- Founded: 1924
- Headquarters: 303 Elizabeth Street, Clinton, North Carolina 28328
- City: Clinton, North Carolina
- Country: United States of America
- OCLC number: 13264721
- Website: clintonnc.com

The Sampson Independent is an American daily newspaper headquartered in Clinton, Sampson County, North Carolina. The paper is a member of the North Carolina Press Association.

== History ==
The lineage of the Sampson Independent includes the following newspapers:

- The News Dispatch, the Sampson Democrat. (Clinton, N.C.) (1892 - 1924)
- The Sampsonian. (Clinton, N.C.) (1924 - 1976)

== See also ==
- List of newspapers in North Carolina
