= The Charlotte Post =

Newspaper in North Carolina, USA

Charlotte Post
- Type: Weekly newspaper
- Format: Broadsheet
- Publisher: Gerald Johnson
- Editor-in-chief: Herbert White
- Founded: 1878
- Language: English
- Headquarters: 5118 Princess St. Charlotte, NC 28269
- City: Charlotte
- Country: United States
- Circulation: 22,305
- Sister newspapers: The Triangle Tribune
- OCLC number: 17635192
- Website: thecharlottepost.com

The Charlotte Post, founded in 1878, is an African American, English language, community-based weekly newspaper in Charlotte, North Carolina. The Charlotte Post has been distributed in counties surrounding Charlotte and upstate South Carolina. The Post is read by thousands of area residents and has earned numerous national and local journalism and service awards. The newspaper is owned by The Charlotte Post Publishing Company in Charlotte, North Carolina.

== History ==
The paper regards itself as a leading provider of news and entertainment coverage from a Black perspective.

It is a weekly broadsheet that at one time sold for $1 a copy, as well as distributed at no charge at dark green vendor boxes located in Uptown Charlotte and throughout the city primarily in African-American neighborhoods.

The Charlotte Post is published by The Charlotte Post Publishing Company. A sister newspaper, The Triangle Tribune, serves the Research Triangle area.

== The Charlotte Post Foundation ==
The Charlotte Post Foundation is a 501c3 foundation that provides services to uplift and empower people in underserved communities through educational programs. They provide after school programs for elementary children in Title I schools, offer community convening sessions to discuss issues impacting at risk communities and give scholarships to African American students.

The Post Foundation operates through three distinct programs: corrective education programs, community education programs and continuing education programs. The Educational Programs are specifically intended for elementary school students. The Community Education Programs allow for discussion on relevant community issues. The Continuing Education Programs provide scholarships for students to continue pursuing higher education.

== The Charlotte Post Staff ==
The Charlotte Post is run by a group of individuals, including the following.

- Gerald Johnson— Publisher & CEO
- Andre Johnson- Chief Operating Officer
- Herbert White— Editor In Chief
- Bonitta Best— Managing Editor
- Patrice Johnson— Production
- Linda Johnson— Sales & Marketing Manager
- Tania Johnson— Receptionist
- Cameron Williams- Reporter

== Archives Available ==
Back issues of The Charlotte Post are now available digitally thanks to Johnson C. Smith University. The digitized issues are available online and cover 1930-2006, with the majority of issues covering 1971-2006.

== See also ==
- List of newspapers published in North Carolina
