= Laurinburg Exchange =

The Laurinburg Exchange
- Type: Daily newspaper
- Owner: Champion Media
- Publisher: Tricia Johnston
- Editor: W. Curt Vincent
- Staff writers: Katelin Gandee, Cheris Hodges
- Founded: 1882
- Language: American English
- Headquarters: 915 S. Main St., Suite H, Laurinburg, North Carolina United States
- City: Laurinburg
- Country: United States
- Circulation: 8,200 (as of 2018)
- OCLC number: 33474351
- Website: laurinburgexchange.com

The Laurinburg Exchange is a newspaper based in Laurinburg, North Carolina covering Laurinburg and Scotland County. It was established in 1882 as a weekly publication. The newspaper is currently published Tuesday through Saturday.

The Exchange was previously owned by Heartland Publications. In 2012 Versa Capital Management merged Heartland Publications, Ohio Community Media, the former Freedom papers it had acquired, and Impressions Media into a new company, Civitas Media. Civitas Media sold its properties in the Carolinas to Champion Media in 2017.

== History ==
The Laurinburg Exchange was founded in 1882. The paper was originally published on Thursday each week, but is now published Tuesday through Saturday.

The current editor, W. Curt Vincent, assumed the position in July 2018. Vincent has had 37 years of experience in the newspaper industry, holding positions like stringer, reporter, editor, and publisher.

== See also ==
- List of newspapers in North Carolina
