= The Mecklenburg Times =

- Type: Daily newspaper
- Owner: BridgeTower Media
- Publisher: Grady Johnson
- Editor: Scott Baughman
- Founded: 1923
- Headquarters: 130 North McDowell Street, Suite B Charlotte, NC 28204
- City: Charlotte
- Country: United States
- ISSN: 1933-7345
- OCLC number: 13877980
- Website: mecktimes.com

The Mecklenburg Times is an American, English language daily newspaper headquartered in Charlotte, Mecklenburg County, North Carolina. The newspaper was founded in 1923 and is a member of the North Carolina Press Association.

== See also ==
- List of newspapers in North Carolina
