= Agnes Israelson =

American politician

Agnes Israelson (July 22, 1896 – October 30, 1989) was the first woman in Minnesota to serve as a city mayor.

In the October 29, 1953, issue of the Thief River Falls Times, the paper reported that Mrs. Israelson had beaten Harry Simonson, who had been seeking a fourth term as mayor of Thief River Falls, 1,204 to 978.
