= Fuquay-Varina Independent =

Defunct newspaper

- Type: Weekly newspaper
- Format: Broadsheet
- Owner: Civitas Media
- Publisher: Wendy Welker
- Editor: Janet Kangas
- Ceased publication: August 1, 2013; 12 years ago
- Language: English
- Headquarters: 209 E. Vance Street, Fuquay-Varina, North Carolina
- Sister newspapers: Garner News, Cleveland Post, Apex Herald and Holly Springs Sun
- OCLC number: 30539174
- Website: fuquay-varinaindependent.com

Fuquay-Varina Independent was a weekly newspaper based in Fuquay-Varina, North Carolina. It closed in 2013.

An interview in the paper with former United States Attorney James Proctor, dated November 28, 1984, is cited by Errol Morris in his book about the Jeffrey MacDonald murder case, A Wilderness of Error. Proctor was involved in the investigation of MacDonald, and the onetime son-in-law of District Judge Franklin T. Dupree, Jr., who presided at MacDonald's trial. The Independent is identified as Proctor's "hometown newspaper".
