= Plainsman (South Dakota) =

Newspaper in Huron, South Dakota, US

Huron Plainsman
- Front Page of the Nov. 6, 2012, edition
- Type: Daily newspaper
- Format: Berliner
- Owner: Champion Media
- Publisher: Shaun Sarvis
- Editor: Benjamin Chase
- Staff writers: 4
- Founded: January 4, 1886
- Language: English
- Headquarters: Huron Plainsman; 49 Third Street; Huron, South Dakota 57350
- Circulation: 6,206 (as of 2015)
- Website: plainsman.com

The Daily Plainsman, also referred to as the Plainsman, is a newspaper in Huron, South Dakota, founded in 1886. The paper is owned by Champion Media.

== History ==
On January 3, 1886, the Daily Huronite was first published by Augustine Davis, John Longstaff and H.E. Crouch. In 1909, W.S. Bowen and son George H. Bowen acquired the Daily Huronite and State Spirit from Longstaff and then consolidated the two. In 1922, W.S. Bowen died.

In 1926, Willard C. Lusk and Charles H.J. Mitchell bought the Evening Huronite from G.H. Bowen. At that time the two also owned the Yankton Daily Press & Dakotan and Rapid City Journal. In 1936, Robert D. Lusk bought out Mitchell. His father died in 1940, and he inherited the company. In 1946, the Huronite was renamed to The Daily Plainsman. In 1962, R.D. Lusk died, and in 1967 he was posthumously inducted into the South Dakota Newspaper Hall of Fame.

The newspaper was acquired from the Lusk family by Freedom Newspapers in 1980, the Omaha World-Herald Company in 1989, and News Media Corporation in 1999. The company ceased and shuttered the paper on August 6, 2025. The Plainsman restarted publication after it was sold to Champion Media, alongside three other South Dakota papers.
