= The News of Orange County =

Hillsborough based newspaper of northern Orange County, North Carolina

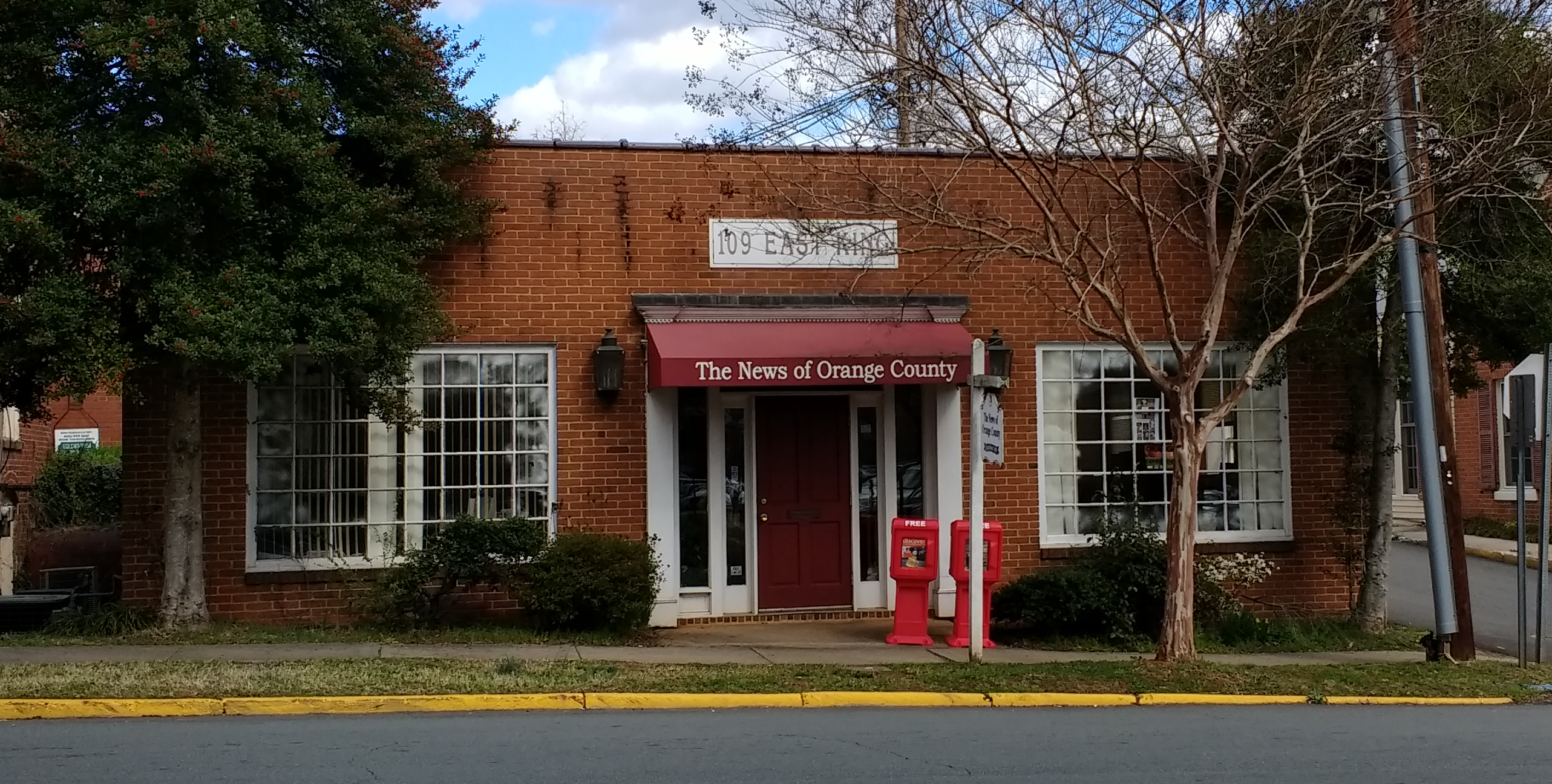
- Type: Weekly newspaper
- Owner: Womack Publishing
- Editor: Charlotte Wray
- Founded: 1893
- Language: English
- Headquarters: Hillsborough, N.C.
- Circulation: 4,200
- Website: newsoforange.com

The News of Orange County is a weekly newspaper based in Hillsborough, North Carolina covering northern Orange County, North Carolina. Started in 1893, the newspaper is owned by Womack Publishing Company of Chatham, Virginia. In 2018, the circulation was 4,200. Charlotte Wray is the publisher.

The newspaper focuses on community news, with an emphasis on local business, Orange County government, and local school coverage. The newspaper also features commentary from elected officials, a "Word on the Street" calendar, local church announcements, and police reports from the Hillsborough Police Department and the Orange County Sheriff's Office.

In January 2024, Womack Publishing announced The News of Orange at the end of the month will merge with the Mebane Enterprise.
