= Champion Media =

North Carolina newspaper conglomerate

Champion Media is a Media conglomerate headquartered in Mooresville, North Carolina. It was founded in 2017.

== History ==
Champion Media was founded by Scott Champion and his son Corey Champion in 2017. According to the company's management, Champion was founded with the purpose of alleviating the decline of newspapers. Specifically, by acquiring publications from large corporations. Then providing "back end support" such as accounting and human resources to the acquired papers, while leaving editorial and advertising to the paper's management.

In June 2017, Champion Media acquired five dallies and 17 weeklies from based in North and South Carolina from Civitas Media. In October 2017, the company sold its recently acquired Mount Airy based papers to Adams MultiMedia. In February 2018, the Maysville Ledger Independent was acquired from Lee Enterprises. In August 2019, the Times Leader was acquired by Avant Publications, a joint venture of Champion Media and MIDTC.

In June 2025, Champion Media paid a $102,500 settlement after a lawsuit by the Equal Employment Opportunity Commission, which alleged that they canceled an interview with a deaf job applicant, due to the candidate's deafness. In August 2025, they acquired four South Dakota newspapers after the bankruptcy of News Media Corporation. This was met with a largely positive response, though some were concerned that Champion would make the same mistakes as NMC.

== Publications ==
Title	Location
The Anson Record	Wadesboro, North Carolina
The Bladen Journal	Elizabethtown, North Carolina
The Brookings Register	Brookings, South Dakota
Brown County Press	Williamsburg, Ohio
Clermont Sun	Williamsburg, Ohio
Devils Lake Journal	Devils Lake, North Dakota
Discover Barrington	Deer Park, Illinois
Herald-Advocate	Bennettsville, South Carolina
Huron Plainsman	Huron, South Dakota
Laurinburg Exchange	Laurinburg, North Carolina
Maysville Ledger Independent	Maysville, Kentucky
Moody County Enterprise	Flandreau, South Dakota
Mount Olive Tribune	Clinton, North Carolina
Newberry Observer	Newberry, South Carolina
News Democrat	Williamsburg, Ohio
People’s Defender	West Union, Ohio
Redfield Press	Redfield, South Dakota
Richmond County Daily Journal	Rockingham, North Carolina
Ripley Bee	Williamsburg, Ohio
The Robesonian	Lumberton, North Carolina
Sampson Independent	Clinton, North Carolina
Sentinel Progress	Easley, South Carolina
Thief River Falls Times	Thief River Falls, Minnesota
