= The Daily Record (North Carolina) =

American newspaper

Coordinates: 35.308502°N 78.610956°W

- Type: Daily newspaper
- Owner: Record Publishing Company
- Publisher: Bart Adams
- Editor: Emily Weaver
- Founded: 1950
- Language: American English
- Headquarters: 99 West Broad Street, Dunn, North Carolina 28334
- City: Dunn, North Carolina
- Country: United States
- OCLC number: 26102332
- Website: mydailyrecord.com

The Daily Record is an American, English language daily (Mon. thru Fri.) newspaper headquartered in Dunn, Harnett County, North Carolina.

== History ==
The Daily Record is a member of the North Carolina Newspaper Association. The newspaper was previously known as:

- The Daily Record. (Dunn, N.C.) 1950-1978, OCLC: 13168584
- The Dunn Dispatch. (Dunn, N.C.) 1914-1978, OCLC: 26794344

== See also ==
- List of newspapers in North Carolina
- Wilmington massacre - The Daily Record was burned by a mob
