= Kannapolis Citizen =

- Type: Newspaper
- Founded: 2003
- Language: English
- Ceased publication: 2010
- Headquarters: Kannapolis, North Carolina
- Website: kannapoliscitizen.com

Kannapolis Citizen was a newspaper based in Kannapolis, North Carolina covering Cabarrus, Mecklenburg, and Rowan counties. The paper started circulation in mid-2003. As of 2010, the paper was no longer in business.
