= Stanly News Journal =

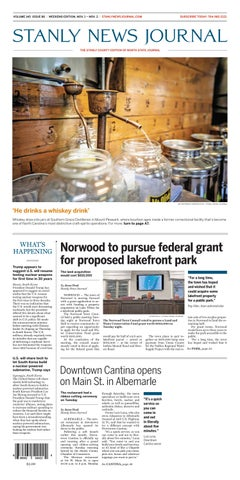
- The November 1, 2025, front page of Stanly News Journal
- Type: Biweekly newspaper
- Owner: North State Media LLC
- Publisher: Trip Hoffend
- Editor: Jordan Golson
- Founded: 1880 (as "The Second Century")
- Language: English
- Headquarters: 1548 Highway 24/27 Bypass West, Albemarle, NC 28001
- Circulation: 5,000 Tuesday; 6,100 Sunday
- Sister newspapers: North State Journal
- Website: thesnaponline.com

Stanly News Journal is a newspaper published on Wednesday and Saturday in Stanly County, North Carolina, USA.

== History ==
The Second Century was published for the first time June 10, 1880. The connection between this paper and The Stanly Gleaner, published in Norwood, is not clear, but it was believed the Gleaner used equipment from The Second Century. Investors took over the Gleaner and changed the name to The Stanly Observer. John R. Elkins was the first publisher.

In 1890, The Old Armchair Club bought the paper and made J.D. Bivins editor and publisher; the paper's name was changed to The Stanly News. T. J. Jerome bought the paper in 1893. Editor R.A. Crowell changed the name to The Stanly Enterprise. Bivins bought the paper in 1898.

In 1912, the paper's name changed to the Albemarle Enterprise. W.A. Bivins replaced J.D. Bivins as editor. By 1918, the name had changed again, to the Albemarle News.

J.D. Bivins took over once again December 10, 1919, and the next day the News merged with the Stanly County Herald, started that year with A.C. Huneycutt as editor. Huneycutt remained in his position with the Stanly News-Herald.

Bivins sold his share of the News-Herald in 1920, and in 1922 bought the Piedmont Press, which became the Albemarle Press. Bivins became president of Press Printing Company in 1927, with S.R. Andrew the vice-president and Press editor John B. Harris secretary-treasurer. Press Printing bought the News-Herald, and on December 3, 1929, the papers merged to become the Stanly News and Press.

On November 1, 2017, the newspaper's purchase by Albemarle Newsmedia LLC (Boone Newspapers, Inc. and Carpenter Newsmedia LLC) from Community Newspaper Holdings Inc. became final.

On October 23, 2018, Roger Watson took over as publisher when Sandy Selvy-Mullis left after 11 years.

North State Media, publisher of the Stanly County Journal, a local edition of the North State Journal, bought the News and Press and planned to combine the two papers. The name was then changed to the Stanly News Journal in May 2025.

In August 2025, publisher Neal Robbins was appointed by President Donald Trump as Deputy Under Secretary for Rural Development at the U.S. Department of Agriculture. Trip Hoffend, who was previously president of Charlotte Publishing Company, became publisher of the newspaper after Robbins departed for the Department of Agriculture.
