= Thief River Falls Times =

Weekly news publication in Thief River Falls, Minnesota

- Type: Weekly newspaper
- Owner: Champion Media
- Publisher: Traci Joppru
- Editor: April Scheinoha
- Founded: 1889
- Language: English
- Headquarters: 324 Main Ave N
- City: Thief River Falls, Minnesota
- Website: trftimes.com

The Thief River Falls Times is a weekly news publication based in Thief River Falls, Minnesota. Its original organization was founded in 1889. The paper is owned by Champion Media.

== History ==
The first newspaper to be published in Thief River Falls was The Press in 1889. The second paper, The News, began publication in 1890 in Red Lake Falls, Minnesota, as the Red Lake Falls Times, then moved to Thief River Falls in 1893 and changed its name to the Thief River Falls News. Yet another paper, The Review, began operations in 1903. In 1905, The Review and The Press merged, and in 1912, The News and The Press merged to form News-Press. In 1911, the Thief River Falls Times was formed with the intent on taking over the two papers. In 1917, The Times succeeded in purchasing News-Press and began publishing papers under Thief River Falls Times.

By late summer of 1923, The Times had suffered two fires, both wiping out their publishing facilities. The Times, after the first fire, was being printed at The Tribune, another newspaper at the time. But tensions rose between the two papers and, after the second fire, costs of that fire resulted in a front page plea to subscribers to subscribe for a year or more to help pay for costs of rebuilding. The Times was sold to the owners of the Warren Sheaf later that year who had printed The Times for a short time after the second fire.

In 1927, The Times was consolidated with rival paper, The Tribune. Former owner of The Tribune, William Dahlquist, stayed on as editor and part owner of The Times. Another rival paper, The Forum, was operated in Thief River Falls from 1933 to 1936, then renamed the Tri-County Forum from 1936 to 1943, when it closed.

In 1965, The Times moved to its current location on Main Avenue North. From 1968 on, The Times published semi-weekly papers and printed other area papers.

After publishing two papers a week since for 22 years in 1990, The Times renamed one of the weekly publications The Northern Watch, which it publishes on Saturdays.
