= Kings Mountain Herald =

- Type: Weekly newspaper
- Founder(s): William Andrew Mauney
- Founded: 1886
- Headquarters: 503 North Lafayette Street Shelby, NC 28150
- OCLC number: 40227001
- Website: kmherald.com

The Kings Mountain Herald is a weekly newspaper based in Kings Mountain, North Carolina. It was established in 1886 by William Andrew Mauney.
