= Island Gazette =

- Printing the News and Raising Hell Since 1978!
- Type: Weekly newspaper
- Owner: Seaside Press Co. Inc.
- Publisher: Roger McKee
- Founded: 1978
- Ceased publication: March 2023
- Language: English
- Headquarters: 1003 Bennet Lane Suite F, Carolina Beach, North Carolina United States
- Circulation: 10,000+ depending on Season.
- Website: islandgazette.net

Island Gazette was a weekly newspaper covering local news, state news, obituaries, real estate statistics, and classifieds based in Carolina Beach, North Carolina from 1979 to 2023. The newspaper was owned by Seaside Press Co. Inc.

== History ==
The Island Gazette was founded and run by the McKee family since 1978. Owner Roger Mckee shuttered the newspaper in March 2023.
