= Hickory Daily Record =

Newspaper in North Carolina, USA

- Type: Daily newspaper
- Owner: Lee Enterprises
- Publisher: Tim Dearman, Terry Coomes
- Editor: Eric Millsaps
- Managing editor: Jon LaFontaine
- Founded: September 11, 1915; 110 years ago
- Language: English
- City: Hickory, North Carolina
- Country: United States
- Circulation: 8,237 Daily (as of 2023)
- Sister newspapers: Winston-Salem Journal, Statesville Record & Landmark, Morganton News-Herald, Concord Independent/Tribune
- ISSN: 1061-5628
- OCLC number: 13340814
- Website: hickoryrecord.com

Hickory Daily Record is an American, English language daily newspaper based in Hickory, North Carolina, US. It is owned by Lee Enterprises. The newspaper is a member of the North Carolina Press Association.

The newspaper serves the city of Hickory along with Catawba County and Burke, as well as the neighboring Alexander and Caldwell counties.

In 2019, the circulation was 9,372 (weekend) and 7,853 (daily).

Starting June 6, 2023, the print edition of the newspaper will be reduced to three days a week: Tuesday, Thursday and Saturday. Also, the newspaper will transition from being delivered by a traditional newspaper delivery carrier to mail delivery by the U.S. Postal Service.

== See also ==
- List of newspapers in North Carolina
