= Shallotte, North Carolina =

Town in North Carolina, United States

- Town
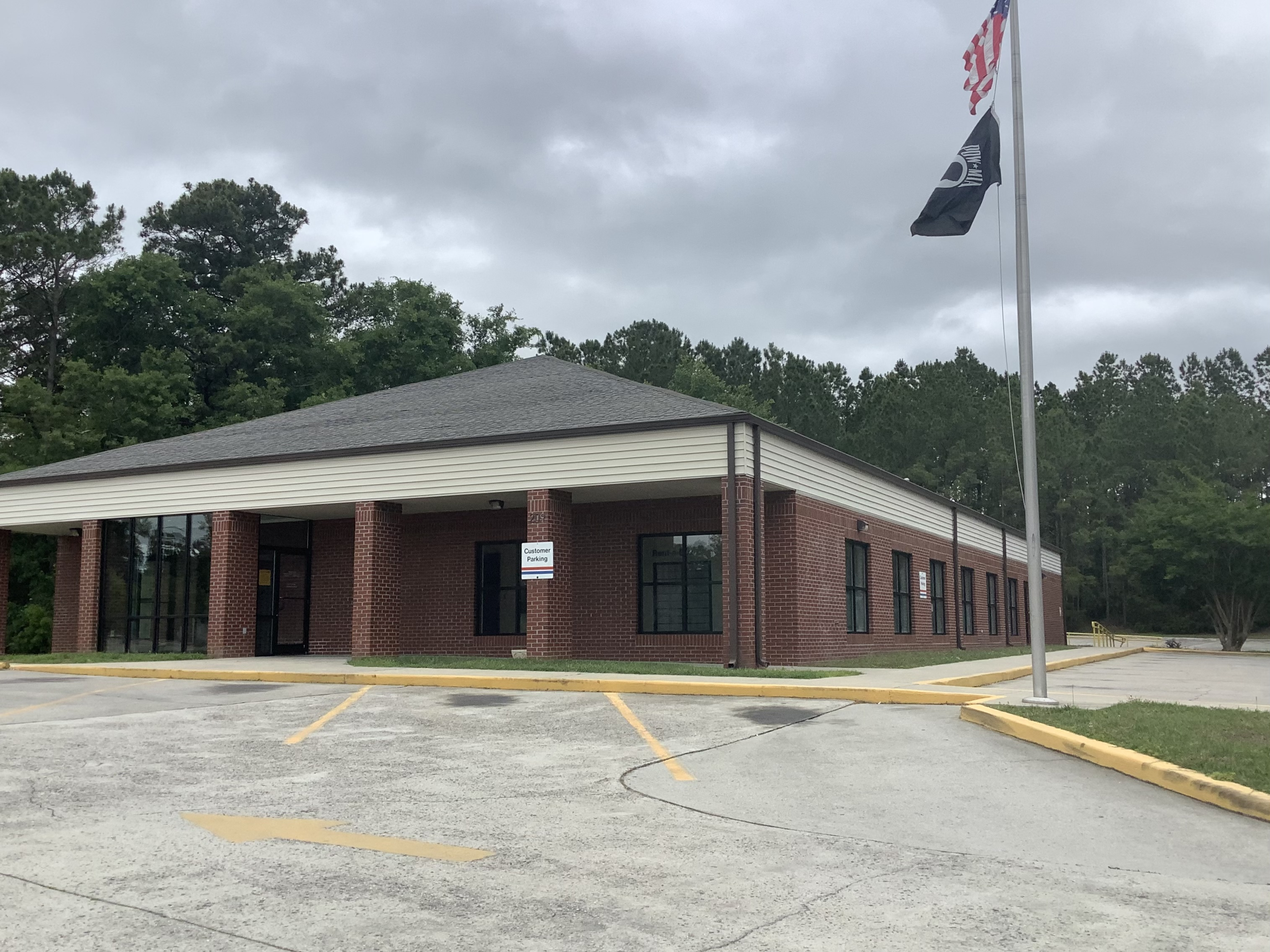
- Post office

- Flag Seal

- Location within the state of North Carolina
- Coordinates: 33°58′36″N 78°22′51″W
- Country: United States
- State: North Carolina
- County: Brunswick
- Incorporated: 1899

Government
  - Mayor: Art Dornfeld

Area
  - Total: 9.31 sq mi (24.10 km^{2})
  - Land: 9.24 sq mi (23.93 km^{2})
  - Water: 0.062 sq mi (0.16 km^{2})
- Elevation: 26 ft (7.9 m)

Population (2020)
  - Total: 4,185
  - Density: 452.9/sq mi (174.86/km^{2})
- Time zone: UTC−5 (Eastern Standard)
  - Summer (DST): UTC−4 (Eastern Daylight)
- ZIP code: 28470
- Area codes: 910, 472
- FIPS code: 37-60800
- GNIS feature ID: 2407319
- Website: www.townofshallotte.org

Shallotte (/ʃəˈloʊt/ shə-LOHT) is a town in western Brunswick County, North Carolina, United States. As of the 2020 census, Shallotte had a population of 4,185. The Shallotte River passes through the town.

== History ==
Shallotte was incorporated as a town in 1899.

The Grille, a restaurant located on Main Street, was used as a filming location for the robbery scene in the Melissa McCarthy film Tammy (2014). It closed in 2016.

== Geography ==
Shallotte is located in west-central Brunswick County. U.S. Route 17 (Ocean Highway) passes through the town, bypassing the town center to the northwest. (Main Street is designated US 17 Business.) US 17 leads northeast 33 miles (53 km) to Wilmington and southwest 38 miles (61 km) to Myrtle Beach, South Carolina.

According to the United States Census Bureau, the town has a total area of 9.3 square miles (24.2 km^{2}), of which 9.3 square miles (24.1 km^{2}) is land and 0.08 square miles (0.2 km^{2}), or 0.72%, is water.

=== Climate ===
Climate data for SHALLOTTE AG, NC, 1991-2020 normals
| Month | Jan | Feb | Mar | Apr | May | Jun | Jul | Aug | Sep | Oct | Nov | Dec | Year |
|---|---|---|---|---|---|---|---|---|---|---|---|---|---|
| Mean daily maximum °F (°C) | 55.6 (13.1) | 58.1 (14.5) | 65.2 (18.4) | 72.0 (22.2) | 78.4 (25.8) | 83.6 (28.7) | 87.2 (30.7) | 86.0 (30.0) | 82.4 (28.0) | 74.3 (23.5) | 65.2 (18.4) | 58.5 (14.7) | 72.2 (22.3) |
| Daily mean °F (°C) | 46.0 (7.8) | 48.3 (9.1) | 54.5 (12.5) | 62.5 (16.9) | 70.0 (21.1) | 76.5 (24.7) | 80.1 (26.7) | 78.9 (26.1) | 74.7 (23.7) | 65.2 (18.4) | 55.0 (12.8) | 48.9 (9.4) | 63.4 (17.4) |
| Mean daily minimum °F (°C) | 36.4 (2.4) | 38.6 (3.7) | 43.8 (6.6) | 52.9 (11.6) | 61.5 (16.4) | 69.3 (20.7) | 73.1 (22.8) | 71.8 (22.1) | 66.9 (19.4) | 56.0 (13.3) | 44.7 (7.1) | 39.4 (4.1) | 54.5 (12.5) |
| Average precipitation inches (mm) | 3.79 (96) | 3.58 (91) | 4.17 (106) | 3.52 (89) | 3.83 (97) | 4.48 (114) | 5.19 (132) | 6.87 (174) | 9.66 (245) | 4.24 (108) | 3.55 (90) | 3.65 (93) | 56.53 (1,436) |
| Average precipitation days (≥ 0.01 in) | 7.7 | 8.0 | 7.9 | 7.6 | 8.2 | 8.0 | 8.5 | 10.4 | 7.9 | 6.7 | 7.1 | 9.0 | 97.0 |
Source: NOAA

== Demographics ==
Historical population
| Census | Pop. | Note | %± |
|---|---|---|---|
| 1900 | 149 | | — |
| 1910 | 139 | | −6.7% |
| 1920 | 174 | | 25.2% |
| 1930 | 214 | | 23.0% |
| 1940 | 381 | | 78.0% |
| 1950 | 493 | | 29.4% |
| 1960 | 480 | | −2.6% |
| 1970 | 597 | | 24.4% |
| 1980 | 680 | | 13.9% |
| 1990 | 965 | | 41.9% |
| 2000 | 1,381 | | 43.1% |
| 2010 | 3,675 | | 166.1% |
| 2020 | 4,185 | | 13.9% |
U.S. Decennial Census

=== 2020 census ===
As of the 2020 census, Shallotte had a population of 4,185. The median age was 49.7 years. 18.4% of residents were under the age of 18 and 28.7% of residents were 65 years of age or older. For every 100 females there were 81.3 males, and for every 100 females age 18 and over there were 77.8 males age 18 and over.

0.0% of residents lived in urban areas, while 100.0% lived in rural areas.

There were 1,814 households in Shallotte, of which 25.9% had children under the age of 18 living in them. Of all households, 49.8% were married-couple households, 12.1% were households with a male householder and no spouse or partner present, and 32.0% were households with a female householder and no spouse or partner present. About 27.9% of all households were made up of individuals and 14.4% had someone living alone who was 65 years of age or older.

There were 1,946 housing units, of which 6.8% were vacant. The homeowner vacancy rate was 1.4% and the rental vacancy rate was 4.8%.

Shallotte racial composition
| Race | Number | Percentage |
|---|---|---|
| White (non-Hispanic) | 3,326 | 79.47% |
| Black or African American (non-Hispanic) | 399 | 9.53% |
| Native American | 32 | 0.76% |
| Asian | 53 | 1.27% |
| Pacific Islander | 3 | 0.07% |
| Other/Mixed | 189 | 4.52% |
| Hispanic or Latino | 183 | 4.37% |

=== 2010 census ===
As of the census of 2010, there were 3,675 people, 1,583 households, and 985 families living in the town. The population density was 680.5 inhabitants per square mile (262.7/km^{2}). There were 1,908 housing units with a density of 353.3 per square mile (136.3/km^{2}). The racial makeup of the town was 85.2% White, 9.3% African American, 1.3% Asian, 0.6% Native American, 2.0% from other races, and 1.6% from two or more races. Hispanic or Latino of any race were 4.8% of the population.

There were 1,583 households, out of which 23.2% had children under the age of 18 living with them, 46.5% were married couples living together, 12.1% had a female householder with no husband present, and 37.8% were non-families. 31.7% of all households were made up of individuals, and 14.5% had someone living alone who was 65 years of age or older. The average household size was 2.24 and the average family size was 2.78.

The town population was distributed with 22.8% under the age of 20, 22.5% from 20 to 40, 32.2% from 40 to 65, and 22.4% aged 65 and over. The median age was 43.9 years. For every 100 females, there were 85.8 males. For every 100 females age 18 and over, there were 79.1 males.

The median income for a household in the town was $41,616, and the median income for a family was $52,284. Males had a median income of $36,591 versus $30,000 for females. The per capita income for the town was $23,397. About 4.7% of families and 10.2% of the population were below the poverty line, including 3.4% of those under age 18 and 7.7% of those age 65 or over.

== Media ==
- Brunswick Beacon, weekly newspaper
