= North State Journal =

Newspaper in North Carolina

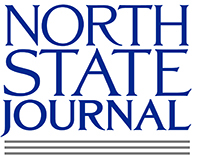

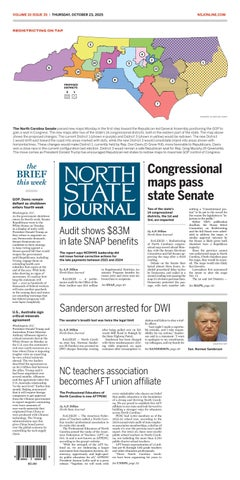
- North State Journal Front Page October 22, 2025
- Type: Newspaper
- Format: Broadsheet
- Owner(s): North State Media, LLC
- Publisher: Trip Hoffend
- Editor: Cory Lavalette
- Founded: 2016
- Headquarters: Raleigh, North Carolina
- Country: United States
- ISSN: 2471-1365
- Website: nsjonline.com

The North State Journal is a statewide newspaper in North Carolina founded in 2016 by Neal Robbins.

The newspaper is headquartered in Raleigh, North Carolina. North State Journal is owned by North State Media, LLC and is published by Neal Robbins, formerly of the North Carolina Department of Environment and Natural Resources (now DEQ). Robbins credited DENR Secretary John Skvarla as the inspiration for the newspaper being in print.

== History ==
The North State Journal launched in 2016 and at the time had 16 journalists and 10 business-side staff.

In May 2023, the paper's parent company North State Media acquired The Chatham Record in Chatham County, N.C.

In September 2023, McClatchy sold its Charlotte printing plant to North State Media for $4.65 million. The sale was publicly announced in August. The plant was developed by The Wall Street Journal in 1982 and sold to the Charlotte Observer’s parent company in 2013. Following the sale, the plant's 30-member staff will stay on at the newly established Charlotte Publishing Company.

In May 2025, North State Media acquired Stanly News Journal in Albemarle, N.C. from Carpenter Media Group.

In August 2025, founder Neal Robbins was appointed by President Donald Trump as Deputy Under Secretary for Rural Development at the U.S. Department of Agriculture. Trip Hoffend, who was previously president of Charlotte Publishing Company, became publisher of the newspaper after Robbins departed for the Department of Agriculture. Hoffend stated in an editorial in the newspaper that the direction of the newspaper would not change and "our goals remain the same."

== Content ==
Founder Neal Robbins stated to the Charlotte Observer that North State Journal is not partisan, and that it aims for objectivity.

The North State Journal's opinion section consists only of bylined columns emphasizes "free markets and individual liberty" compared with "center-left" leaning opinion sections of North Carolina’s other major papers. In 2017, the paper published two issues per week, on Sunday and Wednesday.

== Awards ==
In 2024, North State Journal received 16 awards from the North Carolina Press Association, including seven first place awards and First Place for General Excellence in Division B.

North State Journal collected 19 awards from the North Carolina Press Association in 2022, including third place for General Excellence in the small weekly category. The paper won the General Excellence Award as the best small weekly in the state in 2018 and 2020 as well as second place in 2019.
