= North Carolina Press Association =

Nonprofit newspaper association

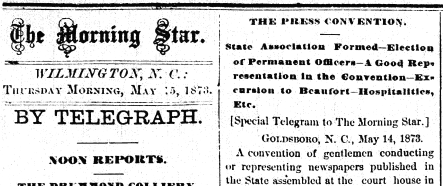
Announcement of the first convention of the North Carolina Press Association in 1873

The North Carolina Press Association (NCPA) is an American, nonprofit organization devoted to protecting and promoting newspapers and freedom of the press in the state of North Carolina. It was established in 1872 in Charlotte, North Carolina and met for its first convention on May 14, 1873 in Goldsboro, North Carolina. The founding father and first president of the NCPA was Joseph Adolphus Engelhard, of the Wilmington Journal. (Note: The Wilmington Journal was a newspaper in Wilmington, North Carolina from 1844–1895. ISSN 2379-030X).

== History ==
At the suggestion of Joseph Adolphus Engelhard, the North Carolina newspaper journalist met in Charlotte, North Carolina in 1872 to organize an association that would become the NCPA. On May 14, 1873, the first convention of the NCPA was held in the court house on Walnut Street in Goldsboro, North Carolina. Joseph A. Engelhard was the first president of the association. Engelhard was a veteran of the Civil War, railroad owner, and owner of the now defunct Wilmington Star newspaper.

The original motives for the formation of the North Carolina Press Association in 1873 was the concern about quack advertising and the need to form a fraternity for newspaper persons. The association held annual meetings and often provided recommendations to the North Carolina General Assembly on issues such as improving education, post offices and roads; the need for accurate information about state resources such as minerals; poor reading habits in the state; and improving the profession of journalism in the state.

Since 1929, the NCPA has held annual contents in news reporting. In 1949, the NCPA organized a School of Journalism Foundation, Inc. that aided in the development of the school of journalism at the University of North Carolina at Chapel Hill. In the later part of the 1900s, the NCPA became an advocate for First Amendment freedom, especially concerning full access to government and judicial information.

The NCPA has a 12-member board of directors that is headquartered in Raleigh, North Carolina.The North Carolina General Assembly is vigorously lobbying the organization on matters of journalistic interest.

== Membership ==
Membership in the North Carolina Press Association includes almost all North Carolina state, county, and community newspapers; collegiate members; and corporate/associate members.

The NCPA is located physically at 5171 Glenwood Ave, Raleigh, North Carolina. The NCPA has a presence on Facebook for communicating with members and the public.

== Bibliography ==
- Parker, Roy Jr. (1998). "North Carolina Press Foundation".
- Belk, Henry. "Press Association Active in Promoting State Papers". The E.S.C. Quarterly 9. No.1-2. Winter-Spring 1951. p.34.
- North Carolina Press Association Records, 1886-1993. The Southern Historical Collection, University of North Carolina at Chapel Hill.
- Sherrill, J.B., ed. (1930). Historical Records: North Carolina Press Association 1873-1887. North Carolina Press Association.
