= Quaker Man =

The Quaker Man may refer to:

- The mascot of Guilford College
- The logo of the Quaker Oats Company
