= Nereus Mendenhall =

American politician and educator (1819–1893)

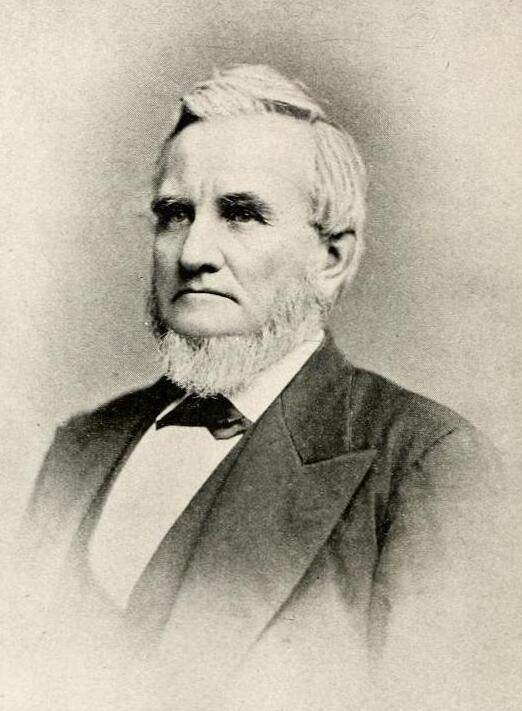
- Mendenhall in an 1893 publication

Member of the North Carolina House of Representatives from the Guilford County district
- In office 1874–1875 Serving with John N. Staples

Personal details
- Born: August 14, 1819 Jamestown, North Carolina, U.S.
- Died: October 29, 1893 (aged 74) Jamestown, North Carolina, U.S.
- Party: Democratic
- Spouse: Oriana Wilson (m. 1851; died 1890)
- Children: Mary Mendenhall Hobbs
- Relatives: Aaron Marshall Elliott (nephew)
- Education: Haverford College; Jefferson Medical College
- Occupation: Politician; educator; engineer

Nereus Mendenhall (August 14, 1819 – October 29, 1893) was an American politician and educator from North Carolina. He was principal of New Garden Boarding School (later Guilford College) and served as a member of the North Carolina House of Representatives. He was a member of the Quaker delegation that petitioned North Carolina and the Confederate States Congress for exemption from military duty for Quakers during the Civil War.

== Early life ==
Nereus Mendenhall was born on August 14, 1819, in Jamestown, North Carolina, as the fourth child to Mary (née Pegg) and Richard Mendenhall. His great-grandfather was James Mendenhall, the namesake of Jamestown. His parents were Quakers. At the age of 13, he was sent to Greensboro to study the printer's trade under Lyndon Swaim. He entered Haverford College in 1837 and graduated in 1839. In 1845, he graduated from the Jefferson Medical College.

== Career ==
Mendenhall became licensed to practice medicine and practiced for a time before leaving the field. He was principal and instructor of New Garden Boarding School (later Guilford College), founded by the Friends of North Carolina, from 1839 to 1842 and from 1846 to 1847. He left teaching and worked as a civil engineer and surveyed railroads in North Carolina and South Carolina, primarily the railroad from Salisbury to Asheville. In 1860, he returned as principal of the New Garden School. He integrated the education of boys and girls. He continued as principal until 1866.

As a Quaker, Mendenhall was opposed to the Civil War. In April 1862, he led a five-member Quaker delegation to petition the North Carolina Assembly and the Confederate States Congress to exempt Quakers from the conscription act. North Carolina first passed an act of exemption, releasing them from state military duty for US$100 each. On October 11, 1862, the Confederate States Congress passed a law to exempt Quakers from military duty after payment of US$500 or providing services in connection with hospitals. The delegation also visited Jefferson Davis who expressed regret that the Quakers would not fight for the Confederacy.

In 1870, Mendenhall was elected with D. F. Caldwell to represent Guilford County in a convention on the North Carolina constitution, but the convention was not held. He served two terms as a Democrat in the North Carolina House of Representatives, including a term from 1874 to 1875. He was the Democratic nominee for the state superintendent of public instruction. He was a member of the commission appointed for the location and construction of the Morganton hospital. In 1876, he rejected the Democratic nomination for the state legislature.

In 1876, Mendenhall was appointed as a faculty member of the William Penn Charter School. He moved to Philadelphia and taught at Haverford College for two years. He served as chairman of the board of examiners of public school teachers in Guilford County for more than 40 years.

== Personal life ==
Mendenhall married Oriana Wilson in 1851. His daughter was educator and suffragist Mary Mendenhall Hobbs. His wife died in 1890. His nephew was Aaron Marshall Elliott.

Mendenhall died on October 29, 1893, aged 74, at the home of his sister in Jamestown.
