= Aaron Elliott =

Aaron Elliott may refer to:

- Aaron Cometbus (Aaron Elliott, born 1968), American musician, songwriter, and magazine editor
- Aaron Marshall Elliott (1844–1910), American novelist and professor at Johns Hopkins University
