= Winston Craig =

American football player (born 1995)

No. 74, 96, 64
- Position: Defensive end

Personal information
- Born: July 25, 1995 (age 31); Greensboro, North Carolina, U.S.
- Listed height: 6 ft 4 in (1.93 m)
- Listed weight: 290 lb (132 kg)

Career information
- High school: Ragsdale (Jamestown, North Carolina)
- College: Richmond (2013–2016)
- NFL draft: 2017: undrafted

Career history
- Philadelphia Eagles (2017–2018)*; San Antonio Commanders (2019); Pittsburgh Steelers (2019)*; Dallas Renegades (2020)
- * Offseason or practice squad member only

Awards and highlights
- Second-team All-CAA (2015); First-team All-CAA (2016)
- Stats at Pro Football Reference

Winston Craig (born July 25, 1995) is an American former football defensive end. He played college football at Richmond.

== College career ==
Over the course of his college career with the Spiders, Craig appeared in 52 games and recorded 166 tackles, 20.5 tackles for loss, 13.5 sacks and two interceptions.

== Professional career ==
=== Philadelphia Eagles ===
After going undrafted in the 2017 NFL draft, Craig signed with the Philadelphia Eagles on May 11, 2017. On September 1, 2017, he was waived by the Eagles. He was signed to their practice squad on December 7, 2017, after Justin Hamilton signed with the Kansas City Chiefs. He was waived again on January 9, 2018, to make room for Harold Jones-Quartey. As a result, he was not part of the Eagles when they won the Super Bowl. Craig was re-signed to the Eagles on February 20, 2018.

On September 1, 2018, Craig was waived by the Eagles and was signed to the practice squad the next day. He was released on September 7, 2018. He was re-signed to the practice squad on October 16, 2018. Craig was released by the Eagles on November 2, 2018.

=== San Antonio Commanders ===
In December 2018, Craig signed with the San Antonio Commanders of the AAF.

=== Pittsburgh Steelers ===
After the AAF suspended football operations, Craig signed with the Pittsburgh Steelers on April 8, 2019. He was waived on August 31, 2019.

=== Dallas Renegades ===
Craig was selected by the Dallas Renegades in the 2020 XFL draft. He had his contract terminated when the league suspended operations on April 10, 2020.
