= Aaron Marshall Elliott =

American writer, philologist and professor (1844–1910)

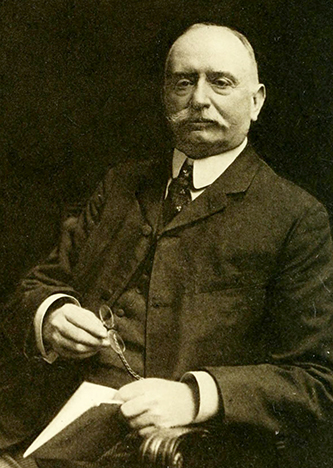
- Born: January 24, 1844; Pasquotank County, North Carolina, U.S.
- Died: November 9, 1910 (aged 66); Baltimore, Maryland, U.S.
- Resting place: Green Mount Cemetery
- Education: Haverford College; Harvard University (BA); Ecole des Hautes-Etudes; Istituto di Studi Superiori di Firenze; Complutense University of Madrid; Ludwig-Maximilians-Universität München; University of Tübingen; University of Vienna; Princeton University (PhD)
- Occupations: Novelist; educator
- Relatives: Nereus Mendenhall (uncle)

Aaron Marshall Elliott (24 January 1844 – 9 November 1910) was an American novelist and professor at Johns Hopkins University. He was one of the founders of the Modern Language Association.

== Early life ==
Aaron Marshall Elliott was born on 24 January 1844, in Pasquotank County, North Carolina, to Rhoda (née Mendenhall) and Aaron Elliott. He attended school in North Carolina. From a Unionist family, Elliott moved north in 1862 to evade service in the Confederacy. In late 1861, he studied at New Garden Boarding School (later Guilford College), where his uncle Nereus Mendenhall taught. He graduated from Haverford College in 1866 and then taught briefly in the South. In 1867, he joined Harvard University as a senior and graduated as a Bachelor of Arts in 1868. He later graduated from the Ludwig-Maximilians-Universität München. He was a tutor to a Boston family in Paris for two years and studied at Collège de France's Ecole des Hautes-Etudes in Paris from 1868 to 1871. From 1871 to 1872, he studied at the Istituto di Studi Superiori in Florence. He studied at the Complutense University of Madrid in 1873 and the Ludwig-Maximilians-Universität München, the University of Tübingen, and the University of Vienna from 1874 to 1876. He graduated with a doctoral degree from Princeton University with a PhD in 1877.

== Career ==
In 1876, Elliott joined Johns Hopkins University as an associate professor of Romance languages. He established a doctoral program by 1884. He was promoted to full professor in 1892. He was known for developing the new science of philology. Elliott was one of the founders of the Modern Language Association and its review, the Publication of the Modern Language Association. He served as its secretary for seven years and president for one year. He was the editor of Modern Language Notes. He was a delegate to the 1900 Paris Exposition.

Elliott was also a member of the Archaeological Institute of America, American Philological Association, American Philological Society, American Oriental Society, Maryland Historical Society, National Geographical Society, Dante Society, Maryland Society of New York, and the Societe Amicale Gaston Paris of France. He served as president of the Haverford Alumni Association and was president of the North Carolina Society of Baltimore for a year. He was elected to the American Philosophical Society in 1895. He was a clubman. He was president of the Hopkins Club and was a member of the Maryland University and Baltimore County clubs.

== Personal life ==
Elliott married Lily Tyson Manly, daughter of James E. Tyson, of Ellicott City on June 14, 1905. They lived for a period on Eager Street in Baltimore.

Elliott died of stomach cancer on November 9, 1910, at his home on North Calvert Street in Baltimore. He was buried in Green Mount Cemetery.

== Awards and legacy ==
Elliott received an honorary Doctor of Laws from Wake Forest University in 1891 and an honorary Doctor of Laws from Haverford University in 1908. A portrait of Elliott was presented at McCoy Hall at Johns Hopkins University in 1902. In August 1907, he was decorated with the Legion of Honor by the French government.

His will donated US$2,000 for the establishment of the Marshall Elliott Romance Scholarship at Johns Hopkins University.
