= Mary Mendenhall Hobbs =

American Quaker advocate for women's education, temperance and suffrage

- Born: Mary Mendenhall; August 30, 1852; Guilford County, North Carolina
- Died: July 20, 1930 (aged 77); Guilford County, North Carolina
- Occupation: Educator
- Spouse: Lewis Lyndon Hobbs (m. 1880)
- Father: Nereus Mendenhall

Mary Mendenhall Hobbs (August 30, 1852 – July 20, 1930), was an American Quaker advocate for women's education, temperance, and suffrage, based in North Carolina. Her campaigning to improve women's education supported the founding of the University of North Carolina at Greensboro in 1891.

== Early life and education ==
Mary Mendenhall was born near Jamestown, North Carolina, one of the five daughters of Oriana (née Wilson) and Nereus Mendenhall. Her family had a long history as Quaker educators; her father was a physician who was principal at New Garden Friends School in Greensboro, North Carolina. Mary completed her formal education at Miss Howland's School on Lake Cayuga in Union Springs, New York.

== Adult life ==
Mary Mendenhall taught for a few years between school and marriage. She married a childhood friend, Quaker educator Lewis Lyndon Hobbs (1849–1932), in 1880. They had five children together. While raising her children, she remained active in the Quaker community, raising money and advocating for girls' education. Her husband became president of Guilford College in 1888, and she was busy as the president's wife and hostess of campus events, until his retirement from that position in 1915.

Mary Mendenhall Hobbs was active in the Women's Christian Temperance Union. She assisted in editing the state chapter's newsletter, The Anchor, and was state superintendent of the organization's "Department of Hygiene and Heredity." She also lectured and wrote in favor of women's suffrage.

In 1921, the University of North Carolina at Chapel Hill recognized Hobbs' service with an honorary Doctor of Letters degree, "in recognition of her attainments as a scholar and a writer." She was the second woman to be so honored, the first being Cornelia Phillips Spencer.

== Death and legacy ==
She died in 1930, aged 77 years. Her papers are archived as part of the Friends Historical Collection at Guilford College, with further family papers in the Southern Historical Collection in Chapel Hill. There is a Mary Mendenhall Hobbs Residence Hall at Guilford College. Her first-hand descriptions of a girlhood in the South during and after the American Civil War, originally published in 1923 as Civil War and Reconstruction through the Eyes of Mary Mendenhall Hobbs, were reissued in 2012 by the North Carolina Friends Historical Society.
