= Oakdale Cotton Mill Village =

Historic district in North Carolina, United States

- U.S. National Register of Historic Places
- U.S. Historic district
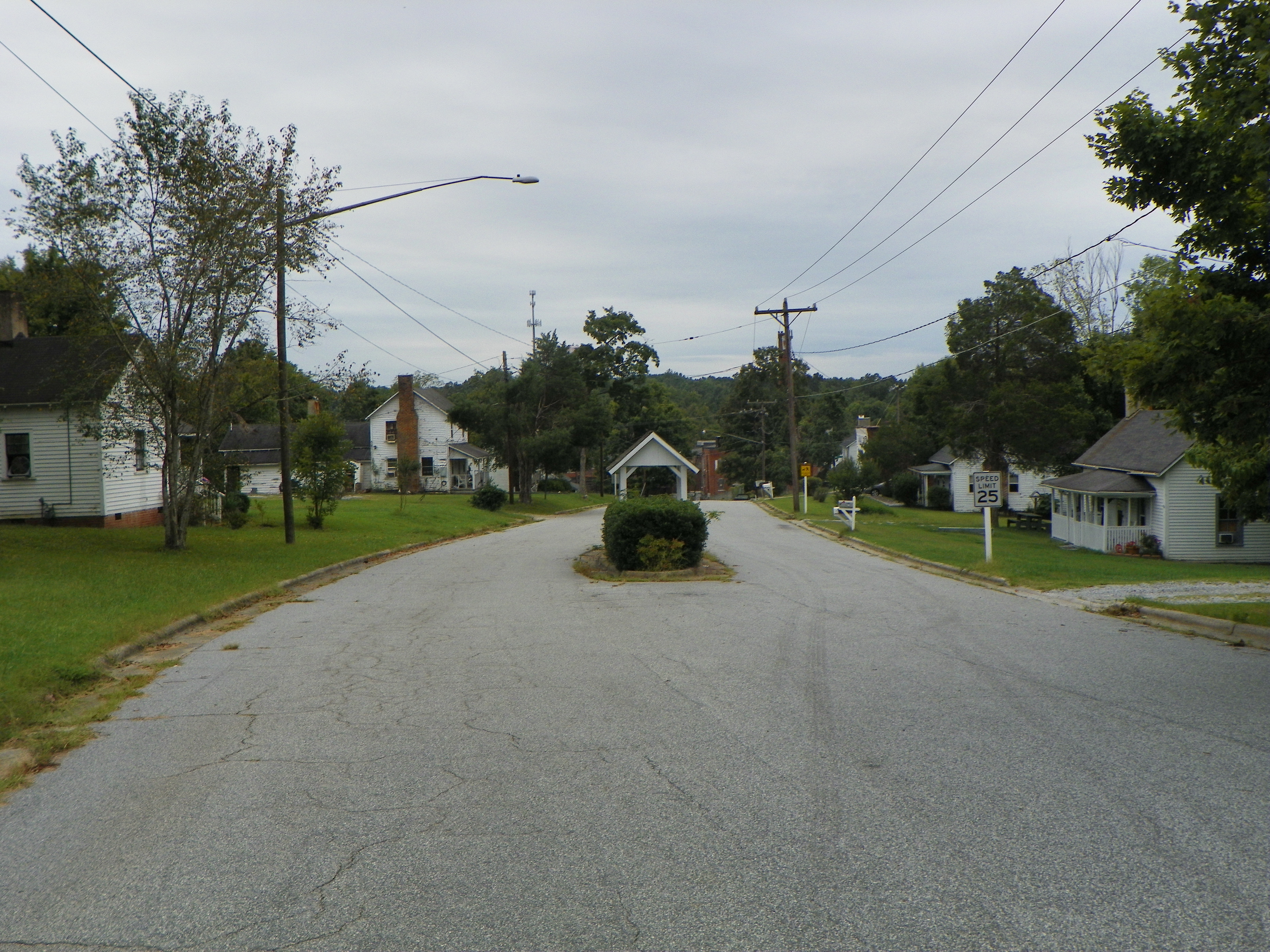
- Entrance to Oakdale Mill Village, September 2014

- Location within North Carolina Location within the United States
- Location: SR 1352 and SR 1144, Jamestown, North Carolina
- Coordinates: 35°58′50″N 79°55′48″W
- Area: 50 acres (20 ha)
- Built: 1889
- Architectural style: Italianate
- NRHP reference No.: 76001327
- Added to NRHP: March 15, 1976

Oakdale Cotton Mill Village is a historic textile mill, mill village, and national historic district located at Jamestown, Guilford County, North Carolina, United States. The district encompasses 37 contributing buildings including the Logan Manufacturing Company complex built during the 1880s and 33 frame mill worker houses dated to the early-20th century. The factory complex consists of a three-story rectangular brick office, a one and two-story L-shaped brick factory with a four-story tower and five one-story brick warehouses, a small one-story board-and-batten blacksmith shop, and a polygonal brick smokestack.

It was listed on the National Register of Historic Places in 1976.
