= Richard Mendenhall Plantation Buildings =

Historic house in North Carolina, United States

- Richard Mendenhall Homeplace and Buildings
- U.S. National Register of Historic Places
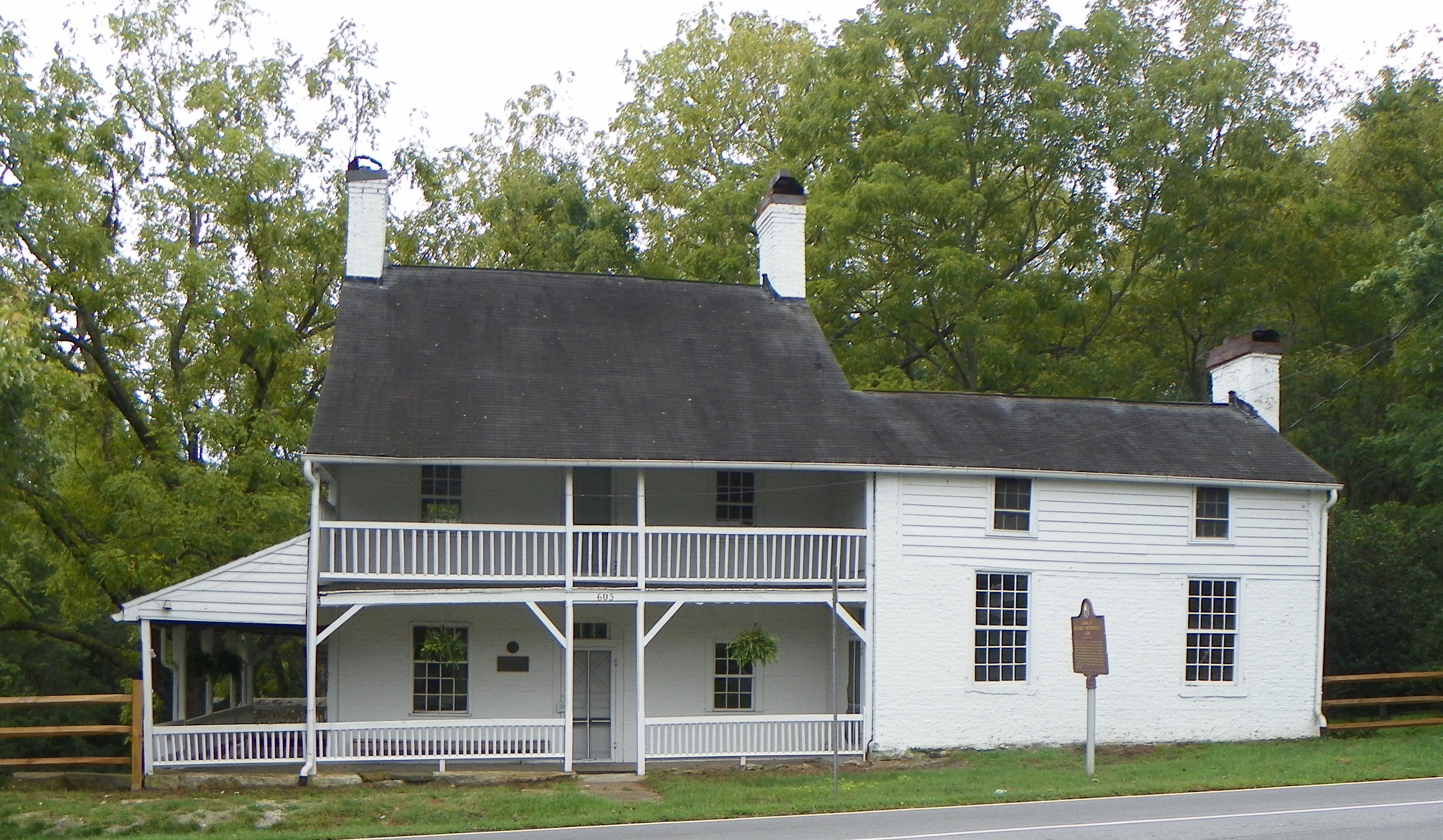
- Mendenhall Homeplace, September 2014

- Location within North Carolina Location within the United States
- Location: U.S. 29, Jamestown, North Carolina
- Coordinates: 35°59′34″N 79°56′56″W
- Area: 9 acres (3.6 ha)
- Built: 1811
- NRHP reference No.: 72000964
- Added to NRHP: November 3, 1972

Richard Mendenhall Homeplace and Buildings a historic homeplace, farm and buildings in the Southeastern United States located at Jamestown, Guilford County, North Carolina. The Mendenhall farmhouse was built in 1811, and consists of a two-story, brick main block of plain typically Quaker design, with a porch on three sides and a number of additions to the west and rear. Also on the property is a large early Red Bank Barn of the Pennsylvania German type, Underground Railroad False Bottom Wagon, One Room School House, Dr. Madison Lindsay's House, Museum, Thy Store, and a Well House.

The site is now opened for tours as Mendenhall Homeplace.

It was listed on the National Register of Historic Places in 1972. It is located in the Jamestown Historic District.
