= David Newton (artist) =

American sculptor and painter

- Born: December 1953; Oakland, California
- Died: April 2011 (aged 57); California
- Known for: Sculpture, Painting, Printmaking

David Christopher Newton (December 1953 – April 2011) was an American sculptor, painter, printmaker, draftsman, and college art teacher. Newton was born in 1953 in Oakland, California. He lived and worked in California, New York, Massachusetts, Rhode Island, and North Carolina with his wife Suzanne McBride Newton. He died in 2011 from colon and liver cancer.

== Art career and education ==
Newton began studying painting and drawing in the 1970s with Scott Halem (who was a former student of artist Frank Herbert Mason) in San Francisco. Newton moved to New York City in 1978 to study painting and drawing in the studio of Frank Herbert Mason at the Art Students League of New York. Newton met his future wife, Suzanne McBride Newton, when she modeled for a painting in the Mason class at The League. In addition to The Art Students League of New York, Newton also studied art at Pratt Graphics Center, Rhode Island School of Design, and Bard College (Masters of Fine Arts/MFA). Newton had a lifelong desire to learn new techniques and skills to add to his artwork, be it drawing, painting, printmaking, sculpting or blacksmithing and welding. To support himself, he worked as a bartender at the Algonquin Hotel, an exhibition and design preparator at the Rhode Island School of Design Museum, and an art teacher in a high school and several colleges, including Guilford College (where he was a tenured professor of art.) All along he diligently worked at making, exhibiting, and selling his paintings, drawings, prints, and sculptures.

== Art media and style transitions ==
Newton began his art career as a skilled traditional realist painter/printmaker/draftsman and over time gradually transitioned to abstraction in his sculpture and painting. Newton's preferred sculptural media were wood, metal and found objects which he used to create objects with whimsical and spiritual themes. Newton modeled wood with chisels and saws, blackened it with torches, and stained it with oils and pigments; welded and smithed metal; and in his last series of sculptures, he constructed objects based on architectural motifs. Many of his sculptural works resemble utilitarian objects, albeit functional, they are not actually utilitarian. Newton also drew and painted both figurative and landscape imagery based on observation and imagination. During the final year of his life David Newton worked on photography and drawing when he was no longer able to work on his physically demanding sculptures.

== Creative legacy ==
Newton's work has been exhibited around the world, including at The Museum of the City of New York; The Huan Tie Art Museum in Beijing, China; The Rhode Island School of Design Museum and The Brown University David Winton Bell Gallery in Providence, RI.; and The Weatherspoon Art Museum in Greensboro, NC. Newton's work is in numerous public and private collections in the US and Europe, including The Museum of the City of New York, Guilford College Art Gallery, and The Weatherspoon Art Museum. A memorial retrospective of his work, "Onward: The Creative Legacy of David Newton", opened in March 2012, at the Guilford College Art Gallery in Greensboro, North Carolina, where he was a professor of sculpture and drawing who taught and mentored many young artists.
