= Ragsdale Farm =

Historic farm in North Carolina, United States

- U.S. National Register of Historic Places
- U.S. Historic district
- Location within North Carolina Location within the United States
- Location: 404 E. Main St. Jamestown, North Carolina
- Coordinates: 35°59′48″N 79°55′51″W
- Area: 39 acres (16 ha)
- Built: 1866
- Architectural style: Colonial Revival, Traditional agricultural
- NRHP reference No.: 91001171
- Added to NRHP: September 3, 1991

Ragsdale Farm, also known as Magnolia Farms, is a historic farm and national historic district located in Jamestown, Guilford County, North Carolina. The district encompasses 13 contributing buildings, 2 contributing sites, and 4 contributing structures on a mid-20th century "gentleman's farm." They include the Ragsdale House (1880, 1900, 1948), a large two-story, Colonial Revival-style frame dwelling; granary, garage / wood shed; dog house; two chicken coops; fowl house; corn crib; privy; pump house; well house; cow barn; tenant house; and the domestic and agricultural landscapes. A horse riding school named Magnolia Farms Equestrian operates on a portion of the property.

It was listed on the National Register of Historic Places in 1991.
