= Gardner House (Jamestown, North Carolina) =

Historic house in North Carolina, United States

- U.S. National Register of Historic Places
- Location within North Carolina Location within the United States
- Location: East of Jamestown on SR 1383, near Jamestown, North Carolina
- Coordinates: 35°59′19″N 79°53′28″W
- Area: 60 acres (24 ha)
- Built: 1827
- Architectural style: Federal
- NRHP reference No.: 74001350
- Added to NRHP: October 15, 1974

Gardner House is a historic home located near Jamestown, Guilford County, North Carolina. It was built in 1827, and is a two-story, four bay by two bay brick dwelling. It has a one-story, four bay rear wing and features an unusual arch-linked double chimney. The interior has a modified Quaker plan. Also on the property is the site of the Gardner gold mine.

It was listed on the National Register of Historic Places in 1974.
