= McCulloch's Gold Mill =

- U.S. National Register of Historic Places
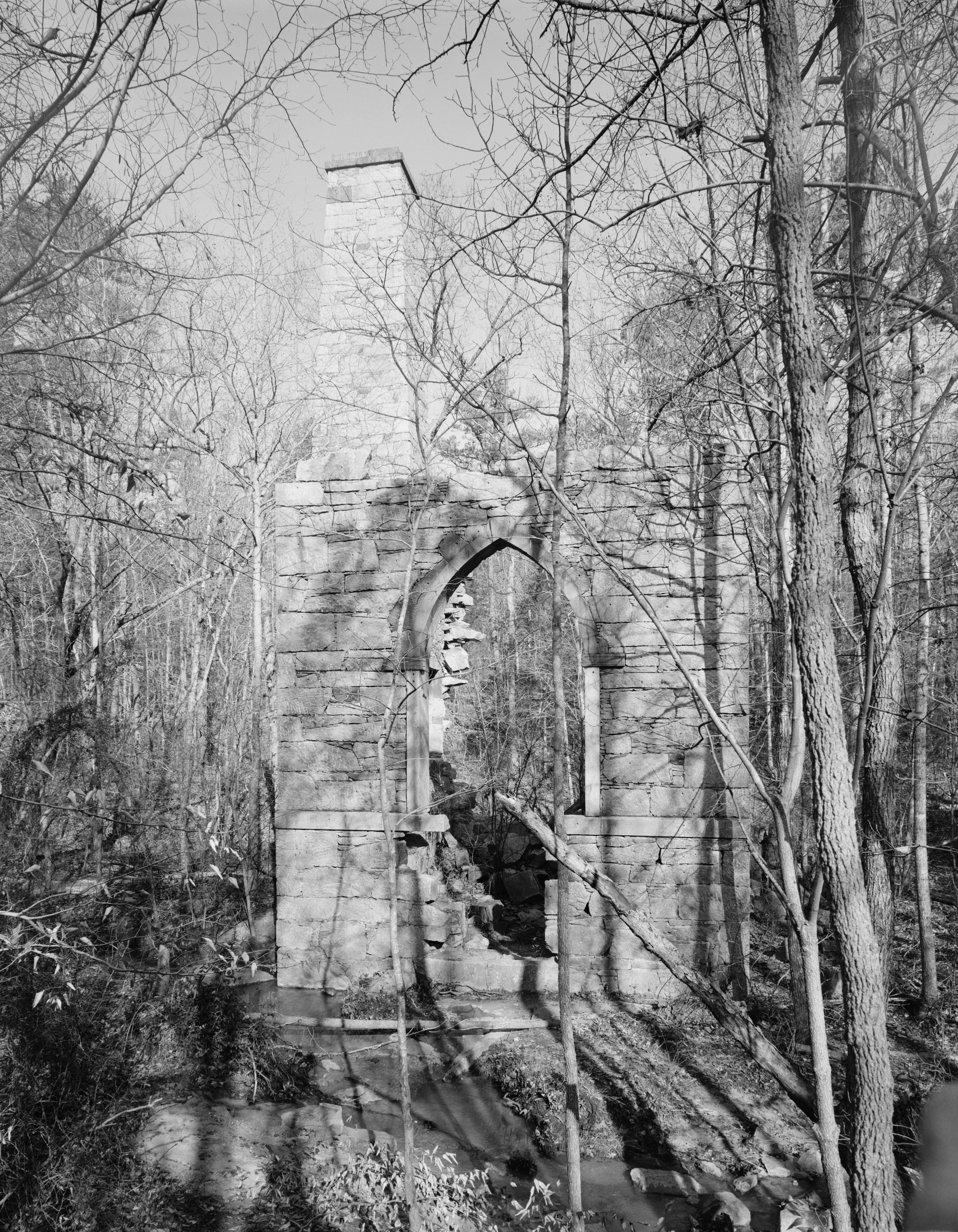
- McCulloch Gold Mill, HAER Photo, December 1977
- Nearest city: Jamestown, North Carolina
- Area: 17 acres (6.9 ha)
- Built: 1832
- Architectural style: Gothic
- NRHP reference No.: 79001717
- Added to NRHP: April 24, 1979

McCulloch's Gold Mill, also known as Rock Engine House, North State Mine, is a historic gold mill located near Jamestown, Guilford County, North Carolina. It consists of the ruins of the McCulloch Gold Mill, built of dry laid random ashlar granite construction in 1832. The ruins consist of two walls: one 29 feet, 6 inches long; and the second 24 feet, 8 inches wide. The second wall incorporates a chimney and Gothic arched opening.

It was listed on the National Register of Historic Places in 1979.
