= Jimmy Armstrong (American football) =

American football player (born 1962)

No. 10, 35
- Position: Cornerback

Personal information
- Born: June 18, 1962 (age 64); Guilford County, North Carolina, U.S.
- Listed height: 5 ft 8 in (1.73 m)
- Listed weight: 166 lb (75 kg)

Career information
- High school: Ragsdale (NC)
- College: Appalachian State
- NFL draft: 1987: undrafted

Career history
- Dallas Cowboys (1987)

Career NFL statistics
- Games started: 2
- Stats at Pro Football Reference

James Burton Armstrong (born June 18, 1962) is an American former professional football player who was a cornerback in the National Football League (NFL) for the Dallas Cowboys. He played college football for the Appalachian State Mountaineers.

== Early life ==
Armstrong attended Lucy Ragsdale High School. He accepted a football scholarship from Appalachian State University, where he started at cornerback.

== Professional career ==
Armstrong was signed as an undrafted free agent by the Dallas Cowboys after the 1987 NFL draft. He played in only one preseason game and was waived on August 17.

After the NFLPA strike was declared on the third week of the 1987 season, those contests were canceled (reducing the 16-game season to 15) and the NFL decided that the games would be played with replacement players. On September 22, 1987, he was re-signed to be a part of the Dallas replacement team that was given the mock name "Rhinestone Cowboys" by the media. He started 2 games at left cornerback. He was declared inactive because of an injury in the fifth game against the Washington Redskins. On October 27, he was placed on the injured reserve list. He was released on December 1, 1987.
