= Ragsdale High School =

American public school in North Carolina

Lucy Ragsdale High School
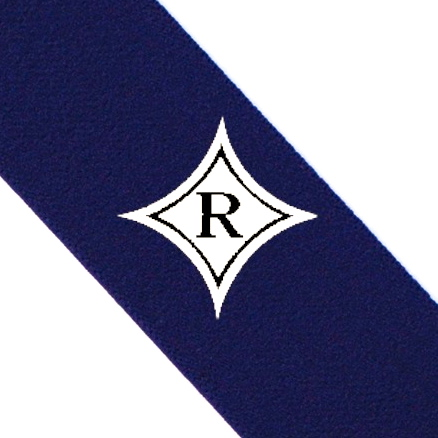

Location
- 1000 Lucy Ragsdale School Road; Jamestown, North Carolina 27282; United States; 35°59′44″N 79°54′59″W

Information
- School type: Public
- Opened: 1959 (67 years ago)
- School district: Guilford County Schools
- CEEB code: 341955
- Principal: Noel Keener
- Staff: 80.87 (FTE)
- Grades: 9–12
- Enrollment: 1,292 (2024-2025)
- Student to teacher ratio: 15.98
- Schedule: 9:15–4:15
- Colors: Royal blue and white
- Athletics: NCHSAA 6A
- Athletics conference: Metro 6A/7A
- Mascot: Tigers
- Accreditation: Southern Association of Colleges and Schools
- Website: ragsdalehs.gcsnc.com

Lucy Ragsdale High School (commonly known as Ragsdale High School) is a public high school in Jamestown, North Carolina. Opened in 1959, Ragsdale is one of 26 high schools in Guilford County Schools. The areas that are zoned to Ragsdale's district include areas of northeastern High Point, southeast Jamestown, and the Adams Farm/Sedgefield area of Greensboro. The school's current principal is Noel Keener.

== History ==
Ragsdale High School opened in 1959. The school was named after Lucy Coffin Ragsdale (1879–1964), who was an advocate for public school education in Jamestown. In 1962, Ragsdale was accredited by the Southern Association of Colleges and Schools.

== Campus ==
The High School is an excellent example of postwar functionalist architecture and bears a striking similarity to several other local schools commissioned and built around the same period. Extensive updates were planned for the building. Construction was set to begin in late 2010, but due to insufficient funds from the School Board System, construction was delayed another year. The construction was completed in 2012.

Kennith T. Miller Memorial Stadium in 2013

== Athletics ==
The Ragsdale Tigers compete in the Metro 6A/7A Conference. Ragsdale fields teams in baseball, basketball, cheerleading, cross country, football, golf, lacrosse, soccer, softball, swimming, tennis, track (indoor and outdoor), volleyball, and wrestling.

Past principal, Dr. Kathryn Rogers, received the Bob Deaton Principal of the Year Award from the NCHSAA's (North Carolina High School Athletic Association) annual meeting in Chapel Hill in May 2010.

== Curriculum ==
The school course work ranges from College Placement, Honors, and to Advanced Placement of study. Considering Ragsdale High School is on a "block schedule", most classes are one semester in length. All CP and Honors courses are restricted to one semester, but few AP courses stretch through the entire year. Advanced Placement courses consist of: Calculus AB, Calculus BC, Statistics, U.S. Government and Politics, Psychology, European History, World History, U.S. History, Latin, French, Spanish, English Language, English Literature, Biology, Chemistry, Environmental Science, Art History, Art, and Music Theory.

On August 28, 2019, Ragsdale was awarded the Hubert B. Humphrey Award, which recognizes exemplary improvement in academic improvement in areas such as final exam scores, Career and Technical Education participation, and graduation rates.

== Notable alumni ==
- Jimmy Armstrong — former NFL cornerback
- Devan Boykin — college football defensive back for the Indiana Hoosiers
- Cecil Brockman — politician
- Winston Craig — former NFL defensive tackle
- Mark Dixon — former NFL offensive guard
- Pat McCrory — 53rd mayor of Charlotte and 74th Governor of North Carolina (2013–2017)
- Siri Mullinix — goalie for 2000 U.S. Women's Olympic Soccer Team
- Paul Martin Newby — Chief Justice of the North Carolina Supreme Court (2021–present)
- Larry Ogunjobi — current NFL defensive tackle
- Kasey Redfern — former NFL punter
- Cody Rigsby — Peloton instructor
- Carson Ware — NASCAR Xfinity Series driver
- Cody Ware — NASCAR Cup Series and IMSA WeatherTech Sports Car Series driver
