= T. Gilbert Pearson =

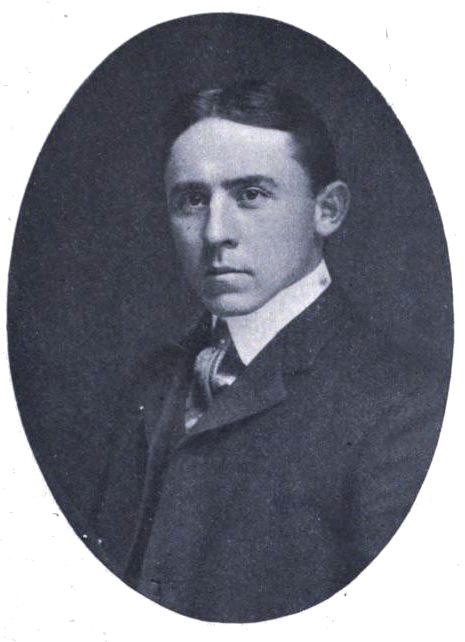
- Portrait c. 1903
- Born: Thomas Gilbert Pearson; November 10, 1873; Tuscola, Illinois, US
- Died: September 3, 1943 (aged 69); New York City, New York, US

Thomas Gilbert Pearson (1873–1943) was an American conservationist and one of the first faculty members at the University of North Carolina at Greensboro. He co-founded the National Association of Audubon Societies, later known as the National Audubon Society. He was also a founder of the International Committee for Bird Protection.

== Life ==
Pearson grew up in the woods of central Florida after moving there at the age of 9 from Dublin, Indiana. He lived in a log cabin with his parents and six siblings- 3 brothers and 3 sisters. The Pearsons were members of the Society of Friends. Encouraged by an older friend, Pearson began egg collecting. This hobby caused him to play truant from school, which was one of the reasons for his bad school record.

At 13, he bought a gun, which he had long desired to own. He learned that he could earn 90 cents to $1.25 by killing egrets and selling their plumes. He also made money by selling many birds' eggs.

After learning how to mount birds, he gathered quite a collection. He wrote to many schools and colleges, hoping to secure admission and pay for his education with his collection. At the age of 18, in 1891, President Lyndon Hobbs of Guilford College accepted Pearson's offer. In return, Pearson received board and tuition for two years if he would also collect and mount birds for the college. After two years of college, Pearson received a scholarship to continue his studies at Guilford. During his time at Guilford, he served as editor of the college magazine, president of his literary society, manager of the baseball team, and was also captain of the football team.

After graduating from college, Pearson decided to devote his time and energy to arousing the people of North Carolina to the idea of protecting their rapidly declining bird population. He then became a biology teacher at Guilford College where he also met Elsie Weatherly. The two married in 1902.

In 1901, Pearson accepted the chair of biology and geology at the State Normal and Industrial College in Greensboro (now the University of North Carolina at Greensboro). He took his students on outdoor walks, considering this as important as laboratory work with a microscope. During this period, he published his first book, Stories of Bird Life. The founder and first president of the National Association of Audubon Societies, William Dutcher, saw this book and encouraged Pearson to organize an Audubon Society in North Carolina. This he did in 1902, launching himself upon a course that would lead to influential work in state and national legislation.

Pearson used the platform of the society created in North Carolina to encourage the legislature to pass a law that would be the states' first step towards wildlife conservation. That law passed in 1903 and was known as the "Audubon Law." It gave the Audubon Society the power to enforce wildlife laws in North Carolina and authorized the Society to hire game wardens to carry out the enforcement. These efforts were funded by donations from individuals as well as the sale of non-resident hunting licenses for $10 each. The non-resident licenses were wildly unpopular even though most non-resident hunters at the time had the means to pay the fee associated with the license. It was their belief that the license went against the tradition of Southern hospitality.

Pearson challenged the fashion industry to end plume hunting. These plumes were commonly used in contemporary fashion. The millinery industry was particularly resistant to this change, as hats featuring fine feathers were very popular. Milliners feared that demand for their products would plummet without feathers. Pearson, a skilled orator, educated a fashionable audience about the origins of the plumes in their hats. He detailed for them how each species of bird represented had been slaughtered on its breeding grounds.

Upon returning from a trip to Mexico in 1911, Pearson faced accusations that the Audubon Society profited from license fees and fines and was misusing taxpayer's money on wildlife protection. Both of those claims were untrue. The effects of those claims, however, were detrimental to the Audubon Law passed in 1903, as counties were now allowed to exempt themselves from the law. At year's end, only 46 of the State's 100 counties remained under the law. From that point, conservationists pushed for a State Game Commission that would not come about until 1927 when a State Division of Game and Inland Fisheries was created as part of the N.C. Department of Conservation and Development. It would not be until 1947 with the help of the N.C. Wildlife Federation and other agencies that North Carolina would see an independent wildlife agency run by a professionally trained staff—the N.C. Wildlife Commission.

In 1924, he was awarded an honorary Doctor of Laws degree from the University of North Carolina. He received the medal of The John Burroughs Association, the National Order of the Oaken Crown from Luxembourg, and the medal of the Societe National d'Acclimatation from France.

Pearson became secretary of the National Association of Audubon Societies and, following William Dutcher's death in 1920, served as president for 14 years.

== Selected publications ==
- Adventures in Bird Protection (1937)
- The Birds of America (1944)
