= Jamestown News =

- November 26, 2008 front page
- Type: Weekly newspaper
- Format: Broadsheet
- Owner: Charles Womack
- Publisher: Womack Newspapers, Inc.
- Language: English
- Headquarters: 5500 Adams Farm Lane, Suite 204, Greensboro, North Carolina United States
- Sister newspapers: YES! Weekly
- ISSN: 1074-5122
- OCLC number: 29743088
- Website: jamestownnews.com

Jamestown News is a weekly newspaper based in Jamestown, North Carolina covering Guilford County. It is located at 5500 Adams Farm Lane, Suite 204, Greensboro, NC 27407, in the YES! Weekly offices.
