= Kasey Redfern =

American football player (1991–2026)

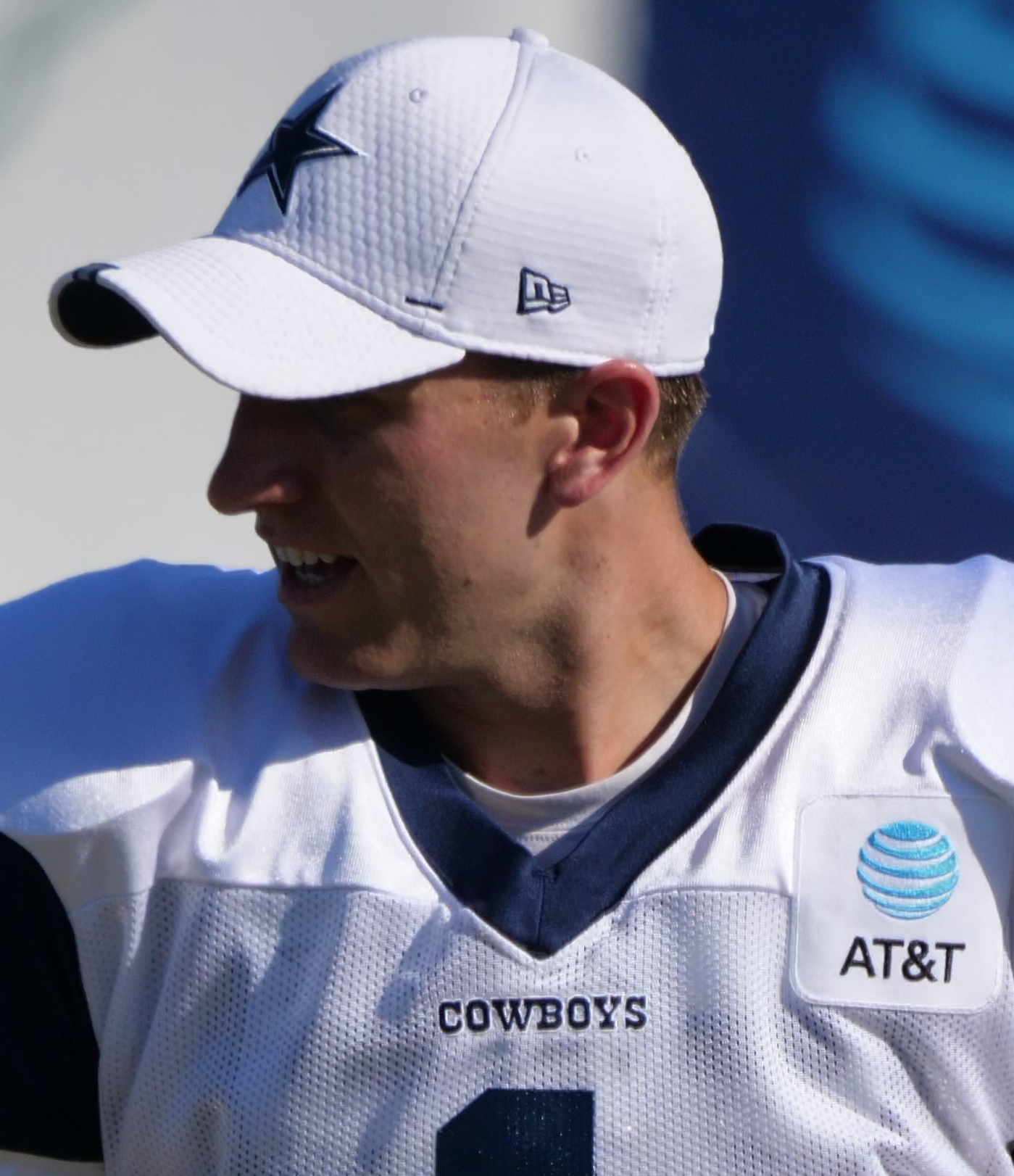
- Redfern with the Dallas Cowboys in 2019

No. 2, 9
- Position: Punter

Personal information
- Born: September 26, 1991; Jamestown, North Carolina, U.S.
- Died: October 13, 2026 (aged 35); Spartanburg, South Carolina, U.S.
- Listed height: 6 ft 2 in (1.88 m)
- Listed weight: 205 lb (93 kg)

Career information
- High school: Ragsdale (Jamestown)
- College: Wofford (2010–2013)
- NFL draft: 2014: undrafted

Career history
- Jacksonville Jaguars (2014–2015)*; San Diego Chargers (2015–2016)*; Carolina Panthers (2016)*; Cleveland Browns (2016)*; Detroit Lions (2017); Dallas Cowboys (2019)*; Atlanta Falcons (2019)
- * Offseason or practice squad member only

Career NFL statistics
- Punts: 10
- Punting yards: 421
- Punting average: 42.1
- Rushing attempts: 1
- Rushing yards: 10
- Stats at Pro Football Reference

Kasey Redfern (September 26, 1991 – October 13, 2026) was an American professional football player who was a punter in the National Football League (NFL). He played college football for the Wofford Terriers. He signed with the Jacksonville Jaguars as an undrafted free agent in 2014.

== College career ==
Redfern attended Wofford College and played college football for the Terriers.

== Professional career ==
Pre-draft measurables
Height	Weight	Arm length	Hand span	Wingspan	40-yard dash	10-yard split	20-yard split	Vertical jump
6 ft 1 5/8 in (1.87 m)	208 lb (94 kg)	30 5/8 in (0.78 m)	8 1/2 in (0.22 m)	6 ft 3 3/4 in (1.92 m)	4.83 s	1.69 s	2.71 s	36.0 in (0.91 m)
All values from Pro Day

=== Jacksonville Jaguars ===
After going unselected in the 2014 NFL draft, Redfern signed with Jacksonville Jaguars on June 19, 2014. He was waived on August 30, 2014.

Redfern re-signed with the Jaguars on January 27, 2015, on a futures deal. The Jaguars waived him on August 29, 2015.

=== San Diego Chargers ===
On December 22, 2015, the San Diego Chargers signed Redfern to their practice squad.

Redfern signed a futures deal on January 21, 2016.

=== Carolina Panthers ===
Redfern signed with the Carolina Panthers on August 15, 2016.

=== Cleveland Browns ===
The Panthers traded Redfern and 2018 fourth round pick (later traded to the Miami Dolphins) to the Cleveland Browns for punter Andy Lee and a 2017 seventh round pick on August 29, 2016. On September 3, 2016, he was released by the Browns.

=== Detroit Lions ===
On April 25, 2017, Redfern signed with the Detroit Lions.

On September 1, 2017, Redfern was announced as the Lions' starting punter due to an injury to incumbent punter Sam Martin that would sideline him for at least the first six weeks of the season.

On September 10, in the regular season opener, Redfern suffered a torn ACL, MCL, and a partially torn patellar tendon after he was hit by Arizona Cardinals tight end Ifeanyi Momah near the sideline after Redfern took a bobbled snap in his own end zone and tried to run for a first down. He was placed on the injured reserve on September 12, 2017.

=== Dallas Cowboys ===
On April 5, 2019, Redfern signed with the Dallas Cowboys. He was released on August 31, 2019.

=== Atlanta Falcons ===
On October 11, 2019, Redfern was signed to the Atlanta Falcons practice squad, and promoted to the active roster the next day. He was Atlanta's third punter of the season, after injuries to Matt Bosher and Matt Wile. He was waived on October 29.

== Personal life and death ==
Redfern died on October 13, 2026, at the age of 35. He had been undergoing chemotherapy treatments for a cancerous brain tumor and CNS lymphoma since 2023.
