= High Point City Lake =

Park in Guilford County, North Carolina, US

- Interactive map of High Point City Lake
- Location: Guilford County, North Carolina, United States
- Coordinates: 36°00′00″N 79°56′46″W
- Type: Reservoir
- Primary inflows: Deep River
- Primary outflows: Deep River
- Basin countries: United States
- Surface area: 150–341 acres (61–138 ha) (estimates vary)
- Max. depth: 20 feet (6.1 m)
- Settlements: High Point, Jamestown

High Point City Lake (also called City Lake) is a reservoir on the Deep River in Guilford County, North Carolina, near Jamestown. It is owned by the city of High Point and was originally built as a municipal water supply.

== History ==
The lake was formed by damming the Deep River at Jamestown in the late 1920s; construction of the dam was underway by 1927 and complete by 1928. The reservoir was intended to supply the growing city's water needs amid the population and industrial growth High Point experienced during the 1920s furniture and hosiery boom.

The surrounding City Lake Park was developed during the Great Depression. The federal Civil Works Administration provided approximately $125,000 toward the park's construction, with additional funding later provided by the Works Progress Administration; more than 900 workers were employed on the project. The park was designed by landscape architect R. D. Tillson, with buildings designed by the local architectural firm of Voorhees and Everhart. City Lake Park opened to the public in 1935.

== Geography ==
Sources vary on the lake's exact area, with figures ranging from approximately 150 acres to 341 acres, and a maximum depth of about 20 feet (6 m).

== Recreation ==
City Lake Park offers fishing, boating, and rentals of fishing boats, canoes, and kayaks, along with a swimming pool complex, playground, and miniature golf course. Fish species present include largemouth bass, smallmouth bass, crappie, bluegill, and chain pickerel, among others.
