= Jamestown Historic District (Jamestown, North Carolina) =

Historic district in North Carolina, United States

- U.S. National Register of Historic Places
- U.S. Historic district
- Location within North Carolina Location within the United States
- Location: Both sides of U.S. 29A, Jamestown, North Carolina
- Coordinates: 35°59′40″N 79°56′44″W
- Area: 70 acres (28 ha)
- NRHP reference No.: 73001345
- Added to NRHP: January 22, 1973

Jamestown Historic District is a national historic district located at Jamestown, Guilford County, North Carolina. The district encompasses nine contributing buildings in the Quaker community of Jamestown dated to the early-19th century. Located in the district is the separately listed Richard Mendenhall Plantation Buildings. Other notable buildings include the Richard Mendenhall Store, Jamestown Friends' Meeting House, Dr Shubal Coffin's House and Medical School (c. 1812), Dr. Coffin's second house (c. 1855), Harper-Johnson House, Mcinnis House, Joyner House, and Potter Log House.

It was listed on the National Register of Historic Places in 1973.
