= Larry Ogunjobi =

American football player (born 1994)

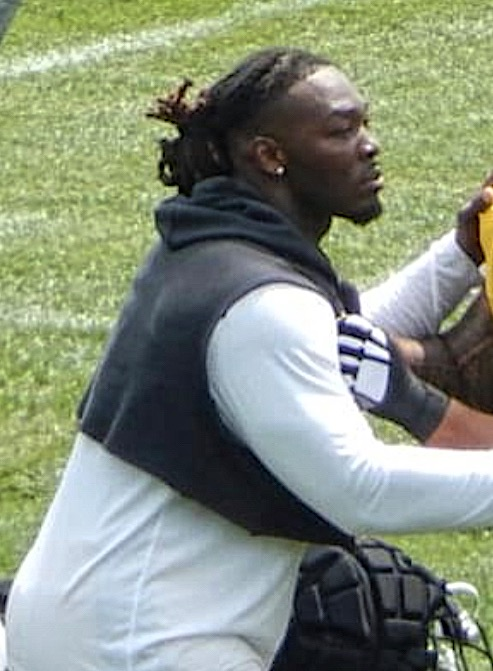
- Ogunjobi with the Pittsburgh Steelers in 2023

Profile
- Position: Defensive tackle

Personal information
- Born: June 3, 1994 (age 32); Livingston, New Jersey, U.S.
- Listed height: 6 ft 2 in (1.88 m)
- Listed weight: 305 lb (138 kg)

Career information
- High school: Ragsdale (Jamestown, North Carolina)
- College: Charlotte (2013–2016)
- NFL draft: 2017: 3rd round, 65th overall pick

Career history
- Cleveland Browns (2017–2020); Cincinnati Bengals (2021); Pittsburgh Steelers (2022–2024); Buffalo Bills (2025)

Career NFL statistics as of 2025
- Total tackles: 380
- Sacks: 27.5
- Forced fumbles: 3
- Fumble recoveries: 2
- Pass deflections: 3
- Stats at Pro Football Reference

Olumide Larry Ogunjobi (born June 3, 1994) is an American professional football defensive tackle. He played college football for the Charlotte 49ers, and was selected by the Cleveland Browns in the third round of the 2017 NFL draft. He has previously played for the Cincinnati Bengals, the Pittsburgh Steelers, and the Buffalo Bills.

== Early life and college ==
Ogunjobi was born in Livingston, New Jersey, to Yoruba parents who had immigrated from Nigeria. He attended Ragsdale High School in Jamestown, North Carolina. From 2013 to 2016 he played college football at Charlotte, recording 217 tackles and 13 sacks. At Charlotte, he double-majored in computer science and biology, graduating with a degree in computer science in December 2016.

== Professional career ==
=== Pre-draft ===
Coming out of college, Ogunjobi was ranked as the 15th best defensive tackle in the draft by CBSSports.com and was projected to be a fifth or sixth-round pick. He received an invitation to the 2017 Senior Bowl, practiced well throughout the week, and played defensive tackle for the North who lost 16–15 to the South. Ogunjobi raised his draft stock after showcasing his talent in the Senior Bowl. He participated at the NFL Combine and completed all the required combine and positional drills. About a dozen or more scouts and representatives attended Charlotte's Pro Day to scout Ogunjobi as the feature prospect and two other teammates. NFL draft experts and analysts projected him to be a second or third-round pick. He was ranked as the third-best defensive tackle in the draft by ESPN, was ranked the fourth-best defensive tackle by NFLDraftScout.com, was ranked the fifth-best defensive tackle by NFL analyst Mike Mayock, and was ranked the sixth-best defensive tackle by Sports Illustrated.

Pre-draft measurables
Height	Weight	Arm length	Hand span	40-yard dash	10-yard split	20-yard split	20-yard shuttle	Three-cone drill	Vertical jump	Broad jump	Bench press
6 ft 2 5/8 in (1.90 m)	305 lb (138 kg)	32 5/8 in (0.83 m)	10 in (0.25 m)	4.97 s	1.76 s	2.90 s	4.75 s	7.55 s	32.0 in (0.81 m)	9 ft 8 in (2.95 m)	26 reps
All values from NFL Combine

=== Cleveland Browns ===
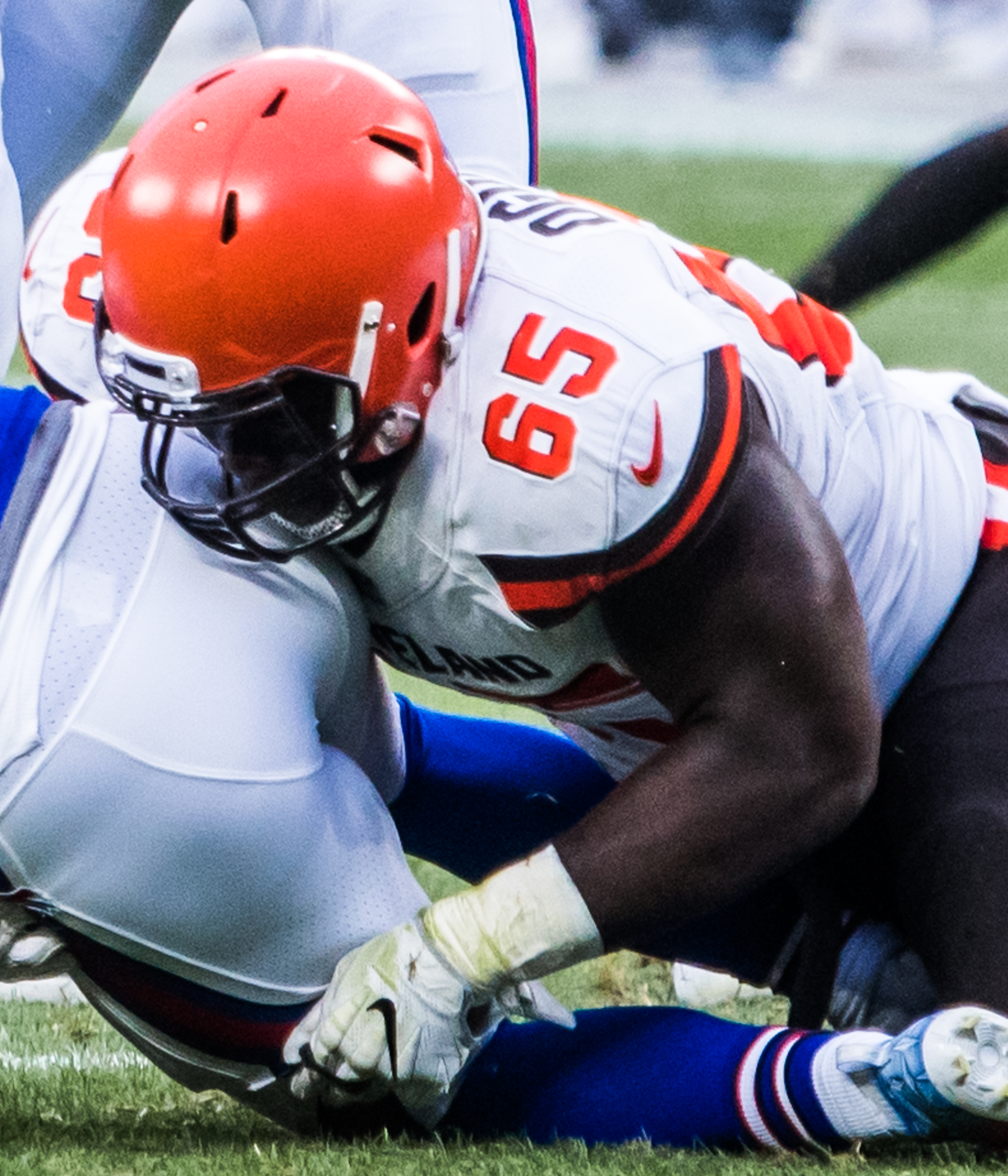
Ogunjobi makes a tackle during a pre-season game against the Buffalo Bills on August 17, 2018

The Cleveland Browns selected Ogunjobi in the third round (65th overall) of the 2017 NFL draft. Ogunjobi signed his contract with the Browns on May 17, 2017, a deal which totaled $3.9 million. He went on to play in 14 games, recording 17 solo tackles and a sack during his rookie season with the Browns as the team finished with an 0-16 record.

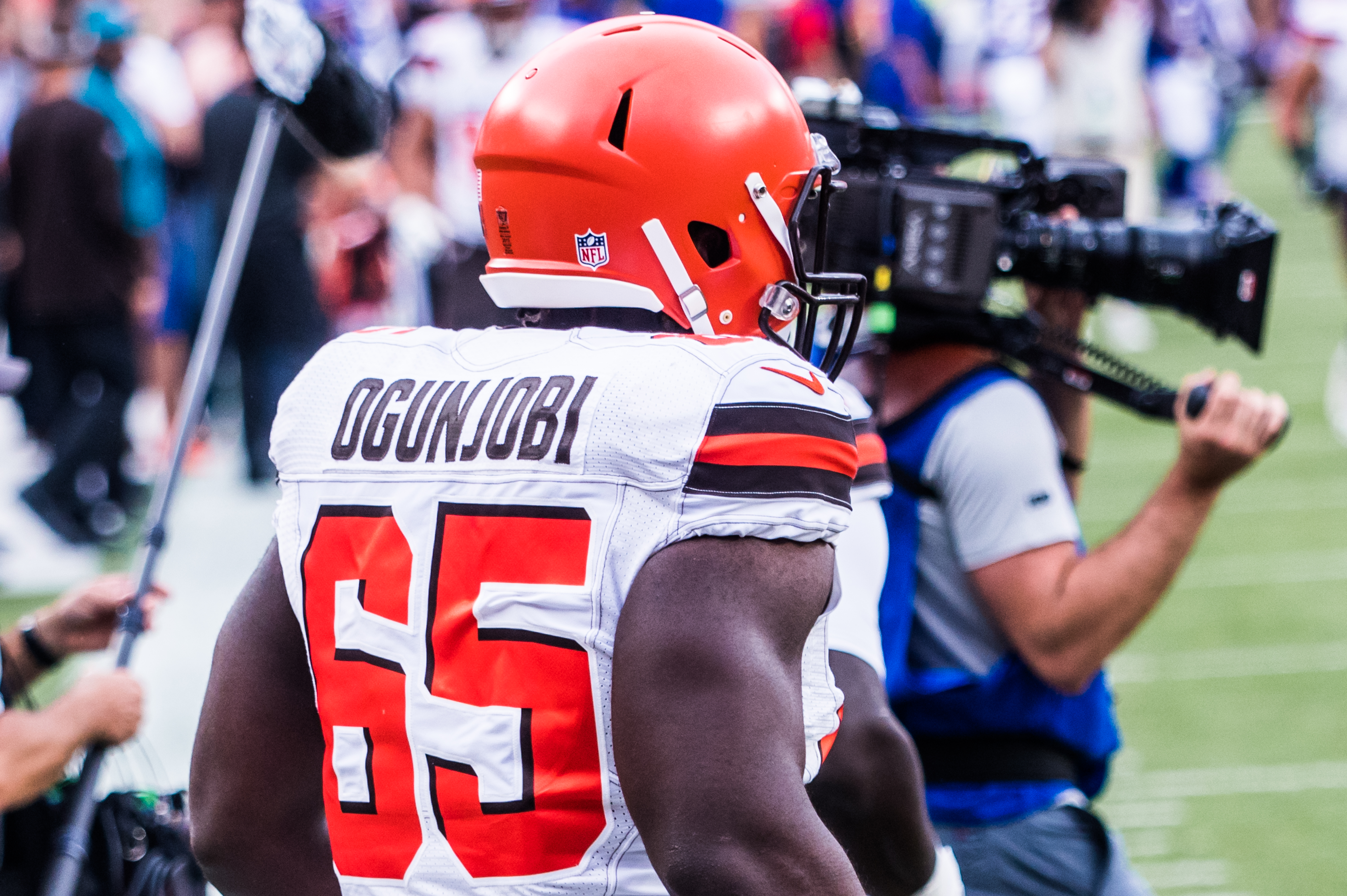
Ogunjobi with the Browns in 2018

In 2018, Ogunjobi finished the season making 33 solo tackles, 19 assisted tackles and 5.5 sacks.

On November 14, 2019, near the end of a game against Pittsburgh Steelers, teammate Myles Garrett and Steelers quarterback Mason Rudolph got tangled up and began fighting, ending with Garrett hitting Rudolph with a helmet. As other teammates began running towards the two, Ogunjobi hit Rudolph, who was still without his helmet, from behind knocking him onto the ground. He was later suspended for one game without pay and fined.

Ogunjobi made his playoff debut on January 10, 2021 when the Browns defeated the Steelers 48-37. He recorded three assisted tackles in his only playoff victory. He only recorded one solo tackle during the Browns' AFC divisional round playoff loss to the Kansas City Chiefs.

=== Cincinnati Bengals ===
On March 19, 2021, Ogunjobi signed a one-year, $6.2 million contract with the Cincinnati Bengals. He started 16 games in 2021, recording a career-high seven sacks, 49 tackles, and a team-high 12 tackles for loss. In the wild card playoff game with the Las Vegas Raiders he suffered a season ending foot injury that required surgery.

On March 14, 2022, Ogunjobi was reported and expected to sign with the Chicago Bears, but failed the conditional physical, resulting in the offer being rescinded.

=== Pittsburgh Steelers ===
On June 21, 2022, Ogunjobi signed a one-year deal with the Steelers. He started 16 games in 2022, recording 48 tackles and 1.5 sacks.

On March 17, 2023, Ogunjobi signed a three-year, $28.75 million contract extension with the Steelers. In 2023, Ogunjobi finished the season with 21 tackles, three being for a loss, and a forced fumble. He made two tackles in the Steelers' Wildcard playoff loss to the Buffalo Bills in January 2024.

In 2024, he recorded his first sack of the season on New York Jets quarterback Aaron Rodgers as the Steelers won 37-15.

Ogunjobi was released by the Steelers on March 10, 2025.

=== Buffalo Bills ===
On March 14, 2025, Larry Ogunjobi signed a one-year, $8.3 million contract with the Buffalo Bills. However, after signing with the Bills, Ogunjobi was suspended for six games for violating the NFL's PED policy.

== NFL career statistics ==
Legend
	Led the league
**Bold**	Career high

=== Regular season ===
Year	Team	Games		Tackles					Interceptions						Fumbles				
Year	Team	GP	GS	Cmb	Solo	Ast	Sck	TFL	Int	Yds	Avg	Lng	TD	PD	FF	Fum	FR	Yds	TD
2017	CLE	14	1	32	17	15	1.0	4	0	0	0.0	0	0	0	0	0	0	0	0
2018	CLE	16	16	**52**	33	19	5.5	10	0	0	0.0	0	0	0	**1**	0	0	0	0
2019	CLE	15	15	50	**35**	15	5.5	10	0	0	0.0	0	0	1	0	0	0	0	0
2020	CLE	15	15	46	23	23	2.5	5	0	0	0.0	0	0	0	**1**	0	0	0	0
2021	CIN	16	16	49	29	20	**7.0**	**12**	0	0	0.0	0	0	0	0	0	0	0	0
2022	PIT	16	16	48	25	23	1.5	7	0	0	0.0	0	0	0	0	0	0	0	0
2023	PIT	17	17	43	21	22	3.0	3	0	0	0.0	0	0	**2**	**1**	0	**2**	0	0
2024	PIT	15	12	41	16	**25**	1.5	5	0	0	0.0	0	0	0	0	0	0	0	0
2025	BUF	10	0	19	10	9	0.0	4	0	0	0.0	0	0	0	0	0	0	0	0
Career		134	108	380	209	171	27.5	60	0	0	0.0	0	0	3	3	0	2	0	0

=== Postseason ===
Year	Team	Games		Tackles					Interceptions						Fumbles				
Year	Team	GP	GS	Cmb	Solo	Ast	Sck	TFL	Int	Yds	Avg	Lng	TD	PD	FF	Fum	FR	Yds	TD
2020	CLE	2	2	4	1	**3**	0.0	0	0	0	0.0	0	0	0	0	0	0	0	0
2021	CIN	1	1	0	0	0	0.0	0	0	0	0.0	0	0	0	0	0	**1**	**11**	0
2023	PIT	1	1	**5**	**2**	**3**	0.0	**1**	0	0	0.0	0	0	0	0	0	0	0	0
2024	PIT	1	1	2	1	1	0.0	0	0	0	0.0	0	0	0	0	0	0	0	0
2025	BUF	1	0	0	0	0	0.0	0	0	0	0.0	0	0	0	0	0	0	0	0
Career		6	5	11	4	7	0.0	1	0	0	0.0	0	0	0	0	0	1	11	0
