= Jamestown, North Carolina =

- Town
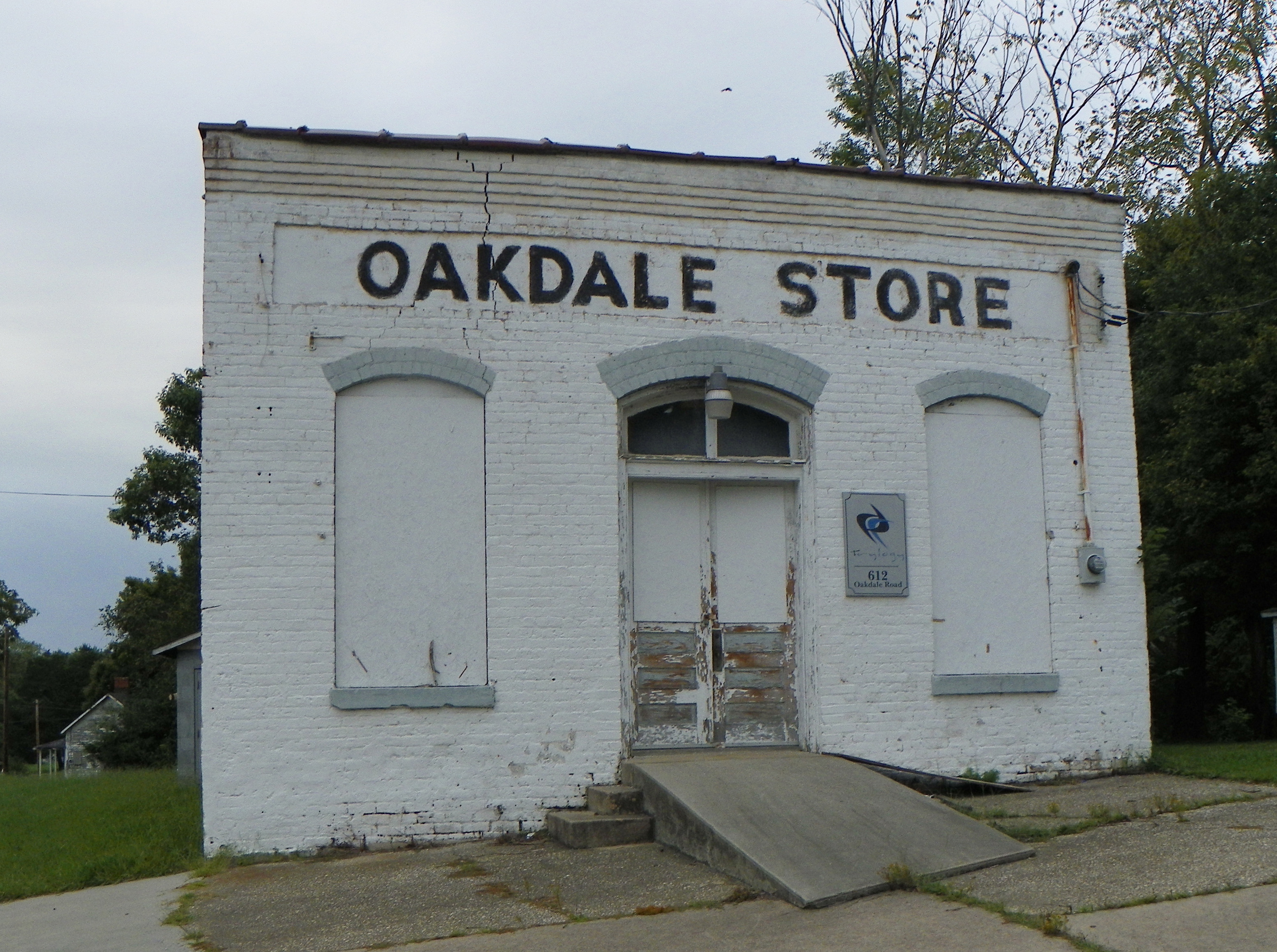
- Oakdale Cotton Mill Village

- Flag Seal
- Motto: "Walking with History"
- Location in Guilford County and the state of North Carolina
- Coordinates: 35°59′54″N 79°56′05″W
- Country: United States
- State: North Carolina
- County: Guilford
- Founded: 1752
- Incorporated: 1816, 1947
- Named for: James Mendenhall

Area
  - Total: 3.00 sq mi (7.76 km^{2})
  - Land: 3.00 sq mi (7.76 km^{2})
  - Water: 0 sq mi (0.00 km^{2})
- Elevation: 820 ft (250 m)

Population (2020)
  - Total: 3,668
  - Density: 1,223.9/sq mi (472.56/km^{2})
- Time zone: UTC-5 (Eastern (EST))
  - Summer (DST): UTC-4 (EDT)
- ZIP code: 27282
- Area code: 336
- FIPS code: 37-34300
- GNIS feature ID: 2405904
- Website: www.jamestown-nc.gov

Jamestown is a town in Guilford County, North Carolina, United States. It is a suburb of the nearby cities of Greensboro and High Point. As of the 2020 census, Jamestown had a population of 3,668.

== Geography ==
Jamestown is bordered to the west by the city of High Point. Downtown Greensboro is 11 miles (18 km) to the northeast.

=== Transportation ===
The Jamestown Parkway is a limited-access highway which goes south of the downtown core, connecting the town to I-74 to the west, and I-73 to the northeast. Greensboro Road and Main Street serve the downtown core. Wendover Avenue (US 70) traverses in the northern outskirts of the town, which is also of limited-access grade, connecting the town to High Point and Greensboro. US 29 goes in the southern outskirts of the town, connecting to I-85.

According to the United States Census Bureau, the town has a total area of 2.9 square miles (7.5 km^{2}), all land. The Deep River, a tributary of the Cape Fear River, flows through the southern part of the town.

== Demographics ==
=== 2020 census ===
As of the 2020 census, Jamestown had a population of 3,668. The median age was 50.1 years. 16.6% of residents were under the age of 18 and 25.0% of residents were 65 years of age or older. For every 100 females there were 85.3 males, and for every 100 females age 18 and over there were 85.1 males age 18 and over.

100.0% of residents lived in urban areas, while 0.0% lived in rural areas.

There were 1,627 households in Jamestown, of which 25.0% had children under the age of 18 living in them. Of all households, 52.0% were married-couple households, 14.6% were households with a male householder and no spouse or partner present, and 28.9% were households with a female householder and no spouse or partner present. About 27.4% of all households were made up of individuals and 12.8% had someone living alone who was 65 years of age or older.

There were 1,739 housing units, of which 6.4% were vacant. The homeowner vacancy rate was 1.5% and the rental vacancy rate was 8.5%.

Jamestown racial composition
Race	Number	Percentage
White (non-Hispanic)	2,665	72.66%
Black or African American (non-Hispanic)	545	14.86%
Native American	8	0.22%
Asian	113	3.08%
Pacific Islander	2	0.05%
Other/Mixed	175	4.77%
Hispanic or Latino	160	4.36%

=== 2000 census ===
As of the census of 2000, there were 3,088 people, 1,229 households, and 924 families residing in the town. The population density was 1,159.0 inhabitants per square mile (447.5/km^{2}). There were 1,293 housing units at an average density of 485.3 per square mile (187.4/km^{2}). The racial makeup of the town was 86.79% White, 7.97% African American, 0.19% Native American, 2.40% Asian, 0.74% from other races, and 0.91% from two or more races. Hispanic or Latino of any race were 2.04% of the population.

There were 1,229 households, out of which 33.7% had children under the age of 18 living with them, 64.3% were married couples living together, 8.5% had a female householder with no husband present, and 24.8% were non-families. 20.1% of all households were made up of individuals, and 6.9% had someone living alone who was 65 years of age or older. The average household size was 2.51 and the average family size was 2.90.

In the town, the population was spread out, with 24.4% under the age of 18, 7.4% from 18 to 24, 27.8% from 25 to 44, 27.9% from 45 to 64, and 12.6% who were 65 years of age or older. The median age was 40 years. For every 100 females, there were 96.4 males. For every 100 females age 18 and over, there were 92.1 males.

The median income for a household in the town was $107,331, and the median income for a family was $77,549. Males had a median income of $58,889 versus $35,771 for females. The per capita income for the town was $29,689. About 4.5% of families and 5.3% of the population were below the poverty line, including 6.9% of those under age 18 and 1.3% of those age 65 or over.

== History ==
=== The Keyauwee ===
As early as 1701, the Keyauwee people were living in a village in this region. They enjoyed the area's mild climate, abundant natural resources, and the fertile hunting grounds along the Deep and Uwharrie rivers.

Part of a loose confederacy of 20 or more tribes, it is believed that by the 1760s, the Keyauwee had moved south, close to the boundary between the two Carolinas, where they were likely absorbed by the Catawba tribe.

=== Quaker settlement ===
By the late 18th century, European settlers came to Jamestown. Many were Quaker families who moved to the area from Pennsylvania in search of productive farmland. Among the original settlers was James Mendenhall, who established a farmstead near present-day Jamestown in 1752. Though Mendenhall moved to Georgia in 1775, his son George remained, and by 1816, he founded the village of Jamestown in honor of his father.

The Mendenhall family, who owned and operated the area's first grist and lumber mills, also owned much of the town's original land. Today, High Point City Lake is situated where the original family farmhouse and land was located.

In 1781, during the Revolutionary War, British General Cornwallis' army camped near the settlement and commandeered provisions from local farms and mills prior to his engagement with Nathanael Greene's troops at New Garden, in modern-day Greensboro.

=== 19th century ===
Historical population
Census	Pop.	Note	%±
1880	90		—
1950	748		—
1960	1,247		66.7%
1970	1,297		4.0%
1980	2,148		65.6%
1990	2,600		21.0%
2000	3,088		18.8%
2010	3,382		9.5%
2020	3,668		8.5%
U.S. Decennial Census

By 1800, Jamestown was a bustling settlement of 150 residents with its own post office, inn and Freemasons' lodge. Around this same time, gold was discovered near Jamestown, and several mines profited until the California Gold Rush frenzy shut down local efforts.

In 1811, James Mendenhall's son Richard, a local tanner, built the Mendenhall Plantation homestead, a highlight of any tour of Jamestown today.

In addition to farming and related industries, Jamestown was home to a gun factory that manufactured a muzzle-loading gun known as the "Jamestown Rifle." The rifle was a mainstay of Jamestown's industry through the latter half of the 19th century and remains a collectible among firearms enthusiasts.

During the Civil War, Jamestown's Quakers, who opposed war and violence, attempted to remain neutral. However, the Confederacy demanded that those who were able to make shoes, uniforms, or weapons continue to do so or pay heavy taxes. Records indicate that Confederate President Jefferson Davis and his entourage passed through Jamestown during their hasty retreat to the south after the Civil War ended.

Prior to the war, Jamestown was a known "stop" along the Underground Railroad, which helped fugitive slaves reach freedom in the North. According to local historical records, many Quaker homes in this area had a trap door leading to the basement to help slaves escape. Further, according to records, the Mendenhall and Beard families were instrumental in assisting in emancipation efforts.

Built in 1856, the railroad bisects Jamestown, and still provides a vital link for freight and some passengers between the port cities to the east and interior destinations.

=== 20th century ===
By April 1947, the North Carolina General Assembly granted Jamestown incorporation. Several months after incorporation, Jamestown adopted zoning districts and began construction of a municipal water system.

T. C. Ragsdale Sr. served as the town's first mayor, and Charles P. Turner was the first town manager.

In the 1950s, with a population of approximately 750, the town boasted such improvements as street lighting, water service, and a fire department.

During the 1960s, Jamestown grew quickly. Several residential neighborhoods sprang from old farmland. An ABC board was formed and a liquor store was constructed, enabling the town to pay off debt incurred for water lines as well as fund a sanitary sewer system, storm sewers, paved residential streets, the building of Town Hall in 1967, and the Jamestown Park and Golf Course in 1974. High Point's ABC board opened their first liquor store in 1976, ending Jamestown's remarkable flow of revenue.

The Former Jamestown High School, Gardner House, Jamestown Historic District, McCulloch's Gold Mill, Richard Mendenhall Plantation Buildings, Oakdale Cotton Mill Village, and Ragsdale Farm are listed on the National Register of Historic Places.

== Education ==
In 1907 the North Carolina General Assembly enacted a law providing for the creation and maintenance of public high schools in each county. Jamestown Public School, a union school, was built and became the "best equipped school" in Guilford County, with dormitories for boarding students. In 1914 the school was destroyed by fire, but a new building was completed the next year. This building now stands in the heart of Jamestown and houses the Jamestown Public Library.

The school grew steadily, and a new high school complex in Jamestown was opened in September 1959. The new high school was named for Lucy Coffin Ragsdale because of her dedication and interest to public school education in Jamestown. The first principal of Ragsdale High School was T.G. Madison, followed by Steve Dalton. Kathryn Rogers was the third principal in the history of the school. Ragsdale is one of 26 high schools in Guilford County Schools. The areas that are zoned to Ragsdale's district include areas of northeastern High Point, southeast Jamestown, and the Adams Farm/Sedgefield area of Greensboro. The school's current principal is Noel Keener.

Millis Road Elementary School opened in the fall of 1961. The first enrollment included 360 students, 12 teachers, a part-time librarian, and one principal. The intent of it being built was to relieve overcrowding in the Jamestown district. Even though the school originally had a capacity for 560 students, it at one time served a student body of 792. When the neighboring Pilot Elementary opened in the fall of 1996, the student body decreased to 330. Current enrollment is 515 students.

A variety of organizational patterns have been tried at the school, beginning with first through sixth grade, later third through fifth grade and the present pre-K through fifth grade. Millis Road students are participating in seminars led by teachers and specialists using Paidela techniques and methods. Millis Road is located in District 5 of the Guilford County School System.

To compensate for the town's growth, Jamestown has since built two more elementary schools and one more middle school. A community college, Guilford Technical Community College, provides local adults with a higher education.

== Notable people ==
- Mark Dixon, former NFL offensive lineman
- Pat McCrory, served as the 74th Governor of North Carolina from 2013 to 2017
- Mary Mendenhall Hobbs, advocate for women's education, temperance, and suffrage
- Nereus Mendenhall, member of the North Carolina House of Representatives and educator
- Siri Mullinix, keeper for the 2000 U.S. women's Olympic soccer team
- Paul Martin Newby, North Carolina Supreme Court justice
- Larry Ogunjobi, NFL defensive tackle
- Rayveness, pornographic actress
- Kasey Redfern, former NFL punter
- Clyde Simms, former MLS player
- Pep Young, former MLB player

== Climate ==
The climate in this area is characterized by relatively high temperatures and evenly distributed precipitation throughout the year. According to the Köppen Climate Classification system, Jamestown has a Humid subtropical climate, abbreviated "Cfa" on climate maps.

Climate data for Jamestown, North Carolina
Month	Jan	Feb	Mar	Apr	May	Jun	Jul	Aug	Sep	Oct	Nov	Dec	Year
Mean daily maximum °C (°F)	8 (46)	10 (50)	15 (59)	21 (69)	25 (77)	29 (84)	30 (86)	29 (84)	26 (78)	21 (69)	15 (59)	10 (50)	19 (66)
Mean daily minimum °C (°F)	−2 (28)	0 (32)	2 (35)	7 (44)	12 (53)	17 (62)	19 (66)	19 (66)	15 (59)	8 (46)	3 (37)	0 (32)	8 (46)
Average precipitation mm (inches)	86 (3.4)	84 (3.3)	97 (3.8)	84 (3.3)	91 (3.6)	97 (3.8)	110 (4.4)	110 (4.2)	91 (3.6)	84 (3.3)	71 (2.8)	81 (3.2)	1,080 (42.6)
Source: Weatherbase

== See also ==
- Jamestown News
