= Guilford College =

College in Greensboro, North Carolina, US

- Former name: New Garden Boarding School (1837–1888)
- Motto: Sapientium atque virtutum molior
- Motto in English: I am striving for wisdom and virtue
- Type: Private liberal arts college
- Established: 1837; 189 years ago
- Accreditation: SACSCOC
- Affiliations: Quakers
- Endowment: $75.3 million (2025)
- President: Jean Parvin Bordewich (acting)
- Faculty: 85
- Students: 1,429
- Location: Greensboro, North Carolina, U.S.
- Campus: Suburban, 340 acres (1.37 km^{2})
- Colors: Crimson and Gray
- Nickname: Quakers
- Sporting affiliations: NCAA Division III — ODAC
- Mascot: Nathan the Quaker
- Website: guilford.edu
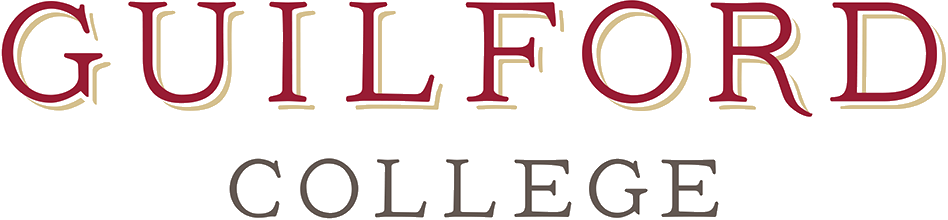

- Guilford College
- U.S. National Register of Historic Places
- U.S. Historic district
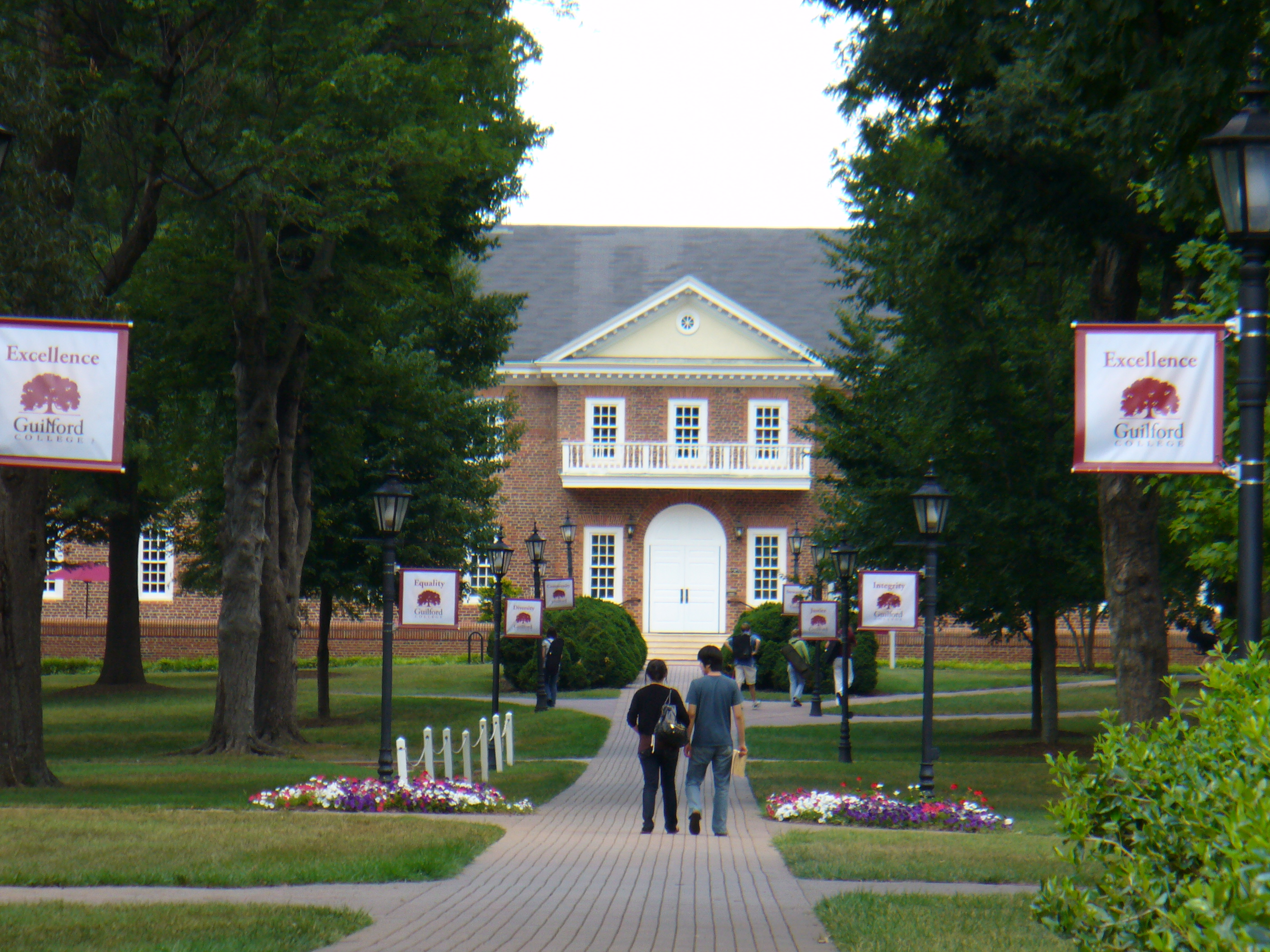
- Brick walkway through Guilford College

- Location within North Carolina
- Nearest city: Greensboro, North Carolina
- Coordinates: 36°5′43″N 79°53′19″W
- Built: 1885
- Architectural style: Colonial Revival, Classical Revival, Late Gothic Revival
- NRHP reference No.: 90000855 01000676 (decrease)

Significant dates
- Added to NRHP: June 21, 1990
- Boundary decrease: June 27, 2001

Guilford College is a private liberal arts college in Greensboro, North Carolina, United States. It was founded in 1837 by members of the Religious Society of Friends (Quakers). Guilford has both traditional students and students who attend its Center for Continuing Education (CCE).

Guilford's program offerings include such majors as Peace and Conflict Studies and Community and Justice Studies, both rooted in the college's history as a Quaker institution. Its campus has been considered a National Historic District by the United States Department of the Interior since 1990. The college is accredited by the Southern Association of Colleges and Schools Commission on Colleges.

== History ==
Guilford College is the only Quaker-founded college in the southeastern United States and the first co-ed college in the South. Opening in 1837 as "New Garden Boarding School", the institution became a four-year liberal arts college under its current name, "Guilford College", in 1888. Levi Coffin, a well-known abolitionist, Quaker, and political dissenter grew up on the land, which is now considered a historical site. The woods of New Garden, which still exist on campus today, were used as a meeting point for the Underground Railroad in the 19th century, run by Coffin.

=== 2020s financial challenges ===
Jane Fernandes, having served as president since 2014, chose to furlough and lay off colleagues during the COVID-19 pandemic and announced that she would leave office on June 30, 2020, followed by a one-year sabbatical and transition to a tenured faculty position in English; however, she left to be President of Antioch College in mid-2021.

Carol Moore was appointed the interim president and she began a "program prioritization" process that would significantly reduce the number of majors offered once approved. The college announced in November 2020 that it would likely discontinue 19 out of its 42 majors and cut 16 tenured professors. In November 2020, as a response to this plan, the faculty voted no confidence in Moore and the Board of Trustees' leadership, the first no-confidence vote in the college's history. Moore subsequently left the college and Jim Hood, a faculty member, was selected as the new interim president at the end of February 2021.

In early 2021, the college paused the November 2020 layoff plans and began significant fundraising effort, placing a hold on the layoff question until after the spring semester. As of late March 2021, the fundraising plan was slightly ahead of schedule. On January 1, 2022, Kyle Farmbry became Guilford's 10th president.

In late 2023, the college's accreditor, the Southern Association of Colleges and Schools Commission on Colleges (SACS), placed the college on probation due to its ongoing, severe financial challenges. The probation was initially for one year but in late 2024 it was extended for another year. In December 2024, while the college was on probation, president Farmbry resigned and the college's board of trustees appointed one of their own, Jean Parvin Bordewich, acting president. One year later, SACS removed the institution's probationary status after the college significantly reduced costs, including a loss of about one third of its employees, and increased fundraising.

== Student life ==
- Bryan Series: In the past decade, Guilford's Bryan Series has brought many notable speakers to the campus and city for an annual public lecture series. Past speakers have included Desmond Tutu, Mikhail Gorbachev, Colin Powell, Madeleine Albright, Bill Clinton, Tony Blair, Ken Burns, Mary Robinson, David McCullough, Toni Morrison, and Venus Williams.
- Eastern Music Festival (EMF): Every summer, the college hosts the five-week-long Eastern Music Festival (EMF), where professional and student musicians come together for seminars and public performances. Each year, EMF features more than 70 concerts and music-related events on- and off-campus.
- Serendipity: The largest campus-wide event of the year is "Serendipity", held annually in the spring. It began in 1972 as a replacement to the somewhat antiquated May Day festivities, and has featured games, musical performances, and "general mayhem." During its peak in the late 1980s and early 1990s, the weekend festival was attended by Guilford students and alumni and thousands of students from other local institutions in the Triad area. Musical acts have included Dave Matthews Band, Widespread Panic, Hootie & The Blowfish, Common, Talib Kweli, De La Soul, Luscious Jackson, The Violent Femmes, Man Man, The Village People, and The Squirrel Nut Zippers.
- WTH?! Con: This event has occurred annually since 2001. Major guests include a host of webcomic creators and wrock bands. The 2018 event attracted around 300 attendees. Peak attendance has been around 500 people. The most recent con was held the weekend of March 15, 2019.

=== Early College at Guilford ===
The Early College at Guilford ("ECG") has approximately 200 students and is located in Greensboro, North Carolina. ECG was started in 2002 as a partnership between Guilford College and Guilford County Schools as the first early college high school in North Carolina, allowing students to graduate with a high school diploma and up to two years of college credit from Guilford College.

=== WQFS ===
The radio station WQFS is run out of Founder’s Hall on the Guilford campus, and is operated by students. Broadcasts include news, lectures and a wide range of music, the latter focusing on independent labels.

== Athletics ==
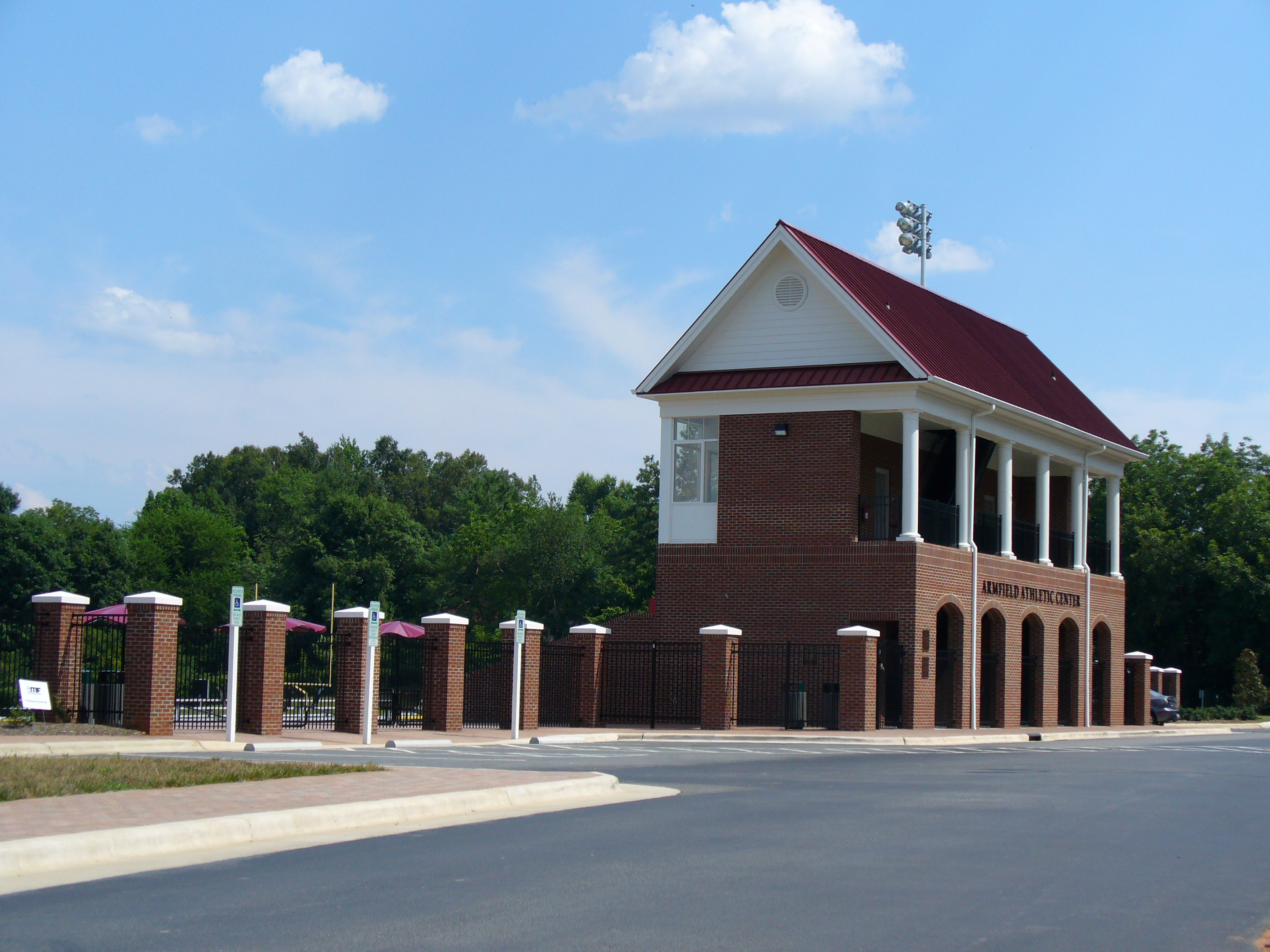
Appenzeller Field, home to Guilford's football team.

Guilford athletic teams are the Quakers. The college is a member at the Division III level of the National Collegiate Athletic Association (NCAA), primarily competing as a member of the Old Dominion Athletic Conference (ODAC) since the 1988–89 academic year. The Quakers previously competed in the Carolinas Intercollegiate Athletic Conference (CIAC, now Conference Carolinas) of the National Association of Intercollegiate Athletics (NAIA) from 1930–31 to 1987–88.

Guilford competes in 20 intercollegiate varsity sports: Men's sports include baseball, basketball, cross country, football, golf, lacrosse, soccer, tennis and track & field; while women's sports include basketball, cross country, lacrosse, rugby, soccer, softball, swimming, tennis, track & field, triathlon and volleyball.

=== Accomplishments ===
Guilford College has won five team national championships. These national championships include NAIA Division I men's basketball in 1973, NAIA women's tennis in 1981, NAIA men's golf in 1989, and NCAA Division III men's golf in 2002 and 2005.

== People ==
=== Notable alumni ===
- Mary Ann Akers: reporter for Roll Call
- William "Bill" Lindsay: professional baseball player
- M. L. Carr: professional basketball player, head coach and executive
- Howard Coble: member of U.S. House of Representatives (6th District, N.C.)
- Joseph M. Dixon: U.S. representative, Senator and Governor of Montana
- Rick Elmore: judge, North Carolina Court of Appeals
- Rick Ferrell: professional baseball player
- John Hamlin Folger: U.S. representative
- World B. Free (formerly Lloyd Free): professional basketball player
- Griff Garrison: professional wrestler
- Rick Goings: CEO of Tupperware
- Greg Jackson: professional basketball player
- Bob Kauffman: professional basketball player, coach, and manager
- Jennifer King: professional football coach
- Penelope W. Kyle: president of Radford University
- Junior Lord: professional football player
- Warren Mitofsky: inventor of the exit poll
- Dave Odom: college basketball coach
- Thomas Gilbert Pearson: secretary and later president of the National Audubon Society
- Carolyn Pfeiffer: film producer
- William Queen: author
- Grace Taylor Rodenbough: politician
- Doc Searls: journalist and author
- Ernie Shore: professional baseball player and Guilford professor
- D. H. Starbuck: North Carolina lawyer, judge, and political figure
- Ben Strong, professional basketball player
- Terry Taylor: professional wrestler
- Sam Venuto: professional football player and high school athletic director and football coach
- Tony Womack: professional baseball player and Olympic athlete
- Hunter Yurachek: college athletic director
- Tom Zachary: professional baseball player

=== Notable faculty ===
- David Hammond — director and acting teacher, former professor of theatre studies at Guilford
- Mary Mendenhall Hobbs — wife of Guilford President L.L. Hobbs, raised funds for women's education
- David Newton — American sculpture artist, worked at Guilford as an art professor
- Adam Daniel Beittel — minister and former president of Tougaloo College
