= List of botanical gardens and arboretums in Washington (state) =

This list of botanical gardens and arboretums in Washington is intended to include all significant botanical gardens and arboretums in the U.S. state of Washington.

Name	Image	Affiliation	City	Coordinates
Bellevue Botanical Garden			Bellevue	47°36′33″N 122°10′44″W
Bloedel Reserve			Bainbridge Island	47°42′30″N 122°32′52″W
Bonhoeffer Botanical Gardens			Stanwood	48°16′0.48″N 122°15′54.72″W
Evergreen Arboretum and Gardens			Everett	48°0′45.35″N 122°12′8.49″W
Carl S. English Jr. Botanical Gardens			Seattle	47°40′0.48″N 122°23′51.36″W
John A. Finch Arboretum			Spokane	47°38′27.51″N 117°28′1.03″W
Heronswood			Kingston	47°49′15″N 122°32′56″W
Highline Botanical Garden			SeaTac	47°28′48″N 122°18′10″W
Hulda Klager Lilac Gardens			Woodland	45°53′49.92″N 122°45′12.24″W
Kruckeberg Botanic Garden			Shoreline	47°46′34.68″N 122°22′35.76″W
Lake Wilderness Arboretum			Maple Valley	47°22′50″N 122°02′27″W
Lakewold Gardens			Lakewood	47°8′42″N 122°32′13.2″W
Manito Park and Botanical Gardens			Spokane	47°38′8.52″N 117°24′42.12″W
Meerkerk Rhododendron Gardens			Greenbank	48°4′51.96″N 122°33′42.48″W
Rhododendron Species Foundation and Botanical Garden			Federal Way	47°17′34.08″N 122°18′8.28″W
Seattle Chinese Garden			Seattle	47°33′5″N 122°21′15″W
Sehome Hill Arboretum			Bellingham	48°44′00″N 122°28′48″W
South Seattle College Arboretum		South Seattle College	Seattle	47°33′5″N 122°21′13″W
Washington Park Arboretum		University of Washington	Seattle	47°38′13.2″N 122°17′45.6″W
Washington State Capitol Conservatory		Washington State Capitol campus	Olympia	47°2′15.72″N 122°54′13.32″W
Wind River Arboretum		Gifford Pinchot National Forest	Carson	45°47′57″N 121°56′4″W
Point Defiance Park		Point Defiance Zoo & Aquarium	Tacoma	47°18′36″N 122°31′48″W
Wright Park Arboretum			Tacoma	47°15′37.08″N 122°26′53.88″W
Yakima Area Arboretum			Yakima	46°35′13″N 120°28′22″W

== See also ==
- List of botanical gardens and arboretums in the United States
