= Aaron Titlow =

Washington state politician (1857–1923)

Aaron Rosser Titlow
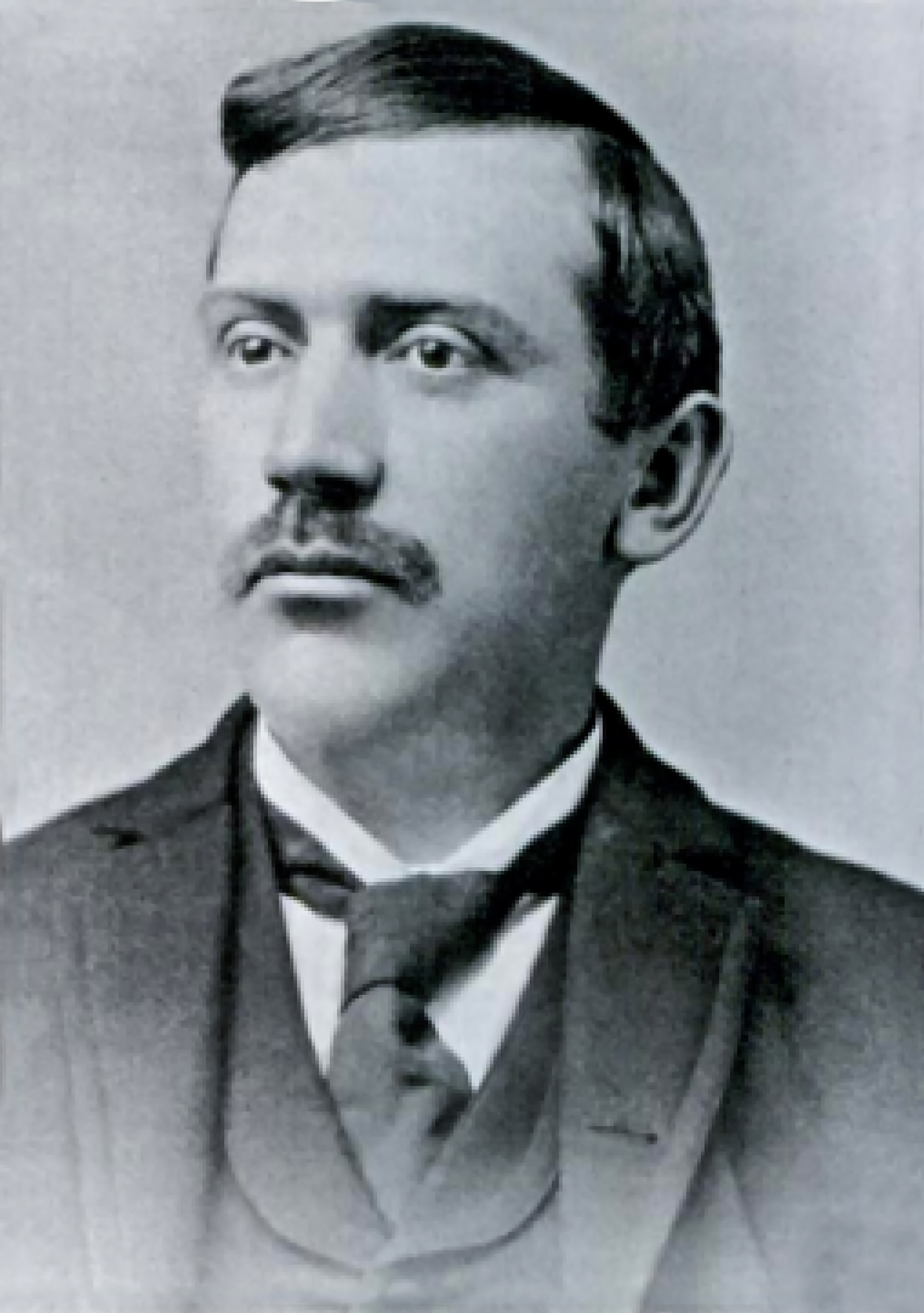
- Born: November 22, 1857; Montgomery County, Ohio, US
- Died: January 6, 1923 (aged 65); Tacoma, Washington Territory, US
- Burial place: Tacoma Cemetery, Tacoma, Washington
- Education: Washington University in St. Louis
- Years active: 1886–1922
- Known for: Political influence among Washington state democrats; Titlow Beach
- Title: Democratic National Committeeman from the state of Washington
- Term: 1920–1923
- Predecessor: Hugh C. Wallace
- Successor: George Francis Christensen
- Political party: Republican until 1896, then Democrat
- Spouse: Stella (Smart) Titlow
- Children: 6 (5 survived)

Aaron Rosser Titlow (November 22, 1857 – January 6, 1923) was a Washington state lawyer and politician. Titlow served as a prosecuting attorney for Pierce County from 1896 to 1898 and was the Democratic National Committeeman from the state of Washington from 1920 to 1923. As of 2020, he is best remembered for Titlow Beach, a popular 75-acre (30 ha) waterfront public park in Tacoma which was purchased from Titlow's family in 1928 by Metro Parks Tacoma.

Titlow settled in Tacoma, Washington, in 1888 and made many successful real estate investments that brought him wealth and prominence. As a lawyer, he was involved in several high-profile cases, defending public interest against corporate interests. In 1893, he won a court case representing the public interest against the Tacoma City Council and Tacoma Light and Water Company, saving $787,000 ($22.6 million in 2020 dollars (Note: The approximate value converted to 2020 dollars, based on a standard adjustment of the 1913 dollar value using the Consumer Price Index as calculated by United States Department of Labor.)) in public money. In 1909, Titlow protected his real estate interests and public access rights to the waterfront, fending off James J. Hill and Northern Pacific Railroad's attempt to monopolize the Tacoma waterfront.

Although Titlow did not hold any public office (with the exception of his two-year prosecuting attorney term), he became an influential political figure in Washington state as a Democratic Party factioneer. Titlow was a campaign manager for George Turner, contributing to his election to the US Senate and supported James M. Cox during the presidential election of 1920.

As of 2020, Titlow's residence on Sheridan Avenue in Tacoma and the remnants of his Hesperides Hotel on Titlow Beach (now known as Titlow Lodge) are historic landmarks.

== Early life and education ==
Titlow was born on a farm near Dayton, Ohio, on November 22, 1857, into a family of Dutch ancestry. Two years after Titlow's birth, his father, Aaron Titlow (1829–1912), and his mother, Jane (Casad) Titlow (1831–1914) moved to Delphi, Indiana, in search of better farming opportunities. Titlow grew up on his parents' farm and attended Delphi public school. He had four sisters: Alice Ann (1855–1925), Mead G. (1865–1937), Read S. (1870–1917), and Lora (1872–1951).

While in school, Titlow developed an ambition to become a lawyer and studied Blackstone's Commentaries on the Laws of England at Delphi. He later entered the law department of the Washington University in St. Louis, and graduated one year ahead of his class in 1885.

== Early law career ==
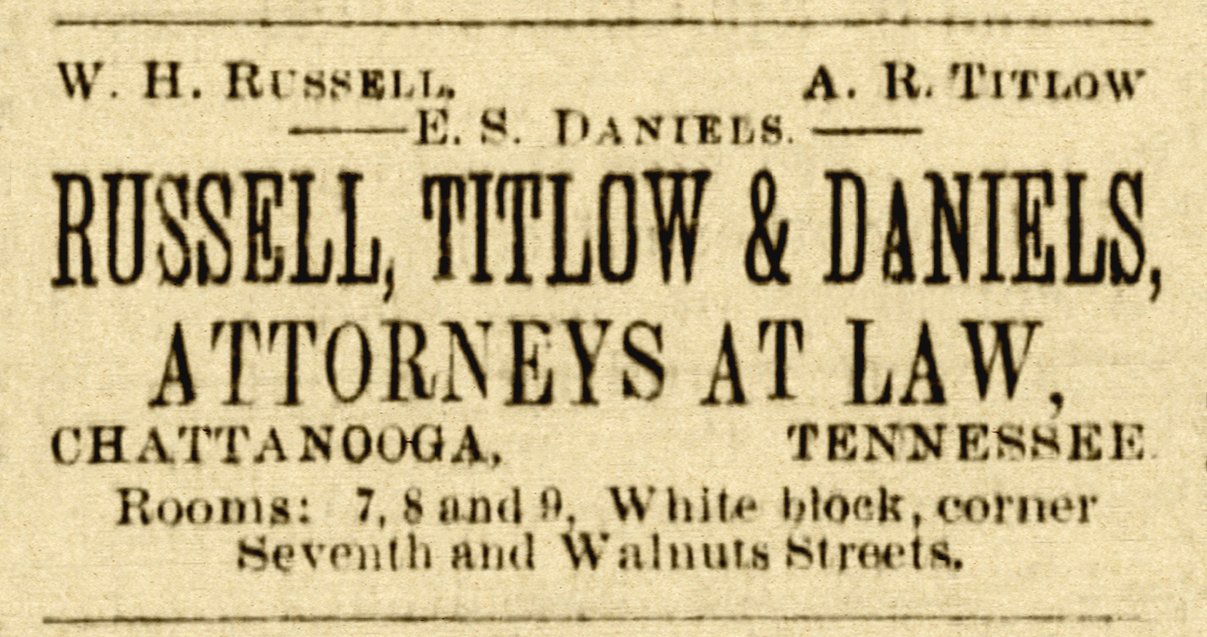
Russel, Titlow and Daniels advertisement, The Chattanooga Commercial, September 1887

After graduating, Titlow returned to Delphi and was admitted to the bar. However, in search of more lucrative opportunities for his law practice, he decided to move. In 1886, he borrowed $60 ($1,670 in 2020 dollars) and moved south to Chattanooga, Tennessee, where he was welcomed by the local community. First, he practiced in a small new law firm, Titlow and Walker, which operated from an office on Seventh Avenue. A year later, Titlow joined two experienced lawyers who had recently moved from Indiana, and they formed a new law firm: Russel, Titlow, and Daniels. The new firm focused on business law, and Titlow began specializing in real estate cases.

Although Titlow was well received in Chattanooga and formed many friendships, he decided to move again to find better professional opportunities. In 1888, just as Washington Territory was about to join the Union and become Washington state, Titlow moved to Tacoma, Washington.

== Career in Tacoma ==
=== Early legal career and real estate dealings ===
Titlow came to Tacoma in 1888 and later formed the law firm Titlow & Applegate. He also invested all the earnings he had accumulated in Tennessee, into Tacoma real estate. This investment proved to be very successful, propelling Titlow from "rags to riches." In addition to Tacoma, many of Titlow's real estate holdings were in Gig Harbor and on Fox Island. By 1903, Titlow owned three farms and approximately 300 lots in the Tacoma vicinity.

==== High profile cases ====
In 1893, the Tacoma City Council voted to purchase Tacoma Light and Water Company for $1,750,000, while the value of the company's assets was estimated to be under $600,000 ($50 million and $17 million in 2020 dollars respectively.) Although the purchase was explained away as the city's way to escape the "corporate grip," it was rumored that the Light and Water Company had spent $50,000 ($1.5 million in 2020 dollars.) to carry the City Council vote in the favor of the purchase. Titlow raised the alarm, doubting that the purchase conformed with public interest. On April 7, 1893, he publicly debated councilman John W. Berry on the issue. Unable to convince the City council, Titlow took the matter to court, joined by John A. Shackleford. Titlow and Shackleford won the case, securing a $787,000 ($22.6 million in 2020 dollars) judgement against the Light and Water company. The case earned Titlow the reputation of a person who couldn't be bought by corporate interests.

On September 14, 1895, Titlow was appointed as receiver for two bankrupt institutions: the Bank of Tacoma and the Tacoma Trust and Savings Bank. He led a "sensational" investigation that unearthed dubious dealings in municipal bonds and eventually led to the arrests of the banks' management in October 1895.

In 1909, Titlow entered a legal battle with Northern Pacific Railroad around Tacoma waterfront access. The railroad's local interests in Tacoma were personified by railroad magnate James J. Hill. Titlow framed the battle as a fight for public interest against the railroad's monopoly on waterfront access; however, Titlow had his own financial interest in the matter, as the railroad's plans would have interfered with the ferry service between Tacoma and Fox Island, the location of many of his real estate interests. The railroad eventually abandoned its plans.

=== Political career ===
Titlow was a Republican until 1896, when he switched allegiance and became a Democrat. He claimed that he was dissatisfied with the Republican party's handling of the "money question." That same year, Titlow was elected on a Democratic ticket as a prosecuting attorney for Pierce County, replacing his former ally John A. Shackleford. Titlow served in this capacity until 1898, and that remained the only political office that Titlow served.

Beginning in 1896, Titlow emerged as an active and high-profile Washington state politician. Although he never sought public office after 1898, Titlow developed influence and prominence through his appointments within the Democratic party. In 1896, Titlow publicly supported Washington state governor and populist John R. Rogers. In 1897, he managed George Turner's successful campaign for the US Senate.

In later years, Titlow became a strong ally of Hugh C. Wallace, succeeding him as the Washington state Democratic National Committeeman on May 19, 1920. As committeeman, Titlow succeeded in modifying the party platform to Tacoma's advantage: he included a provision for equal division of vessels between Atlantic and Pacific fleets, which benefitted Tacoma and Seattle among other ports along the Pacific Coast.

Titlow was a strong favorite of the free silver measure and a strong supporter of William Jennings Bryan, the Democratic party heavyweight of the time. As Democratic National Committee chairman Homer S. Cummings retired, Titlow supported the candidacy of Eliakim H. Moore for the post, but the chairmanship went to George White.

Titlow supported the re-election bid of Woodrow Wilson's campaign for a third presidential term. However, once it became clear that Wilson wouldn't attempt re-election for health reasons, Titlow opposed James A. Reed and supported James M. Cox as the presidential nominee in 1920. Titlow believed that Cox would carry Washington state and win the presidency. After Cox lost the presidential election to Republican Warren G. Harding in a landslide, Titlow initially advocated for the immediate resignation of the party chairman, George White, but later withdrew his signature.

=== Career in hospitality ===
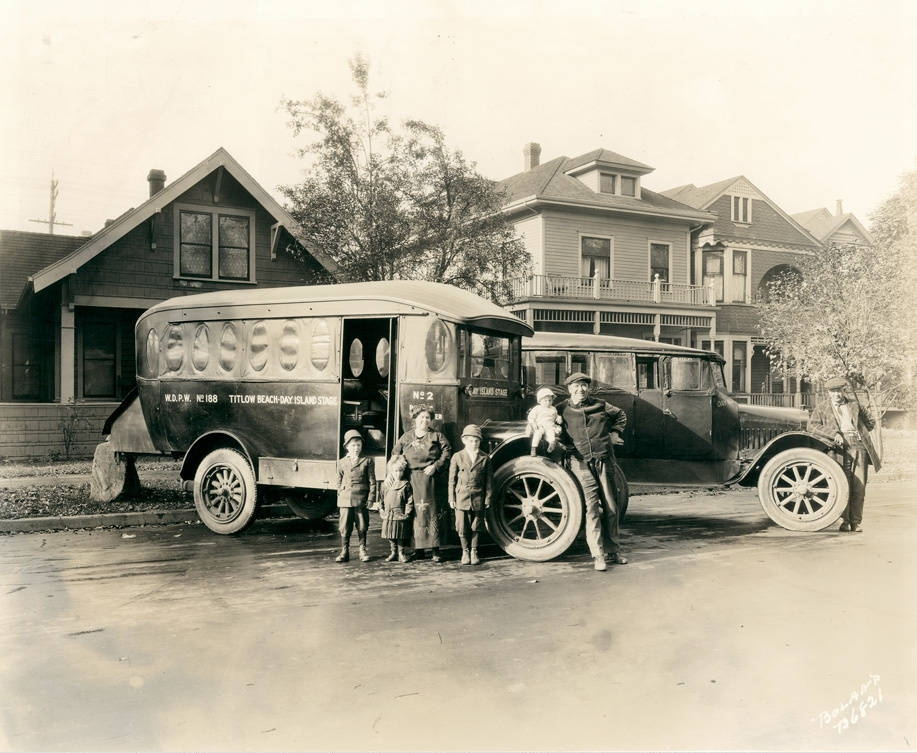
A bus, operating between Fox Island and Titlow Beach, 1922

In 1911, Titlow built the Hesperides Hotel which was designed by famous Tacoma architect Frederick Heath in the Swiss chalet style. The 3.5-story wood-frame building cost $50,000 ($1.4 million in 2020 dollars) and had 30 guest rooms. It was built on 75-acre (30 ha) waterfront property that Titlow acquired in 1903, and is currently known as Titlow Park. This property was an important cornerstone of Titlow's real estate holdings, as it was the terminal end of the ferry service, connecting Tacoma with Gig Harbor and Fox Island—the sites of Titlow's other major real estate investments. In 1909, Titlow fought railroad magnate James J. Hill and Northern Pacific Railroad in court to protect the waterfront access and ferry operation.

The construction of the hotel was a long-lasting dream of Titlow's, and he and his family operated the hotel. Titlow's son Marcus worked as a bellboy. All the food for the hotel was supplied by one of the Titlow's farms.

The hotel offered the most luxurious amenities of the era: bathrooms with hot water, a barber shop, pool tables, a variety of boats for exploring Puget Sound (including a glass-bottom boat) with glass bottom, and a salt-water public pool, the first public pool in the Tacoma area. Although Titlow's plans to obtain a liquor license for the hotel were thwarted by local women activists of the temperance movement, the hotel developed into a popular resort. The hotel rooms were often occupied by upper-class citizens. Other amenities were frequented by the middle-class public who arrived either in personal automobiles (which were becoming more and more popular) or via a dedicated bus service. The location of the hotel—at the ferry terminal stop for Gig Harbor and Fox Island—contributed to its popularity.

== Personal life and death ==
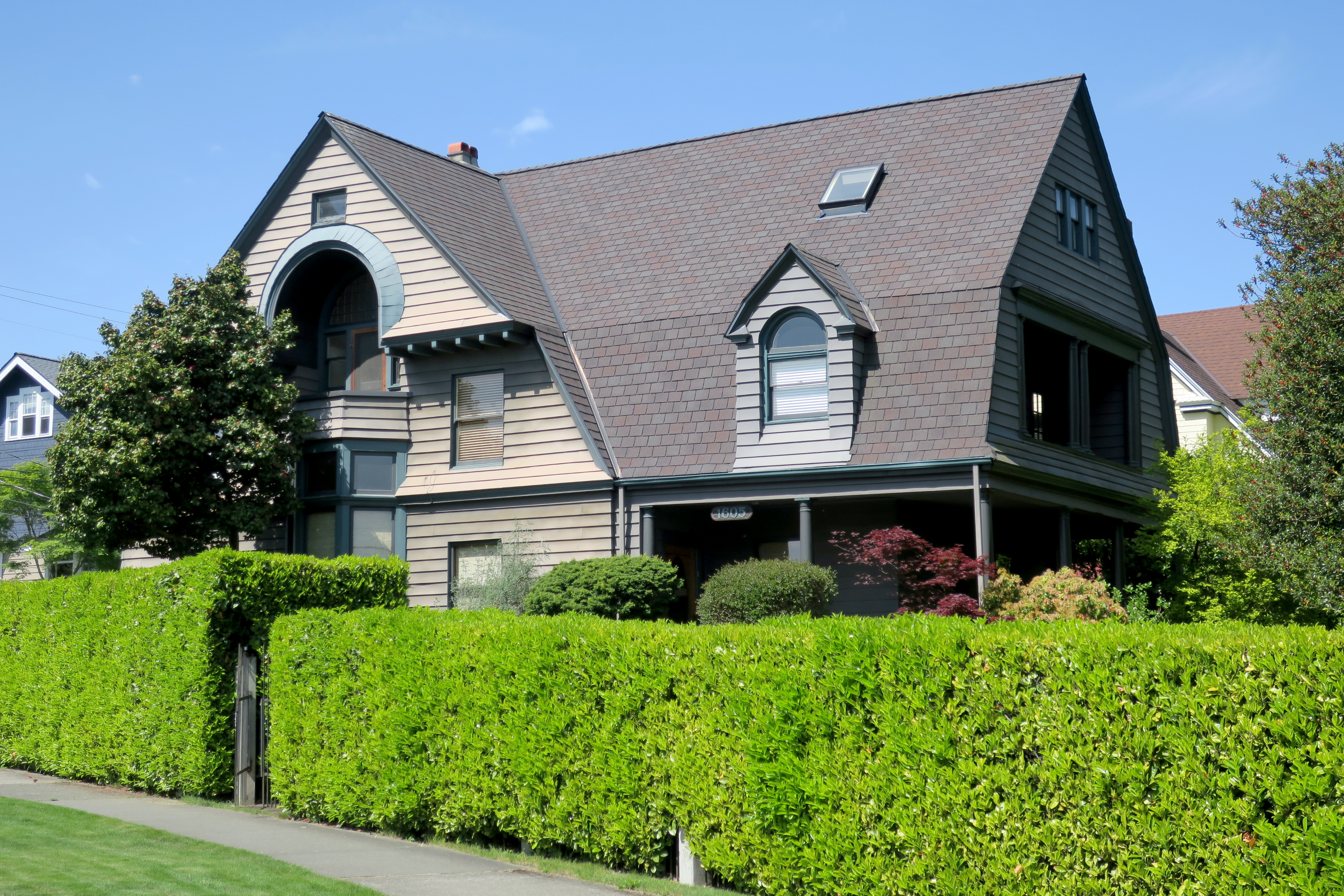
Former Titlow's residence, 2020

On April 26, 1893, Titlow married Stella Smart (1870–1936), who was from his hometown of Dayton. By 1903, the family included three daughters: Ione M. (1894–1981), Constance (1896–1979), Marcelle Isabelle (1899–1983). Aaron Rosser Jr. (b. 1902) died during infancy. The couple later had two more children: Lucile (1904–1990) and Marcus R. (1906–1995).

In Tacoma, the family lived in a luxurious, Colonial Revival-styled house at 410 South Sheridan Street, (ATTACHED PICTURE IS INCORRECT) which was custom-built for Titlow in 1899 Titlow was an active member of Phi Delta Phi society, and a parishioner of the Episcopal Church

Titlow died on January 6, 1923, after a "lingering illness." He was survived by his wife and five children.

== Legacy ==
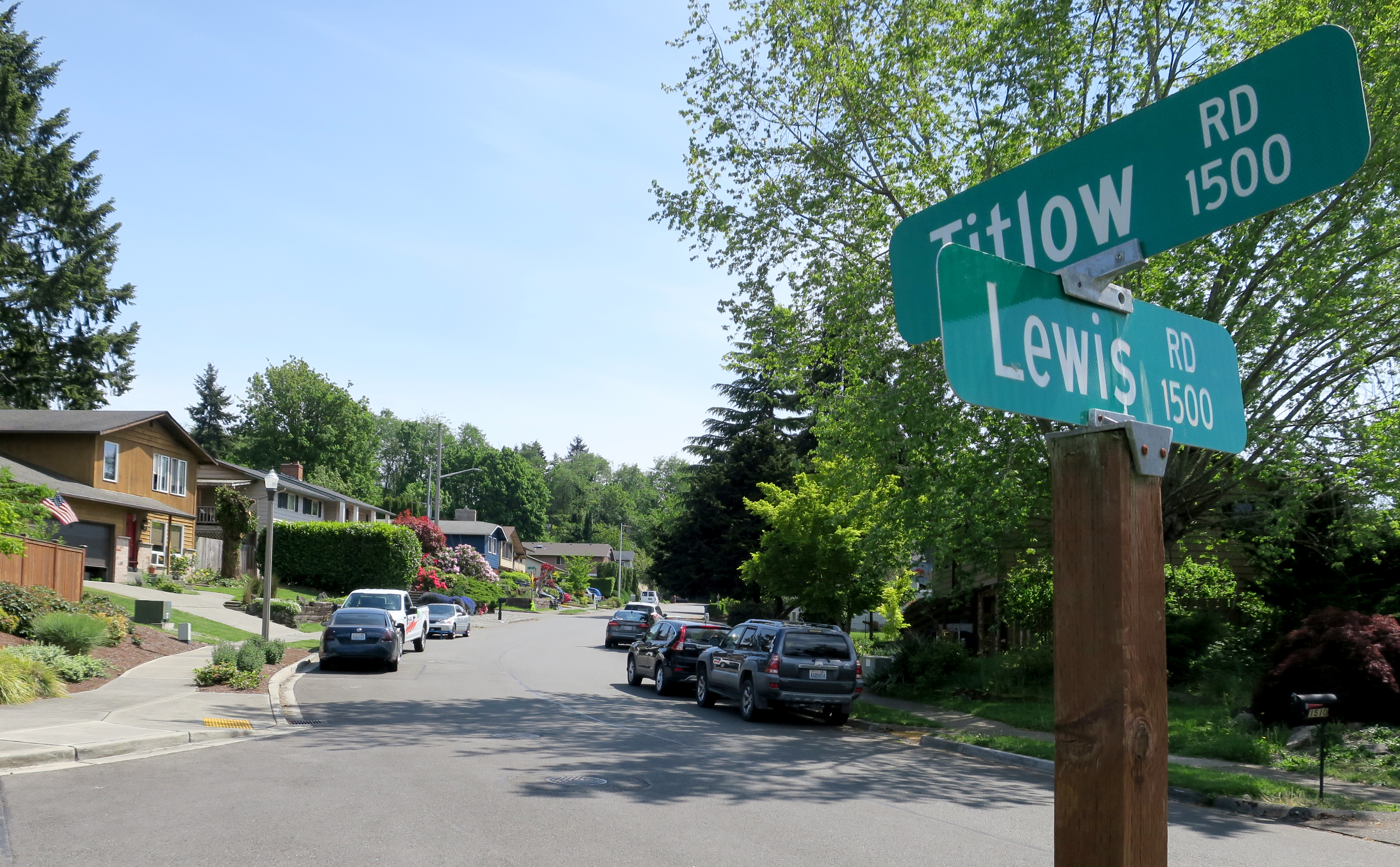
South Titlow Road, Tacoma

After Titlow's death in 1923, his position as the Democratic National Committeeman was filled by George Francis Christensen. Shortly after Titlow's death, his house on Sheridan Street was purchased by a contractor, Andrew Larson, who remodeled it as a multi-family unit. As of 2010, the house is part of Tacoma's historic Wedge District and attraction #16 of the city center historic tour.

The City of Tacoma named a road after Titlow—South Titlow Road, the 6th Avenue. In Tacoma, however, Titlow is best known for Titlow Beach. In 1928, five years after Titlow's death, the family sold the Titlow Beach property and Hesperides Hotel to Metro Parks Tacoma, and it was converted to a public park. During the Great Depression, Metro Parks planned to demolish the hotel, but the local community protested this decision. In 1938, the hotel was renovated. Its upper stories were removed, and it was converted into a community center now known as Titlow Lodge. On April 12, 2018, Titlow Lodge was designated as a Tacoma Historic Landmark.

After the construction of the Tacoma Narrows Bridge, the ferries to Gig Harbor and Fox Island became obsolete. In 1958, the salt-water pool on the property was converted into a fresh water pool. It is being serviced by Titlow pumping station. As of 2020, Titlow Beach remains a popular year-round destination for the local community. Titlow Lodge is used for weddings and other community gatherings. Its three miles of designated trails is part of Tacoma Urban Trails. Descendants of Aaron Titlow from different parts of US gathered on Titlow Beach in September 2015.

Titlow Park and the vicinity, May 2020

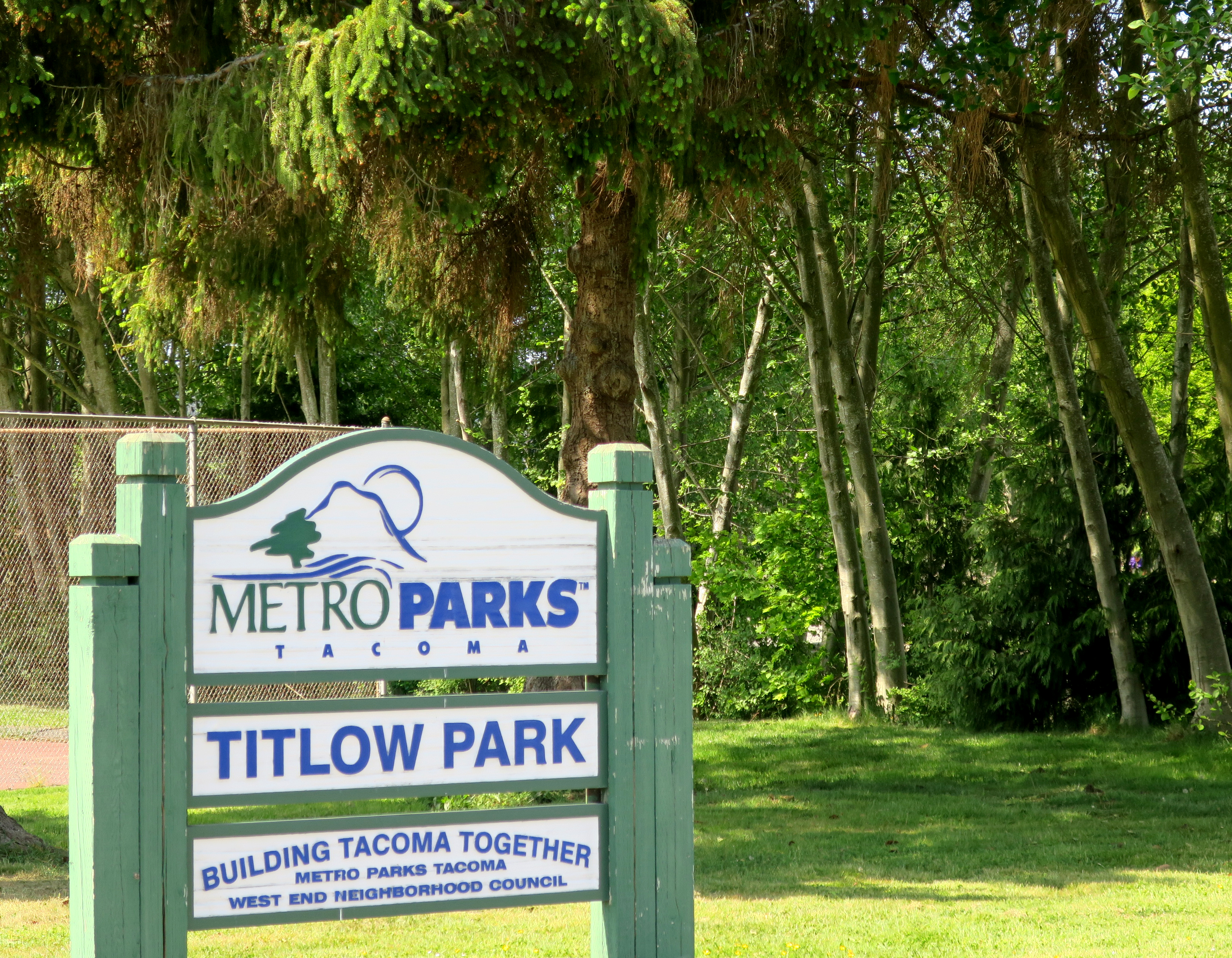
Titlow Park sign

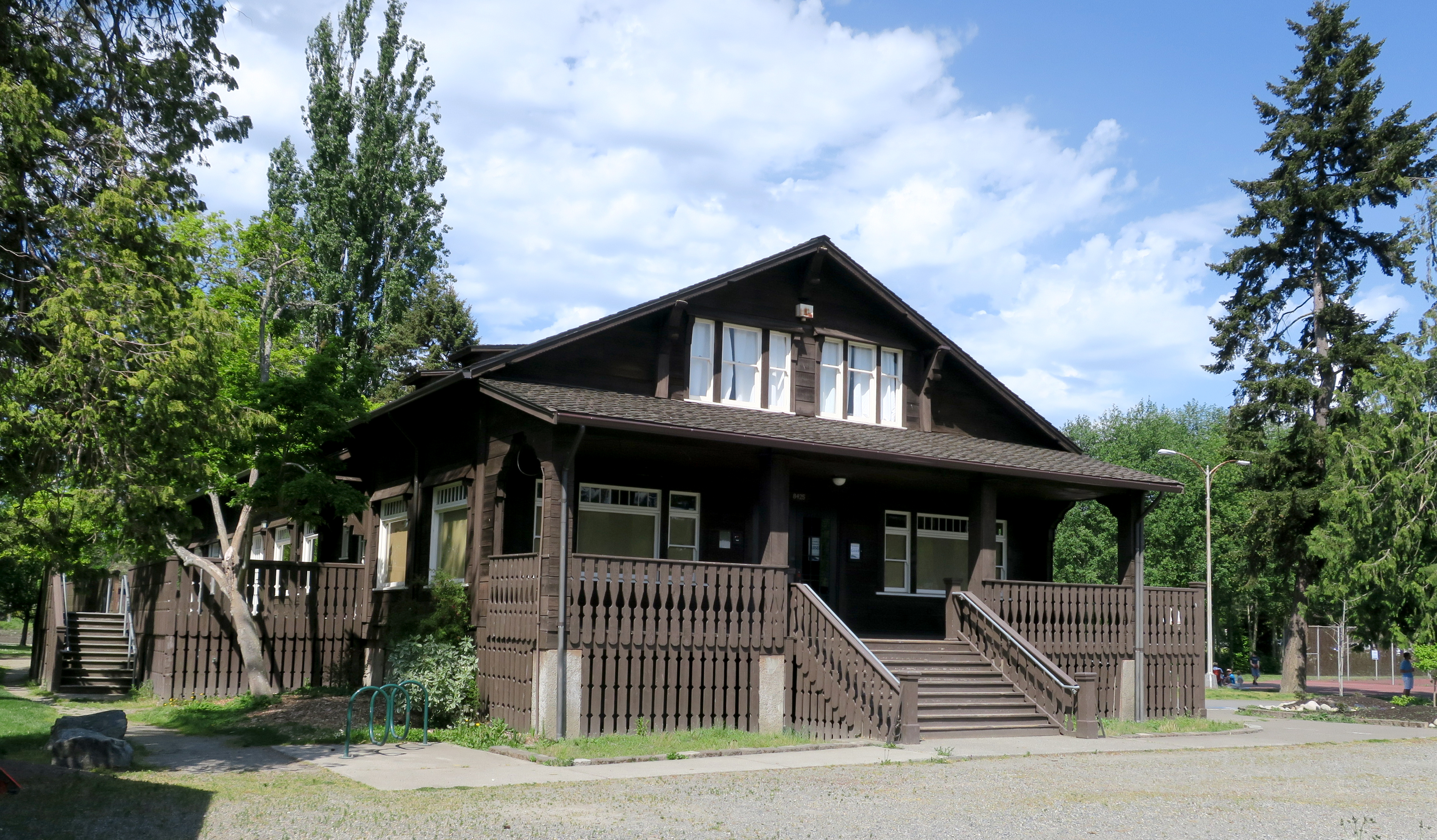
Titlow Lodge, front view

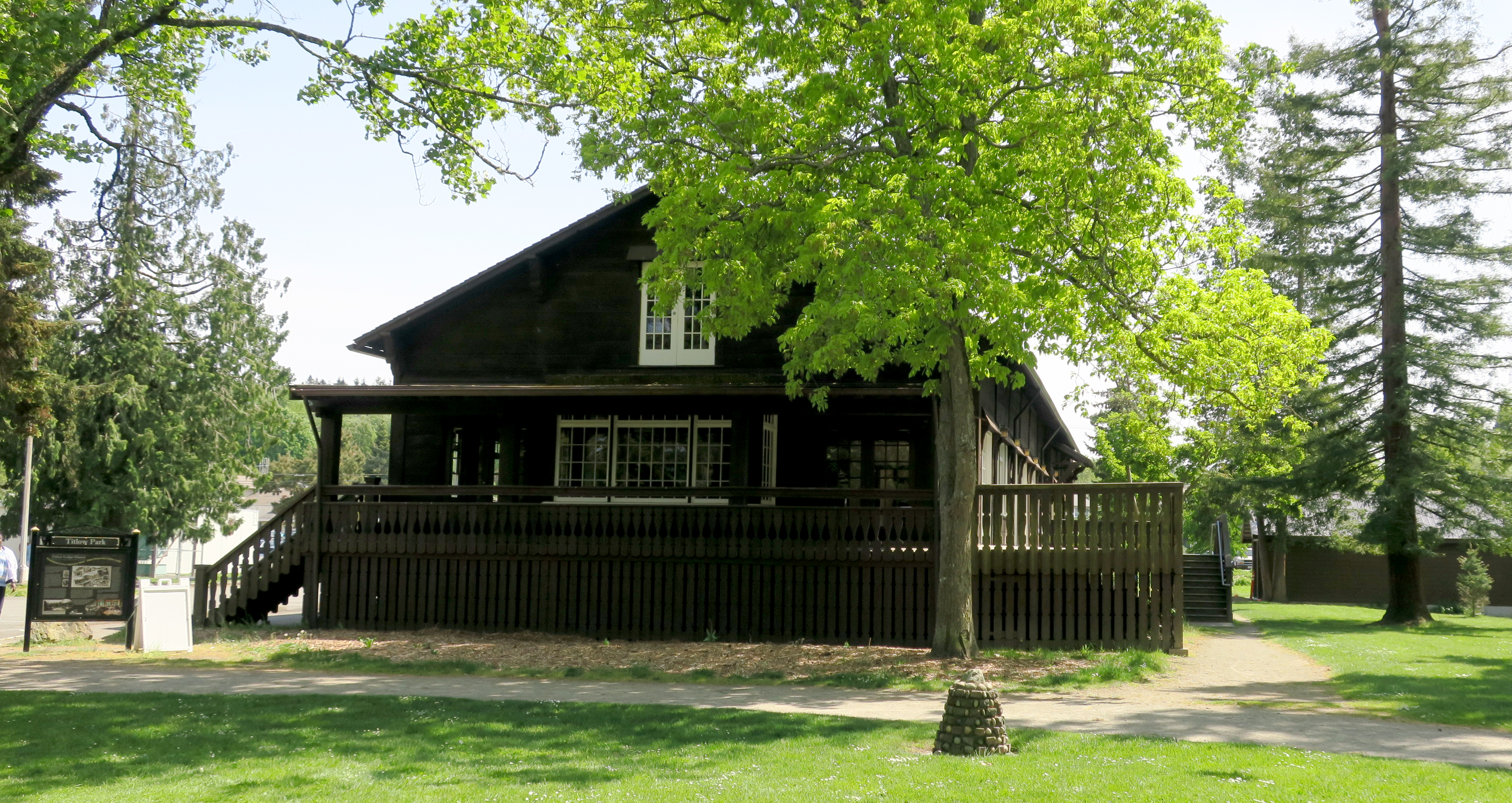
Titlow Lodge, back view

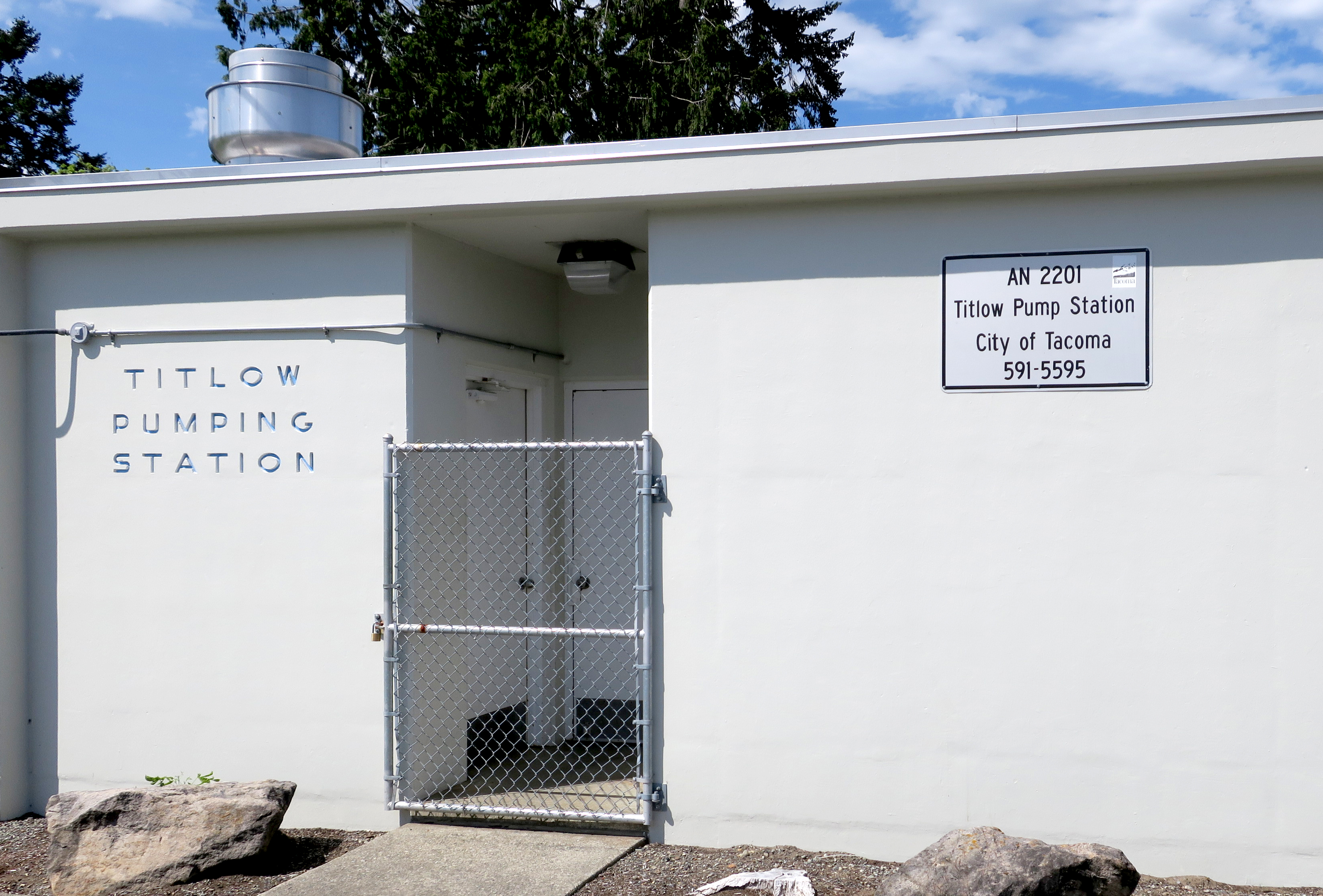
The pumping station

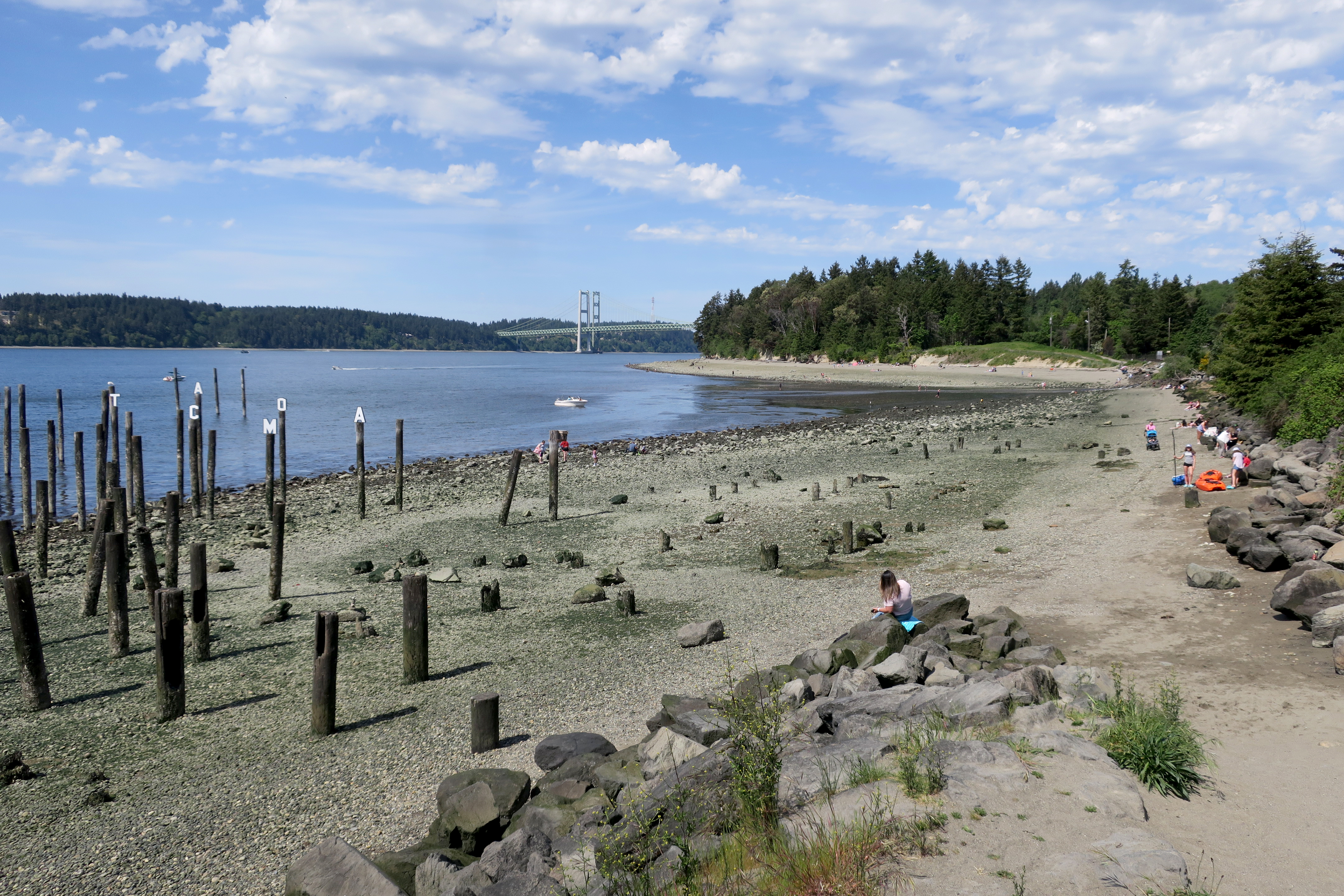
Titlow beach and the remnants of ferry piers

== Literature cited ==
- "They still come", Chattanooga Commercial, Chattanooga: Commercial Print, p. 1, August 22, 1886, OCLC 15540990
- "New law firm", Chattanooga Daily Times, Chattanooga: Adolph Ochs, p. 4, August 21, 1887, OCLC 648884784
- "The Fraternities", Chattanooga Daily Times, Chattanooga: Adolph Ochs, p. 5, March 26, 1888, OCLC 648884784
- "A corporation grip", Seattle Post-Intelligencer, Seattle: Leigh S. J. Hunt, p. 1, April 8, 1893, ISSN 2379-7304, LCCN sn83045604, OCLC 9563195
- "Bonds for Wheeler", Seattle Post-Intelligencer, Seattle: Leigh S. J. Hunt, p. 1, October 7, 1895, ISSN 2379-7304, LCCN sn83045604, OCLC 9563195
- Katzenberger, George A., ed. (1898), Catalogue of the Legal Fraternity of Phi Delta Phi (PDF), vol. 7, Ann Arbor: Inland Press, LCCN 07019140, OCLC 13352450
- Scripps, Edward, ed. (November 14, 1909), "Shall Tacoma break Jim Hill's grasp?", The Tacoma Times, Tacoma: E. W. Scripps Company, p. 1, ISSN 2158-4729, LCCN sn88085187, OCLC 17347623
- Scripps, Edward, ed. (November 19, 1909), "Jim Hill makes a new move to bottle up the city's west waterfront", The Tacoma Times, Tacoma: E. W. Scripps Company, p. 4, ISSN 2158-4729, LCCN sn88085187, OCLC 17347623
- Scripps, Edward, ed. (April 7, 1913), "Titlow refused license at his beach hotel", The Tacoma Times, Tacoma: E. W. Scripps Company, p. 8, ISSN 2158-4729, LCCN sn88085187, OCLC 17347623
- "Regulars win in demo meet", Seattle Star, vol. 23, Seattle: E. W. Scripps, p. 2, May 19, 1920, ISSN 2159-5577, LCCN sn87093407, OCLC 17285351
- "Reed is barred from convention", New York Times, New York: H.J. Raymond & Co, p. 1, June 27, 1920, ISSN 0362-4331, LCCN sn78004456, OCLC 1645522
- "Democrats will win Washington from Idaho to the sea – Titlow", Spokane Chronicle, Spokane: Cowles Company, p. 19, July 16, 1920, LCCN sn86072020, OCLC 14374699
- "Another drops out of white attack", New York Times, New York: H.J. Raymond & Co, p. 3, February 11, 1921, ISSN 0362-4331, LCCN sn78004456, OCLC 1645522
- "A. R. Titlow, democratic national committeeman, dies", Tribune, Tacoma: Tribune Pub. Co., p. 1, January 6, 1923, LCCN sn86072045, OCLC 14402924
- "A. R. Titlow dies", Seattle Daily Times, Seattle: The Seattle Times Company, p. 3, January 6, 1923, ISSN 2639-4898, LCCN sn86072007, OCLC 1765328
- "Titlow rites held monday", Seattle Post-Intelligencer, Seattle: Leigh S. J. Hunt, p. 9, January 7, 1923, ISSN 0745-970X, LCCN sn83045605, OCLC 3734418
- "Death summons party leader", The Spokesman-Review, Spokane: Cowles Company, p. 3, January 9, 1923, ISSN 1064-7317, LCCN sn84024754, OCLC 11102610
- Piper, Edgar B., ed. (February 13, 1923), "Christensen is chosen", Morning Oregonian, Portland: Oregonian Media Group, p. 7, ISSN 8750-1317, LCCN sn83025138, OCLC 9278209
- "George Christensen state committeeman", Seattle Daily Times, Seattle: The Seattle Times Company, p. 7, February 13, 1923, ISSN 2639-4898, LCCN sn86072007, OCLC 1765328
- Heller, Otto; Duncan, Thomas Shearer; Suss Langsdorf, Alexander, eds. (April 1, 1923), "Alumni Notes", Washington University record, vol. XVIII, no. IV, St. Louis: Washington University, p. 48, ISSN 0745-2136, OCLC 5538399
- "Tacoma City Council declares Titlow Lodge a historic landmark", tacomadailyindex.com, Surrey: Black Press, April 12, 2018, OCLC 1130597550
- Ashton, Adam (September 16, 2015), "Titlows return to Tacoma's Titlow Beach, rowboat in tow", thenewstribune.com, Tacoma: The News Tribune, ISSN 1073-5860, LCCN sn93003470, OCLC 31260618
- Bonney, William Pierce (1927), Hanford, Cornelius (ed.), History of Pierce County, Chicago: Pioneer Historical Publishing Company, LCCN 95109999, OCLC 10442109
- Dunkelberger, Steven (March 8, 2018), "Titlow primed for historical designation", tacomaweekly.com, Tacoma: Tacoma Weekly News, OCLC 893921758, archived from the original on June 13, 2018
- Hunt, Herbert (1916), Tacoma its history and its builders; a half century of activity, vol. 1, Chicago: S. J. Clarke Publishing Company, LCCN 18005073, OCLC 656923949
- Prosser, William Farrand (1903), Lewis, Edward Gardner (ed.), A history of the Puget Sound country, its resources, its commerce and its people, New York City: Edward Gardner Lewis, LCCN 05013767
- Reisinger, Kris Anderson (2011), "Rags to riches", Cemeteries of Tacoma, Images of America, Charleston: Arcadia Publishing, p. 21, ISBN 978-0738575315, LCCN 2010942564, OCLC 706018742
- Romano, Craig (2019), Cusick, Erin (ed.), Urban trails. Tacoma: Federal Way, Auburn, Puyallup, Anderson Island, Seattle: Mountaineers Books, pp. 32–34, ISBN 978-1680512250, LCCN 2019945518, OCLC 1091367615
- Swope, Caroline T.; Clarkson, Erin E. (2009), Wedge District Walking Tour (PDF), Tacoma: Tacoma Historical Society
- "CPI Inflation Calculator", Bureau of Labor Statistics, Washington: United States Department of Labor
