= Chinese Garden (disambiguation) =

A Chinese garden is a style of garden.

Chinese Garden may also refer to:

- Dunedin Chinese Garden, a Chinese garden in Dunedin, New Zealand
- Seattle Chinese Garden, a Chinese garden in Seattle, Washington, United States
- Chinese Garden, Singapore, a Chinese garden in Singapore
  - Chinese Garden MRT station, a railway station in Singapore
- Chinese Garden, Zurich, a Chinese garden in Zurich, Switzerland
