= Scott Crichton (American football) =

American football player (born 1991)

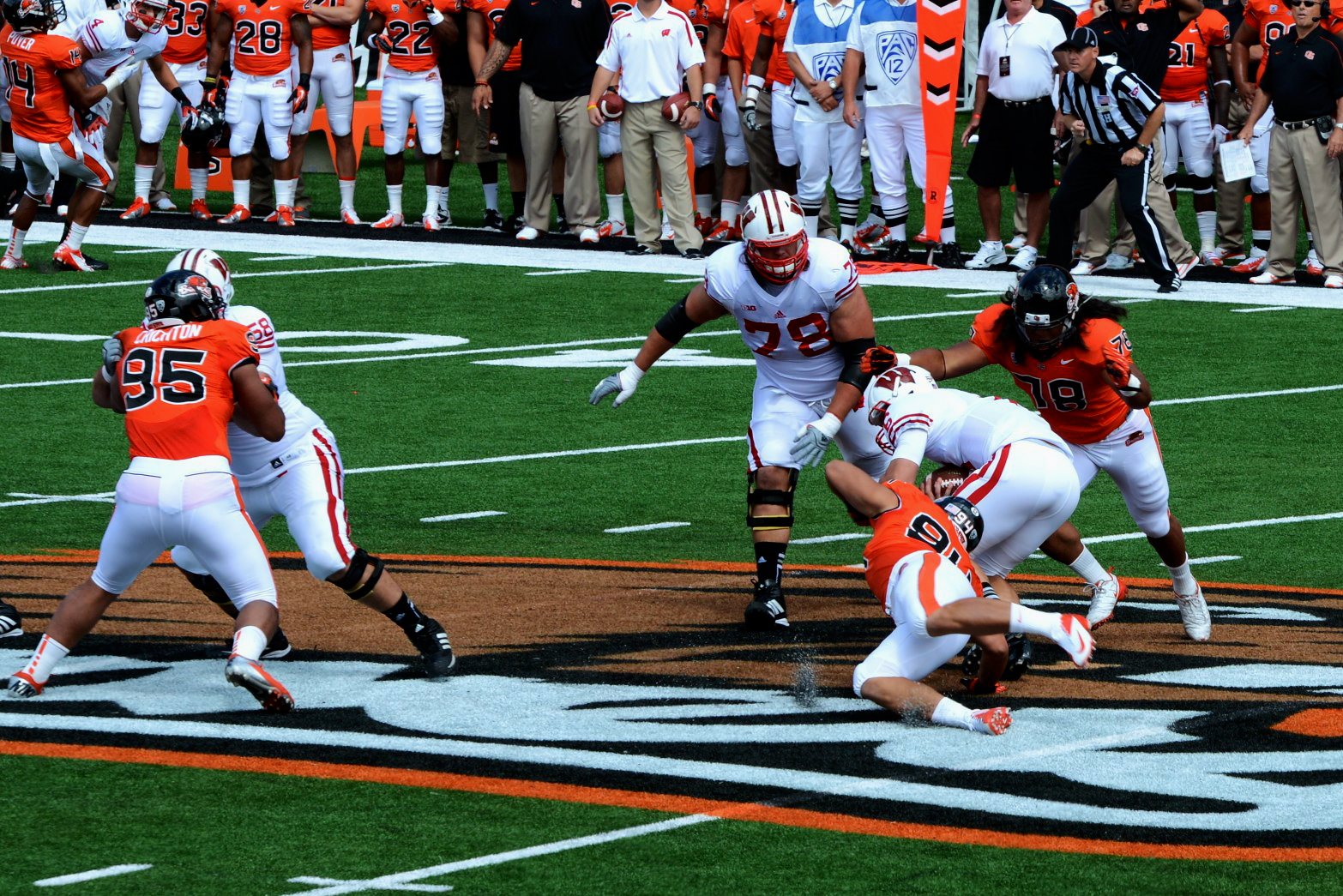

No. 95
- Position: Defensive end

Personal information
- Born: October 30, 1991 (age 35); Tacoma, Washington, U.S.
- Listed height: 6 ft 3 in (1.91 m)
- Listed weight: 273 lb (124 kg)

Career information
- High school: Henry Foss (Tacoma)
- College: Oregon State (2010–2013)
- NFL draft: 2014: 3rd round, 72nd overall pick

Career history
- Minnesota Vikings (2014–2016); Buffalo Bills (2017)*
- * Offseason or practice squad member only

Awards and highlights
- Freshman All-American (2011); First-team All-Pac-12 (2012); Second-team All-Pac-12 (2013)

Career NFL statistics
- Total tackles: 7
- Stats at Pro Football Reference

Scott Jackson Crichton (born October 30, 1991) is an American former professional football player who was a defensive end in the National Football League (NFL). He played college football for the Oregon State Beavers and was selected by the Minnesota Vikings in the third round, 72nd overall of the 2014 NFL draft.

== Early life ==
Crichton was born in Tacoma, Washington to immigrant parents from Samoa. He attended Henry Foss High School, where he was a three-year letterman at defensive end and linebacker, but also played some tight end. He was named the Narrows League Defensive MVP after collecting 78 solo tackles as a senior. He was also named to the Washington 4A First Team All-State, and was the Tacoma Weekly Player of the Year.

Crichton also competed in track & field at Henry Foss. As a senior in 2009, he posted personal-best throws of 13.39 meters (43 feet, 10 inches) in the shot put and 37.61 meters (123 feet, 4 inches) in the discus. In addition, he was also timed at 4.6 seconds in the 40-yard dash.

Considered a three-star recruit by Rivals.com, Crichton was rated as the 44th best defensive end prospect in the nation and the 12th best player in the state of Washington. He committed to Oregon State on January 16, 2010. He also had a scholarship offer from Washington State.

== College career ==
As a freshman in 2010, Crichton redshirted but earned defensive scout team Co-MVP. In 2011, he had a sensational season as a redshirt-freshman after finishing the season with 74 tackles including 14.5 tackles for loss, tops in the nation among freshmen, a team-leading six sacks and six forced fumbles. He was named to the College Football News Freshman All-American team. He continued where he left off, recording 44 total and setting career highs in tackles for loss (17.5) and sacks (9), on his way to being named a first team All-Pac-12 Conference selection. In 2013, he finished his season with 47 tackles, including 19 for a loss, 7.5 sacks and three forced fumbles, earning second team all conference honors.

On January 4, 2014, he announced he would forgo his senior season and enter the 2014 NFL draft.

=== Statistics ===
Year	Team	Games	Tackles				Sacks	Pass defense				Fumbles		Blkd	
Year	Team	Games	Solo	Ast	Total	TFL – Yds	No – Yds	Int – Yds	BU	PD	Qbh	Rcv – Yds	FF	Kick	Saf
2011	Oregon State	12	48	26	74	14.5 – 63	6.0 – 33	0 – 0	3	3	0	1 – 0	6	1	0
2012	Oregon State	13	23	21	44	17.5 – 76	9.0 – 49	0 – 0	3	3	1	2 – 0	1	1	0
2013	Oregon State	13	29	18	47	19.0 – 85	7.5 – 48	0 – 0	3	3	1	1 – 36	3	0	0
Career		38	100	65	165	51.0 – 224	22.5 – 130	0 – 0	9	9	2	4 – 36	10	2	0

== Professional career ==
=== Pre-draft ===
Rated as one of the best prospects at his position (defensive end), Crichton was projected as a second-round draft choice by CBSSports.com.

Pre-draft measurables
Height	Weight	Arm length	Hand span	40-yard dash	10-yard split	20-yard split	20-yard shuttle	Three-cone drill	Vertical jump	Broad jump	Bench press
6 ft 3 in (1.91 m)	273 lb (124 kg)	32 3/4 in (0.83 m)	10 1/8 in (0.26 m)	4.78 s	1.64 s	2.63 s	4.29 s	7.19 s	31 1/2 in (0.80 m)	9 ft 0 in (2.74 m)	24 reps
All values from NFL Combine

=== Minnesota Vikings ===
Crichton was selected by the Minnesota Vikings with the 8th pick in the 3rd round (72nd overall) of the 2014 NFL draft. In the 2014 season, he played in 8 games with 0 starts. On December 10, 2015, he suffered a concussion in the Vikings' loss to the Arizona Cardinals. On December 19, 2015, Crichton was placed on injured reserve. Before his 2015 season prematurely ended, he played in 13 games with 0 starts.

On August 31, 2016, Crichton was placed on injured reserve after clearing waivers.

On March 24, 2017, he was released by the Vikings.

=== Buffalo Bills ===
On March 27, 2017, Crichton was claimed off waivers by the Buffalo Bills. Two days later, he was waived by the Bills after failing a physical.
