= Highbush =

Highbush is an adjective for various types of berries:

- Highbush blueberries (Blueberry § Highbush)
- Highbush cranberries (Highbush cranberry)
- Smooth highbush blackberry (Rubus canadensis)
