= Bonhoeffer (surname) =

Bonhoeffer is a surname. Notable people with the surname include:

- Dietrich Bonhoeffer (1906–1945), German pastor, theologian, spy, anti-Nazi dissident
- Karl Bonhoeffer (1868–1948), German neuroscientist and physician
- Klaus Bonhoeffer (1901–1945), German jurist and resistance fighter
- Emmi Bonhoeffer (1905–1991), wife of anti-Hitler activist Klaus Bonhoeffer
- Tobias Bonhoeffer (born 1960), German neurobiologist

== See also ==
- Bonhoeffer family, a German family
- Bonhoeffer Botanical Gardens
- Bonhoeffer-van der Pol model named after Karl Friedrich Bonhoeffer and Balthasar van der Pol. Now known as FitzHugh–Nagumo model
