= Northwest Trek =

American wildlife park

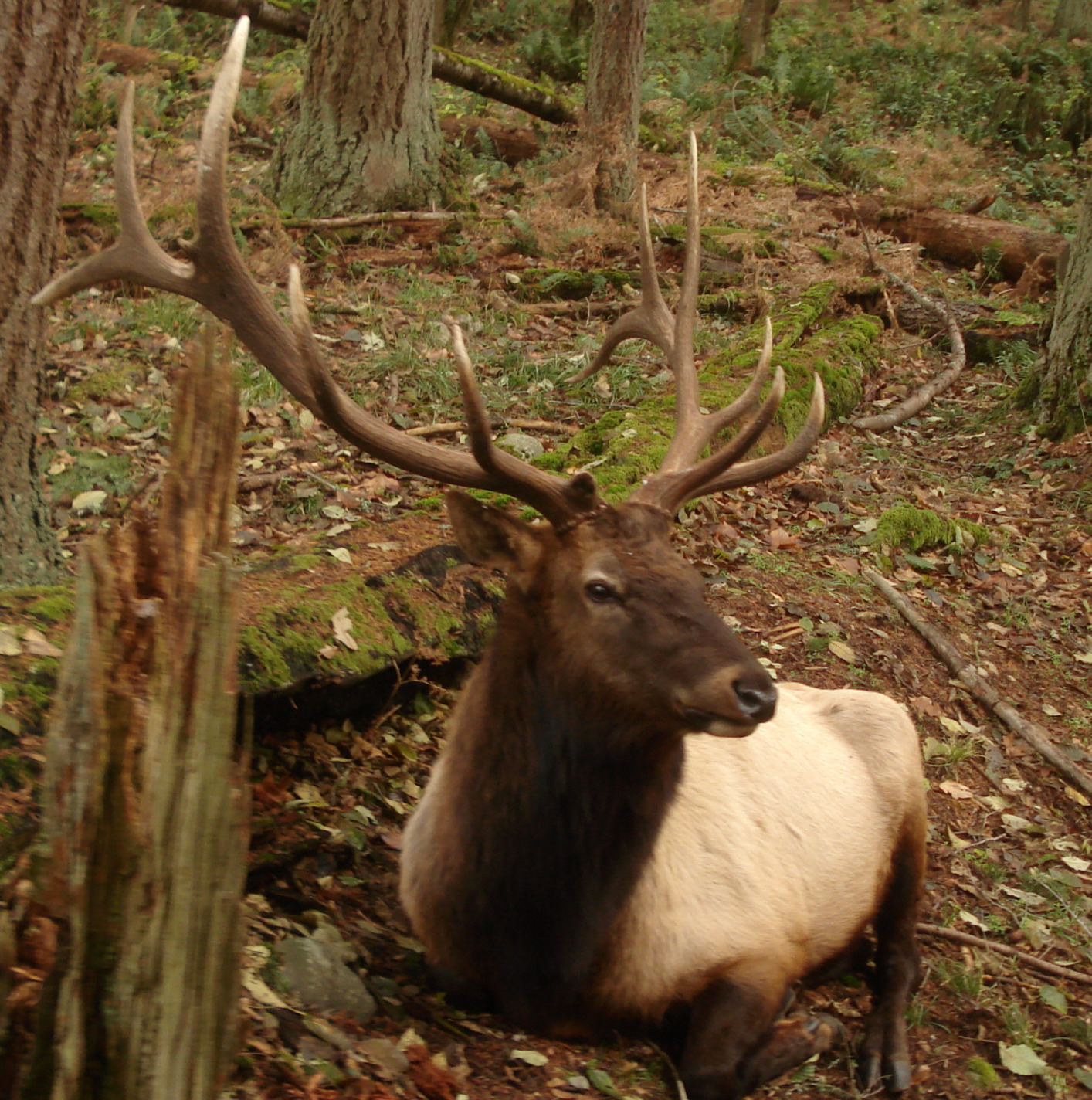
- Male (bull) Roosevelt elk as seen on Tram Tour
- Interactive map of Northwest Trek
- 46.9161515°N 122.2718239°W
- Date opened: 1975
- Location: Eatonville, Washington, United States
- Land area: 723 acres (293 ha)
- No. of animals: 200+
- No. of species: about 38
- Memberships: AZA
- Major exhibits: Free-Roaming Area
- Website: www.nwtrek.org

Northwest Trek Wildlife Park is a 723-acre (293 ha) wildlife park located near the town of Eatonville, Washington, United States. The park is home to black and grizzly bears, grey wolves, bald eagles, cougars, wolverines, bobcats and more. Its primary feature is a tram tour which takes visitors through a 435-acre (176 ha) free-roam area. The park also allows guests to drive their own vehicles past bison, mountain goats, Roosevelt elk, deer, caribou, swans and more on a Wild Drive tour. Guests can also take a premier Keeper Adventure Tour and go off-road in a Jeep with a keeper and up close to wildlife.

Northwest Trek Wildlife Park is accredited by the Association of Zoos and Aquariums (AZA). The park and its companion zoo, Point Defiance Zoo & Aquarium in Tacoma, are both owned and operated by Metro Parks Tacoma.

== History ==
In 1971, founders David and Connie Hellyer donated their vacation property near Eatonville to Metro Parks Tacoma to be set aside as a wildlife preserve. The park opened in 1975. Several bond issues have been passed over the years to help pay for improvements at the park. Facilities added over the years include the Snowy Owl Exhibit (1982), Great Horned Owl Exhibit (1985), Cat Country Exhibit (1987), Barn Owl Exhibit (1988), the Cheney Discovery Center for children (1989), Wolf Exhibit (1992), Grizzly and Black Bear Exhibit (1993), Picnic Pavilion (1995), and the Coyote/Red Fox Exhibit (2003).

In 2000, voters passed a sales tax increase that provides a steady income for the Point Defiance Zoo, Trek and other Pierce County parks and supplies about half of the park's income. The park also opened the Hellyer Natural History Center, a laboratory/classroom that can be used by students, scientists, and others in the community.

In 2005, an additional 100 acres (40 ha) along the northern border of the park was purchased to help protect the tram route from residential development and provide additional space for research and conservation programs. Then in 2007, an additional 7-acre (2.8 ha) bridge of land was acquired, increasing the size of the park to 722.89 acres (292.54 ha).

== Features ==
The park is divided into three areas: the Tram Tour area, the Walking Tour area, and the Nature Trails area.

=== Free-Roaming Area Tours ===
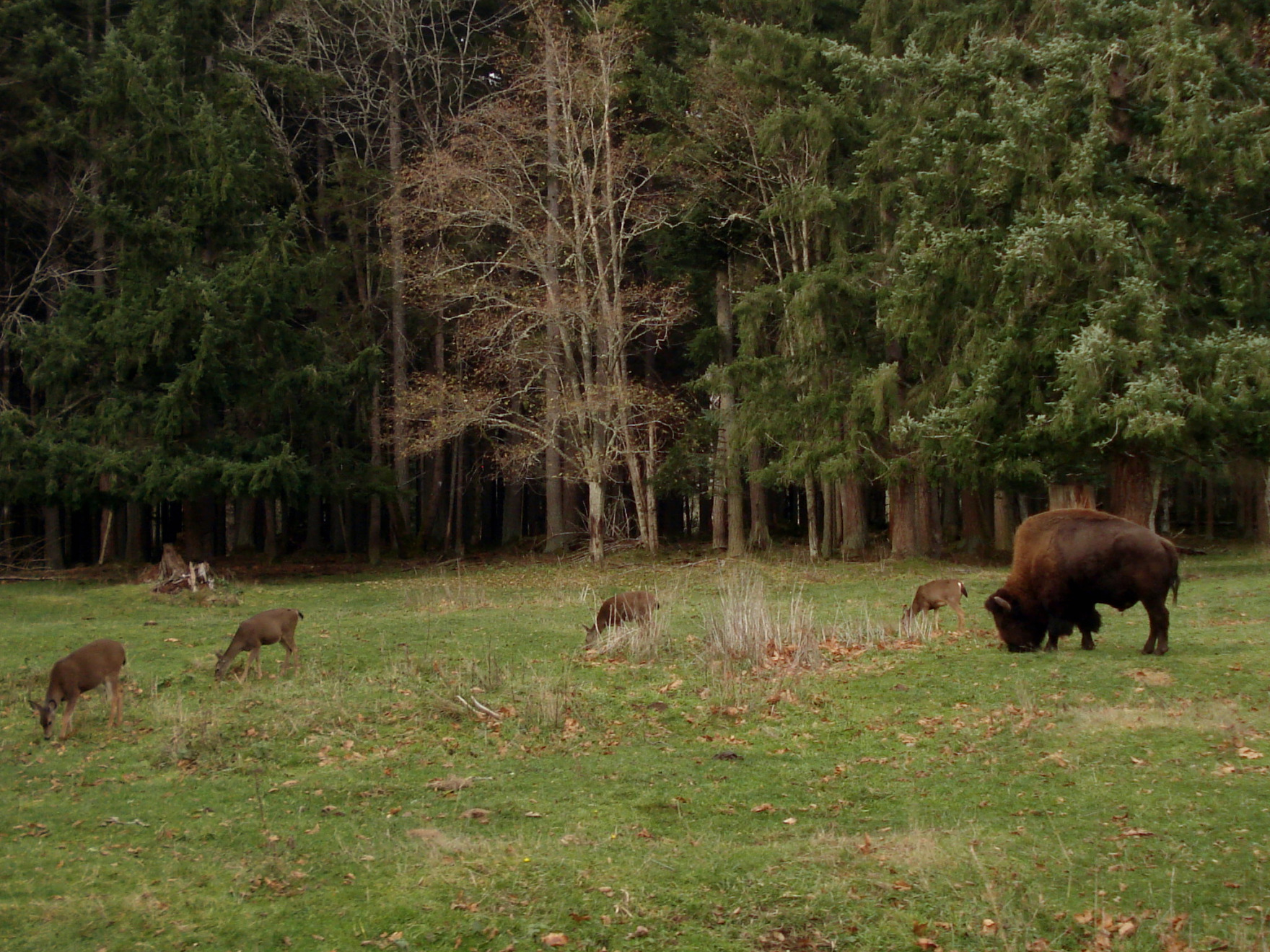
Bison grazing with black-tailed deer at Northwest Trek.

The Free-Roaming Area is the park's main feature. Visitors can ride on the park's new electric trams, which are included with admission. These trams replaced 5 propane trams, 3 of which were introduced in 1975, and 2 in 1998. Visitors can also pay an additional fee to take a self-drive Wild Drive tour or hop in the off-road Keeper Adventure Tour Jeep through the 435-acre (176 ha) free-range area. Animals that can be seen include: moose, mountain goat, Roosevelt elk, American bison, caribou, Black-tailed deer, bighorn sheep, and trumpeter swan.

=== Walking paths ===
The walking path area is where visitors can see animals in enclosed spaces much like at a conventional zoo. The area has two "learning centers" featuring hands-on activities for children, as well as services for visitors including a cafeteria and a gift shop. Bordering the tour pathway, one can see and enjoy a great variety of native plant life, some of which is labeled for easy identification.

Animal species that can be seen on the walking tour include: the western toad, banana slug (seasonal), rough-skinned newt, bald eagle, golden eagle, snowy owl, barn owl, bobcat, Canada lynx, North American cougar, red fox, Northwestern wolf, grizzly bear, black bear, marten, badger, skunk, wolverine, raccoon, river otter, and North American beaver.

=== Nature trails ===
Northwest Trek has 5 miles (8.0 km) of nature trails that visitors can walk.

=== Kids Trek Playground ===
The Kids Trek Playground is at the front of the park, near the main entrance and dining area. The playground is themed like a forest landscape. Its centerpiece is a fake 20-foot (6.1 m) tall hollow tree stump you can climb inside to access the upper level of the playground. In addition, there are rope nets and ladders connecting different areas, tunnels where small ones can crawl and explore, and several slides.

== Learning centers ==
The walking tour has two learning centers: the Cheney Family Discovery Center and the Baker Research Cabin. Both feature animals and hands-on activities for children.

=== Cheney Family Discovery Center ===
Cheney Family Discovery Center is located close to the tram boarding station. At the Cheney Family Discovery Center visitors can touch several fur pelts of Pacific Northwest animals, participate in children's crafts, and view several animals.

Animal species that can be seen in Cheney Family Discovery Center include rough-skinned newt, Pacific tree frog, spadefoot toad, western toad, and garter snake.

=== Baker Research Cabin ===
The Baker Research Cabin is located in between the gray wolves and the red foxes. In Baker Research Cabin visitors can see wolves and view red foxes by remotely controlled cameras.

== See also ==
- Point Defiance Zoo & Aquarium
- Woodland Park Zoo
