= Metropolitan Park District =

Metropolitan Park District may refer to:

- Metropolitan Park System of Greater Boston
- Metro Parks Tacoma
- Metro Parks (Columbus, Ohio)
- Metroparks of the Toledo Area
