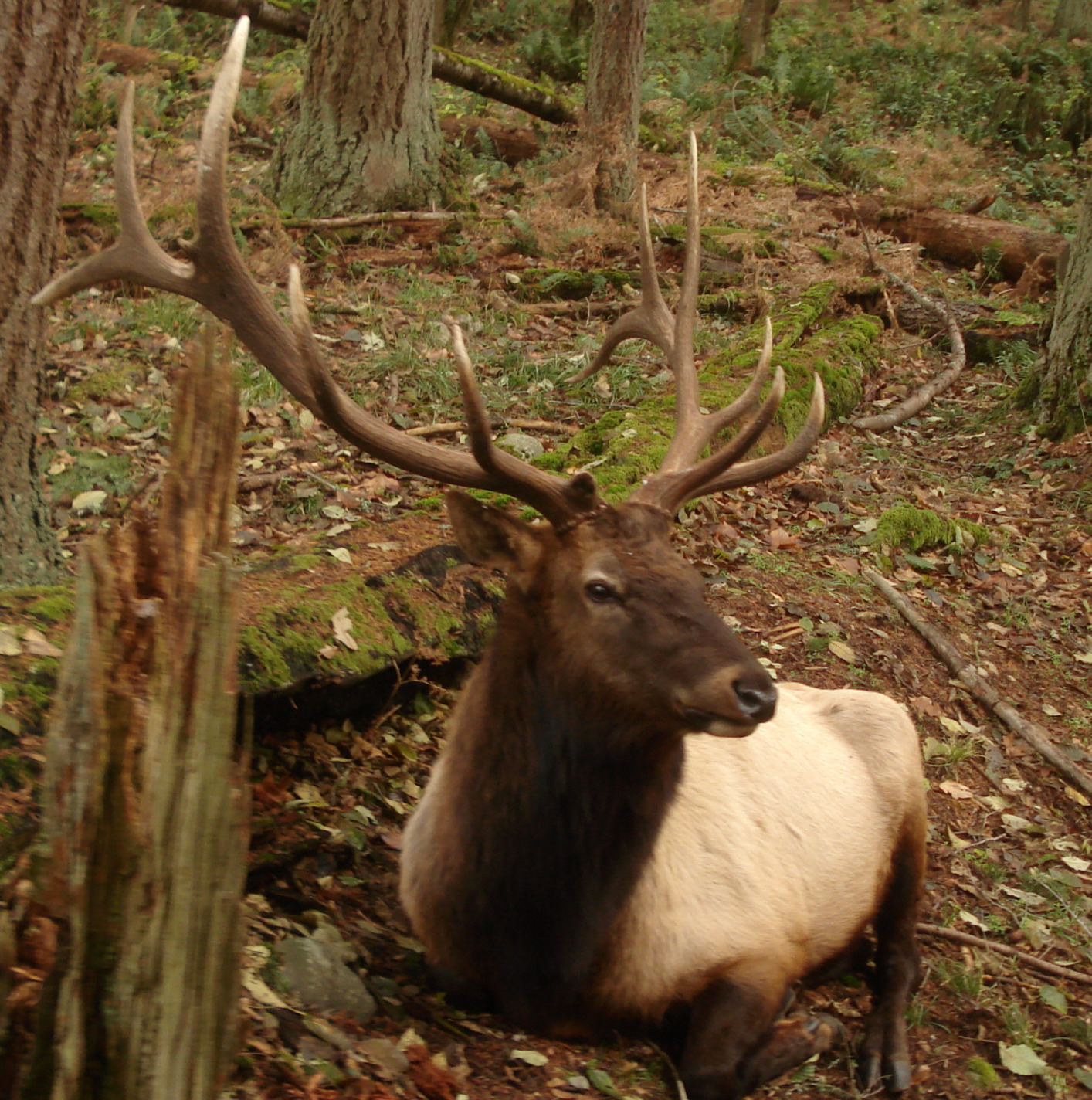
- Male (bull) at Northwest Trek, Washington, US
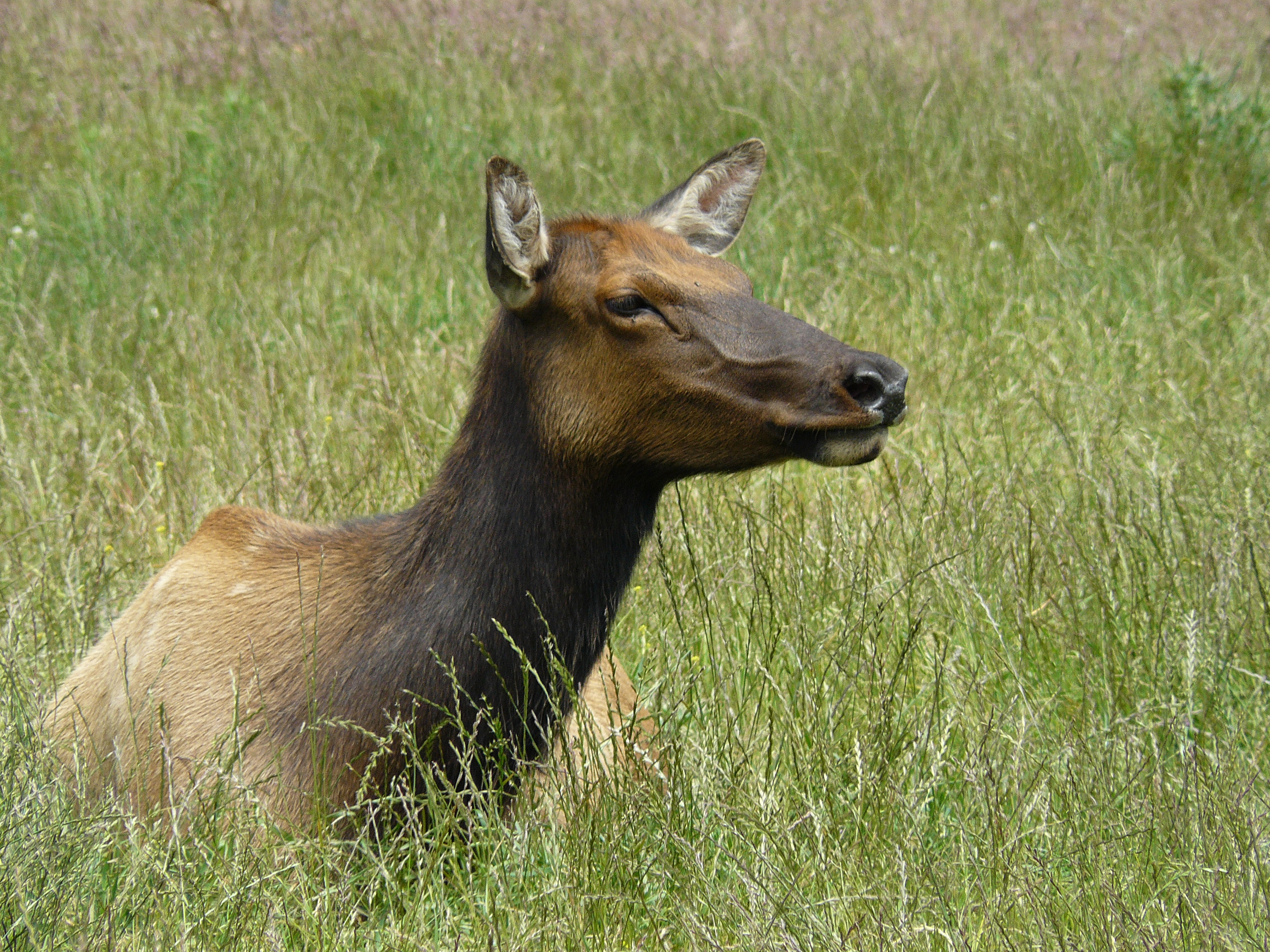
- Female (cow) at Prairie Creek Redwoods State Park, California, US

Conservation status
- Apparently Secure (NatureServe)

Scientific classification
- Kingdom: Animalia
- Phylum: Chordata
- Class: Mammalia
- Order: Artiodactyla
- Family: Cervidae
- Genus: Cervus
- Species: C. canadensis
- Subspecies: C. c. roosevelti

Trinomial name
- Cervus canadensis roosevelti Merriam, 1897

Synonyms
- Cervus elaphus roosevelti

= Roosevelt elk =

Roosevelt Elk

Subspecies of large North American mammal

The Roosevelt elk (Cervus canadensis roosevelti), also known commonly as the Olympic elk and Roosevelt's wapiti, is the largest of the four surviving subspecies of elk (Cervus canadensis) in North America by body mass. Mature bulls weigh from 700 to 1,200 lb (320 to 540 kg), with very rare large bulls weighing more. Its geographic range includes temperate rainforests of the Pacific Northwest including parts of northern California. It was introduced to Alaska's Afognak, Kodiak, and Raspberry Islands in 1928 and reintroduced to British Columbia's Sunshine Coast from Vancouver Island in 1986.

== Naming and protection ==
In December 1897, mammalogist C. Hart Merriam named the subspecies after his friend Theodore Roosevelt, then Assistant Secretary of the US Navy. The desire to protect the Roosevelt elk was one of the primary forces behind the establishment of the Mount Olympus National Monument in 1909 by President Theodore Roosevelt. Later in 1937, President Franklin D. Roosevelt visited the region and saw the elk named after his relative. The following year he created Olympic National Park.

== Description ==
The Roosevelt elk grows to around 6–10 ft (180–300 cm) in length and stand 2.5–5.6 ft (76–171 cm) tall at the withers. Roosevelt elk bulls generally weigh between 700 and 1,100 pounds (320 and 500 kg), while cows weigh 575–625 lb (261–283 kg). Some mature bulls from Raspberry Island in Alaska have weighed nearly 1,300 lb (590 kg).

Although the largest elk subspecies by body mass, by antler size both the Boone and Crockett (rifle) and Pope and Young (bow) records have Rocky Mountain elk being larger; none of the top 10 Roosevelt elk would score in the top 20 of Pope and Young's Rocky Mountain elk.

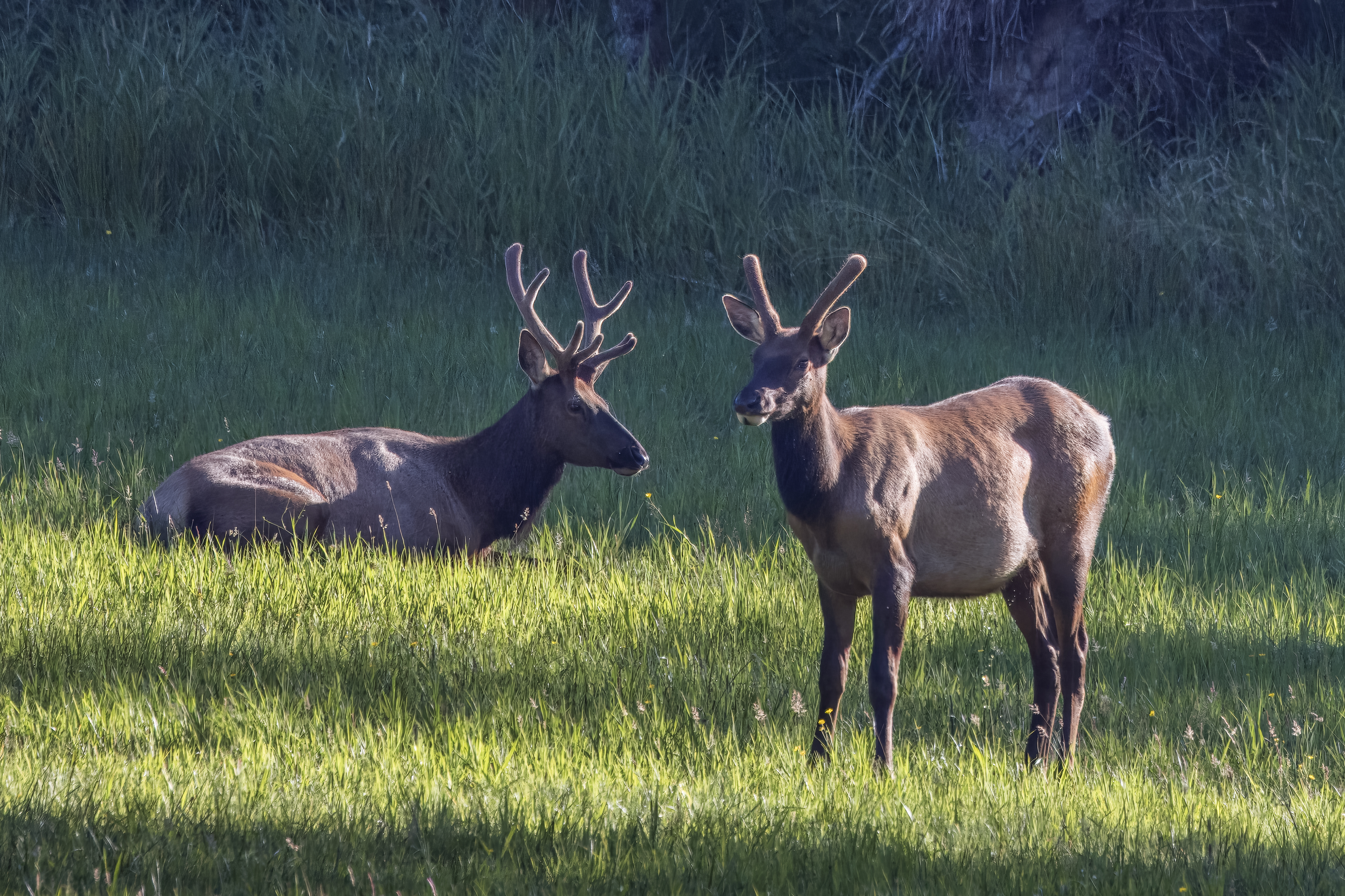
males, with antlers in velvet

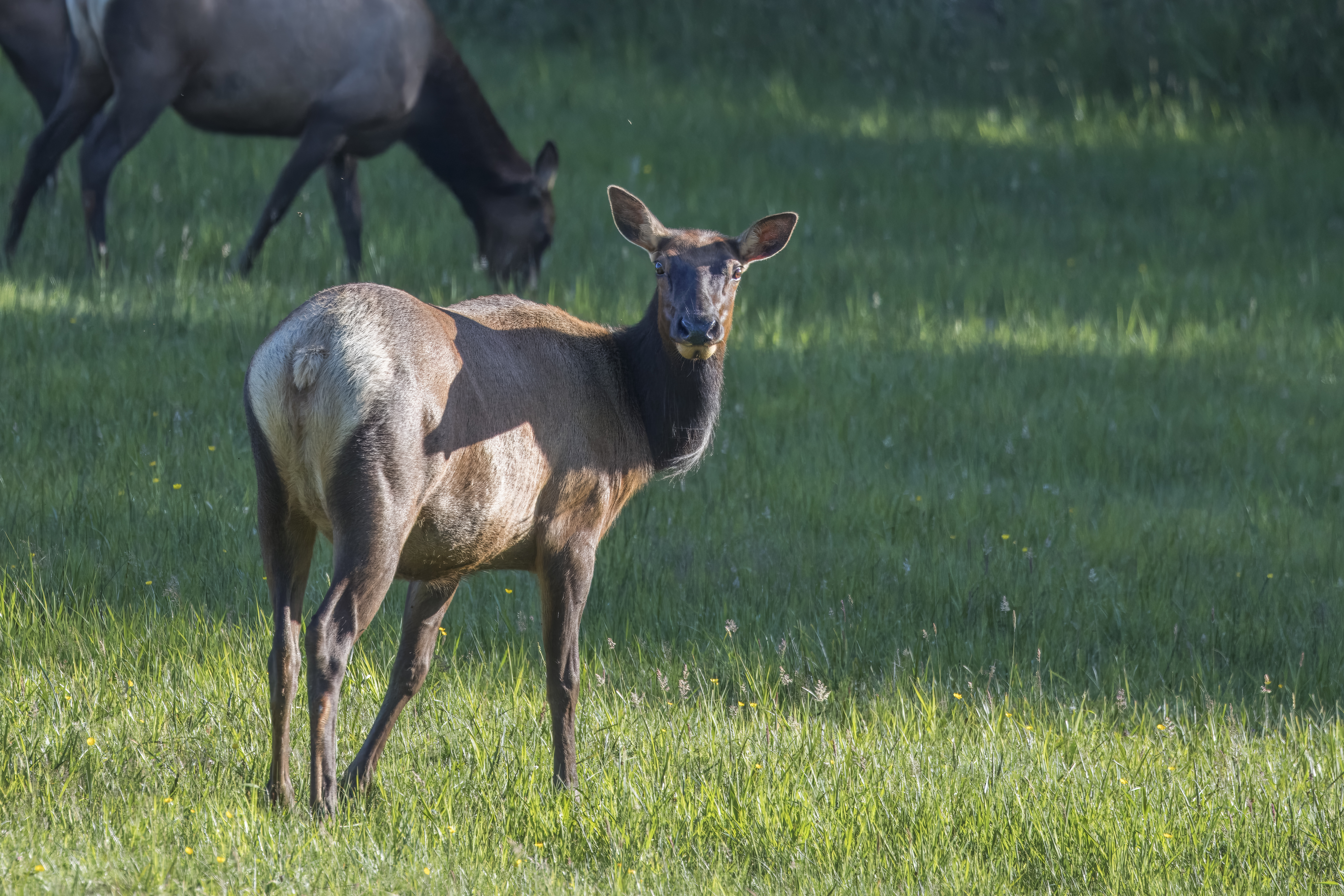
female

== Diet ==
From late spring to early fall, the Roosevelt elk feeds upon herbaceous plants, such as grasses and sedges. During winter months, it feeds on woody plants, including highbush cranberry, elderberry, devil's club, and newly planted seedlings (Douglas fir and western redcedar). The Roosevelt elk is also known to eat ferns, blueberries, mushrooms, lichens, and salmonberries.

== Reintroduction ==
This elk subspecies, Cervus canadensis roosevelti, was reintroduced to British Columbia's Sunshine Coast from Vancouver Island in 1986.

== Predators and threats ==
Although the Roosevelt Elk is one of the largest for its species, it has many predators that are dominant above it in the food web. The most prominent species that the elk fall prey to include grizzly bears, grey wolves (Canis lupus), mountain lions (Puma concolor), and black bears (Ursus americanus).

== Reproduction and life cycle ==
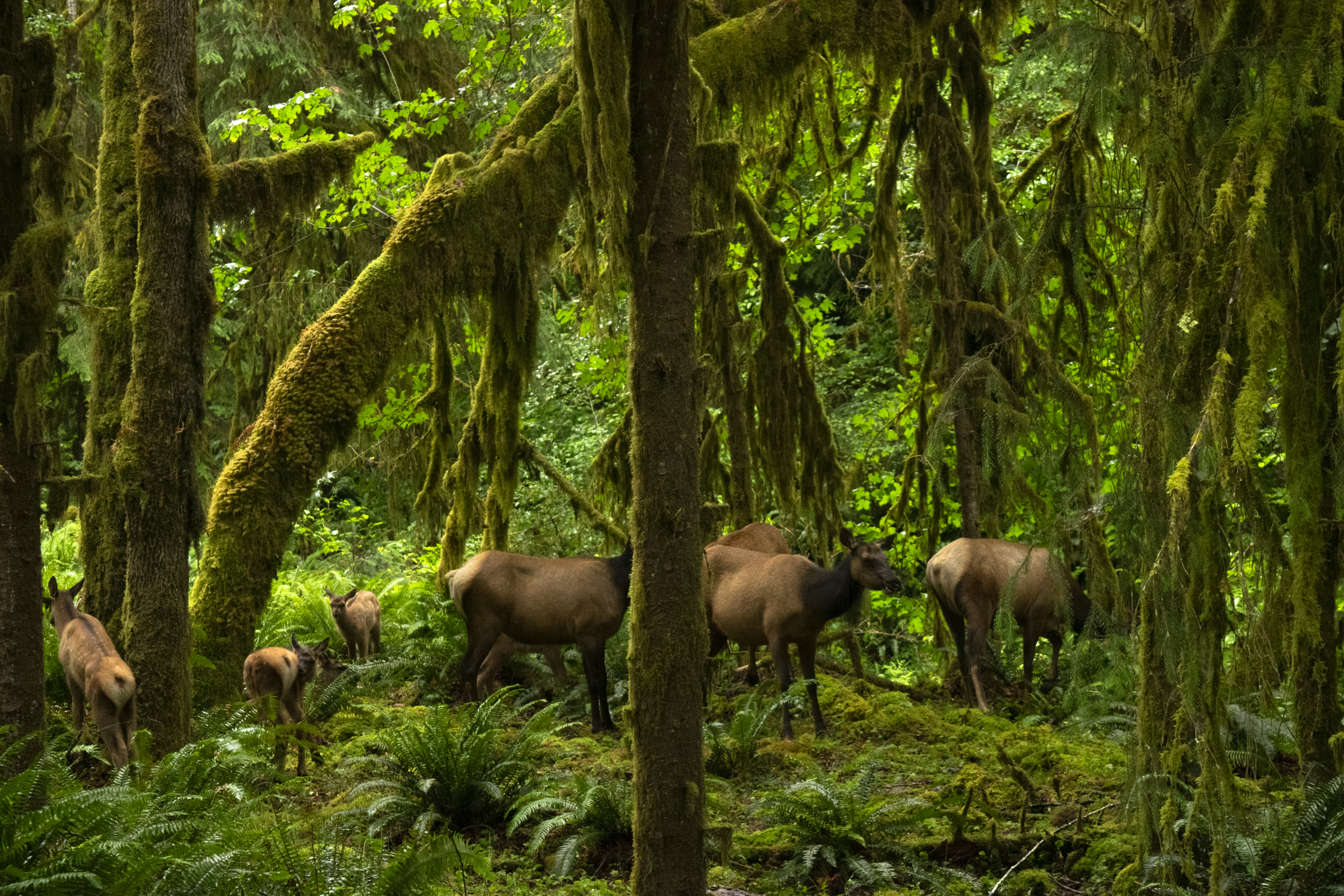
A herd grazing

The Roosevelt Elk have different names and purposes when it comes to their gender and what stage they are at in life. Males are called bulls and the females are called cows, while all offspring are called calves. Only until calves reach maturity of about 2 years of age is when they are fully identified as either a bull or cow. During Elk rut, the mating season of the species in the late summer and early fall, bulls attempt to outcompete each other to gain dominance among a small group of cows. While physical dominance over each other through aggression and fighting can be used, bulls commonly use the stature of their antlers, necks, and bodies to establish dominance. Since they are a large species, the elk often only reproduce a single calf once a year in the spring. Before the calf joins the herd, they stay camouflaged with spots gained from birth during the first few weeks to avoid predators until they are strong enough to forage and protect one another. The Roosevelt Elk can live up to approximately 15 years in the wild, but can reach up to 25 years under human care. In 2018, the New York State Zoo had a Roosevelt elk named Rosie die in August of that year at the age of 26, which means it was one of the oldest at that time.

== See also ==
- Dean Creek Elk Viewing Area
- Manitoban elk
- Rocky Mountain elk
- Tule elk
