= New York zoo =

There are several New York zoos.

In New York City:

- The Bronx Zoo, the city's main zoo
- The Central Park Zoo, Manhattan
- The Queens Zoo (Flushing Meadow Zoo)
- The Prospect Park Zoo, Brooklyn
- The Staten Island Zoo, the North Shore, Staten Island

In New York State:

- The Buffalo Zoo in the city of Buffalo
- Zoo New York in Thompson Park, in Watertown, Jefferson County
