= ZooLights =

ZooLights is a commonly used term for holiday lighting festivals held in zoos during the winter months, including:

- Zoolights at Wilder Institute/Calgary Zoo
- Zoo Lights at Dallas Zoo
- Zoo Lights at Houston Zoo; see TXU Energy § Houston Zoo
- ZooLights at Lincoln Park Zoo in Chicago, Illinois
- ZooLights at the U.S. National Zoo, Washington, D.C.
- ZooLights at Phoenix Zoo
- Zoolights at Point Defiance Zoo & Aquarium in Tacoma, Washington
- LA Zoo Lights at Los Angeles Zoo and Botanical Gardens
