= South Seattle College Arboretum =

Arboretum and botanical garden in Seattle, Washington

Coordinates: 47°33′05″N 122°21′13″W

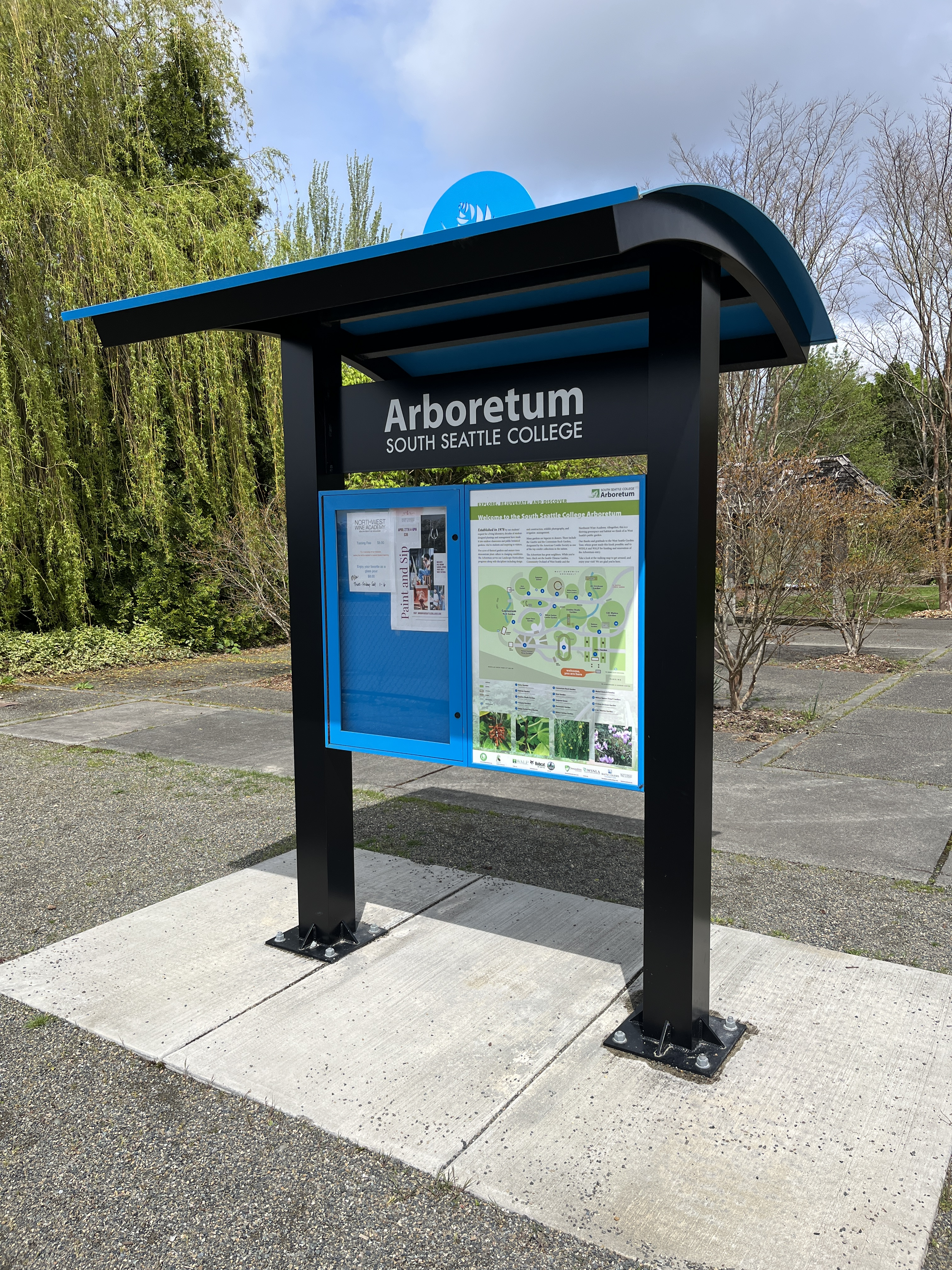
- Interactive map of South Seattle College Arboretum
- Type: Botanical garden
- Location: Seattle, Washington, United States
- Website: southseattle.edu/campus-arboretum

The South Seattle College Arboretum (formerly South Seattle Community College Arboretum, renamed with the college in March 2014) is a 6-acre (24,000 m^{2}) arboretum and botanical garden located at the north end of the South Seattle College campus in Seattle, Washington. It is open daily without charge. The Seattle Chinese Garden is adjacent.

The arboretum was established in 1978. As of 2006, its collections include:

- Acer Garden – 40 varieties of maples with an emphasis on Asiatic species.
- Coenosium Rock Garden – one of the largest collections of dwarf conifers on the West Coast.
- Mert & Beth Dawley Fern Garden – 20 types of ferns and a variety of companion plants.
- Mabel Davis Memorial Garden – with a fine view of Elliott Bay and the Seattle skyline.
- Entry Garden – a formal display of ornamental grasses, herbaceous perennials, bulbs, and annuals.
- H. C. Erickson Garden – heather and birch trees.
- Anna C. Mason Garden – an old-fashioned perennial garden.
- Charles and Clark Malmo Rhododendron Garden – rhododendron species and hybrids with native companion plants.
- Sequoia Grove – specimens of giant sequoia, coast redwood, and dawn redwood.
- Helen Sutton Rose Garden – a classical rose garden, with more than 100 varieties of hybrid tea, floribunda, grandifloras, and English roses.
- Milton Sutton Dwarf Conifer Garden – a collection of conifer species and cultivars.

== See also ==
- List of botanical gardens in the United States
