= Titlow Beach =

Park in Tacoma, Washington, US

Coordinates: 47.247°N 122.553°W

Titlow Beach is in Tacoma, Washington, USA. It is located along Puget Sound near the Tacoma Narrows Bridge. It has a beach, community center, park, water play area (all of which are run by Metro Parks Tacoma), one restaurant, a view of the Tacoma Narrows Bridge, a small boardwalk, and is a popular scuba diving area.

== History ==
Local lawyer Aaron R. Titlow purchased the property in 1903 and in 1911 built the 3 1/2 story Swiss Chalet-style Hotel Hesperides, a resort hotel that lasted until 1923. In 1926, the hotel was acquired by the park district. During the 1930s, a renovation by the WPA project removed one and one-half stories of the lodge. The lodge served as the home of the assistant superintendent for parks and then the caretaker for the park until 1990. It was remodeled in 2011, and the pool was replaced in 2013 with a water play area.

From June 3, 1928 until 1950 a ferry service ran between Titlow Beach, Pt Fosdick and Fox Island. Ferry service was interrupted in July 1940 with the completion of the first Tacoma Narrows Bridge, and resumed November 8, 1940 with the collapse of the bridge.

In 1963, octopus wrestling championships were held at the beach.

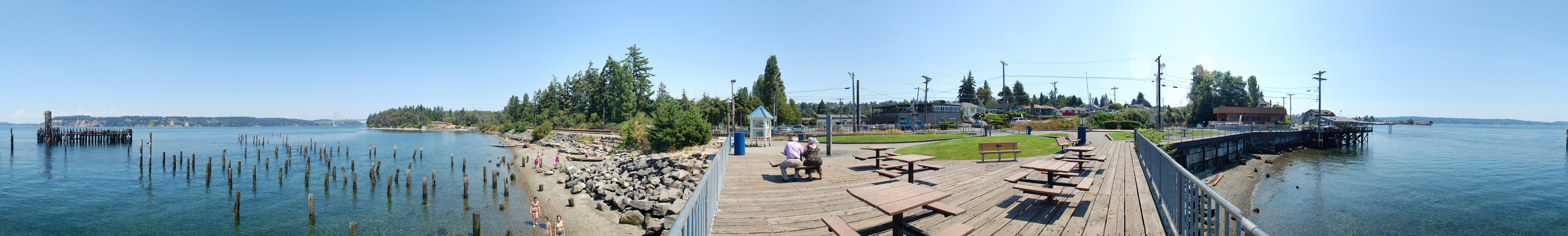
360° panorama of Titlow Beach Park. This photograph features the Titlow Beach, ruins of an old ferry terminal, and the Tacoma Narrows Bridges.
