= Thompson Park (Watertown, New York) =

Park in Watertown, New York

Coordinates: 43°57′48.5″N 75°53′16.6″W

- John C. Thompson Park
- Interactive map of Thompson Park
- Type: Park
- Location: Watertown, New York
- Elevation: ~725 ft (220m)
- Created: 1899
- Established: 1900
- Designated: 1916
- Designer: John C. Olmsted
- Owner: United States Government
- Website: www.zoonewyork.org
- (Zoo's Website)

Thompson Park is an urban park designed by John Charles Olmsted (The nephew and adopted son of Frederick Law Olmsted, who designed Central Park) located in Watertown, New York. It was donated to the city by industrialist John C. Thompson in 1916.

The park features a zoo and a 18-hole golf club as well as a monument to soldiers of the 10th Mountain Division. The monument was designed, built and unveiled on July 1, 2016, by the North Country community.

== History ==
Thompson Park was donated to Watertown, New York in 1916. A playground began construction in November 2016 which was completed on May 23, 2017, with the ribbon cutting ceremony being held on June 5, 2017. The park & Zoo was closed down due to COVID-19 on March 19, 2020, and was reopened again on June 27, 2020.

== Zoo ==
The park is the location of "Zoo New York", a zoo located North-West of the Parks entrance. It was founded in 1920, and contains animals mostly native to Northern New York, with a Roosevelt Elk, a Bobcat, a Golden Eagle, a Canada Lynx, a Mountain Lion, a Snowy Owl, a Bald Eagle, Black Bears, Otters, etc. The Zoo also features a playground, which was unveiled on October 3, 2019.

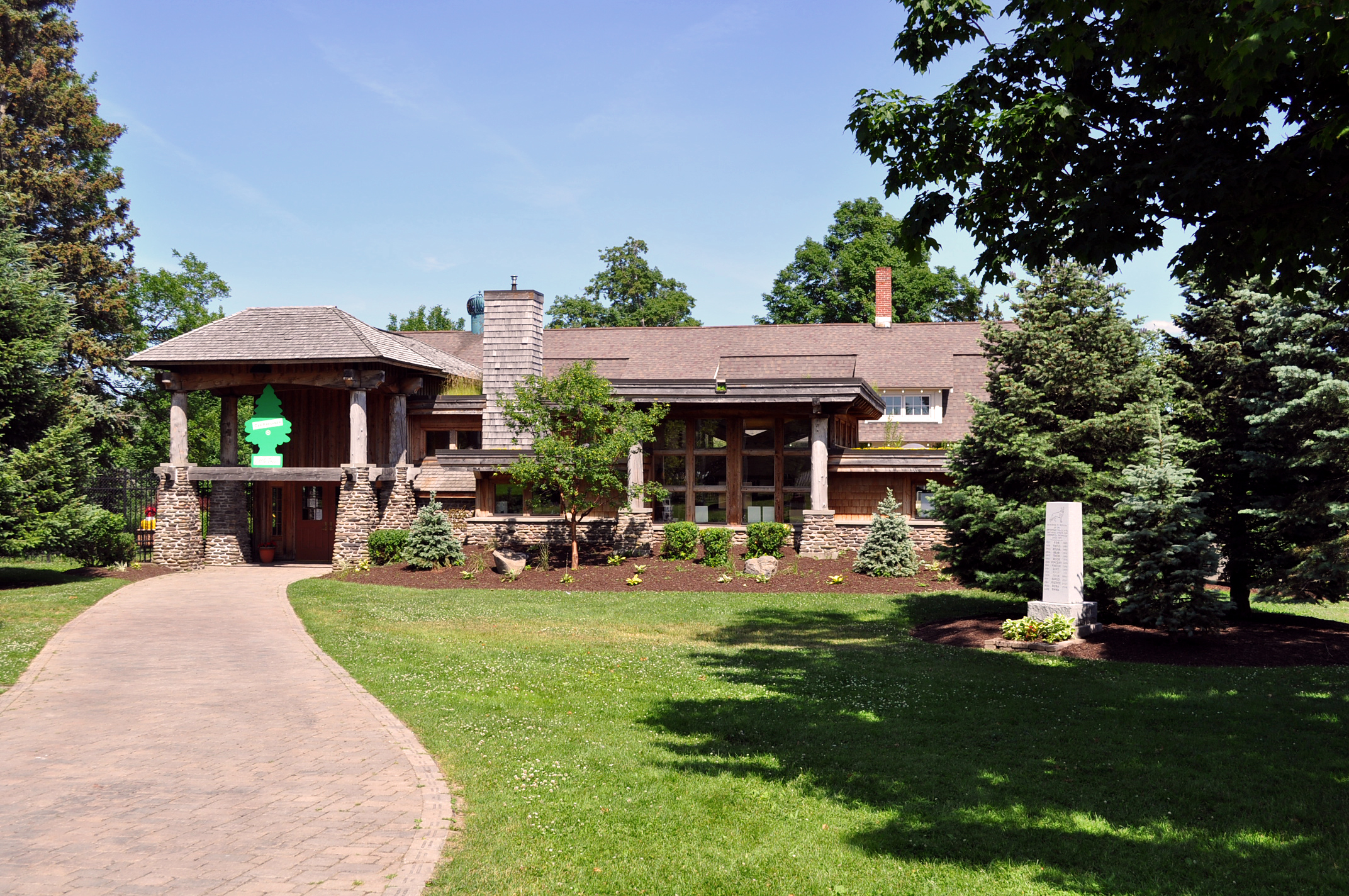
Outside view of the Visitor Center
