= South Seattle College =

Community college in Seattle, Washington, US

Coordinates: 47°32′51″N 122°21′07″W

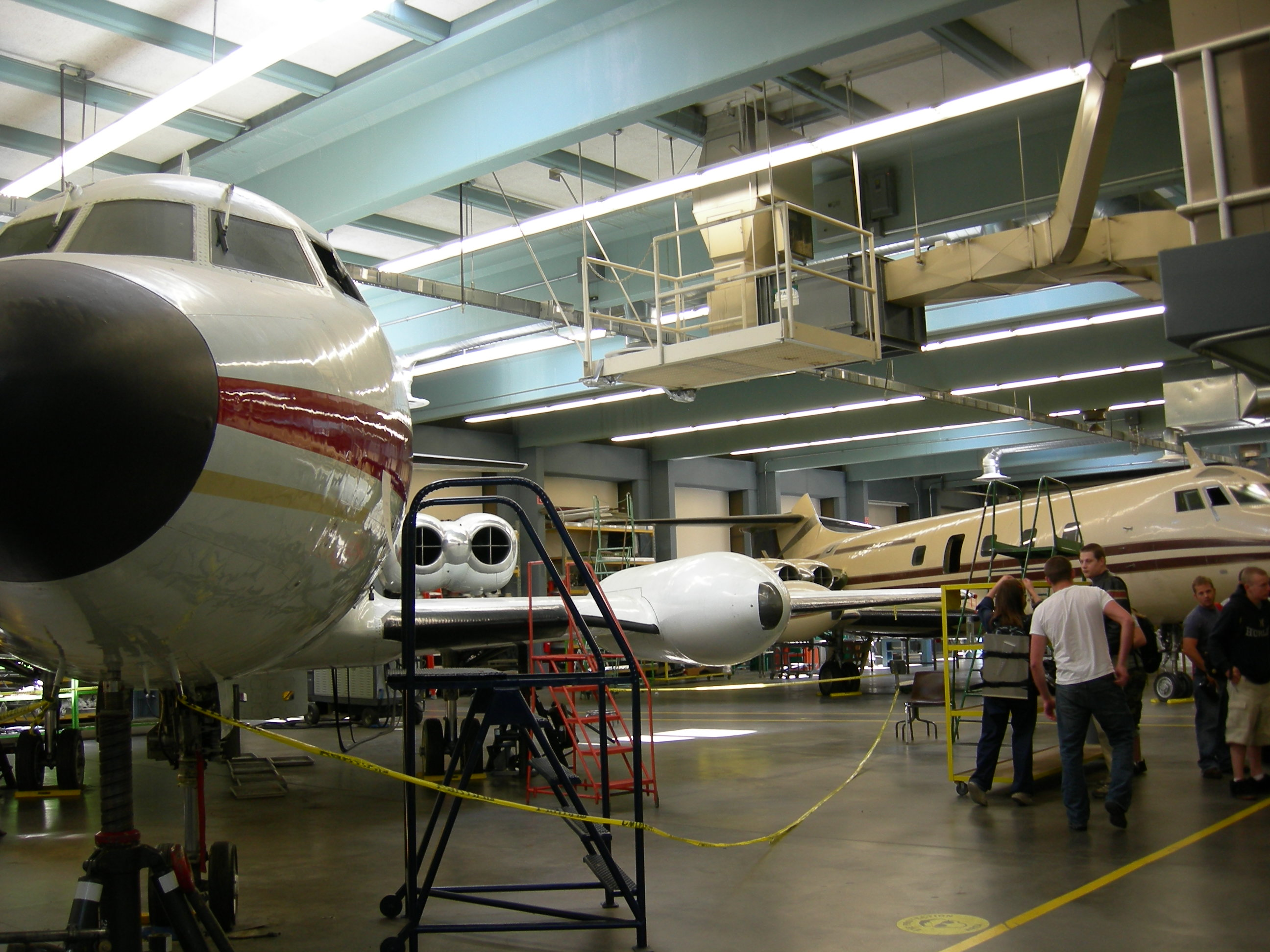
- Aircraft maintenance education at SSC
- Former name: South Seattle Community College (1970–2014)
- Type: Public
- Established: 1970
- President: Monica Brown
- Students: 6,849
- Location: Seattle, Washington, U.S.
- Website: southseattle.edu

South Seattle College (SSC, formerly South Seattle Community College) is a public community college in the Seattle neighborhoods of West Seattle and Georgetown. Founded in 1970, it is one of three colleges which make up the Seattle Colleges District. The Seattle Community Colleges District Board of Trustees voted unanimously in March 2014 to change the name of the District to Seattle Colleges and to change the names of the colleges to Seattle Central College, North Seattle College, and South Seattle College. It is home to both the South Seattle College Arboretum and Seattle Chinese Garden on the north end of their main campus. It also includes the Georgetown Campus near Boeing Field.
