= Yakima Area Arboretum =

Arboretum in Yakima, Washington, United States

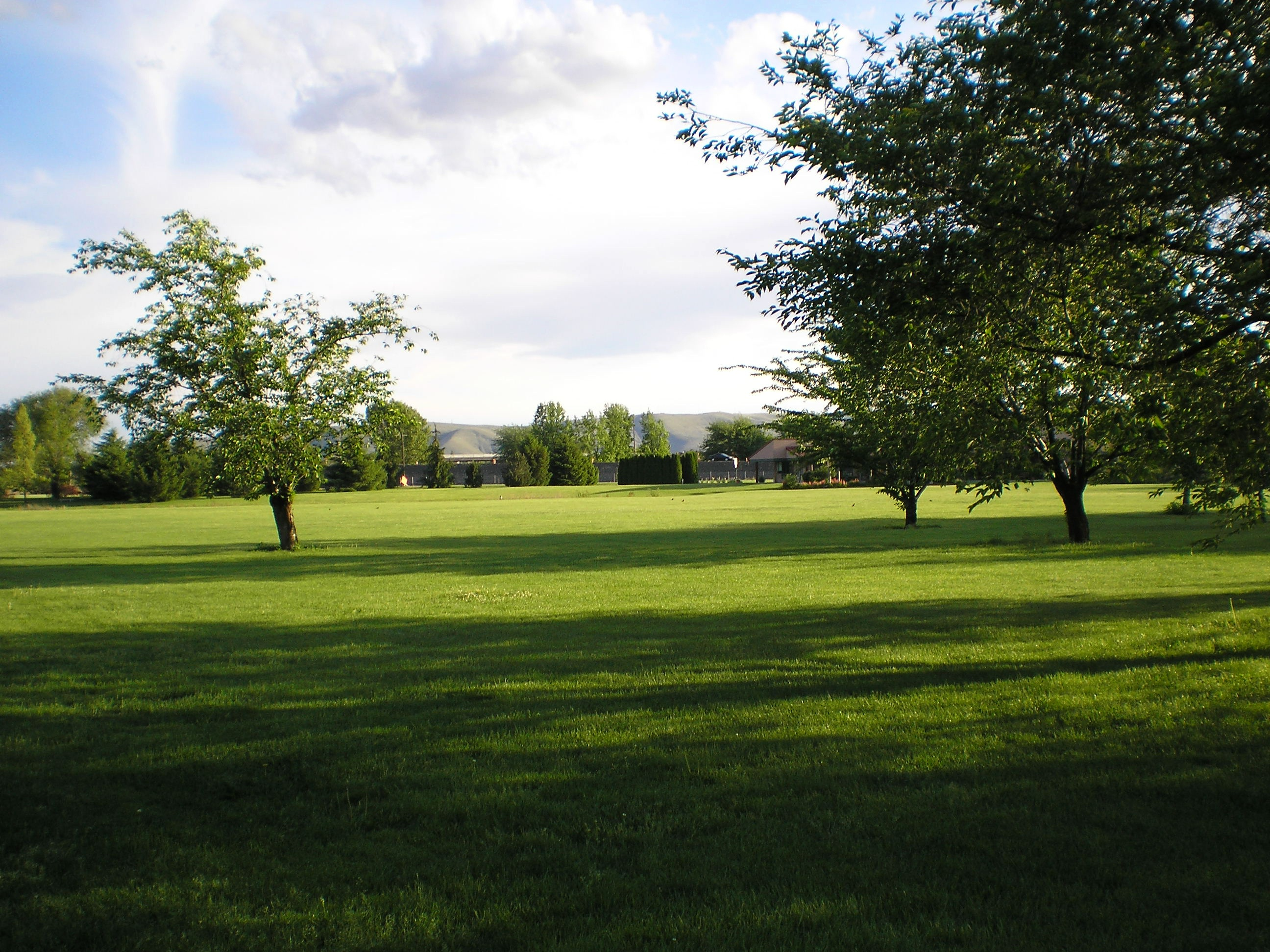
- Part of the arboretum.
- Interactive map of Yakima Area Arboretum
- Type: Arboretum
- Location: Yakima, Washington
- Coordinates: 46°35′13″N 120°28′22″W
- Area: 46 acres (19 ha)
- Species: 1,000
- Website: www.ahtrees.org

The Yakima Area Arboretum is a 46-acre (19 ha) arboretum in Yakima, Washington on a site adjoining the riparian habitat of the Yakima River.

In the 19th century, today's site was a wetland. It was later developed for chicken and vegetable farms, and eventually acquired by the Yakima Metro District. In 1967, the arboretum was established and initial work began. Development has continued ever since.

The arboretum currently includes over 1,000 native and exotic species of woody plants, as well as a herbarium and a variety of gardens (butterfly, rose, iris, Japanese, perennial, dryland, and Xeriscape.

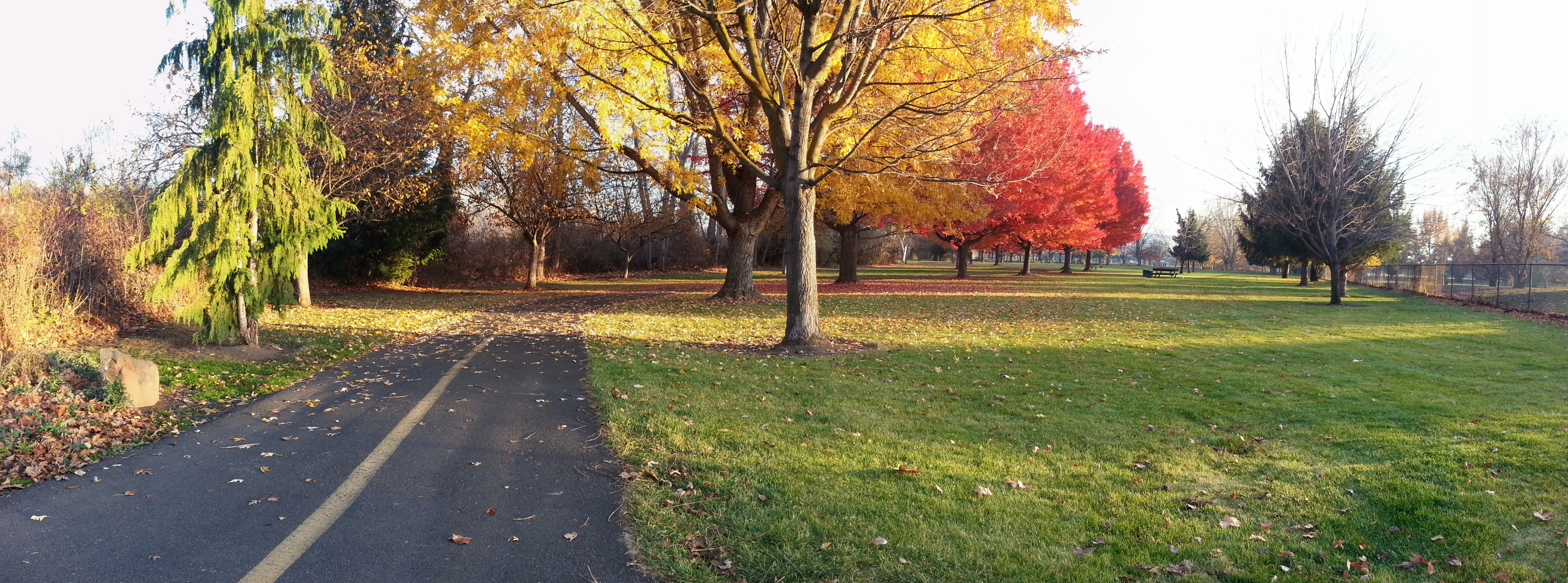
A section of the Yakima Greenway runs through the aboretum by the river.

== See also ==
- List of botanical gardens in the United States
