= Bonhoeffer Botanical Gardens =

Botanical Garden

Coordinates: 48°16′00″N 122°15′55″W

The Bonhoeffer Botanical Gardens are a botanical garden located north of Seattle. They are named in honor of Dietrich Bonhoeffer, a Lutheran pastor and scholar, who was executed in April, 1945, in Nazi Germany's Flossenburg concentration camp.

The garden contains native plants of the Pacific Northwest.
