= Point Defiance Zoo & Aquarium =

Zoo and aquarium in Tacoma, Washington, USA

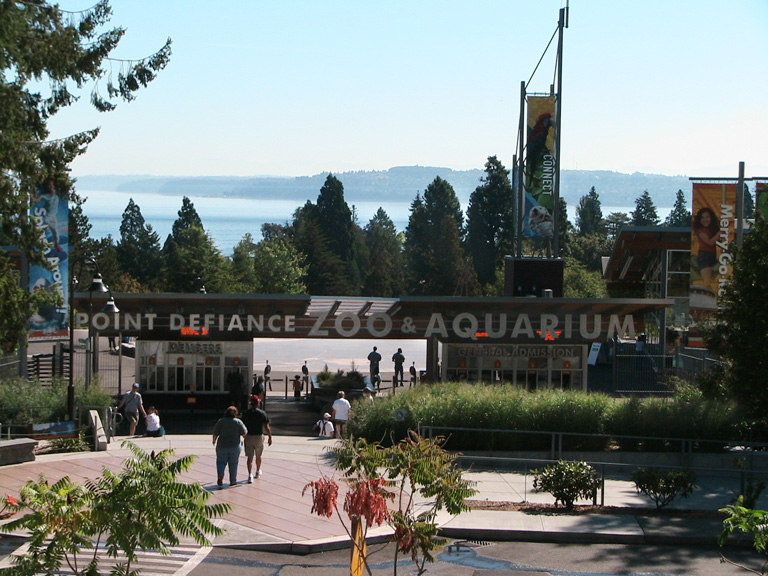
- The entrance to PDZA
- Interactive map of Point Defiance Zoo & Aquarium
- 47.3048°N 122.5207°W
- Date opened: 1905
- Location: Tacoma, Washington, US
- Land area: 27 acres (11 ha)
- Annual visitors: 732,000 (2015)
- Memberships: AZA
- Major exhibits: Kid's Zone, Arctic Tundra, Rocky Shores, Asian Forest Sanctuary, Red Wolf Woods, South Pacific Aquarium, Pacific Seas Aquarium
- Website: www.pdza.org

Point Defiance Zoo & Aquarium (PDZA) is located in Tacoma, Washington, US, and is the only combined zoo and aquarium in the Pacific Northwest. PDZA is owned by Metro Parks Tacoma. Situated on 29 acres (12 ha) in Tacoma's Point Defiance Park, the zoo and aquarium are home to over 9,000 specimens representing 367 animal species. The zoo was founded in 1905; the aquarium was founded in 1935 near Commencement Bay and relocated within the zoo in 1963. Both are accredited by the Association of Zoos and Aquariums. In Pierce County, Washington, this is said to be one of the most popular tourist destinations, bringing in over more than 600,000 visitors per year.

== History ==
The Zoo was founded in 1905, and moved closer to its current location in 1914. The Point Defiance Park Aquarium opened on the waterfront in 1936 as an entity separate from the zoo.

By the late 1940s, several Zoo buildings were in disrepair and had to be rebuilt. The 36-year-old animal house was demolished and a new one with sandstone walls and 3/4-inch-thick viewing windows was built in its place. It housed some big cats and white-cheeked gibbons.

In the 1960s, the Point Defiance Park Aquarium had been incorporated into the Zoo. A new aquarium, now known as the North Pacific Aquarium, was built on Zoo grounds in 1963. The North Pacific Aquarium closed in 2018 with the opening of the Pacific Seas Aquarium.

By the end of the decade, a breeding program was begun for red wolves, which had been declared an endangered species in 1967.

Turn-of-the-century cages were deteriorating again in the early 1970s. After a $7 million bond measure was passed in 1977, the Zoo opened the Arctic Tundra complex in 1981 and the Rocky Shores area in 1982. With a smaller bond passed in 1986, the South Pacific Aquarium was built and then opened in 1989.

The Zoo experienced financial trouble in the 1990s, culminating in the probation of its AZA accreditation in 1999. Another bond, passed in that year, and a local sales tax increase shored up funds for improvements. With over $35 million at its disposal, the Zoo built a new animal hospital, an outdoor animal theater, an Asian Forest Sanctuary, much of the Kids' Zone children's zoo, and a renovated entrance.

In 2008, an addition to Kids' Zone, Animal Avenue, was opened. The red wolf exhibit was renovated and re-opened in 2010, and a clouded leopard exhibit called Cats of the Canopy opened on August 27, 2011.

=== Beluga Whales ===
The zoo used to house beluga whales. A previous couple of belugas, Millie and Christy, died almost in unison in 2000. Mauyak was sent to Shedd Aquarium in 1997 for breeding, where she gave birth not only to Qannik but also to Miki.

In March 2009 one of the two belugas, Qannik, died of a blood infection. Beethoven, Qannik's tankmate, was sent to SeaWorld, San Antonio, on June 5, 2009. Turner (Beethoven's brother) died three years earlier on September 7, 2006, of chronic liver failure, which resulted in Qannik being brought to the zoo in June 2007, soon after Beethoven had recovered from a severe infection.

It's unknown yet if there will be new belugas since Beethoven's departure. None are scheduled to arrive any time in the foreseeable future and Rocky Shores currently (temporarily or permanently) houses harbor seals and California sea lions where belugas used to swim.

=== Zoolights ===
Since 1988, the zoo has hosted an annual holiday light display within the park called Zoolights. This event is usually held between November and January. There are more than 800,000 lights on display based on holiday and zoo animal themes. Visitors can purchase tickets to walk through the park at night and view the various lights.

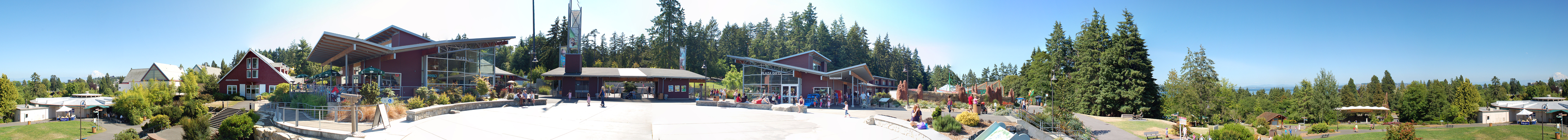
360° panorama of the Point Defiance Zoo and Aquarium

== Exhibits ==
The exhibits reflect the zoo's theme of ecosystems from the Pacific rim: Southeast Asia, the Pacific Northwest, the tundra, and aquatic environments.

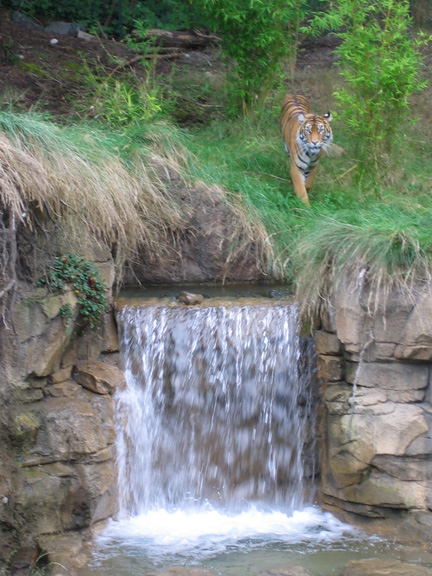
A tiger at the top of a waterfall in Asian Forest Sanctuary

Asian Forest Sanctuary

This 5 acre (2.0 ha) exhibit complex which opened on July 1, 2004 simulates the forests of southeast Asia with a waterfall, streams, and plants native to the region such as bamboo. The complex is designed so that species are rotated to different parts of the exhibit each day. Asian Forest Sanctuary includes Sumatran tigers, northern white-cheeked gibbons, siamangs, and formerly an Asian elephant named Suki that died in August 2024.

An expansion called Cats of the Canopy opened on August 27, 2011, and focuses on the clouded leopard. Viewing is provided by a wide glass window along a gravelly stream bed and into a heated den. The twenty-foot high enclosure also allows the cats to climb through the trees.

Kazu, an endangered male Malayan tapir, was born on July 12, 2019.

Rocky Shores

Completed in 1982, this exhibit is based on the shoreline of Cape Flattery, Washington, and serves as home to harbor seals, California sea lions, sea otters, horned puffins, common murres, and tufted puffins in separate pools. In the middle of the exhibit area is a building for underwater viewing. The exhibit formerly contained beluga whales until they were taken to a zoo in Texas in 2007. It also contains Pacific walruses Balzik and Lakina, half siblings from Aquarium du Quebec, born in 2016. The zoo's previous two walruses Mitik and Pakak were shipped to another zoo where they had females.

Arctic Tundra

1981 saw the opening of this exhibit area, which forms a semicircle at one end of the zoo. Muskoxen are housed in a large meadow on the outside of the pathway's arc, while polar bears and Arctic fox live on the inside of the arc. The polar bears have an eleven-foot-deep pool with above- and underwater viewing.

The Aquariums

There are two aquariums: the Pacific Seas Aquarium and South Pacific Aquarium. They each house species from different parts of the Pacific Ocean. In September 2018, the Pacific Seas Aquarium opened, replacing the North Pacific Aquarium that opened in 1963. The Pacific Seas Aquarium's Baja Bay tank features scalloped hammerheads, spotted eagle rays and green sea turtles. Other highlights in the exhibit include a 10,000-US-gallon (38,000 L) Puget sound tank, a kelp forest tank, a cold water invertebrate touch tank, jellyfish globe and kreisels, a schooling fish exhibit, a giant Pacific octopus, and Japanese spider crabs. The Pacific Seas Aquarium was built with the latest green life support system technology and includes a rainwater capture system for use in non potable water supplies.

The 1989-era South Pacific Aquarium simulated tropical Pacific environments, and in 2024 it reopened to the public as the Tropical Reef Aquarium. It features coral reef tanks, a lagoon exhibit, a blue hole exhibit, and a touch tank. The lagoon has small fish and eels, while the 250,000-US-gallon (950,000 L) Outer Reef tank has nurse sharks, blacktip reef sharks, grey reef sharks, whitetip reef sharks, zebra sharks, a bowmouth guitarfish, and a tasselled wobbegong. In the touch tank are stingrays, epaulette sharks, and whitespotted bamboo sharks. As of 2024, shark dives at the Outer Reef Habitat are open to the public.

Red Wolf Woods

The habitat was rebuilt in 2009 and opened again in the summer of 2010. The exhibit consists of two separate meadows with a rocky creek, hollow log, and other landscaping. The conservation center is designed to look like an abandoned farm building.

Kids' Zone

A number of animals are present including Nigerian dwarf goats, and Parma wallabies. There are also colorful play structures and a petting zoo with activities such as goat feeding present.

Animal Avenue, a children's zoo expansion, allows people to meet a variety of species including meerkats, ring-tailed lemurs, and black and white ruffed lemurs.

Along with two other sections of the Kids' Zone Magical Movement and Contact Junction.

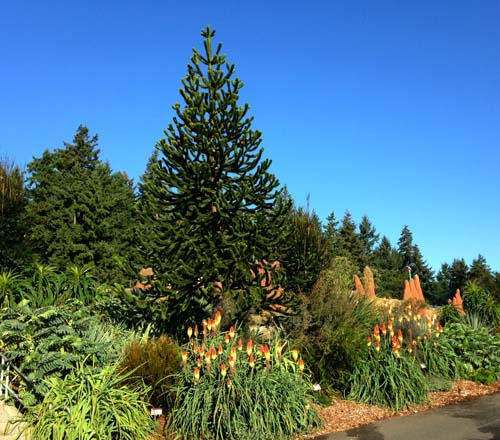
Blooming Kniphofia with a monkey puzzle tree (Araucaria araucana)

Botanical Garden

The certified Point Defiance Zoo Botanical Garden displays a collection of a variety of bamboos (over 50 species), massive meadows filled with Lobelia tupa, fragrant perennials to attract pollinators, and many varieties of trees and shrubs planted throughout the grounds. The collection boasts a variety of flora from the Baja Peninsula, the Southern Hemisphere, Alaskan landscape, plants from South Eastern United States, wildflowers, desert garden, Asian Forest Sanctuary, and the Native Northwest. The landscaping was developed in an effort to share how and why animals, plants, and people need to coexist. The Zoo is home to hundreds of varieties of plants from decorative to functional, and also provides botanical garden tours monthly by the Zoo Horticulturist.

Other exhibits

Unincorporated exhibits include an artificial tide pool, a Magellanic penguin habitat, a seasonal budgie exhibit and Indian Peafowl which roam freely throughout the Zoo grounds. The zoo also formerly had Camel Rides but when they decided to build the Nature Play Garden, the Dromedary Camels moved back to their owners at a local farm.

== Conservation ==
One focus of the zoo's conservation work is the red wolf. Beginning in 1969, the zoo collected wild red wolves and successfully bred them for the first time in 1977. The U.S. Fish and Wildlife Service had removed the last fourteen wolves from the wild by 1980, and in 1984 the zoo received approval from the AZA to start a Species Survival Plan. By 1987 the number of red wolves in captivity was large enough to release some of them back into the wild. Reintroduced wolves continue to survive and breed in the wild, and by 2002 the world population was 175 in captivity and about 100 in the wild. One of the biggest threats to the wild population is coyote-wolf hybridization.

A 2021 effort to breed endangered Sumatran tigers ended in the death of a six-year-old female tiger who was fatally wounded by her two-year-old potential mate. This was an attempt to save the endangered species considering there are roughly only four hundred Sumatran tigers left in the wild.
