= Parks Tacoma =

Park district serving Tacoma, Washington

Parks Tacoma (formerly the Metro Parks Tacoma) is a municipal corporation that oversees parks and recreation services in and around the city of Tacoma, Washington, United States.

== History ==
The parks district was originally a part of the Tacoma city government, established by the city's 1880 charter. In 1883 city councilmembers were appointed to oversee city parks, and in 1890 a board of park commissioners was appointed by the mayor. In 1907 the Washington State Legislature passed legislation which allowed cities to form separate park districts. That same year, the city government created the Metropolitan Park District of Tacoma, an entity independent of the city government with its own authority to collect property taxes.

Parks Tacoma owns and operates parks and recreation facilities in the city of Tacoma as well as the unincorporated areas of Browns Point and Dash Point.

Parks Tacoma is overseen by a board of five commissioners, all elected by voters city-wide and each serving staggered six-year terms.

Formerly known as Metro Parks Tacoma, it was renamed January 14, 2025.

== Notable facilities ==
- Point Defiance Park, including the following facilities located within the park boundaries:
  - Point Defiance Zoo and Aquarium
  - Fort Nisqually
- Wright Park Arboretum
  - W. W. Seymour Botanical Conservatory, located within Wright Park
- Northwest Trek Wildlife Park near Eatonville
- Titlow Beach
