= Tacoma Weekly =

- Type: Weekly newspaper
- Format: Broadsheet
- Owner: Tacoma Weekly
- Publisher: Matt Nagle
- Editor: Matt Nagle
- Founded: 1987
- Headquarters: P.O Box 7185 Tacoma WA 98417
- Circulation: 10,000 Weekly
- Price: Free
- Website: tacomaweekly.com

Tacoma Weekly is a weekly community newspaper published by Matt Nagle. The paper started in 1987 as the Tacoma Monthly and in 1994 became the Tacoma Weekly. The free newspaper is distributed on Wednesdays to hundreds of businesses and public spaces in the Tacoma area. It has used a broadsheet format since 2001.

== Controversies ==
In a recent two-year period, publisher John Weymer paid $9,157.06 in wage theft claims that were filed against him at the Washington Department of Labor and Industries. Since 1995, Weymer has accumulated over $170,000 in judgements against himself and his business. In 2019, a judge ruled Weymer owed $5,000 to the Grand Cinema after failing to deliver a printing job the cinema paid for.

In September 2021, Tacoma Weekly was fined $15,000 for offering political candidates a news story or endorsement from the paper in exchange for money. The Washington State Public Disclosure Commission found that the paper ran cover stories for two paying candidates that were written under a staff member's byline without mention of it being a paid advertisement. John Weymer claimed that the fine was an overreaction to a mistake the paper committed, and insisted that the cover stories followed the paper's editorial guidelines and were not meant to be advertisements.
