= Highbush cranberry =

Highbush cranberry is a common name for several plants and may refer to:

- Viburnum trilobum, American highbush cranberry
- Viburnum opulus, European highbush cranberry
- Viburnum edule, squashberry, native to North America
