= Seattle Chinese Garden =

Chinese garden in Seattle, Washington, U.S.

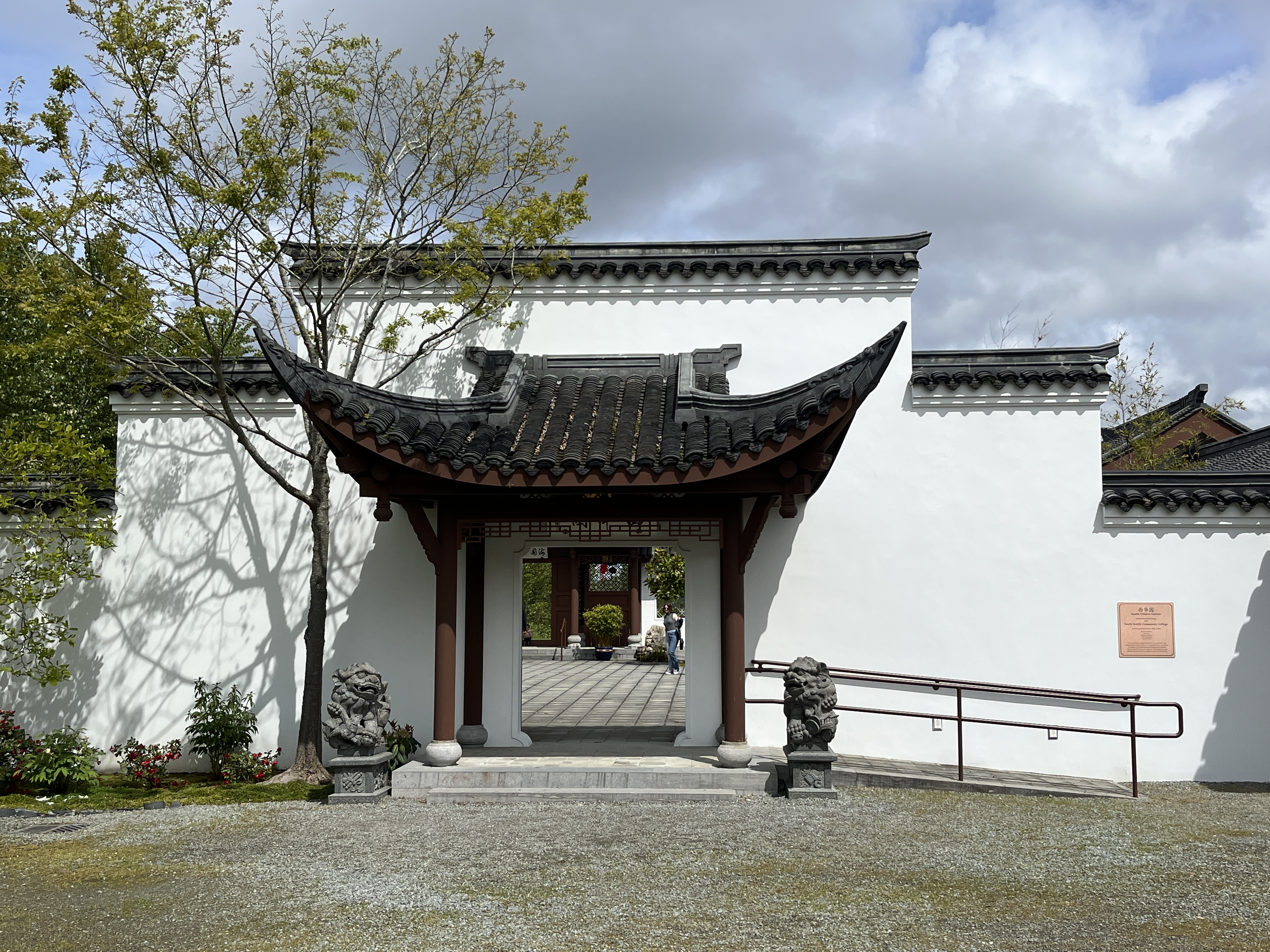
- Interactive map of Seattle Chinese Garden
- Location: 6000 16th Avenue SW; Seattle, Washington, U.S.
- Coordinates: 47°33′05″N 122°21′15″W
- Area: South Seattle College campus
- Website: www.seattlechinesegarden.org

The Seattle Chinese Garden (Chinese: 西華園; pinyin: Xī Huáyuán; Jyutping: Sai1 Waa4jyun4; lit. 'West Chinese garden') is a Sichuanese garden located on 4.6 acres (1.9 hectares) on the South Seattle College campus in West Seattle. The site has a panoramic view of Downtown Seattle, Elliott Bay, and the Cascade Mountains, including Mount Baker and Mount Rainier. The first portion of the garden opened in the early 1990s.

== History and attributes ==
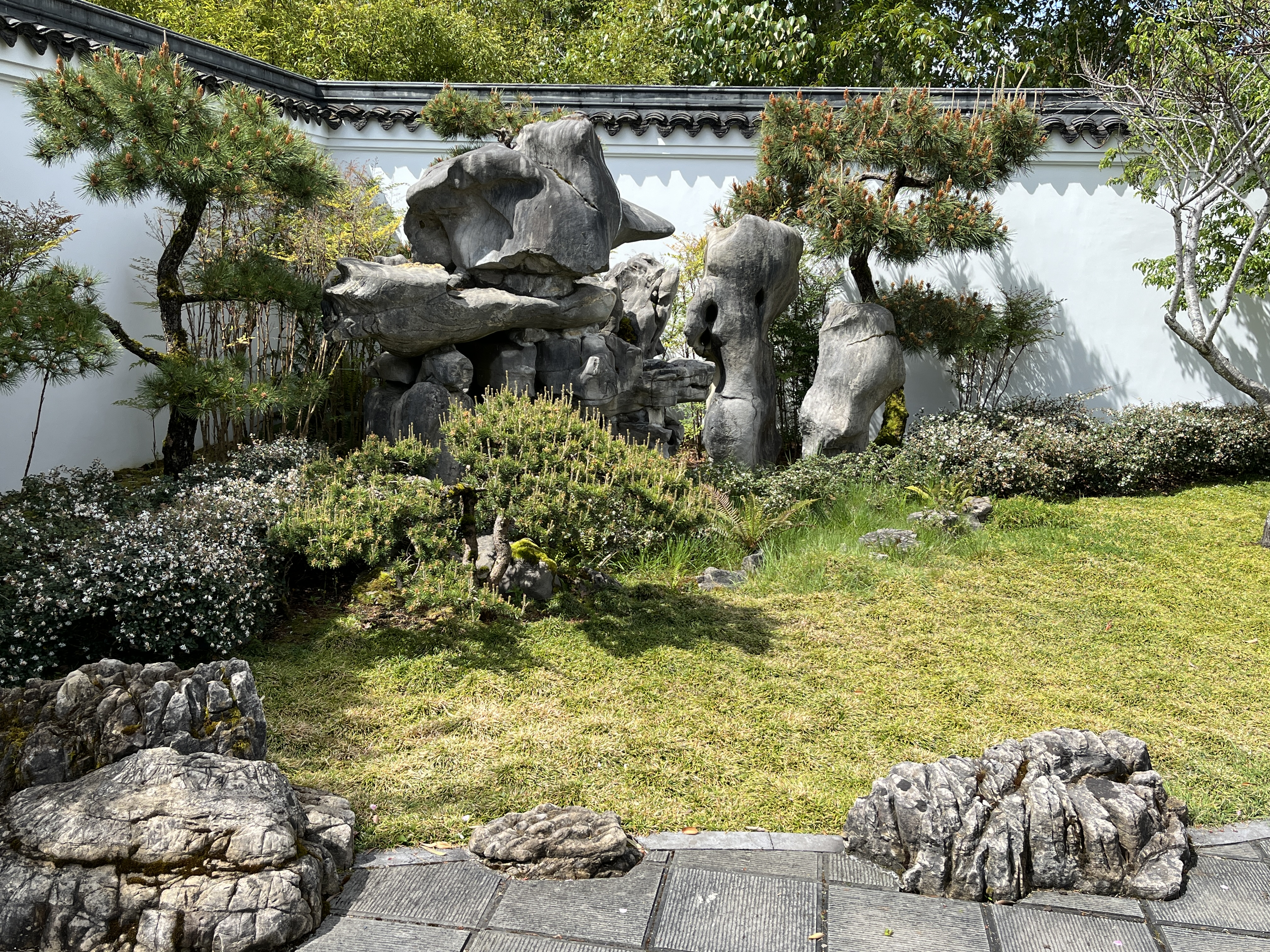
The garden in 2023

When fully built, the garden will be one of the largest Chinese gardens outside of China. Designed and built in conjunction with architects and artisans from Seattle and its sister city, Chongqing, the garden will is the first in the United States to authentically represent the Sichuan style. The Garden features Sichuan horticulture and the rock formations inspired by China's Yangtze River gorges. Where possible, its formal halls and pavilions were fabricated in Chongqing using traditional materials and methods, and artisans from China supervised their installation in Seattle.

The Garden is being constructed in phases. The first phase, the Pine and Plum Pavilion, was opened in the early 1990s. The "Knowing the Spring Courtyard," the second traditional structure in the Garden, was completed in the fall of 2010 and opened to the public in February 2011. In May 2011 a Grand Opening celebration was held with dignitaries from Seattle and Chongqing attending. Components for this courtyard were fabricated in Chongqing, and assembly performed by Chinese artisans from Chongqing and local contractors. The entire project was expected to be completed in 2017.

The Garden will have a range of Chinese plants and horticultural elements. There will be a palette of Chinese plants placed in an authentic Sichuan landscape design, a collection of Sichuan-style penjing (Chinese bonsai), and classes available in horticultural subjects as well as the Chinese cultural arts.

The Garden will also feature 12 buildings, including an education center and a banquet hall with special event seating for up to 200 people. The Garden's 85-foot (26 m) "Floating Clouds Pavilion" will soar over the Garden, placed on an axis with the Space Needle. The completed Chongqing Tower, a four-story tier tower, is planned to be completed in 2030 if $30 million in funding is raised.

== See also ==
- Seattle Japanese Garden
