= Cascade Cereal Company =

Flour and cereal milling company

- Industry: Milling business
- Predecessor: Cascade Oatmeal Company
- Founded: August 1892; 134 years ago in Tacoma, Washington, United States
- Founder: John Wesley Berry
- Fate: Acquired by Albers Brothers Milling Company
- Successor: Albers Brothers Mill
- Headquarters: Tacoma, Washington, United States
- Area served: North America; South–East Asia
- Key people: John Wesley Berry (founder, president, manager); J. G. Deming (president); Bernard Albers (proprietor, president)
- Products: Cereal; flour
- Production output: 46,950 U.S. dry bbl (5,429 m^{3}) of flour; 31,300 U.S. dry bbl (3,620 m^{3}) of rolled oats; 31,300 U.S. dry bbl (3,620 m^{3}) of meal; (1900)
- Services: Flour and cereal production; product distribution
- Revenue: $300,000 (equivalent to $11,610,000 in 2025) (1900)
- Owner: John Wesley Berry; Charles W. Quinn(proprietor); Albers Brothers
- Number of employees: 25 (1900)
- Parent: Albers Brothers Milling Company

The Cascade Cereal Company was a flour and cereal milling company in Tacoma, Washington. Originally named the Cascade Oatmeal Company, it was the first oat and cereal mill in the American west. Founded by Washington state pioneer John Wesley Berry in 1888, the company expanded quickly, opening additional mills and warehouses. By 1900, there were four more milling companies in Tacoma, and the Cascade Cereal Company was second in sales behind the Puget Sound Mills Company. The Cascade Cereal Company bid and won contracts to supply state schools and hospitals, and exported products to southeast Asia.

During the panic of 1893, John Berry lost control of the company. Under the supervision of the new president, J. G. Deming, he proceeded as its manager. In 1903, the company was bought by Albers Brothers, and later became part of the Albers Brothers Milling Company.

A fire on July 24, 1903, destroyed the company's headquarters and main mill. The extensive damage wasn't fully covered by insurance, resulting in heavy losses to the owners. Eventually, the plant was rebuilt in 1905 as Albers Brothers Mill of Tacoma, and in 1984, the building was added to the National Register of Historic Places. The same year, the Nestle Corporation bought the Albers trademark to produce grits and cornmeal under the Albers brand name.

== History ==
=== Cascade Oatmeal Company ===
The Cascade Cereal Company started from one mill, built by John Wesley Berry in 1888, the first oat and cereal mill in the west. The five-story building occupied a 100 ft × 100 ft (30 m × 30 m) area on Jefferson Avenue in Tacoma.

The Cascade Oatmeal Company was officially incorporated in August 1892 with $100,000 in capital, equivalent to $3.58 million in 2025. John Berry became its president, and one of the proprietors was his brother-in-law, Charles W. Quinn.

In 1892, the Cascade Oatmeal mill became the first in Washington state to have weevils in their wheat. In an attempt to retain the price of the product and insurance rates, the information was withheld for some time. However, later the company managers broke their silence. Their official statement was that the weevils came to the area in San Francisco wheat, and that their local product was free of weevils. Another Washingtonian businessman called the attempt to conceal the truth "nonsense," arguing that there was no chance the product could stay free of the pests forever. The company experienced more difficulty when John Berry purchased a share in the Oakesdale Milling Company. The partnership didn't work, and both the Tacoma and Oakesdale mills were temporarily closed.

In 1893, a trade relationship was established between America and southeast Asia. During this time, the flour business was considered very profitable, as flour was one of the most demanded products. Berry rushed to build an additional flour mill in Tacoma, faster than similar arrangements were made in Seattle. The mill was to be located near the Cascade Oatmeal mill on Jefferson Avenue, with a production capacity of 150 U.S. dry bbl (15 MTON) a day.

=== Cascade Cereal Company ===
In 1895, the Cascade Cereal Company was incorporated, replacing the Cascade Oatmeal Company. Its capital was $10,000 (equivalent to $387,000 in 2025), which consisted of 100 shares of $100 each (equivalent to $3,870 in 2025). The incorporators for the new company were John Wesley Berry, M. E. Quinn, and N. M. L. Berry.

The U.S. Panic of 1893 caused a change in management. John Berry lost control of the company, and later, worked as its manager. In 1900, J. G. Deming was president of the company, J. J. Deming was vice president, L. D. Coates secretary and treasurer, and John Berry was a manager. Prosser, one of the founders of the Washington State Historical Society, however, stated, that by 1903, Berry regained his original share of the company.

Over the years, the mill improved and expanded. Prosser stated that the mill was fitted with "high-grade" equipment, and produced "the very best rolled oats, cereals and flours" of that time. In 1900, under the new management, a new warehouse was erected, with the capacity to store 20,000 sacks of oats. Also, a new plant was built to produce pearl barley.

The company had 25 employees and could produce 150 U.S. dry bbl (17 m^{3}) of flour, 100 U.S. dry bbl (12 m^{3}) of rolled oats, and 100 U.S. dry bbl (12 m^{3}) of meal daily. The annual output value during 1900 was estimated at $300,000, equivalent to $11.6 million in 2025. At the time, the Cascade Cereal Company was one of five milling companies in Tacoma. Their combined output was appraised at $2 million (equivalent to $77.4 million in 2025). The leader in the field was the Puget Sound Flouring Mills, with an output value of $1.5 million (equivalent to $58.1 million in 2025); the Cascade Cereal Company was in the second place.

In 1900–1901, the company bid for and won a number of government contracts to supply state institutions, including the Western Washington hospital, the state reform school, and the Soldier's home.

In 1902, the Cascade Cereal Company was bought by Albers Brothers. Bernard Albers became the president, owning a controlling share of the company. Under his management, the company produced 150 barrels of rolled oats and 125 barrels of flour daily.

Besides the Cascade Cereal Company, Albers owned a number of other companies across the U.S., and on March 1, 1903, he reorganized them into the historic Albers Brothers Milling Company.

=== The fire and aftermath ===
On July 24, 1903, the Cascade Cereal Company was destroyed by fire. A number of other establishments and residential buildings, were also either destroyed or damaged by fire and water. It took 35 minutes for the fire to bring down the company's mill building and then move to adjacent buildings. The fire was extinguished about 30 minutes later.

At the time, the mill's value was estimated at $90,000 (equivalent to $3.23 million in 2025), of which $30,000 (equivalent to $1.08 million in 2025), was invested in product stock. The insurance for the mill was appraised at about $54,000 (equivalent to $1.94 million in 2025), and the loss value for the building at $150,000 (equivalent to $5.38 million in 2025).

In a San Juan Islander news note, the fire was called "one of the hottest in the history of the city." The statement was also supported by the annual report of the Tacoma fire department. It stated, that the fire, in fact, was one of the four "largest fires the department ever had to handle," and the total loss for the city was appraised at $97,000 (equivalent to $3.48 million in 2025).

The generally accepted cause of the fire was a spark from a passing locomotive, that ignited the shavings in one of the Cascade mill rooms on the ground floor.

=== Later years ===
In 1905, the plant was rebuilt under the name of Albers Brothers Mill of Tacoma. Bernard Albers was the president of the company until his death in 1908. In 1984, the company building in Tacoma, which was considered "the best physical reminder of the Albers Brothers Milling Company," was added to the National Register of Historic Places. In the same year, the Nestle Corporation bought the Albers trademark and started grits and cornmeal production under the Albers brand name.

== See also ==
- John Wesley Berry
- Albers Brothers Milling Company
- Albers Brothers Mill
- Western State Hospital (Washington)

== Literature cited ==
- "CPI Inflation Calculator", Bureau of Labor Statistics, Washington: United States Department of Labor
- "Weevil in Tacoma wheat", Seattle Post-Intelligencer, Seattle: Leigh S. J. Hunt, p. 2, March 11, 1892, ISSN 2379-7304, LCCN sn83045604, OCLC 9563195
- Murphy, John Miller, ed. (July 1, 1892), "Real estate transfers", The Washington Standard, Olympia: McClatchy, p. 2, ISSN 2379-7339, LCCN sn84022770, OCLC 10580261
- "New Incorporations", Seattle Post-Intelligencer, Seattle: Leigh S. J. Hunt, p. 8, August 2, 1892, ISSN 2379-7304, LCCN sn83045604, OCLC 9563195
- "Mills shut down", The Spokane Review, Spokane: Review Pub. Co, p. 7, October 1, 1892, LCCN sn86072024, OCLC 14375325
- "Growing oriental trade", Seattle Post-Intelligencer, Seattle: Leigh S. J. Hunt, p. 8, May 8, 1893, ISSN 2379-7304, LCCN sn83045604, OCLC 9563195
- "Brief Tacoma news", Seattle Post-Intelligencer, Seattle: Leigh S. J. Hunt, p. 1, May 9, 1893, ISSN 2379-7304, LCCN sn83045604, OCLC 9563195
- "News Notes", United States Miller and Weather and Crop journal, vol. XIX, no. 12, Milwaukee: U.S. Miller Co., pp. 206–208, December 1, 1894, LCCN 19018914, OCLC 64221818
- "New Incorporations", Seattle Post-Intelligencer, Seattle: Leigh S. J. Hunt, p. 3, September 8, 1895, ISSN 2379-7304, LCCN sn83045604, OCLC 9563195
- "Pacific coast", Weekly Modern Miller, vol. 26, no. 16, St. Louis, p. 14, September 22, 1900, OCLC 1114927921
- "Awards for supplies", Seattle Post-Intelligencer, Seattle: Leigh S. J. Hunt, p. 8, October 4, 1900, ISSN 2379-7304, LCCN sn83045604, OCLC 9563195
- "The hum of industry", The West Coast Trade, vol. XII, no. 47, Tacoma: Orno Strong, pp. 21–28, January 1, 1901, LCCN ca07007079, OCLC 56435557
- "Splendid Commercial Growth", The West Coast Trade, vol. XII, no. 47, Tacoma: Orno Strong, p. 28, January 1, 1901, LCCN ca07007079, OCLC 56435557
- "Made awards for supplies", The Spokesman-Review, Spokane: Cowles Company, p. 8, April 3, 1901, ISSN 1064-7317, LCCN sn84024754, OCLC 11102610
- Murphy, John Miller, ed. (April 5, 1901), "Supply contracts awarded", The Washington Standard, Olympia: McClatchy, p. 2, ISSN 2379-7339, LCCN sn84022770, OCLC 10580261
- Portrait and Biographical Record of Portland and Vicinity Oregon: Containing Original Sketches of many well known Citizens of the Past and Present (PDF), Genealogy collection, Chicago: Chapman Publishing Company, 1903, OCLC 950945396
- Blethen, Alden J., ed. (July 25, 1903), "Fierce fire rages", Seattle Daily Times, Seattle: The Seattle Times Company, p. 10, ISSN 2639-4898, LCCN sn86072007, OCLC 1765328
- "A big fire at Tacoma", Seattle Star, vol. 5, no. 130, Seattle: E. W. Scripps, p. 1, July 25, 1903, ISSN 2159-5577, LCCN sn87093407, OCLC 17285351
- "Blaze at Tacoma", San Juan Islander, Friday Harbor: Culver Bros., p. 3, July 30, 1903, LCCN sn88085190, OCLC 42342745
- "Two Tacoma plants burn", The Spokesman-Review, Spokane: Cowles Company, p. 8, July 30, 1903, ISSN 1064-7317, LCCN sn84024754, OCLC 11102610
- Murphy, John Miller, ed. (July 31, 1903), "Editor notes", The Washington Standard, Olympia: McClatchy, p. 2, ISSN 2379-7339, LCCN sn84022770, OCLC 10580261
- Scripps, Edward, ed. (January 13, 1904), "Year's record of Tacoma fire department", The Tacoma Times, Tacoma: E. W. Scripps Company, p. 4, ISSN 2158-4729, LCCN sn88085187, OCLC 17347623
- Sketches of Washingtonians: Containing Brief Histories of Men of the State of Washington Engaged in Professional and Political Life, in Manufacture, Commerce, Finance and Religion; with a Summary of the Cities of the State Containing Upwards of 5,000 Population (PDF), Seattle: Wellington C. Wolfe & Co, 1907, ISBN 9780217994071, LCCN 07003167, OCLC 935118482
- Blethen, Alden J., ed. (March 7, 1908), "Head of milling interests is dead", Seattle Daily Times, Seattle: The Seattle Times Company, p. 3, ISSN 2639-4898, LCCN sn86072007, OCLC 1765328
- "Andrew J. Bell dies", Seattle Daily Times, Seattle: The Seattle Times Company, p. 2, June 25, 1921, ISSN 2639-4898, LCCN sn86072007, OCLC 1765328
- Carey, Charles Henry (1922), History of Oregon (PDF), Genealogy collection, Portland: Pioneer Historical Publishing Company, LCCN 22020446, OCLC 210895549
- Clark, F. J. (May 2, 1900), "The Pacific Northwest", The Northwestern Miller, vol. 49, no. 18, Minneapolis: Miller Publishing Co., pp. 1, 849, ISSN 0029-3539, LCCN 44027596, OCLC 1760727
- Hunt, Herbert (1916), Tacoma its history and its builders; a half century of activity, vol. 1, Chicago: S. J. Clarke Publishing Company, LCCN 18005073, OCLC 656923949
- Prosser, William Farrand (1903), Lewis, Edward Gardner (ed.), A history of the Puget Sound country, its resources, its commerce and its people, New York City: Edward Gardner Lewis, LCCN 05013767
- Purcell, Sondra (October 25, 2001), McDonald, Christie (ed.), "National Register of Historic Places Continuation Sheet", National Park Service, Washington, D.C.: United States Department of the Interior
