= John Wesley Berry =

American businessman

- Born: 1857 (Note: 1857 is the year given according to Prosser, a founder of the Washington State Historical Society. However, Berry's tombstone photograph provide at Find a Grave shows 1858 as his birth year.); Jacksonville, Illinois
- Died: August 13, 1931 (aged 73–74); Tacoma, Washington
- Burial place: Tacoma Cemetery
- Occupations: Councilman of Tacoma; Cascade Oatmeal Company president, manager; Deming-Berry Company vice president, treasurer, manager
- Organizations: Epworth Methodist Episcopal church; Independent Order of Odd Fellows; Foresters Friendly Society
- Known for: Pioneer, councilman and businessman of Tacoma, Washington. Established the first oat and cereal mill, distributed products around Washington state and abroad; invented split pulley; established the manufacture of mechanical supplies.
- Political party: Republican
- Spouse: Lillian M. Ball (married in 1879)
- Children: 4
- Parents: Preston A. Berry (father); Martha Jane Berry (Harris) (mother)

John Wesley Berry (1857 – August 13, 1931) was an American pioneer, businessman, and politician from Tacoma, Washington. His main business was flour and cereal production. Berry built the first oat and cereal mill of the west, in Tacoma, and established the Cascade Cereal Company, the second-most successful mill in the city. An experienced mechanic, Berry invented and patented the split pulley. He co-founded the Deming-Berry Company, which specialized in mechanical supplies manufacturing. Both of Berry's companies supplied their products to a number of state institutions, including schools and hospitals.

Berry was a trustee and the vice president of the Bank of Tacoma, and incorporator of the Tacoma Brick Company and Sumner Grain & Milling Company. At the pinnacle of his political career, in 1892–93, Berry was a Tacoma Councilman, later losing this position after a water-plant purchase controversy. He also served as a superintendent and teacher at the Washington State Sunday School.

In 1903, the Cascade Cereal Company and Deming-Berry Company were destroyed by a fire, resulting in damages not fully covered by insurance. Berry lost his management positions in both companies. Later in his life, he worked as an insurance agent.

== Early life, family and education ==
John Berry was born near Jacksonville, Illinois in 1857. He lived on a family farm and went to the local school until he was fourteen years old. He was the son of Preston A. Berry and Martha Jane Berry (Harris). Berry's father, born in Greenfield, Illinois, moved to a farm near Jacksonville, where he worked as a livestock merchant. Later, Preston took part in California Gold Rush, locating and then selling gold deposits in California. In later years, both parents joined their son in Tacoma.

== Career ==
=== Illinois and Indiana ===
At the age of fourteen, Berry decided to learn a trade. He found a job at a grist mill in Jacksonville and worked there for seven years, learning every detail of the business. Later, he spent a year working in Marion, Illinois, and then as a miller in Montezuma, Indiana. He worked at the mill until he was twenty-six years old, and then bought it to run the business himself. In 1887, he sold it and left the city.

=== First jobs in Tacoma, Washington ===
Berry came to Tacoma intending to work in flour and cereal production, however, the building boom of the city diverted him from his plans. In 1887, he became one of the incorporators and trustees for the Tacoma Brick Company, and worked as a brick maker for the following year and a half. His product was used for the base of the first four-story Tacoma building: the Northern Pacific Railway headquarters. For six months afterwards, Berry and his father worked as horse dealers.

=== Flour and cereal milling business ===
Eventually, Berry returned to his original plan, and started to work in the production of flour and cereal. In 1888, he built the mill on Jefferson Avenue, which was the first oat and cereal mill in the West. It was a five-story building that covered 100 ft × 100 ft (30 m × 30 m) of ground, furnished with "high-grade" equipment. The mill's products were praised as "the very best." In August 1892, Berry officially incorporated the Cascade Oatmeal Company and became its president. Charles W. Quinn, Berry's brother-in-law, was one of the proprietors.

In 1892, the Cascade Oatmeal mill was engulfed in controversy, as it became the first mill in the state to struggle with weevils in their wheat. At first, the information was withheld, but later, the company's representatives asserted that the weevils had been imported with the San Francisco wheat, and the local product was free of it. The same year, Berry's company purchased a share of the Oakesdale Milling Company flour mill. However, due to business difficulties, the partnership was soon dissolved and the mills in Tacoma and Oakesdale were temporarily closed.

In 1893, trade relations between America and Southeast Asia began. According to workers on the route, flour was in high demand, and the milling business was considered very profitable. By this time, Berry had already begun to expand a new flour mill producing 100–150 U.S. dry bbl (10–15 MTON) a day. The new mill was located near the old one on Jefferson Avenue.

In 1895, the Cascade Oatmeal Company was reorganized into the Cascade Cereal Company of Tacoma, with incorporators John Berry, N. M. L. Berry, and M. E. Quinn. In 1900, the company expanded, building another warehouse and a plant for pearl barley production. Cascade Cereal Company had 25 employees, producing 150 U.S. dry bbl (15 MTON) of flour, 100 U.S. dry bbl (10 MTON) of rolled oats, and 100 U.S. dry bbl (10 MTON) of meal daily. Its output value was $300,000 ($785,000 in 2020 dollars (Note: The approximate value converted to 2020 dollars, based on a standard adjustment of the 1913 dollar value using the Consumer Price Index as calculated by United States Department of Labor.)).

At the time, five Tacoma companies worked in the business, and their total output was appraised at $2,000,000 ($52,000,000). The Cascade Cereal Company was second in sales after the Puget Sound Flouring Mills, which had an output value of $1,500,00 ($39,000,000). Cascade Cereal Company successfully bid on government contracts and supplied its products to various state institutions, including the Western Washington hospital, the state reform school, and the Soldier's home.

During the U.S. economic depression of 1893–1897, Berry lost control of the mill. J. G. Deming became the president of the company, and Berry continued as its manager. (Note: Founder of the Washington State Historical Society, Prosser, believed, however, that Berry regained his original share by 1903.) Later, the company was bought by Albers Brothers, and Berry continued working under the presidency of Bernard Albers.

=== Business in mechanics ===
Berry was interested in mechanics throughout his life. Eventually, he invented and patented an "automatic self–tightening split–wood pulley." Deciding to pursue a career in this field, he was one of the organizers in 1901, incorporators in 1902, and at different times, a vice president, treasurer, and manager of the Deming-Berry Company (which replaced the Tacoma Automatic Scale Company). The new factory manufactured and supplied automatic scales as well as pulleys, clutches, sprockets, and other mechanical devices. The company's building was located on Jefferson Avenue, alongside the Cascade Cereal mill.

At first, device production only required two employees, but the number of orders grew rapidly and the company soon needed to expand. There were plans to erect a much bigger manufacturing plant on the Center Street. The planned facility, powered by electricity, included a two-story brick factory, warehouse, and a brick kiln. The plans were ruined by the fire that destroyed two of Berry's establishments with all of the equipment.

=== The fire and its aftermath ===
On July 24, 1903, the Cascade Cereal Company, the Deming-Berry Company, and all of the machinery for the new factory were destroyed by the fire. It took 35 minutes for the Cascade mill building to collapse, and for the fire to spread to neighboring buildings.

The generally accepted cause of the fire was a spark igniting from a passing locomotive that lit the shavings in one of the Cascade mill rooms on the ground floor. In the annual fire department report, the fire was named one of the four "largest fires the department ever had to handle." The report appraised the financial loss of the fire at $97,000 ($2,500,000).

Berry's total loss was appraised at $125,000 ($3,270,000); and the worth of the destroyed property was estimated at $150,000 ($4,000,000). Berry himself declared his loss "a heavy one" and "one which will prove a hard blow to the two big establishments." At the time, the Cascade Cereal mill's worth was estimated at $90,000 ($2,300,000), and the pulley factory's value was $45,000 ($1,100,000). The total insurance payment for both buildings was about $80,000 ($2,000,000).

=== Later career ===
After the fire, Berry left the milling business, instead working as a real estate loans and insurance agent. He became a member of the Berry & Spaulding Company and the president of the B. S. Security Co.

In the years to come, Berry was occasionally involved in the milling business. In 1913, he was put in charge of the new flour, cereal and feed mill, established by the businessmen of the Consumers' Manufacturing & Supply Association. Later, in 1921, he was also among the incorporators for the Sumner Grain & Milling Company in Sumner, Washington.

=== Other positions ===
In February 1894, Berry became a trustee for the officially incorporated Bank of Tacoma. Later that year he served as its director, and in 1895, he became the vice president of the bank.

For seven years Berry was a superintendent of the Washington State Sunday School and taught a class of twenty-five girls. In 1900, he was among the members of the executive committee for the Sunday School convention.

== Political activity ==
Berry actively participated in the social and political life of the city. In 1892–1893, he served as an independent Republican Councilman of Tacoma for the Seventh Ward.

In 1892–93, he was involved in a controversy concerning the purchase of the water plant for the city. There were many discussions and arguments in regard to the price, and the city officials came to doubt the purchase. Later, the politicians who were against the deal changed their minds to support it, and Berry was among them. He stated, "If you don't do it, you will have the Northern Pacific Railroad, the Tacoma Land Company, and the Tacoma Light and Water Company, representing a quarter of the value of the city, against you." Opponents to the purchase included another Washington pioneer, Aaron R. Titlow, who urged the people not to surrender to the corporations.

At the time, a Seattle Post-Intelligencer article alleged that the company selling the plant spent $50,000 ($1,300,000) to support the election in favor of the purchase, and made a deal with the City Council. Eventually, in the elections of March 30, it was decided to purchase the plant; 3,200 out of 5,181 votes were in favor of the deal.

Berry ran for office again in 1894. Despite the landslide victory of the Republican party, his candidacy wasn't supported due to his connection with the city "swindles", such as the water plant purchase. However, he re-entered politics in 1904, running among the Republican candidates for the Seventh Council Ward.

== Other activities ==
Berry studied Methodism, and was a member of Epworth Methodist Episcopal church in Tacoma. During the short period of his life in Marion, Illinois, he actively participated in religious work. He was also a member of two fraternal organizations: the Independent Order of Odd Fellows and the Foresters Friendly Society.

== Personal life and death ==
Berry married Lillian M. Ball in Jacksonville, Illinois, in November 1879. They had four children: Preston A., who later worked as a bookkeeper in Cascade Cereal Company; Grace McCune; John W., who later was the agent for Tacoma Grocery Company; and Harry B.

John Berry died on August 13, 1931, in Tacoma, Washington, and was buried in the Tacoma Cemetery.

== See also ==
- Cascade Cereal Company
- Panic of 1893
- Independent Order of Odd Fellows
- Foresters Friendly Society

== Literature cited ==
- "CPI Inflation Calculator", Bureau of Labor Statistics, Washington: United States Department of Labor
- Murphy, John Miller, ed. (November 25, 1887), "Territorial news", The Washington Standard, Olympia: McClatchy, p. 1, ISSN 2379-7339, LCCN sn84022770, OCLC 10580261
- "Weevil in Tacoma wheat", Seattle Post-Intelligencer, Seattle: Leigh S. J. Hunt, p. 2, March 11, 1892, ISSN 2379-7304, LCCN sn83045604, OCLC 9563195
- "Tacoma's extravagant government", Seattle Post-Intelligencer, Seattle: Leigh S. J. Hunt, p. 2, May 28, 1892, ISSN 2379-7304, LCCN sn83045604, OCLC 9563195
- Murphy, John Miller, ed. (July 1, 1892), "Real estate transfers", The Washington Standard, Olympia: McClatchy, p. 2, ISSN 2379-7339, LCCN sn84022770, OCLC 10580261
- "New Incorporations", Seattle Post-Intelligencer, Seattle: Leigh S. J. Hunt, p. 8, August 2, 1892, ISSN 2379-7304, LCCN sn83045604, OCLC 9563195
- "Mills shut down", The Spokane Review, Spokane: Review Pub. Co, p. 7, October 1, 1892, LCCN sn86072024, OCLC 14375325
- "A corporation grip", Seattle Post-Intelligencer, Seattle: Leigh S. J. Hunt, p. 1, April 8, 1893, ISSN 2379-7304, LCCN sn83045604, OCLC 9563195
- "Growing oriental trade", Seattle Post-Intelligencer, Seattle: Leigh S. J. Hunt, p. 8, May 8, 1893, ISSN 2379-7304, LCCN sn83045604, OCLC 9563195
- "Brief Tacoma news", Seattle Post-Intelligencer, Seattle: Leigh S. J. Hunt, p. 1, May 9, 1893, ISSN 2379-7304, LCCN sn83045604, OCLC 9563195
- "Brief Tacoma news", Seattle Post-Intelligencer, Seattle: Leigh S. J. Hunt, p. 2, February 10, 1894, ISSN 2379-7304, LCCN sn83045604, OCLC 9563195
- "Tacoma does nobly", Seattle Post-Intelligencer, Seattle: Leigh S. J. Hunt, p. 1, April 4, 1894, ISSN 2379-7304, LCCN sn83045604, OCLC 9563195
- "Boodleism not dead", Seattle Post-Intelligencer, Seattle: Leigh S. J. Hunt, p. 2, April 21, 1894, ISSN 2379-7304, LCCN sn83045604, OCLC 9563195
- "News Notes", United States Miller and Weather and Crop journal, vol. XIX, no. 12, Milwaukee: U.S. Miller Co., pp. 206–208, December 1, 1894, LCCN 19018914, OCLC 64221818
- "The Bank of Tacoma assigns", Seattle Post-Intelligencer, Seattle: Leigh S. J. Hunt, p. 7, August 20, 1895, ISSN 2379-7304, LCCN sn83045604, OCLC 9563195
- "New Incorporations", Seattle Post-Intelligencer, Seattle: Leigh S. J. Hunt, p. 3, September 8, 1895, ISSN 2379-7304, LCCN sn83045604, OCLC 9563195
- "State Sunday schools", Seattle Post-Intelligencer, Seattle: Leigh S. J. Hunt, p. 7, June 8, 1900, ISSN 2379-7304, LCCN sn83045604, OCLC 9563195
- "Pacific coast", Weekly Modern Miller, vol. 26, no. 16, St. Louis, p. 14, September 22, 1900, OCLC 1114927921
- "Awards for supplies", Seattle Post-Intelligencer, Seattle: Leigh S. J. Hunt, p. 8, October 4, 1900, ISSN 2379-7304, LCCN sn83045604, OCLC 9563195
- "The hum of industry", The West Coast Trade, vol. XII, no. 47, Tacoma: Orno Strong, pp. 21–28, January 1, 1901, LCCN ca07007079, OCLC 56435557
- "Splendid Commercial Growth", The West Coast Trade, vol. XII, no. 47, Tacoma: Orno Strong, p. 28, January 1, 1901, LCCN ca07007079, OCLC 56435557
- "Made awards for supplies", The Spokesman-Review, Spokane: Cowles Company, p. 8, April 3, 1901, ISSN 1064-7317, LCCN sn84024754, OCLC 11102610
- Murphy, John Miller, ed. (April 5, 1901), "Supply contracts awarded", The Washington Standard, Olympia: McClatchy, p. 2, ISSN 2379-7339, LCCN sn84022770, OCLC 10580261
- "Trade Notes", American Elevator and Grain Trade, vol. XXI, no. 1, Chicago: Mitchell Bros. Company, p. 28, July 15, 1902, LCCN 08010668, OCLC 1479810
- Blethen, Alden J., ed. (December 15, 1902), "Washington patents", Seattle Daily Times, Seattle: The Seattle Times Company, p. 1, ISSN 2639-4898, LCCN sn86072007, OCLC 1765328
- Portrait and Biographical Record of Portland and Vicinity Oregon: Containing Original Sketches of many well known Citizens of the Past and Present (PDF), Genealogy collection, Chicago: Chapman Publishing Company, 1903, OCLC 950945396
- "Supplies for State Institutions", The Spokesman-Review, Spokane: Cowles Company, p. 6, April 9, 1903, ISSN 1064-7317, LCCN sn84024754, OCLC 11102610
- Blethen, Alden J., ed. (July 25, 1903), "Fierce fire rages", Seattle Daily Times, Seattle: The Seattle Times Company, p. 10, ISSN 2639-4898, LCCN sn86072007, OCLC 1765328
- "A big fire at Tacoma", Seattle Star, vol. 5, no. 130, Seattle: E. W. Scripps, p. 1, July 25, 1903, ISSN 2159-5577, LCCN sn87093407, OCLC 17285351
- "Blaze at Tacoma", San Juan Islander, Friday Harbor: Culver Bros., p. 3, July 30, 1903, LCCN sn88085190, OCLC 42342745
- "Two Tacoma plants burn", The Spokesman-Review, Spokane: Cowles Company, p. 8, July 30, 1903, ISSN 1064-7317, LCCN sn84024754, OCLC 11102610
- Murphy, John Miller, ed. (July 31, 1903), "Editor notes", The Washington Standard, Olympia: McClatchy, p. 2, ISSN 2379-7339, LCCN sn84022770, OCLC 10580261
- Scripps, Edward, ed. (January 13, 1904), "Year's record of Tacoma fire department", The Tacoma Times, Tacoma: E. W. Scripps Company, p. 4, ISSN 2158-4729, LCCN sn88085187, OCLC 17347623
- Scripps, Edward, ed. (March 8, 1904), "Republican caucus nominations to be voted on at the primaries", The Tacoma Times, Tacoma: E. W. Scripps Company, p. 3, ISSN 2158-4729, LCCN sn88085187, OCLC 17347623
- Sketches of Washingtonians: Containing Brief Histories of Men of the State of Washington Engaged in Professional and Political Life, in Manufacture, Commerce, Finance and Religion; with a Summary of the Cities of the State Containing Upwards of 5,000 Population (PDF), Seattle: Wellington C. Wolfe & Co, 1907, ISBN 9780217994071, LCCN 07003167, OCLC 935118482
- Blethen, Alden J., ed. (March 7, 1908), "Head of milling interests is dead", Seattle Daily Times, Seattle: The Seattle Times Company, p. 3, ISSN 2639-4898, LCCN sn86072007, OCLC 1765328
- Scripps, Edward, ed. (November 8, 1913), "Tacoma business men launch co-operative store in this city", The Tacoma Times, Tacoma: E. W. Scripps Company, p. 8, ISSN 2158-4729, LCCN sn88085187, OCLC 17347623
- "Andrew J. Bell dies", Seattle Daily Times, Seattle: The Seattle Times Company, p. 2, June 25, 1921, ISSN 2639-4898, LCCN sn86072007, OCLC 1765328
- "State firm incorporated", Seattle Daily Times, Seattle: The Seattle Times Company, p. 7, September 3, 1921, ISSN 2639-4898, LCCN sn86072007, OCLC 1765328
- "Pasco couple announce engagement", The Spokesman-Review, Spokane: Cowles Company, p. 17, June 4, 1922, ISSN 1064-7317, LCCN sn84024754, OCLC 11102610
- Beach, Henry C. (1898), Revised charter, amendments and revised ordinances of the City of Tacoma, Washington: Compiled and Revised by Authority City Council, Tacoma: Western Blank Book Co., OCLC 17004469
- Carey, Charles Henry (1922), History of Oregon (PDF), Genealogy collection, Portland: Pioneer Historical Publishing Company, LCCN 22020446, OCLC 210895549
- Clark, F. J. (May 2, 1900), "The Pacific Northwest", The Northwestern Miller, vol. 49, no. 18, Minneapolis: Miller Publishing Co., pp. 1, 849, ISSN 0029-3539, LCCN 44027596, OCLC 1760727
- Hunt, Herbert (1916), Tacoma its history and its builders; a half century of activity, vol. 1, Chicago: S. J. Clarke Publishing Company, LCCN 18005073, OCLC 656923949
- Prosser, William Farrand (1903), Lewis, Edward Gardner (ed.), A history of the Puget Sound country, its resources, its commerce and its people, New York City: Edward Gardner Lewis, LCCN 05013767
