= Phoenix Iron Works =

Phoenix Iron Works may refer to:

== Australia ==
- Phoenix Iron Works, now Tulloch Limited, Rhodes, New South Wales

== United States ==
- Phoenix Iron Works (Phoenixville, Pennsylvania) (1855–1984)
- Phoenix Iron Works (Oakland, California) (founded in 1901)
- Phoenix Iron Works of Hartford, renamed Taylor & Fenn in 1930, Connecticut, United States; see Stackpole, Moore, and Tryon Building
- Phoenix Iron Works, Richmond, Virginia, United States; see Richmond, Virginia
- Phoenix Iron Works (Savannah, Georgia) (founded in 1873)

== United Kingdom ==
- Phoenix Works, Glasgow, Scotland; see Thomas Edington
- Phoenix Iron Works, Phoenix Iron Works parish, Gloucestershire, England

== Ireland ==
- Royal Phoenix Iron Works, Dublin, Ireland; see Seán Heuston Bridge

== See also ==
- Phenix Works, a steel working factory located in Flémalle-Haute, Liege, Belgium
