= Scripps Institute =

Several facilities in La Jolla, California, are named after the Scripps family. Scripps Institute may refer to:

- TSRI is The Scripps Research Institute, established in 1991 for medical and biological research
- Scripps Institution of Oceanography, a division of UC San Diego
