= Albers Brothers Mill =

- U.S. National Register of Historic Places
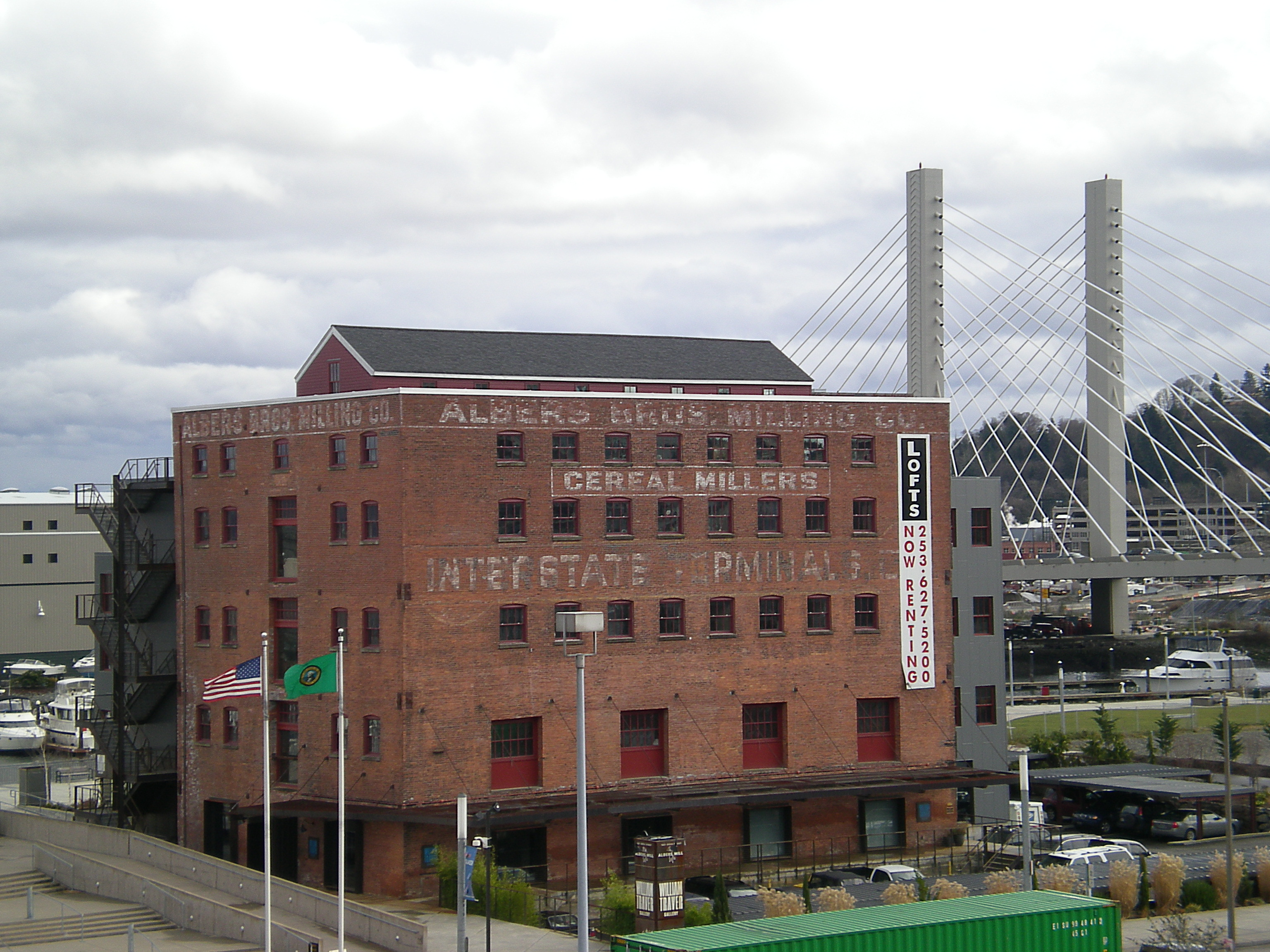
- The Albers Brothers Mill in 2008.

- Location within Washington (state) Location within the United States
- Location: 1821 Dock Street; Tacoma, Washington
- Coordinates: 47°14′42″N 122°26′01″W
- Built: 1905
- Built by: John Huntington
- Architect: J.J. Donnellan
- NRHP reference No.: 02000247
- Added to NRHP: March 19, 2002

The Albers Brothers Mill is a historic mill and contemporary apartment building located in Tacoma, Washington, United States. The building was listed on the National Register of Historic Places in 1984. The structure is owned by the Foss Waterway Development Authority. The building, located at 1821 Dock Street, is the only remaining remnant of the working waterfront on the western shore of the Thea Foss Waterway. With the entrance of viable railroad lines into the Puget Sound basin, trade and commerce with Asia and the Pacific Rim ports shifted northward. Albers Brothers Milling Company’s move from Portland, reflects this change. The company started in Portland and became a primary company in the grain industry with its mills in Tacoma, Seattle and Bellingham on Puget Sound. The Albers Milling Company’s headquarters moved to Tacoma to support its Washington operations.

== History ==
Bernard Albers was born in Lingen, Germany, on March 6, 1864. His father Johann was a grain merchant and young Bernard was apprenticed in the grain marketing business. In 1887 he immigrated to New York. After spending two years in Terre Haute, Indiana he migrated to Portland, Oregon. He worked for four years for feed merchants, Rogge & Storp. In 1893, Albers left Rogge & Storp and established his own grain business as Albers & Tuke. He replaced his partner in 1895 and changed the company name to Albers & Schneider. About this time, Bernard's brothers, Henry and William, emigrated from Germany. Shortly after his two other brothers, George and Frank, joined them.

Together the five brothers increased business, requiring a larger mill. In 1898, they built a new building on the banks of the Willamette River in Portland. The company eventually controlled 600 feet (180 m) of waterfront warehouse and shipping docks. The facility handled shipping, bagging, and milling for grain as well as feed, hay and silage for importation and export, from its position on both rail and maritime routes. Simultaneously (1898), major contracts with the American military in the Philippines as the Spanish American War began, supporting the expansion of the business. These government contracts were in addition to the demands for flour, sacked grain and pancake mix to gold seekers headed to the Klondike in 1897 and 1898. For decades a familiar pictorial label used by Albers depicted a miner bent over his gold pan placer mining a creek.

In 1901 the business was incorporated as the Albers Brothers Milling Company. Within a year a massive expansion period began and continued through the First World War. In 1903, Frank Albers announced that the grain and cereal manufacturing company was expanding with a new mill on Tacoma's waterfront. The Albers Brothers bought the Cascade Cereal Company that had operated a mill on the waterfront since 1889. The Portland mill site was not adequate for expansion. With the dredging of Thea Foss Waterway, the Tacoma location could be expanded to meet the company's needs and it provided a more accessible port for trans-Pacific shipping. The Cascade Cereal site was vacant due to a fire in 1902 which reduced the wood-framed mill and warehouse to cinders.

== See also ==
- National Register of Historic Places listings in Pierce County, Washington

== Bibliography ==
- Bonney, William P. History of Pierce County, Washington. Pioneer Publishing Company, Chicago. (1927).
- The City of Tacoma. "Community Cultural Resource Survey—Albers Bros. Milling.* Company." Office of Historic Preservation. (1981).
- Gaston, Joseph. Portland, Oregon: Its History and Builders, Vol. in. Chicago and Portland: S. J. Clarke Publishing Company. (1911).
- Heritage Investment Corp. "National Registry of Historic Places—Albers Brothers Milling Company Portland, OR." (1984, September 19).
- Hunt, Herbert. Tacoma Its History and Its Builders. S.J. Clarke Publishing Company, Chicago. (1916).
- MacColl, E. Kimbark. The Growth of a City: Power and Politics in Portland, Oregon 1915-1950. Portland. The Georgian Press. (1979).
- Nestle Corporation. "Albers History." http://www.verybestbaking.com/brands/albers history.asp. (2001, June 25).
