= Hallock–McMillan Building =

Building in Portland, Oregon, U.S.

- Hallock & McMillan Building
- U.S. Historic district – Contributing property
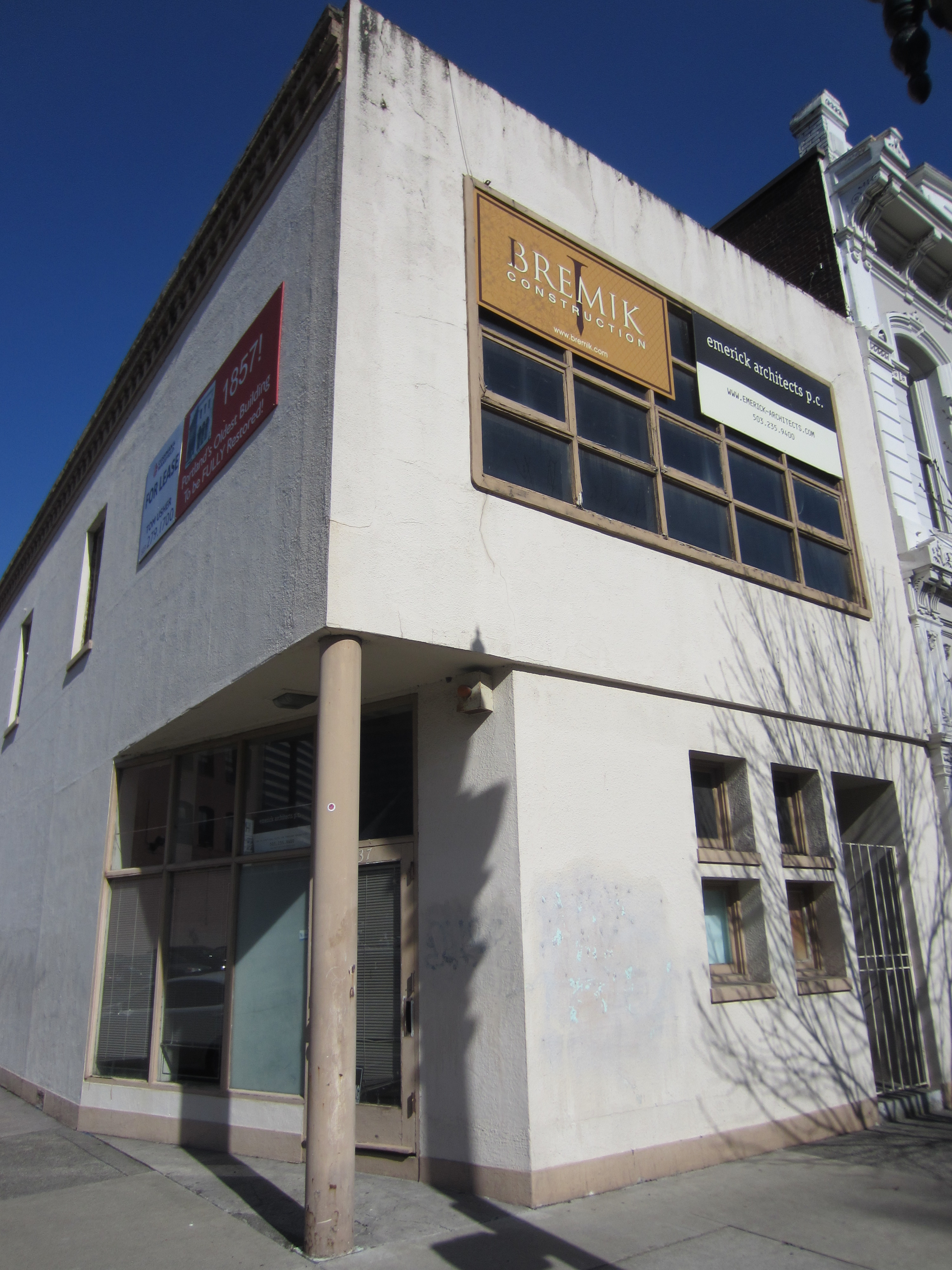
- Exterior of the building in 2014

- Location within Portland, Oregon
- Location: 237 SW Naito Parkway, Portland, Oregon
- Coordinates: 45°31′13.1″N 122°40′16.8″W
- Built: 1857
- Architect: Absalom Hallock; Phoenix Iron Works
- Architectural style: originally Italianate
- Part of: Portland Skidmore/Old Town Historic District (ID75001597)
- Designated CP: December 5, 1975

The Hallock–McMillan Building, also known as the Hallock and McMillan Building, is the first and oldest commercial brick building in Portland, Oregon, located downtown at 237 SW Naito Parkway. The building was designed by Absalom Hallock and completed in 1857. It is adjacent to the Fechheimer & White Building. In 1975, it was listed as a "primary landmark" in the National Register of Historic Places (NRHP) nomination of the Portland Skidmore/Old Town Historic District, the building's designation subsequently "translated" to "contributing property" under post-1970s NRHP terminology.

== Description and history ==
Built in 1857, the Hallock–McMillan Building is downtown Portland's first and oldest commercial brick building, according to the Architectural Heritage Center, a preservation advocacy non-profit organization. The building was designed by Absalom Hallock, the "city's first architect", on behalf of the San Francisco Bay Area's Phoenix Iron Works.

In 2010, Portland developer John Russell purchased the building for $700,000. In 2019, under Russell's ownership, the Hallock-McMillan building underwent a renovation to restore the historic façade. Cast iron reproductions of pilasters, arches, and cartouches were created to enhance the façade’s historical accuracy. The renovation's scope also included a seismic upgrade by constructing a concealed cast-in-place frame behind the building. The renovation won the 2020 Restore Oregon Demuro Award.
