= Lechon (restaurant) =

Restaurant in Portland, Oregon, U.S.

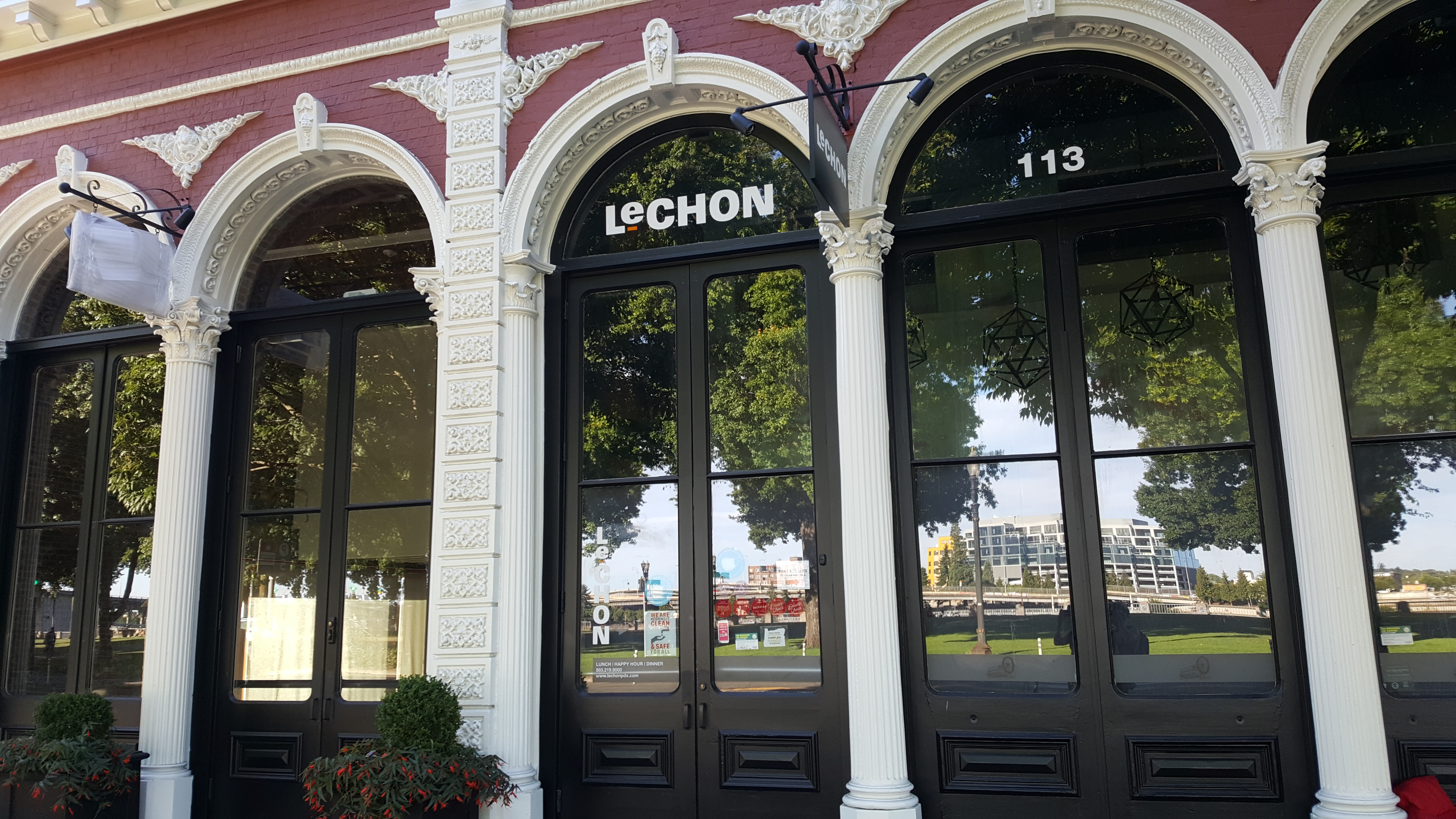
- The restaurant's exterior in 2020
- Interactive map of Lechon

Restaurant information
- Food type: Argentine; Chilean
- Location: 113 SW Naito Parkway, Portland, Multnomah, Oregon, 97204, United States
- Coordinates: 45.5213°N 122.6707°W
- Website: lechonpdx.com

Lechon (or LeChon) is a South American restaurant in Portland, Oregon's Old Town Chinatown neighborhood, in the United States. Jaco Smith opened the restaurant, which serves Argentine and Chilean cuisine, in August 2015.

== Description ==
Lechon is housed in the Smith's Block building, built in 1872, along Southwest Naito Parkway. Michael Russell of The Oregonian described the menu as "global, with identifiably South American dishes -- fried empanadas, crab-stuffed piquillo peppers and an Argentine asado with grilled meats and sweetbreads -- alongside more Northwest-y bistro fare -- foie gras torchon with cherry mostarda, forest mushrooms and a farm egg on toasted brioche". The restaurant also has vegetarian options.

== History ==
In 2018, the restaurant was featured in the "Flavor Fiesta!" episode of the sixteenth season of the Travel Channel's series Food Paradise.

== Reception ==
The business was included in Eater Portland's 2022 overview of "Where to Eat and Drink in Downtown Portland". Lechon ranked third in the happy hour category of The Oregonian's Readers Choice Awards in 2025.

== See also ==
- Hispanics and Latinos in Portland, Oregon
