= Oriental Consolidated Mining Company =

1897–1939 American mining company in Korea

The Oriental Consolidated Mining Company (OCMC) was an American mining firm that operated between 1897 and 1939 in the Korean Empire and then Korea under Japanese rule.

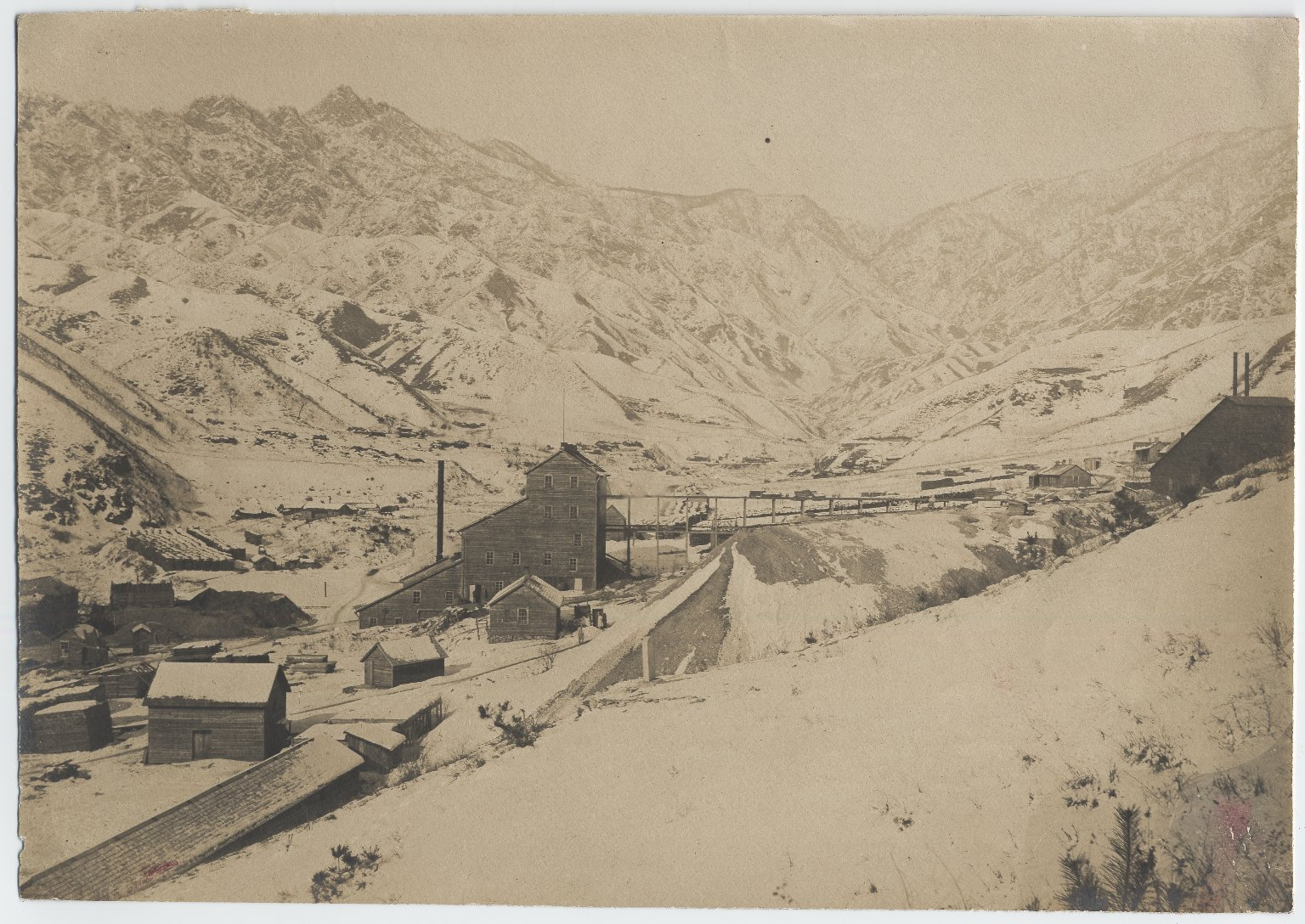
The Tabowie mining camp in winter, c. 1908.

== History ==
The Joseon–United States Treaty of 1882 marked the first establishment of relations between those two countries. American diplomat Horace Newton Allen advised the Korean King Gojong to take a loan from the U.S., using several mines in Korea as collateral. In 1887, Allen facilitated negotiations for American mining rights in Korea. To this end, he brought in American businessman James R. Morse, who eventually acquired mining rights in Unsan County in August 1895. Morse received the rights to mine for 25 years, untaxed. In return, 25% stake in the company was to go to Gojong. However, Morse was unable to procure investments for the mining business.

In 1897, American businessman Leigh S. J. Hunt founded the Oriental Consolidated Mining Company in West Virginia, United States. In 1897, Morse sold Hunt the rights to the Unsan mine for $30,000. In 1899, OCMC bought out Gojong's stake in the company for $100,000 and the requirement that they pay annual taxes of 25,000 won.

The company mined around $56 million in gold with a net profit of around $15 million. Upon the conclusion of the mining contract in 1939, the company was sold to Japanese company Nihon Kogyō Kabushiki Kaisha (Nippon Mining Co., Ltd.; predecessor to Nihon Kogyo).

== Additional reading ==
- Palmer, Spencer J. (1962). "American Gold Mining in Korea's Unsan District". Pacific Historical Review. 31 (4): 379–391. doi:10.2307/3636264. ISSN 0030-8684.
- Rand, Laurance B. (1989). High Stakes: The Life and Times of Leigh S.J. Hunt. New York: Peter Lang. ISBN 978-0-8204-0992-4.
