= The Tacoma Times =

Defunct American newspaper

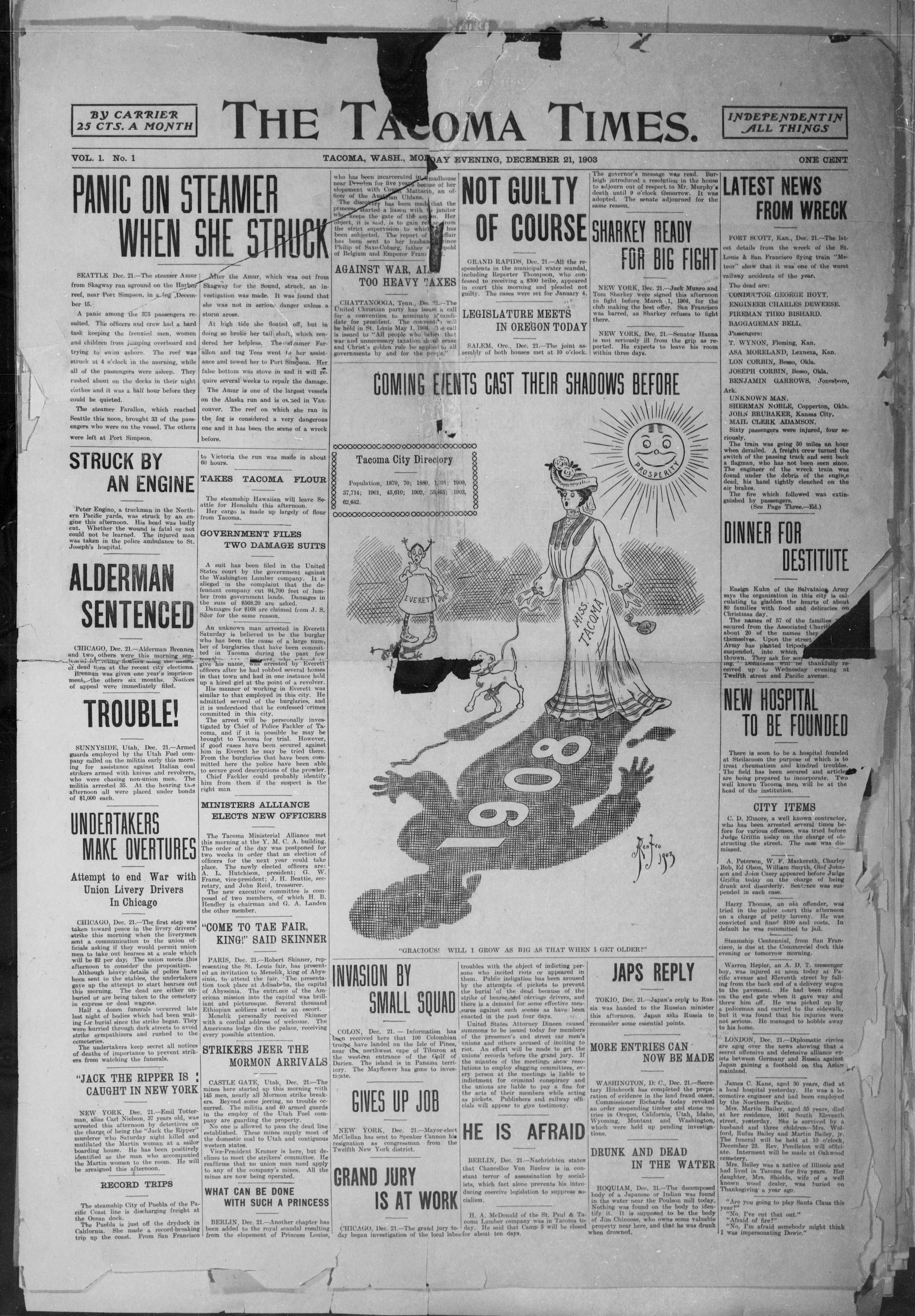
- The front page of the first edition of the Tacoma Times
- Type: Daily newspaper
- Founder: E.W. Scripps
- Founded: 1903
- Ceased publication: 1949
- ISSN: 2158-4729
- OCLC number: 17347623

The Tacoma Times was a newspaper published in Tacoma, Washington from 1903 to 1949. It was founded by E. W. Scripps, with editorial personnel taken from the Seattle Star.
