= Fechheimer & White Building =

Building in Portland, Oregon, U.S.

- U.S. Historic district – Contributing property
- Portland Historic Landmark
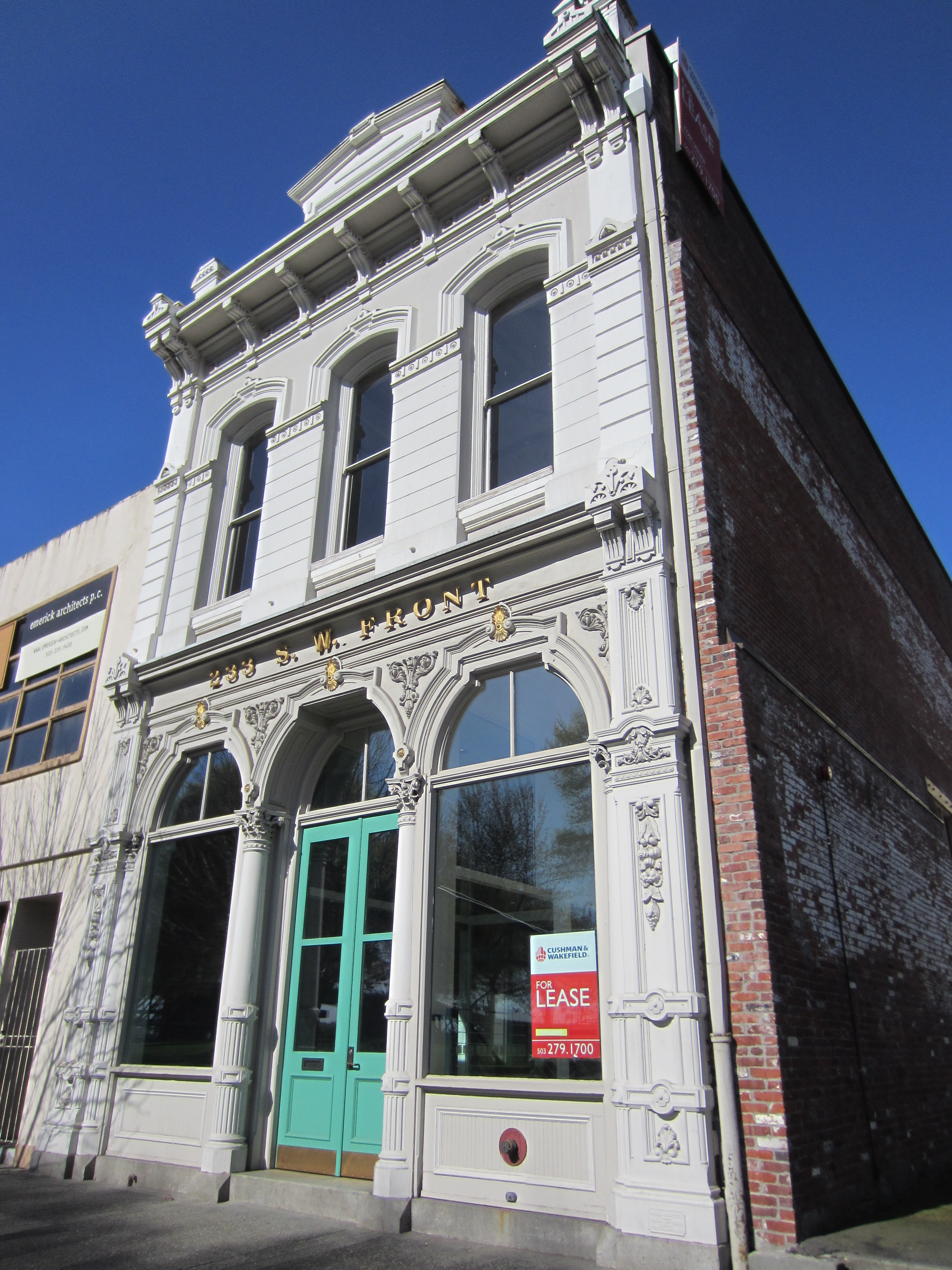
- The building's front exterior in 2014

- Location within Portland, Oregon
- Location: 233 SW Naito Parkway, Portland, Oregon
- Coordinates: 45°31′13.44″N 122°40′17″W
- Built: 1885
- Part of: Portland Skidmore/Old Town Historic District (ID75001597)
- Designated CP: December 5, 1975

The Fechheimer & White Building is a historic building located at 233 SW Naito Parkway in Portland, Oregon. Designed by an unknown architect, it was built in 1885 and features cast-iron by Willamette Iron Works. It is adjacent to the Hallock–McMillan Building. In 1975, it was listed as a "primary landmark" in the National Register of Historic Places (NRHP) nomination of the Portland Skidmore/Old Town Historic District, the building's designation subsequently "translated" to "contributing property" under post-1970s NRHP terminology. The building's year of construction has been given alternatively as 1870, as opposed to 1885. (The National Historic Landmark nomination form for the Skidmore/Old Town Historic District uses both dates for the building, in separate sections, without explanation – an inconsistency.)
