= Stackpole, Moore, and Tryon Building =

- U.S. National Register of Historic Places
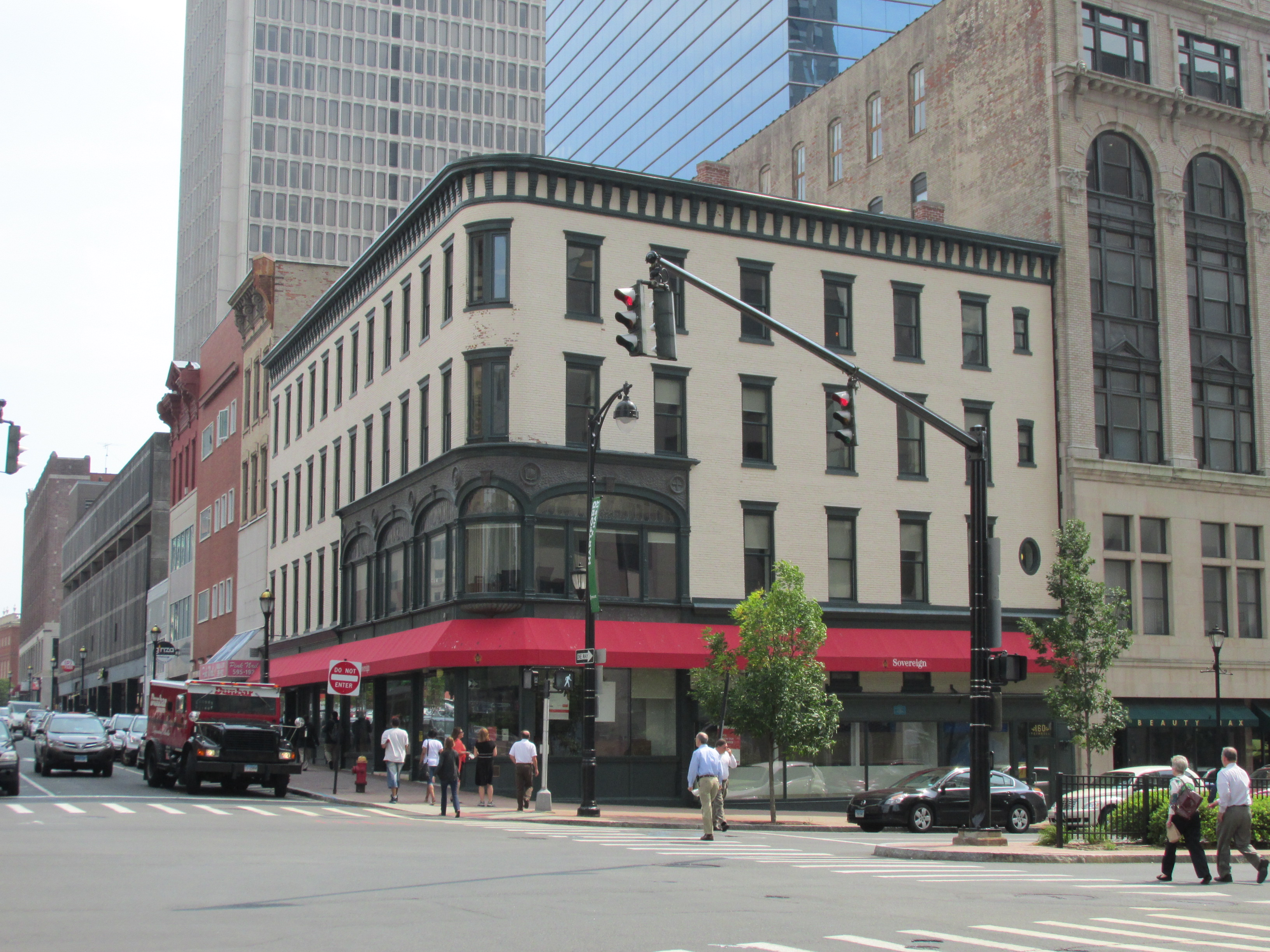

- Location within Connecticut Location within the United States
- Location: 105-115 Asylum Street, Hartford, Connecticut
- Coordinates: 41°46′0″N 72°40′33″W
- Area: less than one acre
- Built: 1896
- Architect: Isaac A. Allen Jr.
- NRHP reference No.: 78002869
- Added to NRHP: October 19, 1978

The Stackpole, Moore, and Tryon Building is a historic commercial building at 105-115 Asylum Street in Downtown Hartford, Connecticut. Built in the mid-19th century, and extensively altered in 1896, it is a good local example of a period building with a Beaux Arts cast-iron facade. It was listed on the National Register of Historic Places in 1978.

== Description and history ==
The Stackpole, Moore, and Tryon Building is located on the South Side of Hartford's Downtown area, at the Southeast Corner of Asylum Avenue and Trumbull Street. It is a timber-framed structure with a mainly brick exterior. It is covered by a flat roof with a projecting bracketed cornice, and has a rounded corner featuring curved windows. Most upper-floor windows are set in rectangular openings with brownstone sills and lintels, but a grouping of windows around the building corner have been replaced by a cast-iron facade with large picture windows. The ground-floor storefronts have largely been modernized, although elements of the cast-iron facade are also evident there.

The building's exact construction date is unknown, but is believed to be mid-19th century. Its present appearance dates to a major renovation conducted in 1896 under the auspices of architect Isaac A. Allen Jr. The cast iron facade elements were provisioned at that time by the Phoenix Iron Works of Hartford, which also supplied elements for the Connecticut State House and buildings at Trinity College. The building was for many years home to a clothing retailer, known for most of the 20th century as Stackpole, Moore, and Tryon; it presently houses a bank on the ground floor. At the time of the building's listing on the National Register in 1978, it had been in continuous ownership by the same family for more than 120 years.

== See also ==
- National Register of Historic Places listings in Hartford, Connecticut
