= Albers Brothers Milling Company =

Historic building in Portland, Oregon, U.S.

- U.S. National Register of Historic Places
- Portland Historic Landmark
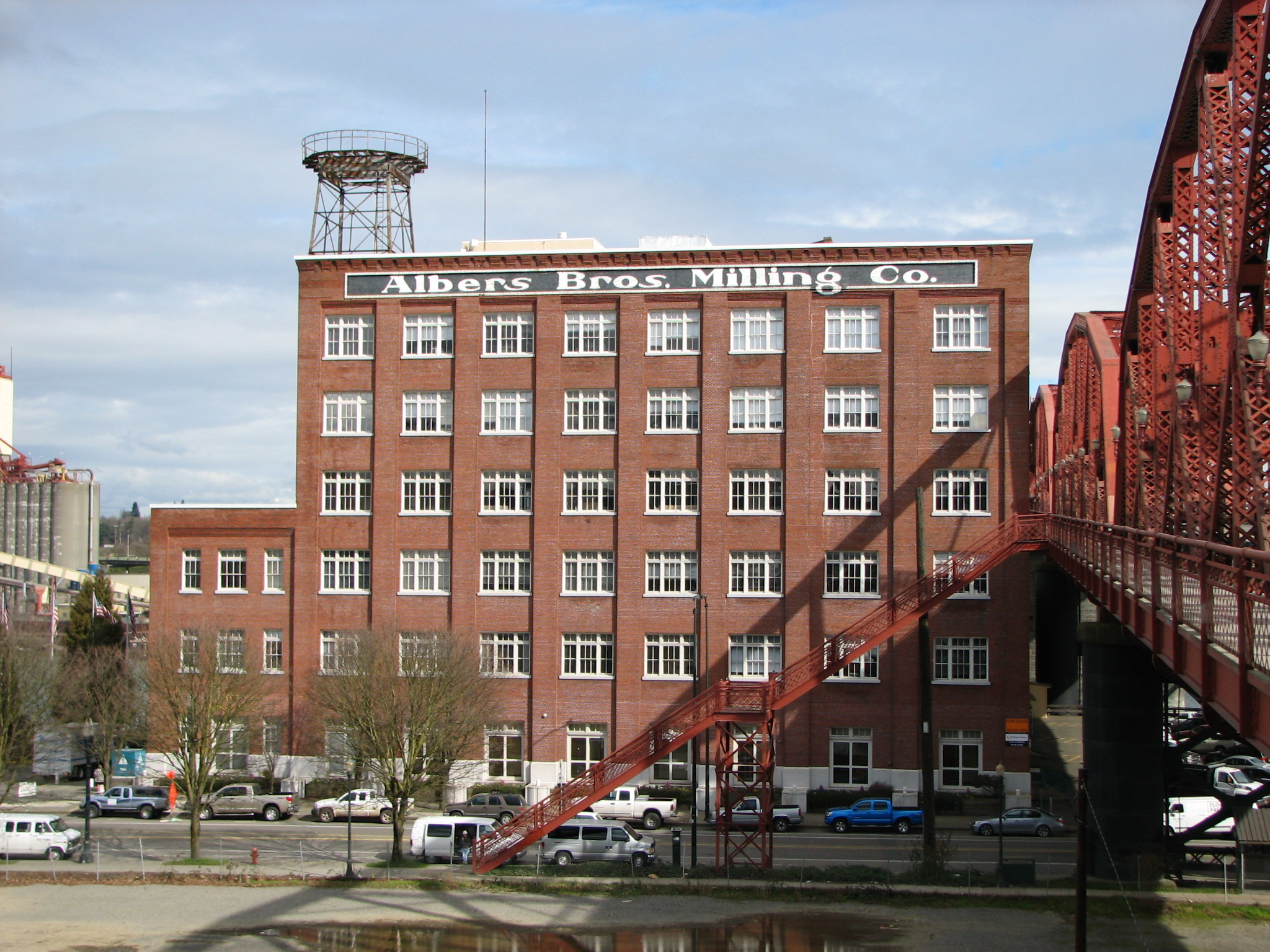
- West elevation of the Albers Brothers Milling Company building in 2008. On the right is the Broadway Bridge.

- Location within Portland, Oregon
- Location: 1118–1130 NW Naito Parkway (formerly Front Ave.); Portland, Oregon
- Coordinates: 45°31′52″N 122°40′34″W
- Built: 1909–1911
- Architectural style: utilitarian
- NRHP reference No.: 84000480
- Added to NRHP: November 15, 1984

The Albers Brothers Milling Company building is a historic mill and contemporary office building located on the banks of the Willamette River in Portland, Oregon, United States. In the early decades of the 20th century, the German-immigrant Albers brothers built the largest flour and feed milling enterprise on the West Coast, headquartered in Portland and comprising operations in four states. This combined milling, warehousing, shipping, and office facility, built in 1909–1911, is the oldest remaining flour or feed mill in the city. The silos built into the south elevation of the building are painted with representations some of the mill's products as advertisements.

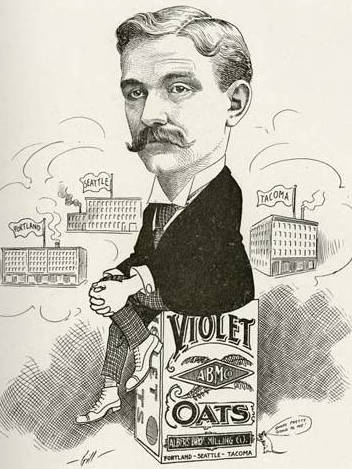
George Albers in 1906

The building was listed on the National Register of Historic Places in 1984. It was unoccupied at that time, as the milling company had already left. It was converted into an office building in 1989.

Albers was also well known in the San Francisco Bay Area for its prominent grain elevator and neon sign located at the foot of the ferry pier ("Oakland Mole", "Mole") of the Southern Pacific in Oakland, now the site of the Port of Oakland container ship facilities.

== See also ==
- National Register of Historic Places listings in Northwest Portland, Oregon
