= Smith's Block =

Building in Portland, Oregon, U.S.

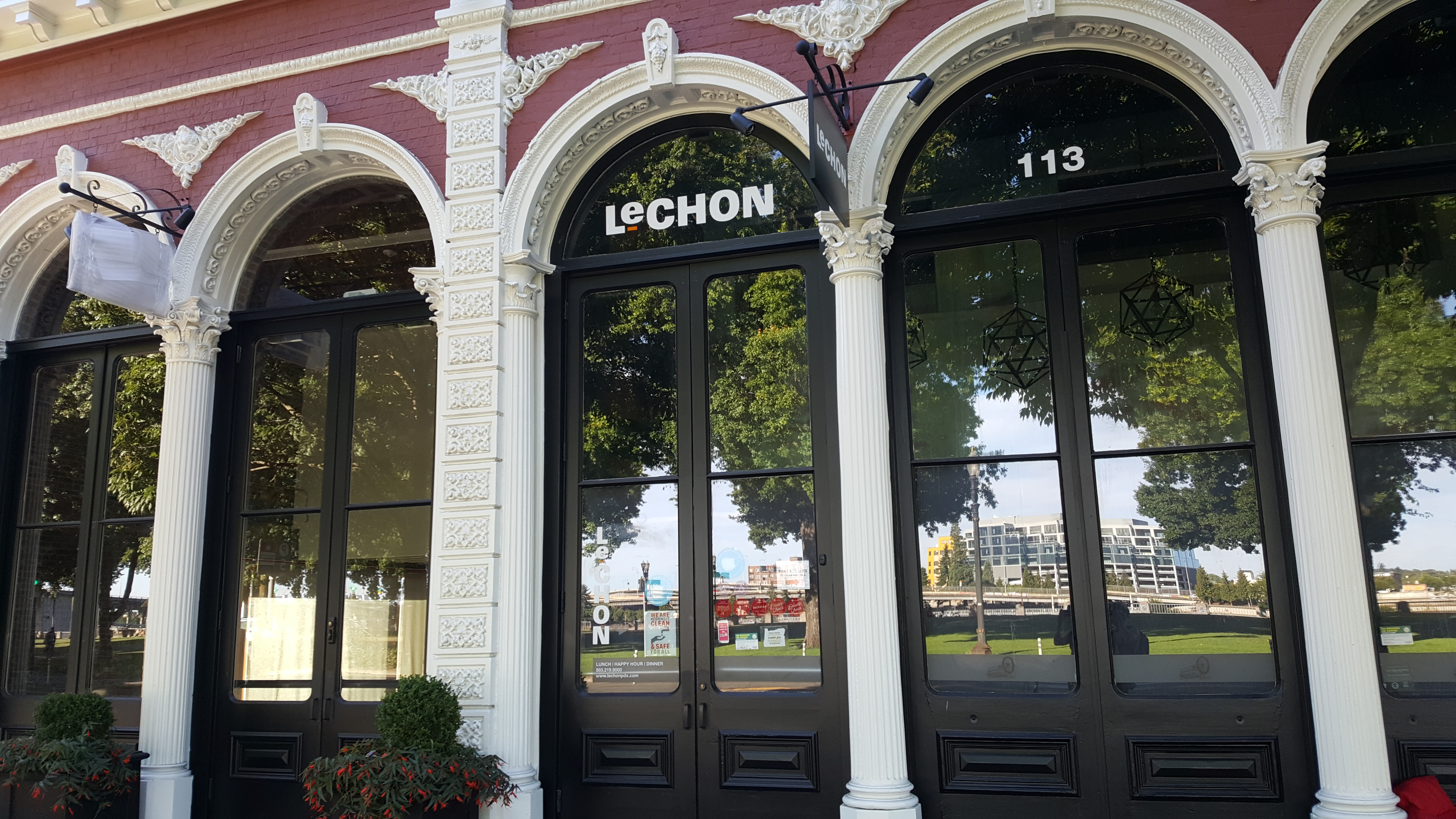
- Exterior of the restaurant Lechon, which is housed in Smith's Block, in 2020

General information
- Location: Portland, Oregon, United States
- Coordinates: 45°31′16.8″N 122°40′15.3″W

Smith's Block, or Smith Block, is an historic building in Portland, Oregon's Old Town Chinatown, in the United States. The 24,000 square-foot structure was completed in 1872 for $50,000. Designed by W.W. Piper, the building exhibits Italianate architecture and has been designated a Portland Historic Landmark. It houses the restaurant Lechon.
