= Leigh S. J. Hunt =

American businessman

Leigh S.J. Hunt
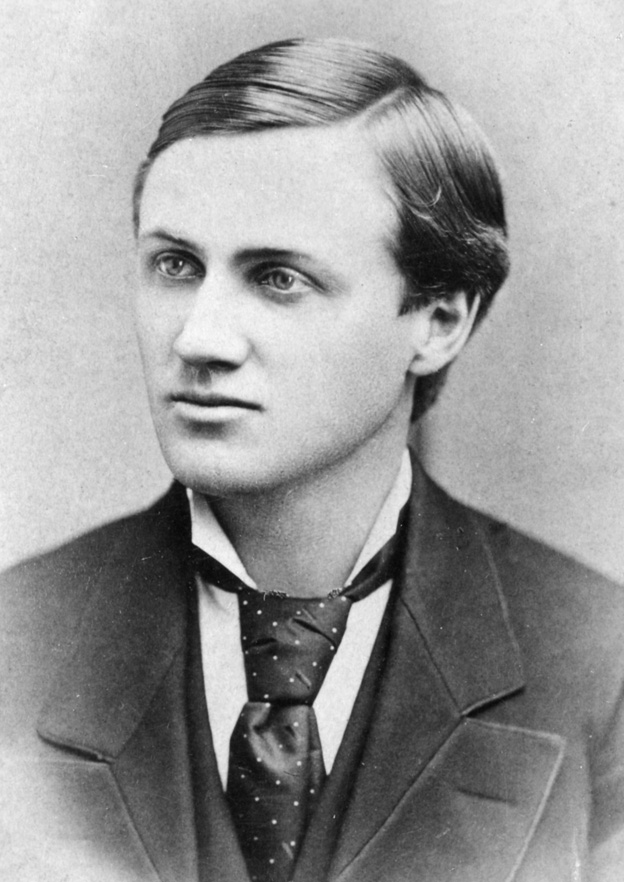
- Hunt, circa 1885
- Born: Smith James Hunt; August 11, 1855; Columbia City, Indiana
- Died: October 5, 1933 (aged 78); Las Vegas, Nevada
- Spouse: Jessie Noble (m. 1885)
- Children: 2

Leigh Smith James Hunt (born Smith James Hunt; August 11, 1855 – October 5, 1933) was an American businessman. He is best known as the third president of Iowa State University (1885–1886), as publisher of the Seattle Post-Intelligencer (1886–1893), and as founder and owner of the Oriental Consolidated Mining Company in Korea (1897–1903). He later operated a cotton plantation in Sudan until 1910. The community of Hunts Point, Washington bears his name.

== Biography ==
=== Early life and education ===
Smith James Hunt was born on a farm near Columbia City, Indiana, on August 11, 1855. His parents, Franklin and Martha (Long) Hunt, were natives of the same state. Hunt earned an undergraduate degree from Middlebury College via correspondence course and studied law on his own before passing the Indiana bar exam. In 1878, Hunt began to go by the name "Leigh," likely in reference to noted poet Leigh Hunt.

=== Career ===
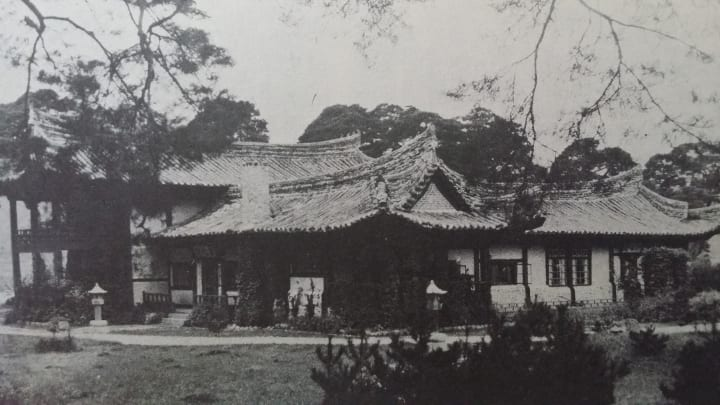
Hunt's house in Unsan, Korea circa 1900

After completing his education in 1879 he went to Cedar Falls, Iowa, and engaged in teaching school, subsequently becoming Principal. There he established his reputation as an educator, and some time later he was engaged as Superintendent of the Schools at Mount Pleasant, Iowa (1880) and Des Moines, Iowa (1882) and still later as President of the State Agricultural College at Ames, Iowa (now the Iowa State University).

In 1886, he moved to Seattle and purchased the Seattle Post-Intelligencer. In 1887 he became involved in the failed Great Western Iron and Steel Company venture initiated by Peter Kirk, in turn becoming a co-founder of the city of Kirkland. By 1888 he had moved into a mansion on his estate at Yarrow Point, which he named for William Wordsworth's Yarrow poems. Upon discovery that the view of the Olympic Mountains was obscured by the trees on the adjoining point, today's Hunts Point, he purchased it and cleared 10 acres (4.0 ha).

Tied up in the failed steel venture in Kirkland, Hunt lost much of his fortune during the Panic of 1893 and was forced to sell the paper in 1894. His later career included real estate development, operating gold mines in Unsan County, Korea under the Oriental Consolidated Mining Company, growing cotton in Sudan (1904–1910), and mining and land development in Las Vegas, Nevada. The Huntridge neighborhood in Las Vegas was developed on land that was his farm.

=== Marriage and children ===
Hunt and his wife Jessie Noble Hunt (c. 1862–1960) were married in 1885 and had two children:

- Henry Leigh Hunt (1886–1972), 1st husband (1925–1930s) of Louise Lévêque de Vilmorin (1902–1969), French novelist and seed heiress. They had three daughters: Jessie, Alexandra, and Helena. Hunt would serve as Honorary Consul of Monaco in Las Vegas (1956–1963).
- Helen Hunt Rives (1893–1996)

Academic offices
Preceded by Seaman A. Knapp	President of Iowa State University; 1885-86	Succeeded by William I. Chamberlain
