= Phoenix Iron Works (Oakland, California) =

Foundry

The Phoenix Iron Works is a foundry in Oakland, California. Phoenix Iron Works has been a major supplier of manhole covers and street gutter gratings.

== History ==
Phoenix Iron Works was founded in 1901 by William Russell in Oakland, California.
