= The Seattle Star =

Daily newspaper (1899–1947)

Seattle Daily Star
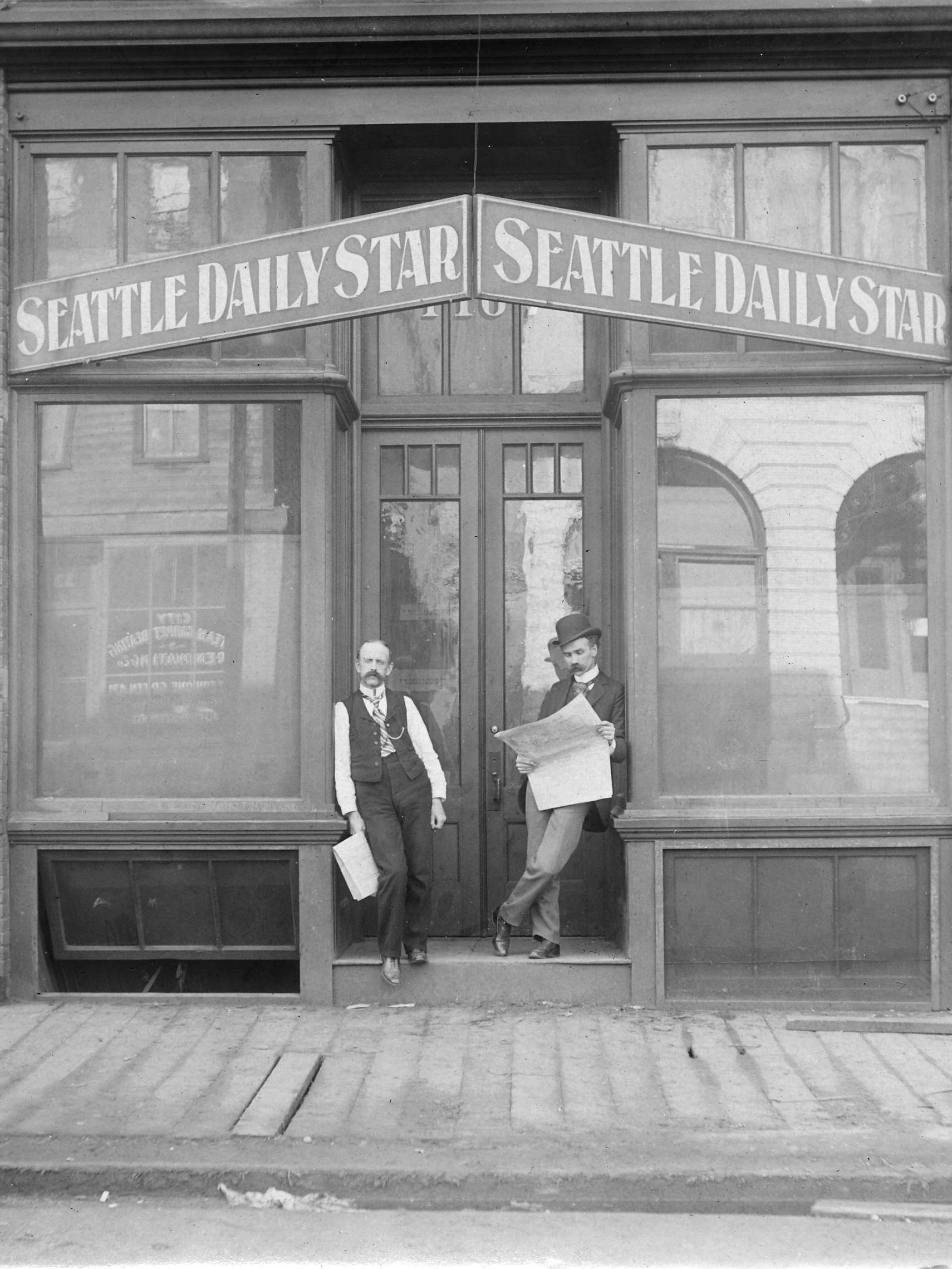
- Seattle Daily Star newspaper office, circa 1900
- Type: Daily newspaper
- Format: Broadsheet
- Founder: Edward Willis
- Publisher: E.H. Wells & Co.
- Founded: Feb 2, 1899
- Ceased publication: 1947
- Language: English
- Country: United States
- ISSN: 2159-5577
- OCLC number: 17285351

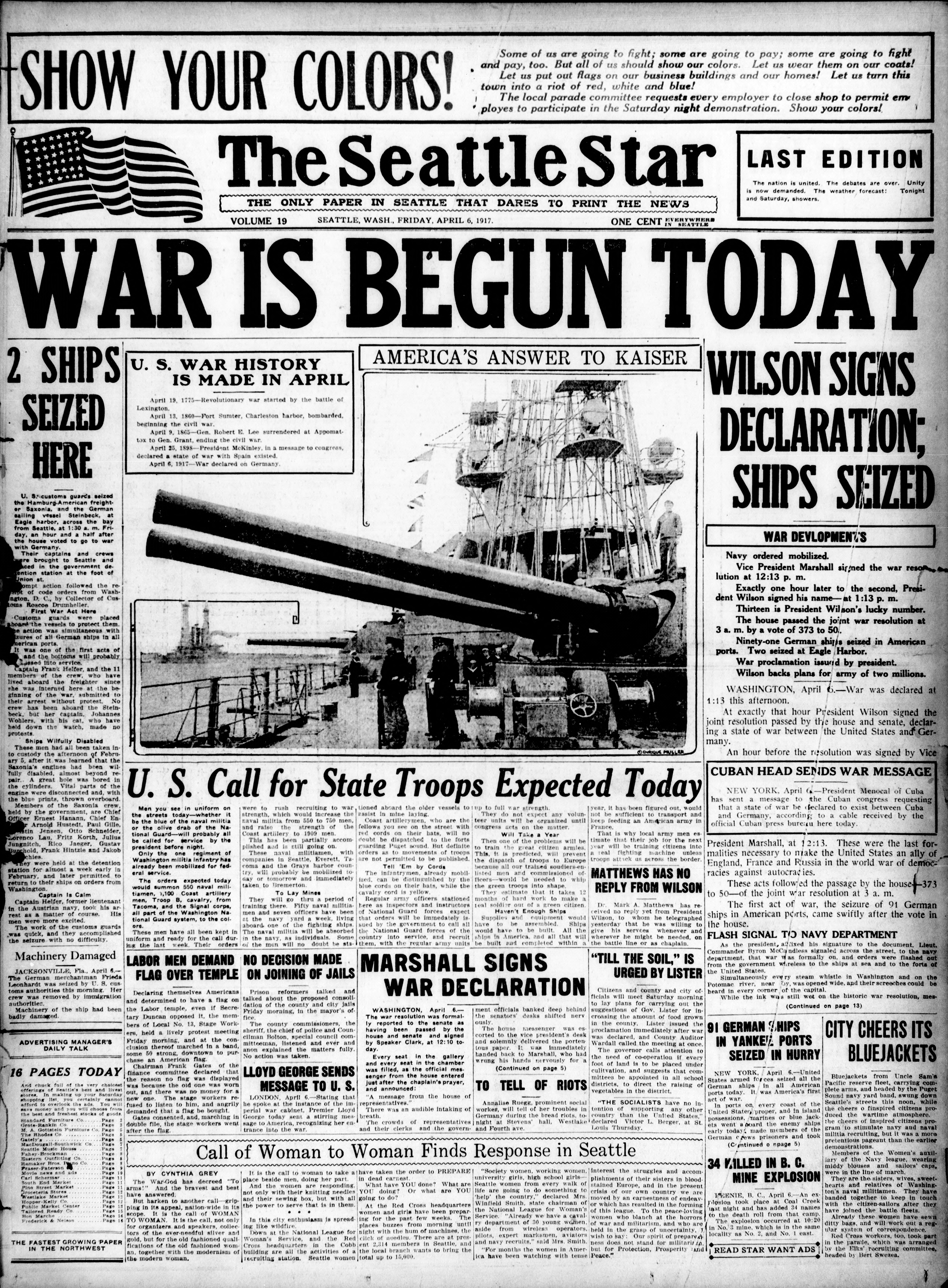
Front page of the April 6, 1917, issue of The Seattle Star, announcing the United States' entrance into World War I

The Seattle Star was a daily newspaper that ran from February 25, 1899, to August 13, 1947.

== History ==
The Star was owned by E. W. Scripps and in 1920 was transferred to Scripps McRae League of Newspapers (later Scripps-Canfield League), after a falling-out within the Scripps family. The company, which eventually became Scripps League Newspapers, Inc., owned the paper until 1942, when it was sold to a group of local Seattle businessmen including Howard Parrish, its publisher. Soon after the sale, it reverted to its previous broadsheet format after having been a tabloid for a short time. Of the three Seattle general circulation dailies (Seattle Post-Intelligencer and The Seattle Times being the other two), it was the smallest in circulation, although it had been the largest paper in the city around 1900.

For most of its life the paper was known as the "working man's" or "working person's" paper. It was staunchly pro-labor, reflecting the values of E.W. Scripps. In 1919, it became vehemently anti-Japanese, especially toward Japanese-Americans who lived in its vicinity.

After World War II, all of its assets minus the building and machinery were sold to The Seattle Times for $360,000 in 1947. Management said the sale was needed because of the rising labor costs and the newsprint shortage.

== Sources ==
- The Seattle Star, 1899–1947, Seattle Public Library. As of January 2023, online archive includes issues from shortly after the newspapers founding, through 1925.
- Casserly, Jack: Scripps the Divided Dynasty. Donald I. Fine, Inc. 1993.
