= E. W. Scripps (businessman) =

American newspaper publisher (1854–1926)

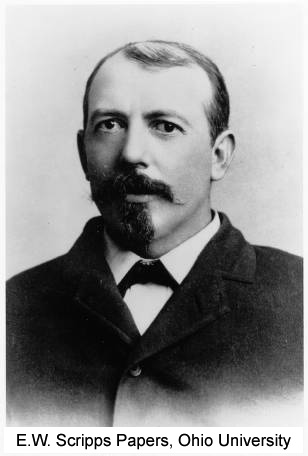
- A newspaper image of E. W. Scripps, c. 1912
- Born: Edward Willis Scripps; June 18, 1854; Rushville, Illinois, U.S.
- Died: March 12, 1926 (aged 71); Monrovia, Liberia
- Occupations: Publisher, publishing magnate
- Years active: 1878–1926
- Known for: Founder of The E. W. Scripps Company, (1878); Scripps Institution of Oceanography, (1907); United Press International, (1908; later known as "UPI News Service") "Science Service", (1921; later known as "Society for Science & the Public")
- Spouse: Nackie Benson Holtsinger
- Children: 6
- Relatives: James E. Scripps, (1835–1906; half-brother); Ellen Browning Scripps, (1836–1932; half-sister); Samuel H. Scripps, (1927–2007; grandson)

Edward Willis Scripps (June 18, 1854 – March 12, 1926) was an American newspaper publisher. He and his sister Ellen Browning Scripps founded the E. W. Scripps Company, today a diversified media conglomerate, as well as the United Press news service (which became United Press International (UPI) when International News Service (INS) merged with United Press in 1958). The E. W. Scripps School of Journalism at Ohio University is named for him.

== Early life ==
E. W. Scripps was born and raised in Rushville, Illinois, to James Mogg Scripps from London, and Julia Adeline Osborne (third wife) from New York.

E. W., as with many businessmen of his day, went by his initials rather than writing out his first and middle name. He often signed his middle name as "Wyllis".

E. W. was a prolific consumer of whisky and cigars, according to his confidential assistant Gilson Gardner, and was said to drink a gallon (3.79 L) each day while bearing a lit cigar at all waking hours.

== Newspaper career ==
Both E. W. and his half-sister Ellen worked with his older half-brother, James when he founded The Detroit News in 1873. E. W. started as an office boy at the paper. In 1878, with loans from his half-brothers, E. W. went on to found The Penny Press (later the Cleveland Press) in Cleveland. With financial support from sister Ellen, he went on to begin or acquire some 25 newspapers. This was the beginning of a media empire that is now the E. W. Scripps Company.

In 1907, Scripps created United Press Associations, now United Press International (UPI), from smaller regional news services. Scripps later said "I regard my life's greatest service to the people of this country to be the creation of the United Press", to provide competition to the Associated Press.

Scripps believed in editorial independence, stating:

A newspaper fairly and honestly conducted in the interests of the great masses of the public must at all times antagonize the selfish interests of that very class [the advertisers] which furnishes the larger part of a newspaper's income. It must occasionally so antagonize this class as to cause it not only to cease patronage, to a greater or lesser extent, but to make actually offensive warfare against the newspaper.

== Later life ==
In 1898, he finished building a home in San Diego, where his half-sister lived nearby, thinking that the dry, warm climate would help his lifelong allergic rhinitis. He built it as a winter home to escape the cold of West Chester (Butler County), Ohio, but eventually lived there year-round, and conducted his newspaper business from the ranch. His ranch encompassed what is today the community of Scripps Ranch as well as Marine Corps Air Station Miramar.

In 1903, he and his half-sister Ellen were the founding donors of Scripps Institution of Oceanography. Initially, Scripps was reluctant to support the venture, thinking scientists could not be businesslike. However, he developed a deep friendship with the scientific director, William Emerson Ritter, and together they began to plan projects for the institute. As the Institute started to succeed, he became an enthusiastic supporter and took a great interest in its work.

In 1921, Scripps founded Science Service, later named the Society for Science & the Public, with the goal of keeping the public informed of scientific achievements. Scripps College is also named in honor of his half-sister, Ellen Browning Scripps, because a large part of its endowment derives from the media fortune they had built.

== Death and legacy ==
Scripps died at the age of 71 on March 12, 1926, onboard his yacht Ohio as it lay anchored in Monrovia Bay, Liberia.

Among his descendants was Charles E. Scripps (1920 – 2007), chairman of the board of the E. W. Scripps Company, under whose leadership the company was transformed from a family-owned newspaper publisher into a major publicly traded media company with major cable television operations.

1976, Scripps was posthumously inducted into the California Newspaper Hall of Fame.

== See also ==
- Samuel H. Scripps – E. W. Scripps' grandson, a philanthropist in theater and dance
- The Day Book – E. W. Scripps' six year experiment in ad-free journalism
