= Sean Carlson =

Sean Carlson may refer to:

- Sean Carlson (politician)
- Sean Carlson (music promoter)
