= Senator Crane (disambiguation) =

Winthrop M. Crane (1853–1920) was a U.S. Senator from Massachusetts from 1904 to 1913. Senator Crane may also refer to:

- Horace O. Crane (1808–1872), Wisconsin State Senate
- Jesse D. Crane (1841–1914), Michigan State Senate
- John Crane (American politician) (born 1973), Indiana State Senate
- Mike Crane (born 1964), Georgia State Senate
- Robert C. Crane (1920–1962), New Jersey State Senate
- Winston Crane (1990–2002), Australian Senate
