= Robert J. MacDonald =

American politician

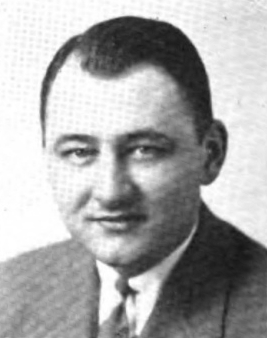
Michigan State Senator Robert J. MacDonald

Robert J. MacDonald (1914-1987) was a politician in the state of Michigan.

== Biography ==
MacDonald was born on April 28, 1914, in Superior, Wisconsin, to Duncan and Cecilia MacDonald He was known to be a member of the Benevolent and Protective Order of Elks, Lions Clubs International, and the Fraternal Order of Eagles. MacDonald died in 1987.

== Career ==
From 1941 to 1944 MacDonald served as a member of the Michigan House of Representatives, where he represented the Genesee County 1st district. Later, he served in the Michigan State Senate from 1945 to 1946, where he represented the 13th district. By trade he was a lawyer, with his office in the historical Paterson Building.
