= The Doctor in War =

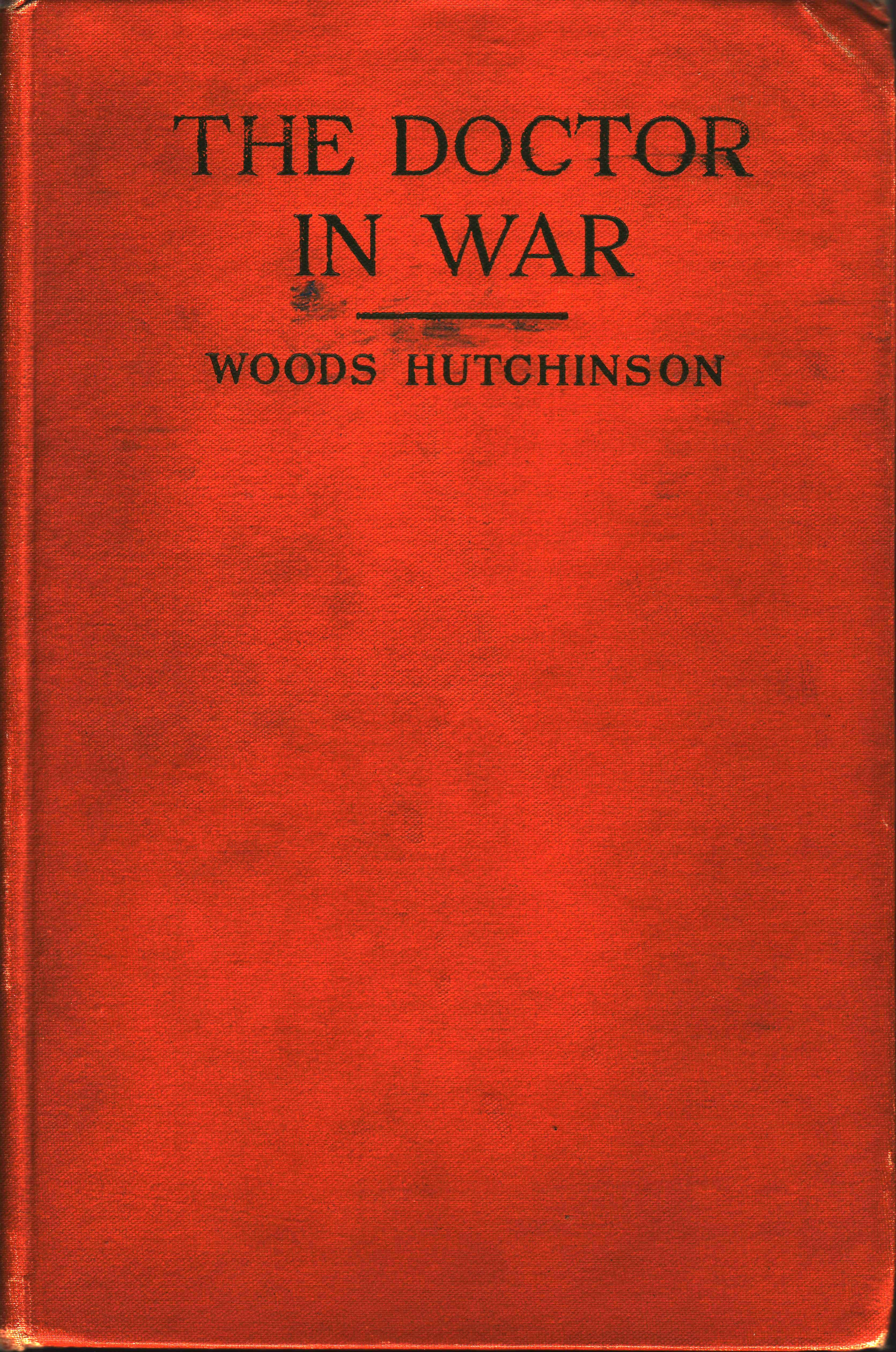
- 1918 cover
- Author: Woods Hutchinson
- Language: English
- Publisher: Houghton Mifflin Company
- Publication date: Nov. 1918
- Publication place: United States
- Media type: Print (Hardcover)
- Pages: 481 pp

The Doctor in War is a book published in November 1918 by Woods Hutchinson, an American physician who travelled throughout Europe from 15 January to 24 December 1917 visiting hospitals, ambulance trains, and other locations to offer his services to the war effort during World War I.

== Background ==
As Hutchinson believed that "the doctor and the sanitarian would play an important part" in the World War, he offered to help the British Army medical staff but was told in order to serve he would have to swear allegiance and in turn lose his American citizenship. With the help of Secretary of War Newton Diehl Baker and Colonel Roosevelt he was able to travel to Europe and see everything that had "any value or interest from a medical and public health point of view."

== Summary ==
Hutchinson emphasizes the importance that doctors played in the war. One of the major things they have contributed is the decrease in deaths due to disease. In the American Civil War the ratio was five deaths to disease for every one in battle, however during 'The Great War' the ratio was changed to ten deaths in battle for every one to disease. Hutchinson believes that three major points contribute to this protection against infectious disease: inoculations and sanitary measures; surgical skill and hospital organization increasing recovery rate; and the better food provided to soldiers.
