= Warren J. Hinkley =

American politician

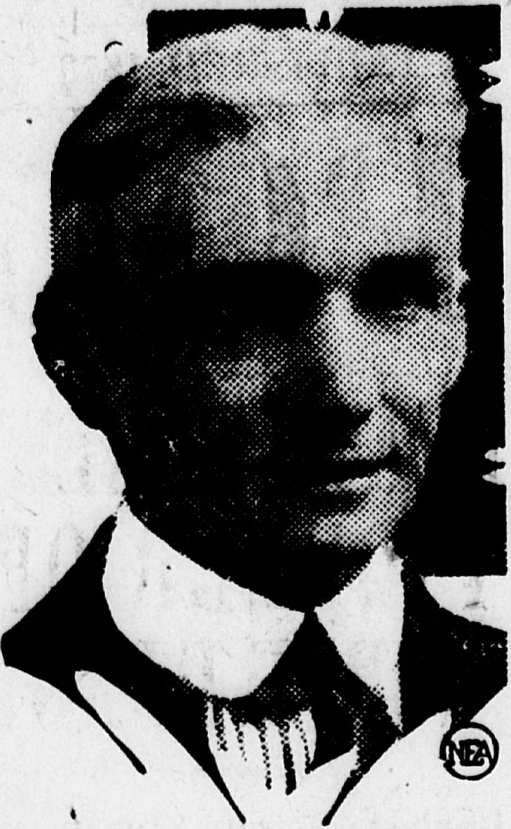

Member of the Michigan Senate from the 13th district
- In office January 1, 1925 – January 1, 1927
- Preceded by: Henry T. Ross
- Succeeded by: Peter B. Lennon

Personal details
- Born: November 19, 1870 Flushing, Michigan
- Died: November 29, 1933 (aged 63) Flushing, Michigan
- Party: Republican

Warren J. Hinkley (November 19, 1870 – November 29, 1933) was a Michigan politician.

== Early life ==
Hinkley was born in Flushing, Michigan on November 19, 1870. Hinkley received an education in Flushing.

== Career ==
On November 4, 1924, Hinkley was elected to the Michigan Senate where he represented the 13th district from January 1, 1925 to January 1, 1927. Hinkley was a Republican.

== Death ==
Hinkley died in Flushing on November 29, 1933.
