= Clarance B. Blethen =

American newspaper executive (1879–1941)

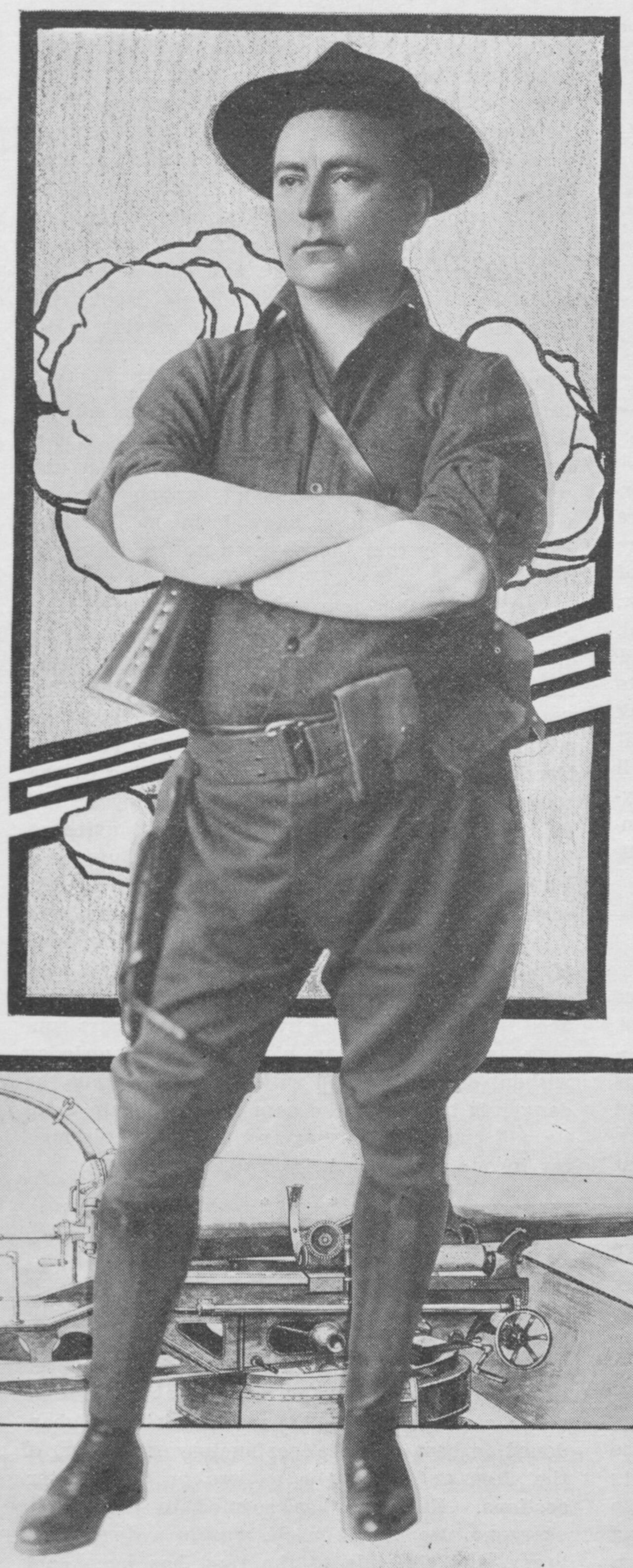
Image of Blethen published in 1917

Clarance Brettun Blethen (also spelled Clarence; February 1, 1879 – October 30, 1941) was the son of Alden J. Blethen, and publisher of The Seattle Times from 1915 until his death in 1941. The C.B. Blethen Award is named for him.

Clarance was born on February 1, 1879, in Portland, Maine—he began working at the paper in 1900, becoming managing editor in 1905. Following his father's death in 1915, Clarance became publisher of the newspaper, though its ownership was split amongst multiple heirs. In late 1929, Clarance bought all the shares owned by the other heirs and became sole owner of the paper. While managing the paper, he turned away from the sensationalist stance his father had taken in publishing, to a more sanitized style, banning the words gun and blood from appearing in stories. In 1929, he sold 49.5% of The Seattle Times Company to Herman Ridder. There are differing accounts on whether the deal completed in 1929 or 1930 and on the estimated millions in price. In 2006, the stake was sold to McClatchy.

In 1901, Blethen married Frances Hall. The couple had two sons, Francis Alden Blethen Sr. a.k.a. Frank (1904–1967; served as director and president of the Times; father of Francis Alden Blethen Jr.) and Clarence Brettun Blethen II (1906–1975) before Frances died in 1908. Clarance remarried in 1909 to Rachael "Rae" Kingsley, with whom he had three more sons: Alden Joseph Blethen III (1910–1930), William Kingsley Blethen (1913–1967; publisher of the Times from 1949 to 1967), and John Alden Blethen (1918–1993; publisher from 1967 to 1982). Blethen died at his home in Medina, Washington in 1941.
