= Michigan's 13th Senate district =

American legislative district

Michigan's 13th State Senate district
Senator
Rosemary Bayer; D–West Bloomfield
- Demographics: 69% White; 8.4% Black; 3% Hispanic; 13% Asian; 0.1% Native American; 4% Multiracial
- Population (2024): 268,637

Michigan's 13th Senate district is one of 38 districts in the Michigan Senate. The 13th district was created by the 1850 Michigan Constitution, as the 1835 constitution only permitted a maximum of eight senate districts. It has been represented by Democrat Rosemary Bayer since 2023, following her victory over Republican Jason Rhines.

== Geography ==
District 13 encompasses parts of Oakland and Wayne counties.

=== 2011 Apportionment Plan ===
District 13, as dictated by the 2011 Apportionment Plan, covered eastern Oakland County in the northern suburbs of Detroit, including Troy, Rochester Hills, Royal Oak, Berkley, Clawson, Birmingham, Bloomfield Hills, and Rochester.

The district was split among Michigan's 8th, 9th, and 11th congressional districts, and overlapped with the 26th, 27th, 40th, 41st, and 45th districts of the Michigan House of Representatives.

== List of senators ==
Senator	Party	Dates	Residence	Notes
Charles Dickey	Whig	1853–1854	Marshall	
Erastus Hussey	Republican	1855–1856	Battle Creek	
Nathan Pierce	Republican	1857–1858	Marengo	
Charles T. Gorham	Republican	1859–1860	Marshall	
George H. French	Republican	1861–1864	Homer	
Victory P. Collier	Republican	1865–1866	Battle Creek	
Cyrus G. Luce	Republican	1867–1868	Gilead	
John H. Jones	Republican	1869–1870	Quincy	
Caleb D. Randall	Republican	1871–1872	Coldwater	
David Anderson	Republican	1873–1874	Bear Lake Mills	
Albert Thompson	Republican	1875–1876	South Haven	
William Chamberlain	Republican	1877–1880	Three Oaks	
Thomas Mars	Republican	1881–1882	Berrien Center	
Henry F. Pennington	Democratic	1883–1884	Charlotte	
John Carveth	Republican	1885–1886	Middleville	
William A. Atwood	Republican	1887–1888	Flint	
William Ball	Republican	1889–1890	Hamburg	
John R. Benson	Patrons (Note: The Patrons of Industry were a farming organization founded in Port Huron, Michigan which, by 1890, had begun participating in political action independent of other political parties at the state level.)	1891–1892	Mount Morris	Also endorsed by the Democrats.
Jesse D. Crane	Republican	1893–1894	Fenton	
Ransom C. Johnson	Republican	1895–1896	Flint	
George W. Teeple	Republican	1897–1898	Pinckney	
Ira Terry Sayre	Republican	1899–1900	Flushing	
William S. Pierson	Republican	1901–1902	Flint	
George Barnes	Republican	1903–1904	Howell	
James F. Rumer	Republican	1905–1906	Davison	
Thomas J. Allen	Republican	1907–1908	Flint	
Francis J. Shields	Republican	1909–1910	Howell	
Leonard Freeman	Republican	1911–1912	Fenton	
Edwin J. Curts	Progressive	1913–1914	Flint	
George A. Barnes	Republican	1915–1916	Flint	
Hugh A. Stewart	Republican	1917–1918	Flint	
Claude M. Stoddard	Republican	1919–1920	Davison	
Henry T. Ross	Republican	1921–1924	Milford	
Warren J. Hinkley	Republican	1925–1926	Flushing	
Peter B. Lennon	Republican	1927–1932	Lennon	
William Palmer	Democratic	1933–1937	Flint	Resigned.
David M. Martin	Democratic	1939–1940	Flint	
Robert B. McLaughlin	Democratic	1941–1944	Flint	
Robert J. MacDonald	Democratic	1945–1946	Flint	
John A. Wright	Republican	1947–1948	Flint	
Garland B. Lane	Democratic	1949–1964	Flint	
Terry L. Troutt	Democratic	1965–1966	Romulus	
William Faust	Democratic	1967–1982	Westland	
Robert A. Welborn	Republican	1983–1985	Kalamazoo	Died in office.
Jack Welborn	Republican	1985–1994	Kalamazoo	
Mike Bouchard	Republican	1995–1999	Birmingham	Resigned after appointed Oakland County sheriff.
Shirley Johnson	Republican	1999–2006	Royal Oak	
John Pappageorge	Republican	2007–2014	Troy	
Marty Knollenberg	Republican	2015–2018	Troy	
Mallory McMorrow	Democratic	2019–2022	Royal Oak	
Rosemary Bayer	Democratic	2023–present	West Bloomfield	Lived in Keego Harbor until around 2023.
Sean Carlson	Democratic	(Note: Member-elect.)		

== Recent election results ==
=== 2020s ===
2026 Michigan Senate election
Primary election
Party	Candidate	Votes	%
Democratic	Sean Carlson	23,218	60.08
Democratic	Cecil D. George	10,742	27.79
Democratic	DC Anderson	4,688	12.13
Total votes		38,648	100
Republican	Ryan Berman	21,591	100
Total votes		21,591	100
General election
Democratic	Sean Carlson	71,577	53.04
Republican	Ryan Berman	63,379	46.96
Total votes		134,956	100
Democratic hold			

2022 Michigan Senate election, District 13
Primary election
Party	Candidate	Votes	%
Republican	Jason Rhines	15,478	66.4
Republican	Brian Williams	7,833	33.6
Total votes		23,311	100
General election
Democratic	Rosemary Bayer (incumbent)	78,098	57.2
Republican	Jason Rhines	58,513	42.8
Total votes		136,611	100
Democratic hold			

=== 2018 ===
2018 Michigan Senate election, District 13
Party	Candidate	Votes	%
Democratic	Mallory McMorrow	73,146	51.9
Republican	Marty Knollenberg (incumbent)	67,798	48.1
Total votes		140,944	100
Democratic gain from Republican			

=== 2014 ===
2014 Michigan Senate election, District 13
Primary election
Party	Candidate	Votes	%
Republican	Marty Knollenberg	8,788	36.2
Republican	Rocky Raczkowski	8,716	35.9
Republican	Chuck Moss	4,929	20.3
Republican	Ethan Baker	1,546	6.4
Republican	Al Gui	276	1.1
Total votes		24,255	100
Democratic	Cyndi Peltonen	7,620	54.9
Democratic	Ryan Fishman	6,252	45.1
Total votes		13,872	100
General election
Republican	Marty Knollenberg	59,570	58.1
Democratic	Cyndi Peltonen	42,892	41.9
Total votes		102,462	100
Republican hold			

=== Federal and statewide results ===
Year	Office	Results
2020	President	Biden 57.1 – 41.5%
2018	Senate	Stabenow 55.1 – 43.7%
2018	Governor	Whitmer 56.0 – 41.8%
2016	President	Clinton 50.4 – 44.4%
2014	Senate	Peters 52.1 – 44.3%
2014	Governor	Snyder 62.1 – 36.3%
2012	President	Romney 50.0 – 49.2%
2012	Senate	Stabenow 52.8 – 44.0%

== Historical district boundaries ==
Map	Description	Apportionment Plan	Notes
	Wayne County (part); Belleville; Canton Township; Dearborn Heights (part); Garden City; Huron Township; Inkster (part); Nankin Township; Romulus Township; Taylor Township (part); Van Buren Township; Wayne	1964 Apportionment Plan	
	Washtenaw County (part); Ypsilanti Township (part); Wayne County (part); Belleville; Canton Township; Garden City; Romulus Township; Sumpter Township; Taylor (part); Van Buren Township; Wayne; Westland (part)	1972 Apportionment Plan	
	Barry County; Ionia County; Kalamazoo County (part); Cooper Township; Kalamazoo; Kalamazoo Township (part); Richland Township; Montcalm County	1982 Apportionment Plan	
	Oakland County (part); Birmingham; Bloomfield Hills; Clawson; Ferndale; Hazel Park; Huntington Woods; Madison Heights; Pleasant Ridge; Royal Oak; Troy	1992 Apportionment Plan	
	Oakland County (part); Berkley; Birmingham; Bloomfield Hills; Bloomfield Township; Clawson; Madison Heights; Royal Oak; Troy	2001 Apportionment Plan	
	Oakland County (part); Berkley; Birmingham; Bloomfield Hills; Clawson; Rochester; Rochester Hills; Royal Oak; Troy	2011 Apportionment Plan	
