= Ransom C. Johnson =

American politician

Member of the Michigan Senate from the 13th district
- In office January 1, 1895 – 1896
- Preceded by: Jesse D. Crane
- Succeeded by: George W. Teeple

Personal details
- Born: July 12, 1849 Mundy Township, Michigan
- Died: October 7, 1904 (aged 55) Flint, Michigan
- Party: Republican

Ransom C. Johnson (July 12, 1849 – October 7, 1904) was a Michigan politician.

Johnson was born on July 12, 1849, in Mundy Township, Michigan.

He was a lawyer. He was sworn in as a member of the Michigan Senate from the 13th district on January 2, 1895, and served until 1896.

He was a member of the Odd Fellows.

Johnson died on October 7, 1904, in Flint, Michigan.
