= Idaho (sidewheeler) =

Sidewheeler steamboat

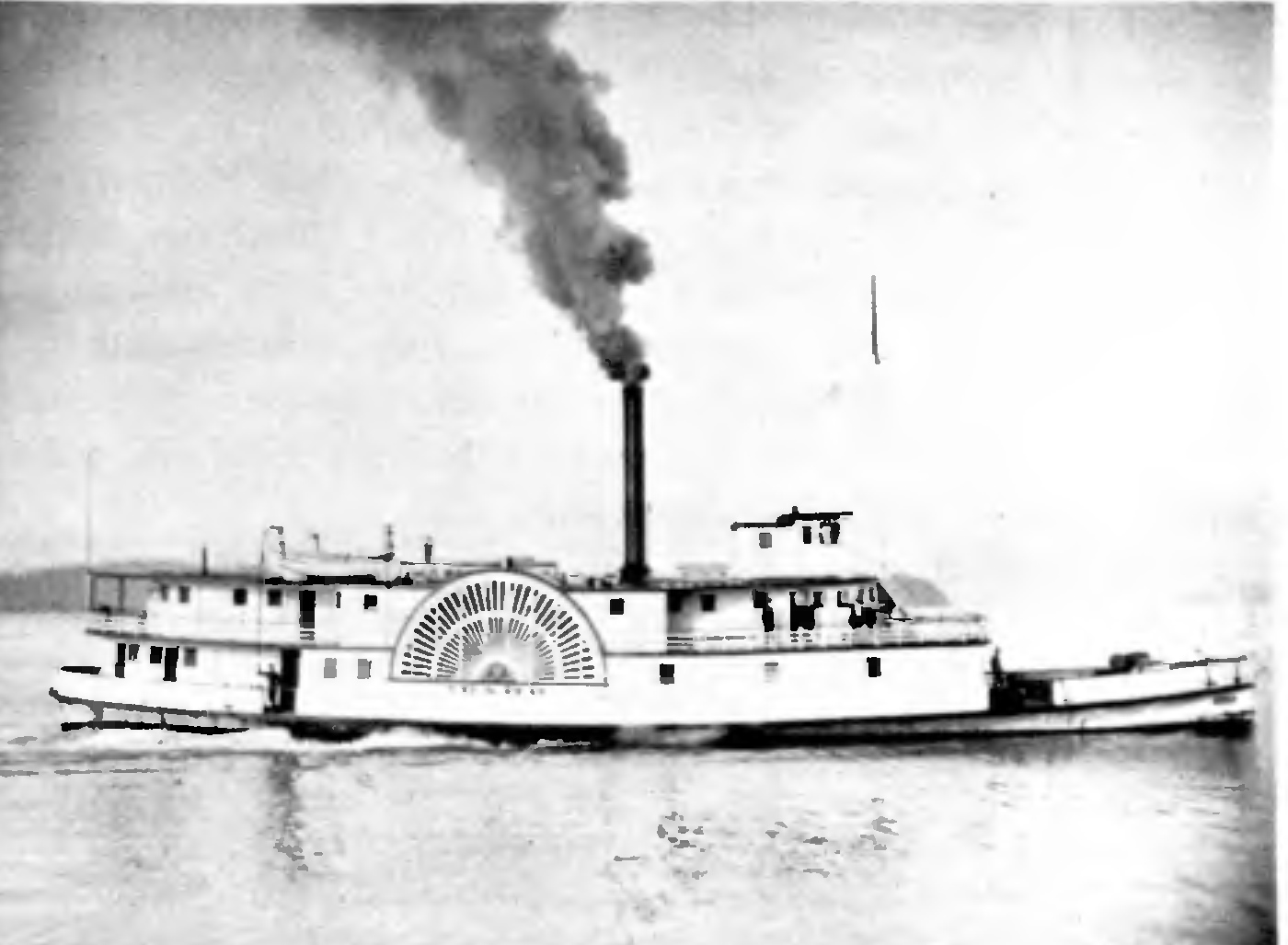
- Idaho

History
- Name: Idaho
- Owner: John Ruckel and later Oregon Steam Navigation Company
- Port of registry: US 12298
- Route: upper Columbia River, Puget Sound
- Builder: John J. Holland
- Out of service: 1894
- Fate: Abandoned

General characteristics
- Type: inland shallow-draft passenger/freight carrier, wooden hull and works
- Tonnage: 278 gross; 179 registered
- Length: 150.8 ft (46 m); after 1869 rebuild: 147.4 ft (45 m)
- Beam: 25.5 ft (8 m); after 1869 rebuild: 25 ft (8 m)
- Depth: 6.9 ft (2 m) depth of hold; after 1869 rebuild: 6.4 ft (2 m)
- Installed power: two steam engines, 16" bore by 80" stroke, horizontally mounted
- Propulsion: sidewheels
- Speed: 12 knots

The sidewheeler Idaho was a steamboat that ran on the Columbia River and Puget Sound from 1860 to 1898. There is some confusion as to the origins of the name; many historians have proposed it is the inspiration for the name of the State of Idaho. Considerable doubt has been cast on this because it is unclear if the boat was named before or after the idea of 'Idaho' as a territory name was proposed. John Ruckel also allegedly stated he had named the boat after a Native American term meaning 'Gem of the Mountains' he got from a mining friend from what is now Colorado territory. This steamer should not be confused with the many other vessels of the same name, including the sternwheeler Idaho built in 1903 for service on Lake Coeur d'Alene and the steamship Idaho of the Pacific Coast Steamship Line which sank near Port Townsend, Washington.

== Design and construction ==
Idaho was built on at the Upper Cascades on the Columbia River by John J. Holland (1843–1893) for John Ruckel. Holland, who was then only a very young man, later went on to build many famous steamboats, including in 1890 his masterpiece, the Bailey Gatzert

== Operations ==
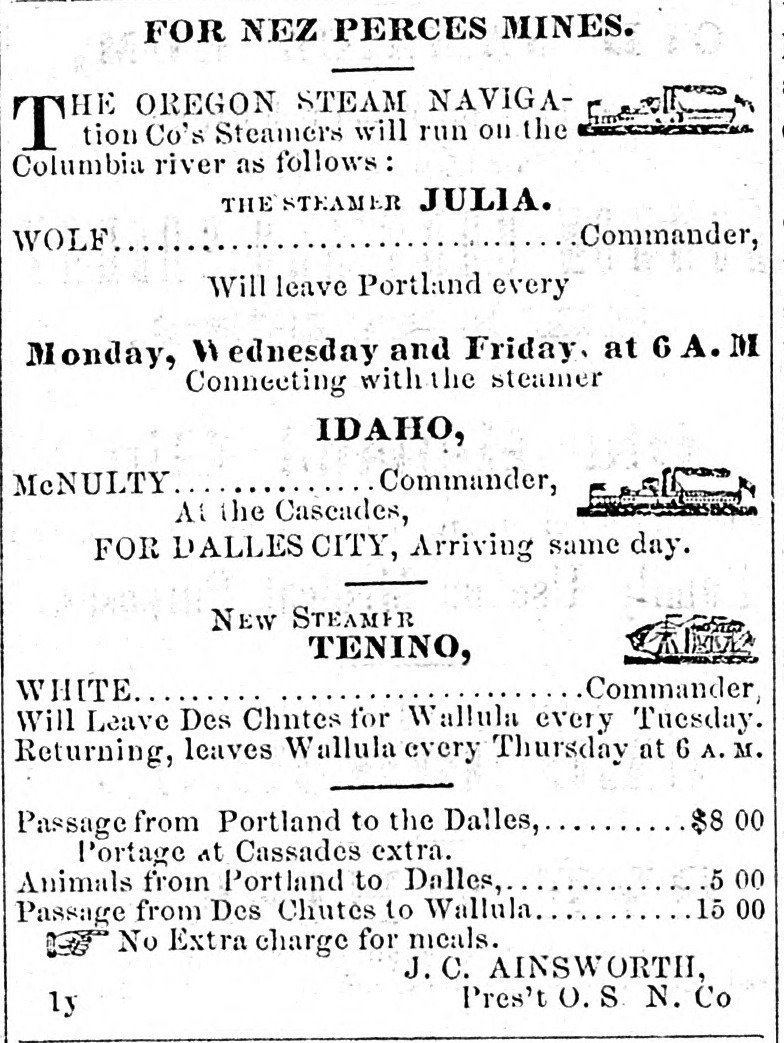
Advertisement for steamboats of the Oregon Steam Navigation Company, including Idaho on the middle Columbia

Soon after she was launched, Idaho was acquired by the Oregon Steam Navigation Company, and ran on the middle Columbia. This was a stretch of the river that ran between the rapids at the Cascades and The Dalles, where another longer stretch of rapids began. Because the rapids were not generally navigable, all traffic had to be routed around the rapids on portages, first paths and roads, then on railways. This meant that no single steamboat could run up the whole river. The Idaho's role was to transport people and freight on the middle Columbia, bracketed by the rapids at the Cascades and by Celilo Falls to the east. She ran on this route with the small sidewheeler Dalles and the larger Iris.

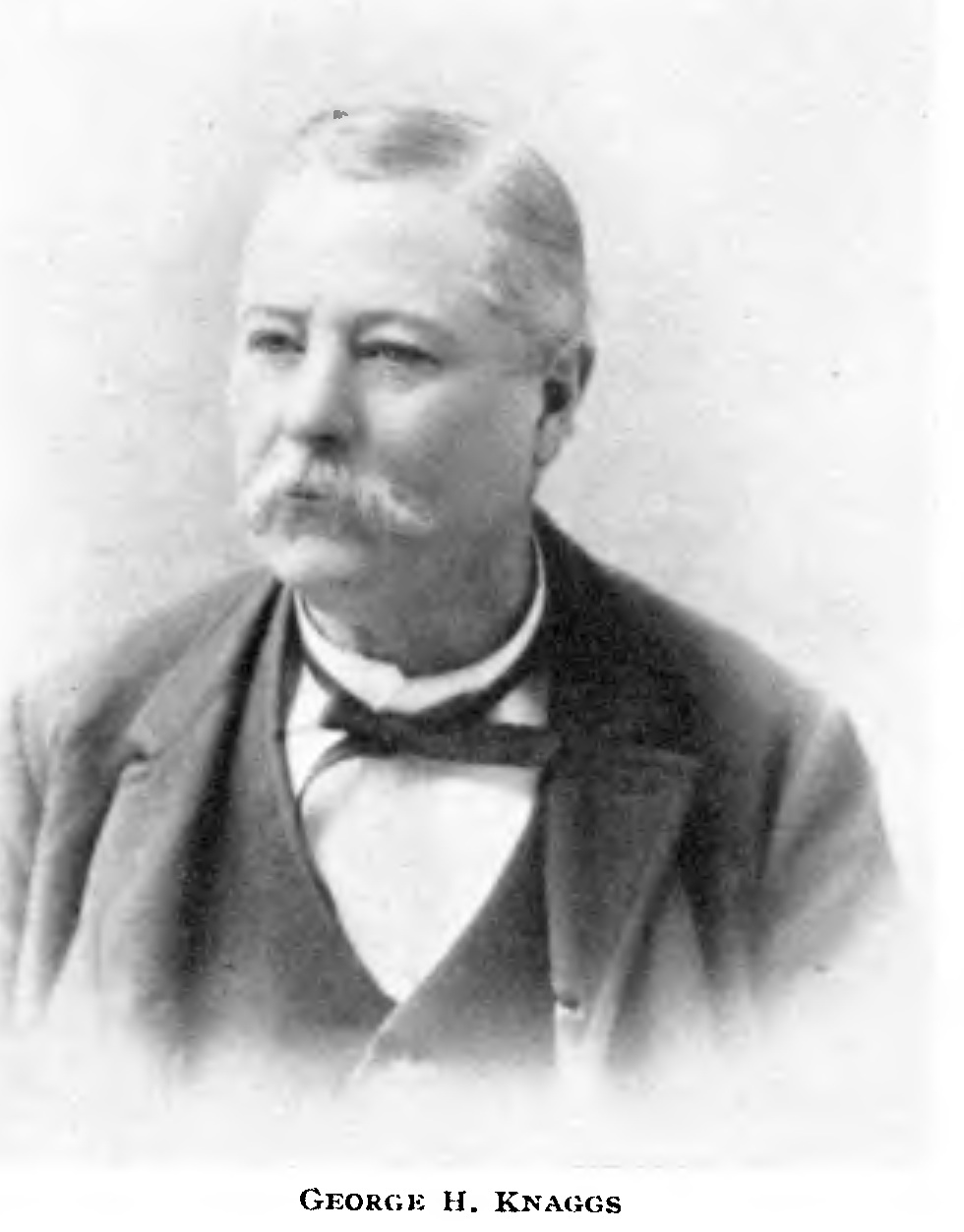
George H. Knaggs, an early purser of the Idaho

Idaho made a lot of money on the middle Columbia, when she was generally under the command of Captain John McNulty. The profits from Idaho's work allowed the Oregon Steam Navigation Company to build more and bigger steamers, including the Oneonta and Daisy Ainsworth. One of the most important positions on any steamboat was the purser, who was in charge of collecting fares, paying debts and wages, and in general running the business affairs of the vessel. During the times when steamboats were the center of commerce, the position of purser was a sought-after and lucrative post. One of the early pursers on the Idaho was George H. Knaggs, who also served on many other steamboats in the Pacific Northwest. Idaho was rebuilt in 1869.

In 1880, the shareholders of the Oregon Steam Navigation Company sold out to the Oregon Railway and Navigation Company. As railroads were constructed through from Portland to The Dalles, the steamboats of the middle river, including the Idaho could not compete and they were taken down through the Cascades Rapids one by one. Idaho was taken through on July 11, 1881, under the command of master steamboat captain James W. Troup.

Following her run through the Cascades, Idaho was taken down to Portland, Oregon, where she was hauled out of the water and completely rebuilt on a new hull. Her paddle wheels were replaced, and new cabin space and a new pilot house were added. The total cost of the reconstruction was $20,000.

== Transfer to Puget Sound ==
As the O.R. & N completed its railroad line up the Columbia, the company management realized that this would put out of work most of their steamboats on the middle river, including the Idaho. The only near place where these boats could be employed was Puget Sound, and the company began to expand its operations there. First, in May 1881 they bought the Starr Navigation Company, thereby acquiring the largest steamboat fleet on the sound, including among others, the George E. Starr. Next they began bringing the redundant boats from their Columbia River fleet around the Olympic Peninsula to Puget Sound. Taking a shallow draft lightly built inland-vessel on this route was a difficult task. The storms and sea conditions in this area of the Pacific Ocean were so bad that it became known as the Graveyard of the Pacific. Just crossing the Columbia Bar was dangerous even to large seagoing vessels.

The first boat brought around was the sternwheeler Welcome, with Capt. George S. Messegee (1837–1911), in command. Welcome was taken up in August 1881 the tow of the tug Tacoma. Captain Messegee then returned to the Columbia River to take the Idaho around. Originally the company had planned to have Idaho towed around just as Welcome had been, but when the company learned the towing charges would be $1,000, they ordered Captain Messegee to take Idaho up under her own power. Messegee took command of Idaho on October 22, 1881, the day she was launched following her reconstruction. In case of engine failure on the trip to Puget Sound, Messegee rigged up a square sail and a jib on the vessel.

At 8:00 a.m. on Sunday, February 19, 1882, Idaho left Portland on her voyage to Puget Sound, heading down first the Willamette River and then the Columbia, reaching Astoria, Oregon at 3:30 that afternoon. The next day, Monday the 20th, Messegee tried taking Idaho out from Astoria and west to the mouth of the Columbia, but conditions were so bad that the bar could not be safely crossed, and the vessel returned to Astoria. On Tuesday, Messegee took Idaho downriver again, and pulled into Baker Bay, near the Columbia Bar and the town of Ilwaco. On Wednesday, February 22, at 6:00 a.m. a second attempt to cross the bar failed, and Idaho returned to Baker Bay at 8:00 a.m., where Messegee and the assistant engineer Reuben Smith disembarked and went up to the Cape Disappointment Lighthouse to watch the sea conditions. At 11:00 a.m. they judged the seas to be sufficiently calm to allow the Idaho to cross the bar, so they returned to the vessel, and took her over the bar, encountering heavy seas as they did so. Once past the bar, Idaho ran fast on her own power, reaching Port Townsend the next day, February 23, 1882. This was the fastest time yet for any steamer brought around to the Sound from the Columbia River.

== Service on Puget Sound ==
Idaho went into service immediately on the Tacoma to Port Townsend route, under Capt. Cyrus Orr, former mate of the North Pacific. In 1883, the O.R. & N advertised her as

The first class steamer Idaho will leave Seattle every Sunday and Wednesday at 6 p.m. for Sehome and intermediate ports, returning on Tuesday and Friday, carrying passengers to all ports for 50 cents, freight 50 cents per ton.

An example of cargo carried by Idaho out of Tacoma on one trip was 450 tons of coal, 410 sacks of potatoes, 550 bundles of hoops, 2245 bundles of barrel staves, 15 sacks of onions, and five bales of hides.

In 1890 Idaho was sold to Capt. James Hastings who put on the route from Seattle to Everett, Washington and the Snohomish River. Idaho did not succeed on this route, and was then sold to Capt. Curtis D. Brownfield, who put her on the Seattle to Blaine route. On May 18, 1894, she was sold to Captain D.B. Jackson, who, doing business as the Northwestern Steamship Company (as known as the Washington Steamship Company), put her on the run from Seattle to Port Townsend by way of the mill ports (Port Gamble, Port Ludlow, etc.) Idaho's pilot during her ownership by the Washington line was Everett B. Coffin, later to become one of the most famous steamship captains of in the Northwest as captain of Flyer and the steel express passenger Tacoma.

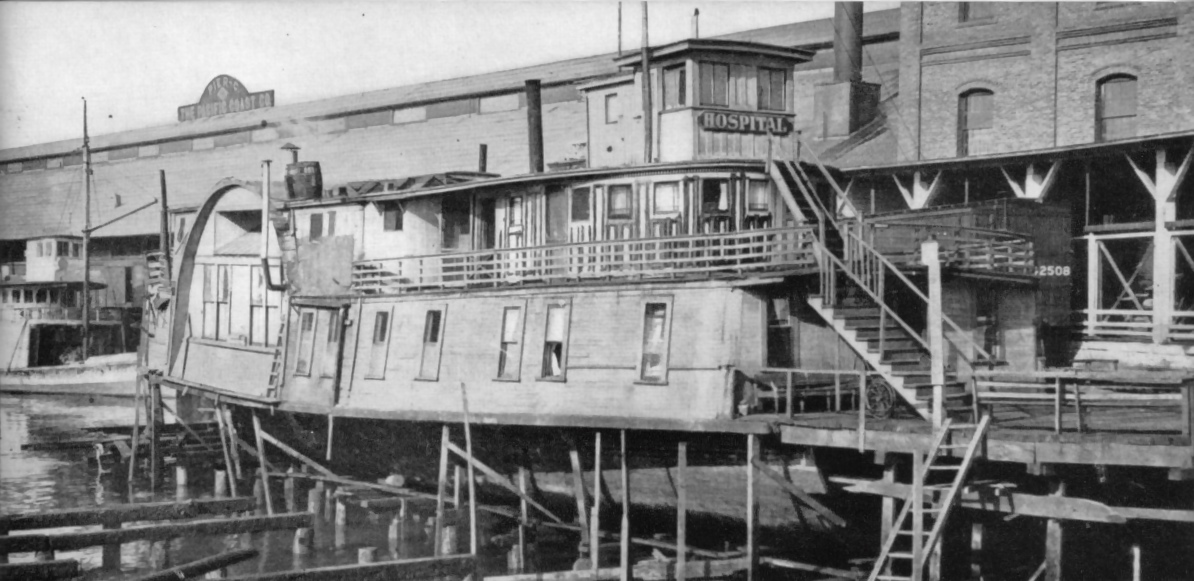
Hulk of Idaho in use as a hospital on Seattle waterfront, 1899 to 1907.

== Retirement from service ==
Idaho did not serve long with Captain Jackson, and on August 10, 1894, she was sold to Cohn & Cohn, a firm of junk dealers. They removed her machinery, and then sold her to Dr. Alexander De Soto. He had the vessel set up on pilings on the Seattle Waterfront at the foot of Washington Street, where she served as the Wayside Mission Hospital. Later she was taken over by the city of Seattle to function as the town's first emergency hospital until about 1909, when a new hospital was built ashore and she was finally abandoned. The vessel gradually fell apart and it is said that her slip was filled around her and she became part of the Alaskan Way in the growing city.
