= Sean Carlson (politician) =

American politician

Member-elect of the Michigan Senate from the 13th district
- Assuming office January 1, 2027
- Succeeding: Rosemary Bayer

Personal details
- Party: Democratic
- Spouse: Nicole Carlson
- Children: 2
- Education: Michigan State University

Military service
- Allegiance: United States
- Branch/service: United States Army; United States Air Force
- Rank: Lieutenant colonel

Sean Carlson is an American politician who is the member-elect of the Michigan Senate from the 13th district. He is from Commerce Township, Michigan and is a retired Lieutenant colonel in the United States Air Force.

After growing up in the Upper Peninsula of Michigan, Carlson attended Michigan State University, from which he earned a bachelor's degree in business administration, a master's degree in labor relations and human resources, and a juris doctor. He also served in the military, retiring in 2014, after which he worked with local and state government.

Carlson is married and has two children.
