= S. J. Clarke Publishing Company =

Self-publishing firm in Chicago, US

The S. J. Clarke Publishing Company, founded by S. J. Clarke (1842–1930), was a self-publishing firm in Chicago that sold subscription histories of communities from the 1890s until the 1930s. The publications had limited printings.

On March 13, 1876, a United States congressional resolution promoted gathering of local histories by communities to commemorate the centennial of independence. A number of publishers gathered these histories and recorded additional biographies to sell in most cases to the communities they described. These local histories now provide useful primary data for contemporary historians and genealogists. The S. J. Clarke Publishing Company was a major contributor with scores of titles of the form "A biographical Record of ..." with the name of a county in Iowa, Illinois or Ohio appended. The company later extended to include locations as far away as California and British Columbia.

These books were commercial ventures whose customers were in most cases the subjects of the material in the books. As a consequence, the tone of the subject matter was generally upbeat and positive.
