= Alden J. Blethen =

American teacher and newspaper owner (1845–1915)

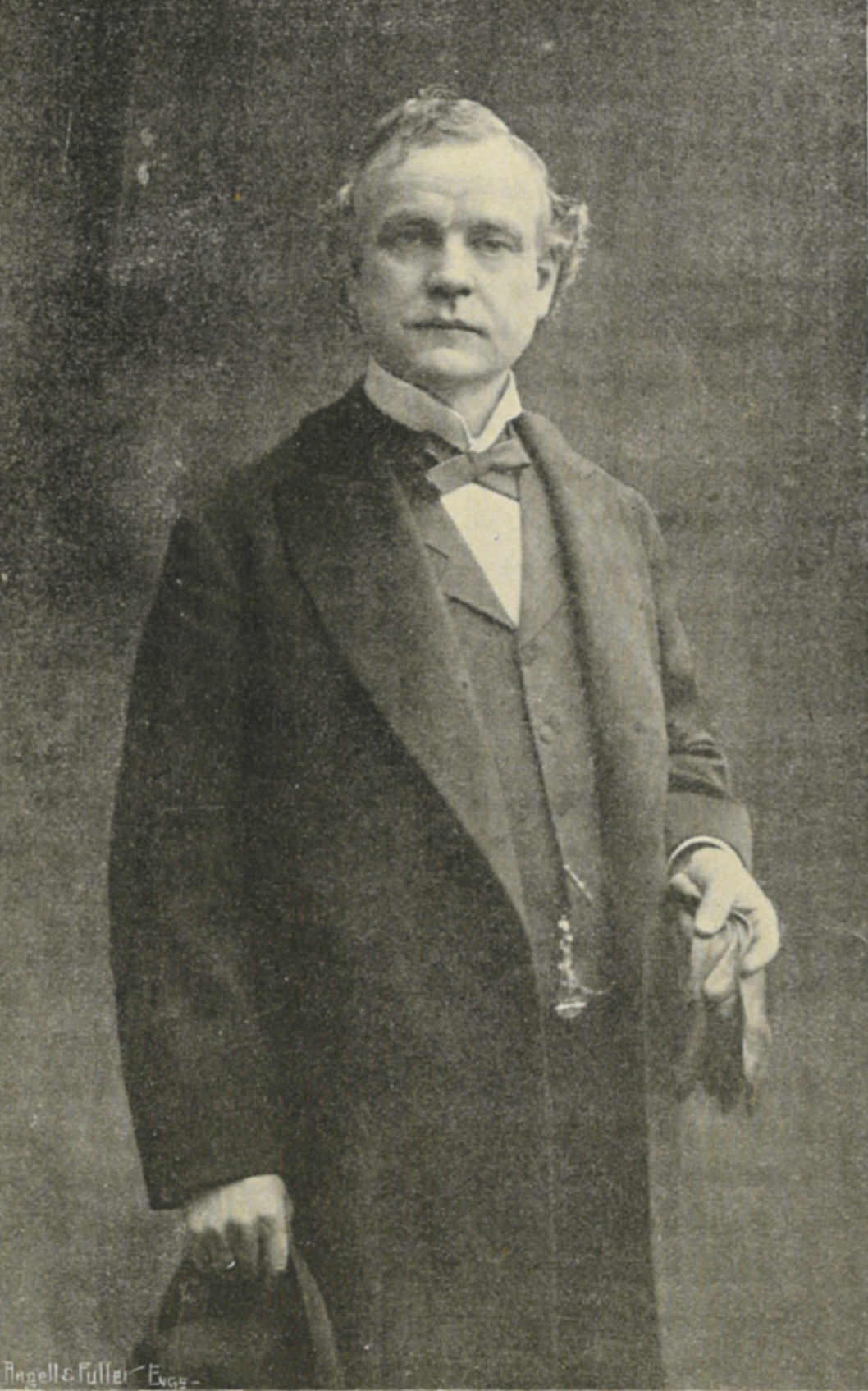
- Photo of Blethen taken in 1900
- Born: December 27, 1845; Knox, Maine, U.S.
- Died: July 12, 1915 (aged 69); Seattle, Washington, U.S.
- Known for: Editor in chief and owner of the Seattle Daily Times, 1896–1915

Alden Joseph Blethen (December 27, 1845 – July 12, 1915) was a teacher and attorney who was editor-in-chief of the Seattle Daily Times from August 10, 1896 until his death. He was often referred to as Colonel Blethen.

== Early life and education ==
Blethen was born in the town of Knox, Maine, in Waldo County, to Alden and Abigail "Abbie" Blethen. He attended the Maine Wesleyan Seminary and Female College (now Kents Hill School) beginning in 1864, graduating in 1868. He received a Master of Arts from Bowdoin College, then became a schoolteacher, teaching at the Abbott School in Farmington from 1869 to 1874. Later, he became a lawyer. At age 34 he moved his family to Kansas City, Missouri, and purchased part interest in the Kansas City Journal, becoming one of the incorporators of the Kansas City Club.

== Newspaper career ==
In 1884 after little success in Kansas, he moved to Minneapolis and became part owner of the Minneapolis Tribune. For the next 12 years, he operated the paper successfully and began to be called "Colonel" for his service on the staff of two Minnesota governors.

=== Seattle Daily Times ===
In 1896 with others, he purchased the Seattle Daily Times, a four-page daily newspaper with a readership of around 4,000, and succeeded in turning it into a large newspaper, attaining much power and prestige in the Seattle community.

== Death ==
At the time of his death, Seattle magazine The Town Crier wrote that "he was an editor whose personality pervaded the medium which he controlled."

Alden J. Blethen served as publisher of what is now The Seattle Times from 1896 until his death in 1915, and was succeeded by his son Clarance Brettun Blethen in this capacity. Publishing the newspaper remains in the Blethen family: Clarance published it from 1915 to 1941; his son, William Kingsley Blethen, published it from 1949 to 1967; William's brother, John Alden "Jack" Blethen, published it from 1967 to 1982); William and Jack's nephew Frank A. Blethen published the newspaper from 1985 until 2025; and Frank's son Ryan Blethen has published the paper since 2026. Clarance had sold 49.5% of the company's voting shares to Knight Ridder in 1929. McClatchy now owns the stake.
