= Woods Hutchinson =

English American physician and health writer

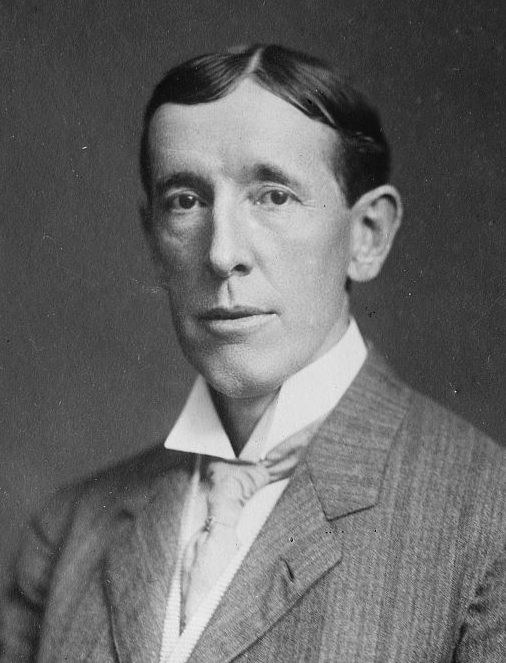
- Born: 3 January 1862; Selby, West Riding of Yorkshire, England
- Died: 26 April 1930 (aged 68); Brookline, Massachusetts, U.S.
- Education: University of Michigan Medical School
- Occupations: Physician, writer

Woods Hutchinson (3 January 1862 – 26 April 1930) was an English American physician and health writer. Hutchinson promoted the consumption of red meat and white bread and was strongly opposed to the ideas of vegetarianism.

== Biography ==
Hutchinson was born at Selby, Yorkshire, England. He graduated from Penn College, Oskaloosa, Iowa in 1880, and received his medical degree from the University of Michigan four years later. He worked as a professor of anatomy at the State University of Iowa between 1891 and 1896 and then became a professor of comparative pathology at the University of Buffalo until 1900. While at Buffalo, he also edited The Polyclinic and lectured at the London Medical Graduates' College and the University of London, starting in 1899. Besides The Polyclinic, he edited Vis Medicatrix early in his career, (from 1890 to 1891). In 1903, he became the Oregon State Health Officer; he held that post for two years. Following the post in Oregon, he became a professor of clinical medicine at the New York Polyclinic.

== Dieting ==
Hutchinson supported a form of eugenics that espoused the importance of animal protein in the human diet. He has been described as "one of the most popular advocates for the importance of meat in human diets during the era." Hutchinson's dietary advice was heavily connected to his advocacy of eugenics. He believed that vegetarianism was uncivilized and made the population weak. In his book Instinct and Health he wrote that "it may be stated that vegetarianism is the diet of the enslaved, stagnant, and conquered races, and a diet rich in meat is that of the progressive, the dominant, and the conquering strains."

Hutchinson was highly critical of vegetarianism and the low-protein diet ideas of John Harvey Kellogg and Russell Henry Chittenden. He argued that proteins are the "most necessary foods". Hutchinson downplayed the importance of fruits and vegetables in the diet. He also opposed the consumption of breakfast cereals, which he believed lacked in food value. He disliked brown bread, especially Graham bread because he believed they were less nourishing than white bread and irritable to the bowels. He stated that breakfast should include bacon and eggs. He recommended for health the consumption of large quantities of barely cooked beef.

Hutchinson defended adipose tissue against the viewpoint that it was a health risk. He commented that adipose "is really a most harmless, healthful, innocent tissue." He argued against fashion and trends in which young women wanted to be thin and wrote that "the long-for slender and boyish figure is becoming a menace."

Hutchinson was attacked by vegetarians. For example, Kellogg's Good Health journal described Hutchinson as a "beef drunkard and propagandist of the most pronounced type."

== Selected publications ==
- The Gospel According to Darwin (1898)
- The Cancer Problem (1900)
- Studies in Human and Comparative Pathology (1901)
- Instinct and Health (1908)
- Fat and Its Follies (1909)
- Preventable Diseases (1909)
- Conquest of Consumption (1910)
- Exercise and Health (1911)
- The Child's Day (1912)
- Common Diseases (1913)
- Civilization and Health (1914)
- The Doctor in War (1918)
- A Handbook of Health (1922)
