= Marion Babcock Baxter =

American lecturer and author (1850–1910)

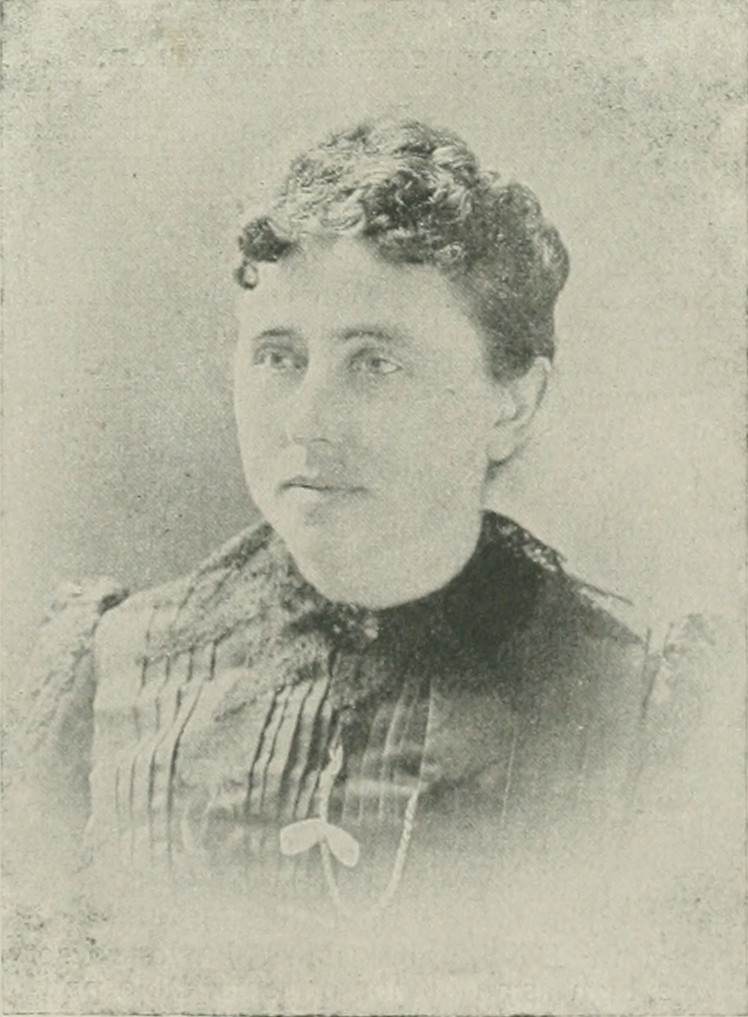
- Undated drawing of Baxter
- Born: Marion Babcock; April 12, 1850; Litchfield, Michigan, U.S.
- Died: November 18, 1910 (aged 60); Seattle, Washington, U.S.
- Occupations: Lecturer, author, editor
- Spouse: C. K. K. Baxter
- Children: Beatrice Baxter
- Writing career
- Language: English
- Genres: Poetry, social and political commentary
- Subjects: Temperance, women’s suffrage, social issues
- Notable works: Bits of Verse and Prose

Marion Babcock Baxter (April 12, 1850 – November 18, 1910) was an American lecturer and author.

At twenty years of age, she delivered her first public address at Jonesville, Michigan. It attracted wide and favorable attention, and fixed her vocation as a lecturer. From that time, she was constantly before the public, speaking to large audiences in all parts of the country, temperance and women's suffrage generally being her theme, but also social and political relations of society.

Baxter served as president of Wayside Mission Hospital, located on the good ship Idaho, a side-wheel steamer built in 1860 for the Columbia River business. It was Seattle, Washington's first hospital ship.

Her writing included a poetry collection, serving as a correspondent for various newspapers, and her work as an editorial writer.

== Early life ==
Marion Babcock was born on a farm in Litchfield, Michigan, April 12, 1850. Her father, Abel E. Babcock, was an Adventist minister in the times when it required courage to preach an unpopular doctrine. Her mother was Mary Babcock. Baxter traced her lineage hack to the English Reformation. Her ancestors date back to the Babcocks who came to the United States with the pilgrims in the good ship Anne, in 1623. Her ancestors fought with the colonists through the American Revolution.

Her early childhood was spent in poverty and self-denial. In childhood, she had few companions, for the Adventist doctrine was so unpopular and the persecution so pointed that even the children caught the spirit and were accustomed to tease her. In her girlhood, she developed a fine voice and was much in demand for concert singing, but she lost her voice suddenly, and turned to the lecture platform.

== Career ==
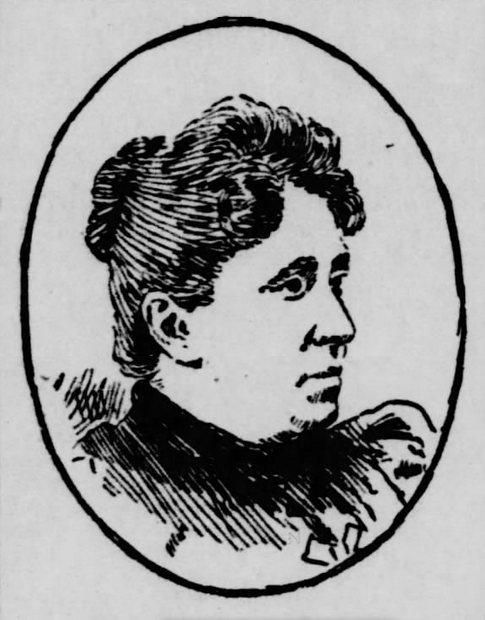
Undated drawing of Baxter.

Her first lecture (at the age of 20) was given in Jonesville, Michigan, where she had lived since she was five years old. Her subject was "The Follies of Fashion". On that occasion, the opera-house was packed, a band furnished music, and all of Jonesville attended. It was considered a success, and she eventually became widely known as a lecturer. She charged US$50−100 for literary lectures and US$25 when speaking on the topic of temperance.

At the age of 22, she married C. K. K. Baxter, a son of Levi Baxter, the head of one of the oldest and most respected families in the state. They had at least one child, a daughter, Beatrice, who became an elocutionist. For many years, Baxter was a member of the Congregational church.

Baxter was employed for several years on the Seattle Daily Times. In 1910, Beatrice published a collection of her mother's poems, Bits of Verse and Prose, By Marion B. Baxter (Lowman & Hanford Co., Seattle, 1910).

Baxter, an intimate friend of Frances Willard, became a prominent member of the Woman's Christian Temperance Union (W.C.T.U.), and also of the National W.C.T.U. lecture bureau. Baxter became a member of the WCTU when it first organized, and played a vital role in securing Seattle as the location for the 1899 National WCTU convention. She served as a financial agent of the National W.C.T.U., and was credited with having put the W.C.T.U. on a firm financial basis.

Baxter served as the deputy supreme commander of the Ladies of the Maccabees, for the province of British Columbia. In 1891, she was elected state president of the White Rose League (of Michigan).

== Later life and death ==
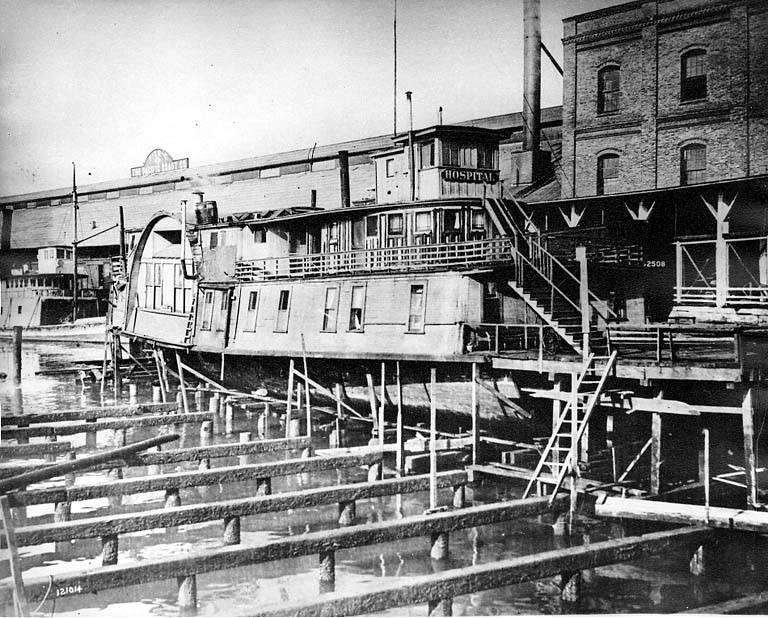
Wayside Mission Hospital, ca. 1900–1910

For the last seven years of her life, Baxter served as president of Wayside Emergency Hospital in Seattle. Based on the hospital ship Idaho, it was the only free hospital in the city. Roger S. Green and other public-spirited men of the city bought the ship and gave it for the benefit of those too poor to pay for hospital care. Baxter explained,— "It is a charity ship, pure and simple. The only requisite for admission is that the applicant be sick and helpless."

In 1906, unable to continue active suffrage work in the King County Equality Club on account of illness, she was elected its honorary president. In 1909, she became the advisory secretary of the Alaska–Yukon–Pacific Exposition to the Triennial Council of Women.

Baxter died at her home in Seattle, November 18, 1910.

== Selected works ==
- Bits of Verse and Prose, By Marion B. Baxter, 1910
