= Rosemary Bayer =

American politician (born 1959)

Member of the Michigan Senate
- Incumbent
- Assumed office January 1, 2019
- Preceded by: Jim Marleau
- Constituency: 12th district (2019–2023); 13th district (2023–present)

Personal details
- Born: January 2, 1959 (age 67) Beverly Hills, Michigan, U.S.
- Party: Democratic
- Spouse: John
- Children: 1
- Education: Central Michigan University (BS); Lawrence Technological University (MBA)
- Website: Campaign website

Rosemary K. Bayer (born January 2, 1959) is a Democratic member of the Michigan Senate, representing the 13th district since 2023.

Before being elected to the state legislature, Bayer worked as a computer engineer and analyst. She serves on the board of directors for SheHive and co-founded the Michigan Council of Women in Technology.
