= Jesse D. Crane =

American politician (1841–1914)

Member of the Michigan Senate from the 13th district
- In office January 1, 1893 – 1894
- Preceded by: John R. Benson
- Succeeded by: Ransom C. Johnson

Personal details
- Born: October 2, 1841 New York, U.S.
- Died: May 20, 1914 (aged 72) Fenton, Michigan, U.S.
- Party: Republican

Jesse D. Crane (October 2, 1841 – May 20, 1914) was a Michigan politician.

== Early life ==
Crane was born on October 2, 1841, in New York to parents Elam and Eliza Crane. His family moved to a farm in Fenton, Michigan, in 1846.

== Personal life ==
Crane married Elizabeth. Together they had five children. Elizabeth died by 1900.

== Career ==
Crane was a farmer. Crane was sworn in as a member of the Michigan Senate from the 13th district on January 4, 1893, and served until 1894.

== Death ==
Crane dies on May 20, 1914, in Fenton, Michigan.
