= Cayton (disambiguation) =

Cayton is a village and civil parish in England

Cayton may also refer to:

== Surname ==
- Adam Cayton-Holland (born 1980), American comedian
- Andrew Cayton (1954–2015), American history scholar
- Bill Cayton (1918–2003), American boxing promoter
- Horace R. Cayton Jr. (1903–1970), American sociologist
- Horace R. Cayton Sr. (1859–1940), American journalist and political activist
- Marie Therese Cayton (1959–1991), American soldier
- Nathan Cayton (1899–1977), American attorney and jurist
- Revels Cayton (1907–1995), American union leader and Civil Rights activist
- Susan Cayton Woodson (1918–2013), American art collector and activist
- Susie Revels Cayton (1870–1943), American writer and activist

== Other ==
- Cayton Guard Station
- Cayton railway station
- South Stainley with Cayton

== See also ==
- Çayton
- Clayton
