= Horace R. Cayton =

Horace R. Cayton may refer to:

- Horace R. Cayton Sr. (1859–1940), African-American newspaper publisher
- Horace R. Cayton Jr. (1903–1970), his son, American sociologist
