= George Britton =

George Britton may refer to:

- George Britton (musician) (1910–1991), American opera singer, folk guitarist, and musical theatre actor
- George Britton (cricketer) (1843–1910), English first class cricketer
- George Britton Halford (1824–1910), English-born Australian anatomist and physiologist
- George Britton (politician) (1863–1929), English boot and shoe manufacturer and Member of Parliament
- George Crawford Britton (1854–1929), South Dakota and Washington state politician and lawyer
