= Sidney Dillon Redmond =

American lawyer, politician (1871–1948)

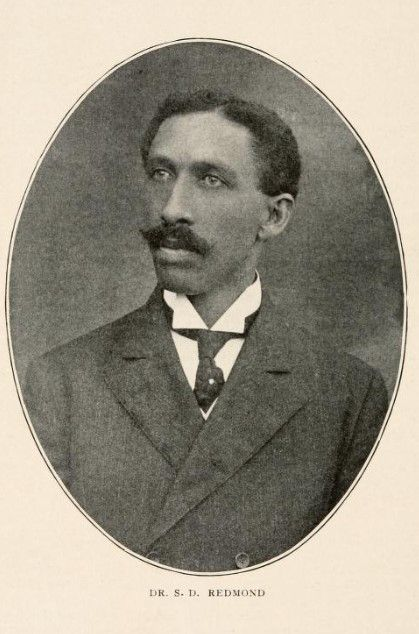
- Born: October 11, 1871; Ebenezer, Mississippi, U.S.
- Died: February 11, 1948 (aged 76); Jackson, Mississippi, U.S.
- Other name: S. D. Redmond
- Education: Rust University (BA, MA)
- Occupations: Physician, lawyer, politician, businessperson, real estate investor, civic leader
- Political party: Republican
- Spouse: Ida Revels Redmond (m. ?–1914; death)
- Children: 2, including Sidney Revels Redmond
- Relatives: Hiram R. Revels (father in-law)

Sidney Dillon Redmond (October 11, 1871 – February 11, 1948) was an American civic leader, physician, lawyer, and politician from Jackson, Mississippi. He was an important African American community leader and headed the Mississippi Republican Party as part of the "black-and-tan" faction. Later in his career (1910) he became a lawyer. His son Sidney Revels Redmond, was a Harvard University Law School graduate, and lawyer; he shared a law practice with his son in Jackson, starting in 1926.

== Early life ==
Redmond was born on October 11, 1871, in Ebenezer, Mississippi. He was born into a poor family, and his father died when he was twelve years old. His mother moved from Ebenezer to Holly Springs so they could be able to afford for the children.

He attended Rust University (now Rust College), where he graduated with a bachelor of arts in 1894, and master of arts degree in 1904.

== Career ==
He briefly worked as a college mathematics instructor. This was followed by a career in medicine, as a physician.

=== Politics ===
Redmond was involved in Mississippi Republican politics, serving as a delegate to the 1916, 1928 Republican National Convention, 1940, and 1944 Republican National Conventions.

He reportedly owned some 300 rental homes in the Farish Street Neighborhood Historic District in Jackson, which made him wealthy (and he was possibility one of the most wealthy residents of the state at that time).

=== Law and legal issues ===
Redmond became a lawyer in 1910. In 1915, he was disbarred for issues around litigation of a bankrupt fraternity; and by 1920 he was reinstated. After his son Sidney Revels Redmond graduated from Harvard Law School in 1926, they opened a firm together. Shortly thereafter the two lawyers dealt with many charges of misconduct by white lawyers in Mississippi for the next four years due to racism and because of Redmond Sr.'s political career.

In 1929, both Redmond lawyers faced misconduct charges and false testimony charges during a peonage trial (an involuntary servitude or slavery trial). The charges against his son Sidney Revels Redmond would be dropped, with the condition he left the state of Mississippi and practiced law elsewhere. He moved to St. Louis.

Meanwhile, Sidney Dillon Redmond stayed in Mississippi to fight the charges. A Mississippi disciplinary bar committee filed a motion for a new hearing after, citing racial prejudice in the case summary by Judge V. J. Strickler of Hinds County. The court motion filed by Redmond was also challenged, due to what was considered an attack on the Constitution of Mississippi. The court cited criminal contempt for Redmond's statement, and fined him US$500. He was again disbarred and faced imprisonment; so he petitioned the Supreme Court of Mississippi (while using white lawyers). Between 1930 and 1931, the Supreme Court of Mississippi heard his case twice, and both times they ruled in his favor.

== Personal life ==
He was married to Ida Revels Redmond, the daughter of Hiram Revels. His wife died in 1914.

Redmond died on February 11, 1948, in Jackson.
