= Jeremiah Williams =

Jeremiah Williams may refer to:

- Jeremiah Norman Williams (1829–1915), U.S. Representative from Alabama
- Jeremiah Williams (British politician) (1872–1919), Welsh barrister and politician
- Jeremiah M. P. Williams (died 1884), Reconstruction era Mississippi politician
- Scooby Williams (born 2003), American football player
