= Sidney Revels Redmond =

American lawyer, politician, civil rights activist (1902–1974)

- Born: July 23, 1902; Jackson, Mississippi, U.S.
- Died: May 10, 1974 (aged 71); United States
- Burial place: Valhalla Cemetery, St. Louis, Missouri, United States
- Other names: Sidney R. Redmond, S.R. Redmond
- Education: Harvard University, Harvard Law School
- Occupations: Lawyer, politician, civil rights activist
- Political party: Republican
- Spouse: Gladys C. Freeman (m. 1932–1974; death)
- Parents: Sidney Dillon Redmond (father); Ida Revels Redmond (mother)
- Relatives: Hiram R. Revels (maternal grandfather), Susie Revels Cayton (maternal aunt)

Sidney Revels Redmond (July 23, 1902 – May 10, 1974) was an American lawyer, politician, and civil right activist. He was the chief council for Lloyd L. Gaines in Gaines v. Canada (1938). He served as the president of the National Bar Association in 1939, he worked as an NAACP lawyer, and was a past president of the local NAACP from 1938 to 1944.

== Early life and education ==
Sidney Revels Redmond was born on July 23, 1902, in Jackson, Mississippi, to Black parents Ida Alcorn Revels and Sidney Dillon Redmond. His maternal grandfather was politician Hiram R. Revels.

He attended Harvard University for undergrad economics, followed by attendance at Harvard Law School.

== Career ==
After graduation in 1926 or 1927, Redmond started a law firm with his father in Jackson, Mississippi. Shortly thereafter the two lawyers dealt with many charges of misconduct by white lawyers in Mississippi for the next four years due to racism and because of his father's political career. After Mississippi charges of misconduct and false testimony charges during a peonage trial (an involuntary servitude or slavery trial) that threatened his disbarment in that state. In 1929, Redmond Jr. left Mississippi for St. Louis, Missouri.

Redmond was involved in Missouri Republican politics, and served as a delegate from the 11th Congressional District in Missouri to the 1940 Republican National Convention in Philadelphia.

He died on May 10, 1974, in the United States, and was buried at Valhalla Cemetery in St. Louis.
