= George Crawford Britton =

Politician and lawyer

Member of the Washington House of Representatives from the 37th district
- In office 1901–1903

Personal details
- Born: 1854 Tipton, Iowa
- Died: 1929 (aged 74–75) Tacoma, Washington
- Party: Republican
- Children: 2
- Education: Northern Indiana Normal College (later Valparaiso University), Valparaiso, Indiana (1877–1878); State University of Iowa (graduated in 1881)
- Occupation: Lawyer; member of Washington House of Representatives (1900); councilmember of Tacoma City Council (1901-1904); United States commissioner in Alaska (1902-1914); judge; notary public
- Known for: A lawyer and politician who was a member of the Dakota Territory and Washington State Legislatures and of Tacoma City Council. Led successful legal practice and was active politically in the states of Iowa, South Dakota, and Washington and served as judge, notary public, and United States commissioner in Alaska.

George Crawford Britton (1854–1929) was a politician and lawyer in the states of Iowa, South Dakota, Washington, and Alaska. He represented Spink County in the Dakota Territory legislation and was a member of the Washington State Legislature and Tacoma City Council. He had a successful legal career in Iowa, South Dakota, and Washington states, and served as a judge, United States commissioner, and notary public in Alaska.

Britton started his legal career in Iowa in 1881, building a successful practice until he moved to South Dakota (prior to 1889, called the Dakota Territory). He co-opened the Britton & Moriarty law firm in Northville, and became recognized in legal and public circles of the city. He took part in several Dakota Territory constitutional conventions, including the one in 1888 regarding the territory's separation into two states and outlining an organic law (a system of laws that form the foundation of a government) for South Dakota.

Britton came to Tacoma in 1889. He launched his law office there, and became a highly esteemed member of the city's Bar Association. From 1890, Britton participated in Washington State politics as a member of the Republican party. In 1900, he represented Pierce County in the Washington State House of Representatives in the 7th Washington State Legislature. As a member of the state Legislature, Britton created and introduced new probate law and helped pass a new jury law. Britton was elected as Tacoma City Councilman in 1901 and in 1903. He ran for re-election in 1904, but lost and resigned from politics.

Britton was appointed United States commissioner in Kayak, Alaska in 1902 and served at the position until at least 1908. He was later the commissioner and judge in Katalla until at least 1914. In Katalla, Britton also provided notary public services and investigated a case in connection with the monopolistic practices of the Alaska Syndicate.

== Early life, family, and education ==
Britton was born near Tipton, Iowa in 1854. His parents were Thomas H. Britton who came to Iowa from Virginia, and Frances Britton (Crawford) who moved to Iowa from Indiana. Both parents died by 1903.

George Britton spent his childhood on a family farm in Iowa.

From 1877 to 1878, Britton attended the Northern Indiana Normal College (later Valparaiso University) in Valparaiso, Indiana. Afterwards, Britton went to the University of Iowa, from which he graduated in 1881.

== Career ==
Britton's first job was a school teacher. He spent the money he earned on his education.

=== Iowa and South Dakota ===
On June 21, 1881, Britton was admitted to the bar in Iowa City, Iowa, and started his own law practice at once.

He moved to Tipton, Iowa, where he successfully practiced law for a year. Then he moved his practice again to Northville, South Dakota where he co-opened the law firm Britton & Moriarty.

Britton worked in Northville for several years and became a recognized attorney in the city. He also took an active part in the city's public life.

In 1885, Britton became a delegate to the constitutional convention in Sioux Falls, representing Dakota Territory's Spink County. A year later, when Redfield became the county seat of Spink County after a six-year political and legal fight with another town, Britton helped organize and co-hosted the victory banquet.

In 1888, prior to the division of Dakota Territory into two separate states, Britton was a member of the constitutional convention, during which an organic law (a system of laws that form the foundation of a government) was created for the new state of South Dakota.

=== Washington State ===
==== Legal practice ====
In November 1889, Britton settled in Tacoma, Washington and started his law practice there. By 1903, he was a highly esteemed member of the Bar Association of Tacoma.

In 1903, Britton operated his law practice from an office at 408-9 Berlin Building in Tacoma. He worked on a variety of cases, but probate cases were considered his specialty.

Britton was a member of the Judiciary Committee of Washington State, and in 1903, served as its chairman.

Recognized in legal circles of the city, Britton was also active in the city's public affairs.

==== Washington State Legislature ====
Britton was a highly esteemed political figure in Washington State. In 1890, Britton attended the Pierce County Republican Convention and was elected as a delegate from the 23rd district to attend the Republican convention in Tacoma. In the Pierce County Convention of 1898, Britton was again elected as a district delegates for the upcoming state convention.

A the Pierce County Republican Convention of 1900, Britton was nominated to represent the 23rd district in the Washington House of Representatives. He eventually became House Representative in the 7th Washington State Legislature representing Pierce County's 37th district.

In 1901, Britton created and introduced House Bill No. 28, "An act to establish a code of probate law and procedure" which was considered his most notable activity during that year's legislative session. Britton's bill was considered a complete replacement for already existing probate laws. It received a positive response and the House of Representatives passed it unanimously. However, the Senate did not take action in regard to it before the session's closing.

In 1901, Britton helped pass the new jury law in the state and was involved in disputes in regard to the Pierce County jury formation and violations of the new law.

In 1902, Britton ran for the Senate against S. M. LeCrone, whose candidacy was considered weak. At the time, Britton advocated for the establishment of Governor McBride's Railway Commission, while LeCrone was against the commission. That same year, Britton became a delegate to the Republican State Convention.

==== Tacoma City Council ====
In 1901, while the Republican party carried the municipal elections in Tacoma, Britton was elected a member of Tacoma City Council's Fifth Ward for a two-year term.

In March 1903, the municipal election for Tacoma City Council was held, and Britton ran for re-election to the council. In a heated battle, he ran for Fifth Ward City Convention delegate opposing F. B. Campbell. Britton was considered the most likely to win the municipal election. Eventually, he became a delegate to the city convention, received the nomination and was re-elected as councilman.

At the election for the City Council of 1904, Britton ran for councilman again, but lost to Olof H. Christoffersen and resigned from politics.

==== Other duties ====
Over the years in Tacoma, Britton was a member of municipal committees: on finance, power and water, and salaries. Britton supported progressive movements and reforms aimed at the city's improvement and development. In 1903, Britton was on a committee for the newly built Carnegie Library in Tacoma, built with the help of Scottish-American industrialist and philanthropist Andrew Carnegie.

=== Alaska ===
Britton was appointed United States commissioner in Alaska judiciary division No. 3 on April 1, 1902, his official address being Kayak, Alaska. However, he stayed in Tacoma at least until 1904, and was not officially listed at the Alaska position until 1906.

In 1907, Britton provided notary public services and belonged to a notary public commission in Katalla, Alaska.

In 1910, Britton was listed as judge and United States commissioner in Katalla Alaska. In 1911, he investigated a municipal case in Katalla in connection with the monopolistic practices of the Alaska Syndicate. He served as United States commissioner in Katalla until at least 1914.

== Personal life, family, and death ==
Britton married Clara A. Wheeler some time between 1882 and 1889 in the Dakota Territory. The family moved to Tacoma, Washington and owned a house at 4608 South J street. The Brittons had two daughters: Jasmine and Helen. Clara Britton died in 1894. Britton's daughter Jasmine taught school in Katalla, Alaska for several years. In 1910, Jasmine became the children's librarian in Spokane, Washington after finishing the Carnegie Library Training School and being in charge of the children's department of the Central Library in Pittsburgh.

In 1910, Britton purchased an 89,500-acre (36,200 ha) coal claim named Martin in Katalla, Alaska. In 1912, he received a notification of his claim's forfeiture due to the lack of improvements and developing by the owner.

Politically, Britton belonged to the Republican party.

George Britton died on September 1, 1929, in Tacoma, Washington.

== See also ==
- Washington State Legislature
- Tacoma City Council
- Tipton, Iowa
- Katalla, Alaska
- Alaska Syndicate

== Literature cited ==
- Catalogue of officers and alumni of the State university of Iowa, 1847 to 1885, and students, 1884-5, Iowa City: University of Iowa, 1885, OCLC 14796063
- "The constitutional convention", The Black Hills Daily Times, Deadwood: Porter Warner & Co., p. 2, September 13, 1885, LCCN sn85042861, OCLC 192106500
- "Redfield", Mitchell Daily Republican, Mitchell: The Mitchell Printing Company, p. 2, November 14, 1886, LCCN sn2001063113, OCLC 45859025
- Springer, William McKendree, ed. (February 24, 1888), Admission of South Dakota into the Union and for the organization of Territory of North Dakota, vol. 709, Washington: Committee on the Territories, OCLC 20613708
- "Pierce County Republicans", Seattle Post-Intelligencer, Seattle: Leigh S. J. Hunt, p. 3, September 24, 1890, ISSN 2379-7304, LCCN sn83045604, OCLC 9563195
- "It was Wilson's day", Seattle Post-Intelligencer, Seattle: Leigh S. J. Hunt, pp. 1, 2, September 26, 1890, ISSN 2379-7304, LCCN sn83045604, OCLC 9563195
- "F. W. Cushman is indorsed", Seattle Post-Intelligencer, Seattle: Leigh S. J. Hunt, p. 3, September 18, 1898, ISSN 2379-7304, LCCN sn83045604, OCLC 9563195
- Blethen, Alden J., ed. (August 13, 1900), "Routine of convention", Seattle Daily Times, Seattle: The Seattle Times Company, p. 7, ISSN 2639-4898, LCCN sn86072007, OCLC 1765328
- Murphy, John Miller, ed. (November 9, 1900), "Office seekers' directory", The Washington Standard, Olympia: McClatchy, p. 2, ISSN 2379-7339, LCCN sn84022770, OCLC 10580261
- Revels Cayton, Susie, ed. (November 16, 1900), "Washington's seventh legislature", Seattle Republican, Seattle: Republican Pub. Co., p. 1, ISSN 2157-3271, LCCN sn84025811, OCLC 10328970
- Revels Cayton, Susie, ed. (November 30, 1900), "Political pot-pie", Seattle Republican, Seattle: Republican Pub. Co., p. 3, ISSN 2157-3271, LCCN sn84025811, OCLC 10328970
- Murphy, John Miller, ed. (January 4, 1901), "Personnel of legislature", The Washington Standard, Olympia: McClatchy, p. 3, ISSN 2379-7339, LCCN sn84022770, OCLC 10580261
- "Tacoma", Seattle Post-Intelligencer, Seattle: Leigh S. J. Hunt, p. 6, January 7, 1901, ISSN 2379-7304, LCCN sn83045604, OCLC 9563195
- "Olympia", Seattle Post-Intelligencer, Seattle: Leigh S. J. Hunt, p. 6, January 11, 1901, ISSN 2379-7304, LCCN sn83045604, OCLC 9563195
- Murphy, John Miller, ed. (January 18, 1901), "State news", The Washington Standard, Olympia: McClatchy, p. 1, ISSN 2379-7339, LCCN sn84022770, OCLC 10580261
- Blethen, Alden J., ed. (March 23, 1901), "Tacoma council nominations", Seattle Daily Times, Seattle: The Seattle Times Company, p. 4, ISSN 2639-4898, LCCN sn86072007, OCLC 1765328
- "Republicans carry election in Tacoma", Seattle Post-Intelligencer, Seattle: Leigh S. J. Hunt, p. 8, April 3, 1901, ISSN 2379-7304, LCCN sn83045604, OCLC 9563195
- "City election in Tacoma", Spokane Chronicle, Spokane: Cowles Company, p. 4, April 3, 1901, LCCN sn86072020, OCLC 14374699
- Blethen, Alden J., ed. (May 28, 1901), "Tacoma city officers", Seattle Daily Times, Seattle: The Seattle Times Company, p. 4, ISSN 2639-4898, LCCN sn86072007, OCLC 1765328
- "To save the life of Boyce", Seattle Post-Intelligencer, Seattle: Leigh S. J. Hunt, p. 8, June 5, 1901, ISSN 2379-7304, LCCN sn83045604, OCLC 9563195
- "Hope for a short session", Seattle Post-Intelligencer, Seattle: Leigh S. J. Hunt, p. 2, June 9, 1901, ISSN 2379-7304, LCCN sn83045604, OCLC 9563195
- "May lose trial by jury", Seattle Post-Intelligencer, Seattle: Leigh S. J. Hunt, p. 7, July 12, 1901, ISSN 2379-7304, LCCN sn83045604, OCLC 9563195
- Blethen, Alden J., ed. (August 12, 1902), "Tacoma republicans active", Seattle Daily Times, Seattle: The Seattle Times Company, p. 8, ISSN 2639-4898, LCCN sn86072007, OCLC 1765328
- Blethen, Alden J., ed. (August 19, 1902), "Tacoma news", Seattle Daily Times, Seattle: The Seattle Times Company, p. 8, ISSN 2639-4898, LCCN sn86072007, OCLC 1765328
- Revels Cayton, Susie, ed. (September 5, 1902), "Delegates state convention", Seattle Republican, vol. IX, no. 14, Seattle: Republican Pub. Co., p. 1, ISSN 2157-3271, LCCN sn84025811, OCLC 10328970
- "Men lining up", Seattle Post-Intelligencer, Seattle: Leigh S. J. Hunt, p. 8, March 12, 1903, ISSN 2379-7304, LCCN sn83045604, OCLC 9563195
- "Primary is held", Seattle Post-Intelligencer, Seattle: Leigh S. J. Hunt, p. 8, March 27, 1903, ISSN 2379-7304, LCCN sn83045604, OCLC 9563195
- "Will name ticket", Seattle Post-Intelligencer, Seattle: Leigh S. J. Hunt, p. 8, March 28, 1903, ISSN 2379-7304, LCCN sn83045604, OCLC 9563195
- Blethen, Alden J., ed. (March 29, 1903), "Nominated for Councilmen", Seattle Daily Times, Seattle: The Seattle Times Company, p. 15, ISSN 2639-4898, LCCN sn86072007, OCLC 1765328
- "Are nominated by convention", Seattle Post-Intelligencer, Seattle: Leigh S. J. Hunt, p. 14, March 29, 1903, ISSN 2379-7304, LCCN sn83045604, OCLC 9563195
- "Tacoma city election today", Seattle Post-Intelligencer, Seattle: Leigh S. J. Hunt, p. 8, April 7, 1903, ISSN 2379-7304, LCCN sn83045604, OCLC 9563195
- Roys, L. W., ed. (1905), Revised charter and ordinances of the city of Tacoma, Washington (PDF), Tacoma: Allen & Lamborn Printing Co., OCLC 62569342
- Wickersham, James, ed. (1906), "U. S. Commissioners", Alaska Reports, vol. 2, Saint Paul: West Publishing Company, pp. ix, LCCN sv90014301, OCLC 1128137828
- "Receipts and disbursements of the Alaska Historical Library and Museum fund for the year ended September 30, 1907", Report of the Governor of Alaska to the Secretary of the Interior, Washington: Government Publishing Office, pp. 19–21, 1907, LCCN sn94095383, OCLC 33200449
- "Official Directory", Report of the Governor of Alaska to the Secretary of the Interior, Washington: Government Publishing Office, pp. 22–25, 1907, LCCN sn94095383, OCLC 33200449
- "Notary-public commissions issued or in force from July 1, 1906, to September 30, 1907", Report of the Governor of Alaska to the Secretary of the Interior, Washington: Government Publishing Office, pp. 27–29, 1907, LCCN sn94095383, OCLC 33200449
- Harrison, E. S., ed. (1909), "Territorial Officers of Alaska: United States Commissioners", Alaska Almanac, Seattle: The Harrison publishing company, pp. 149–150, LCCN 09028963, OCLC 34247696
- "Alaska girl is chosen librarian", The Spokesman-Review, Spokane: Cowles Company, p. 7, September 7, 1910, ISSN 1064-7317, LCCN sn84024754, OCLC 11102610
- Blethen, Alden J., ed. (March 27, 1912), "Unlawful agreement charged to claimants", Seattle Daily Times, Seattle: The Seattle Times Company, p. 14, ISSN 2639-4898, LCCN sn86072007, OCLC 1765328
- Blethen, Alden J., ed. (June 11, 1914), "First coal here from Matanuska", Seattle Daily Times, Seattle: The Seattle Times Company, p. 16, ISSN 2639-4898, LCCN sn86072007, OCLC 1765328
- A South Dakota Guide, American guide series (1 ed.), Pierre: State Publishing Company, 1938, LCCN 39008746, OCLC 891931
- Charles, Sidney (October 12, 1911), Blethen, Alden J. (ed.), "Pathetic story told in struggle made by pioneers of Katalla", Seattle Daily Times, Seattle: The Seattle Times Company, p. 9, ISSN 2639-4898, LCCN sn86072007, OCLC 1765328
- Hunt, Herbert (1916), Tacoma its history and its builders; a half century of activity, vol. 1, Chicago: S. J. Clarke Publishing Company, LCCN 18005073, OCLC 656923949
- Merk, John; Shenkenberg, Theodore (September 18, 1885), "Sioux Falls", Bismarck Weekly Tribune, Bismarck: Bismarck Tribune Co., p. 5, ISSN 2330-5878, LCCN sn84022129, OCLC 506459348
- Prosser, William Farrand (1903), Lewis, Edward Gardner (ed.), A history of the Puget Sound country, its resources, its commerce and its people, New York City: Edward Gardner Lewis, LCCN 05013767
- Wickersham, James; Callbreath, J. F.; Joslin, Falcon; Fisher, Walter L.; Fink, Albert; McDonald, T. P.; McKenzie, Donald A.; Schwartz, Henry H. (1913), Alaska coal lands: hearings before the Committee on the Territories, House of Representatives, on Alaska coal lands, Washington: Government Publishing Office, LCCN 44023942, OCLC 31113397
