= Susan Cayton Woodson =

American art collector and activist

Susan Cayton Woodson (October 18, 1918 – January 31, 2013) was an American art collector and activist. A central figure in the Chicago Black Renaissance, she was critical in promoting and collecting works by black artists, such as William McBride, Eldzier Cortor, and Charles White.

== Biography ==
Woodson was born in Seattle, Washington, United States. The great-granddaughter of U.S. Senator Hiram Rhodes Revels, she was raised by her grandparents, journalists and news paper founders, Horace R. Cayton Sr. and Susie Revels Cayton. Woodson was educated at Washington State College and moved to Chicago at the age of 22, accompanied by her family friend and Harlem Renaissance figure, Paul Robeson. In Chicago, Woodson first worked at Supreme Liberty Life Insurance Company and the Amalgamated Clothing Workers Union. In 1949, she married Harold W. Woodson Sr., a chemist for the Illinois Department of Agriculture and the Illinois Department of Public Health. She died on January 31, 2013.

== Career and legacy ==
In 1930, Woodson became a member of the South Side Community Art Center, later becoming a board member. During her tenure, she befriend visual artists, writers, and activists critical in the WPA and the Chicago Black Renaissance. Woodson's expansive network included playwright Theodore Ward and novelist Richard Wright, two early contributors to the burgeoning arts movement in the city. Her art collection, which includes a framed poem by Langston Hughes and paintings by William McBride and Eldzier Cortor, served as the foundation of the Susan Woodson Gallery. Woodson ran her gallery from her Hyde Park apartment while also overseeing exhibitions on Henry Ossawa Tanner and "Sapphire and Crystals: An Exhibition of African American Woman Artists," at the South Side Community Art Center. In addition to her work promoting black visual artists, Woodson promoted literary and community organizations, serving as board member at Parkway Community House and helping found the Vivian G. Harsh Society.
