= Ida Revels Redmond =

American politician (1873–1914)

- Born: Ida Alcorn Revels; 19 May 1873 or 19 July 1873; Mississippi, United States
- Died: 21 May 1914 or 23 May 1914 (aged 41)
- Education: Rust University
- Occupation(s): Teacher, women's organizer
- Spouse: Sidney Dillon Redmond
- Children: 2, including Sidney Revels Redmond
- Father: Hiram R. Revels
- Relatives: Susie Revels Cayton (sister)

Ida Alcorn Revels Redmond (19 May or July 1873 – 21 or 23 May 1914) was an American teacher and women's organizer in Mississippi. She encouraged self-improvement efforts through civic, education and social services. Her father was Hiram Revels, the first African American to represent Mississippi in the U.S. Congress, from 1870 to 1871.

Ida Revels married Sidney Dillon Redmond (1871–1948), a local physician turned lawyer and businessman. Their son Sidney Revels Redmond became an NAACP lawyer. They also had a daughter Esther.

Ida and her husband studied at Rust University (now Rust College).

Ida Revels Redmond died in May 1914, aged 41. Her grave, including a statue of her, is at the Mount Olive Cemetery in Jackson, Hinds County, Mississippi. The statue was restored by Jackson State University in 2018.
