= Tipton, Iowa =

- City
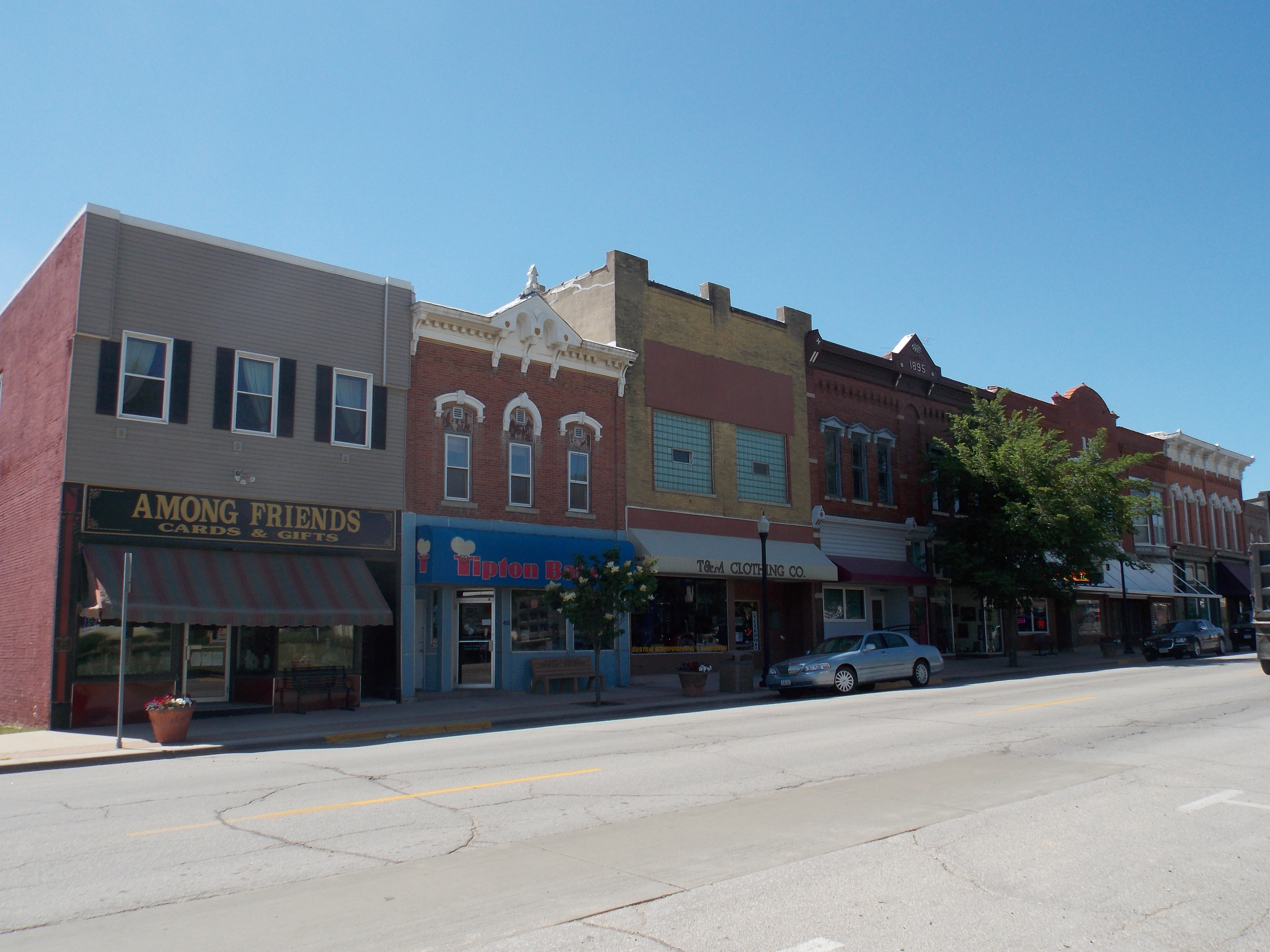
- Part of the commercial district of Tipton, Iowa
- Motto: "Where Dreams Happen!"
- Location of Tipton, Iowa
- Coordinates: 41°46′13″N 91°07′23″W
- Country: United States
- State: Iowa
- County: Cedar

Area
  - Total: 2.02 sq mi (5.24 km^{2})
  - Land: 2.02 sq mi (5.24 km^{2})
  - Water: 0 sq mi (0.00 km^{2})
- Elevation: 824 ft (251 m)

Population (2020)
  - Total: 3,149
  - Density: 1,560/sq mi (601/km^{2})
- Time zone: UTC-6 (Central (CST))
  - Summer (DST): UTC-5 (CDT)
- ZIP code: 52772
- Area code: 563
- FIPS code: 19-78285
- GNIS feature ID: 2397029
- Website: www.tiptoniowa.org

Tipton (/ˈtɪptən/) is a city in Cedar County, Iowa, United States. The population was 3,149 at the time of the 2020 census. It is the county seat of Cedar County.

== History ==
Tipton was platted within Center Township in 1840 and was named for General John Tipton, a personal friend of the founder, Henry W. Higgins. The city was incorporated on January 27, 1857.

=== Railroad history ===
Tipton was continually bypassed by Iowa railroads, beginning with the collapse of the Lyons Iowa Central RR in 1854. The Iowa Southwestern RR, organized in 1870, planned to connect with the Chicago & North Western to the north but failed, even with the help of the Chicago Burlington & Quincy and considerable construction activity. Meanwhile, the Tipton & Stanwood RR, organized in 1858, had been unsuccessfully trying for years to connect with the Chicago Iowa & Nebraska RR, building from Clinton to Cedar Rapids. The CI&N was, in fact, the road that had by the 1870s become the C&NW, 8.5 miles to the north of Tipton.

Finally, in 1872, the C&NW decided to assist the T&S and make the connection. Col. James Henry Howe, General Manager of the C&NW, notified Isaac B Howe, Supt. of the Iowa Div. by telegraph:

Green Bay 29 I.B. Howe [no relation],

We have substantially concluded building the Tipton branch. Can you make the survey and estimates at once, or set somebody at it?

J. H. Howe

"The first train of cars arrived at Tipton on Thanksgiving Day, 1872."

== Geography ==
According to the United States Census Bureau, the city has a total area of 2.09 square miles (5.41 km^{2}), all land.

== Demographics ==
Tipton historical population
Year	Pop.	±%
1850	252	—
1860	1,190	+372.2%
1870	1,246	+4.7%
1880	1,299	+4.3%
1890	1,599	+23.1%
1900	2,513	+57.2%
1910	2,048	−18.5%
1920	2,142	+4.6%
1930	2,145	+0.1%
1940	2,518	+17.4%
1950	2,633	+4.6%
1960	2,862	+8.7%
1970	2,877	+0.5%
1980	3,055	+6.2%
1990	2,998	−1.9%
2000	3,155	+5.2%
2010	3,221	+2.1%
2020	3,149	−2.2%
Source: "U.S. Census website". United States Census Bureau. Source: U.S. Decennial Census

=== 2020 census ===
As of the 2020 census, Tipton had a population of 3,149, with 1,349 households and 770 families residing in the city. The population density was 1,556.6 inhabitants per square mile (601.0/km^{2}), and there were 1,505 housing units at an average density of 743.9 per square mile (287.2/km^{2}).

The median age was 44.4 years. 23.1% of residents were under 18. By broader age group, 25.2% of residents were under the age of 20; 4.1% were from 20 to 24; 21.5% were from 25 to 44; 24.5% were from 45 to 64; and 24.8% were 65 years of age or older. For every 100 females, there were 89.6 males, and for every 100 females age 18 and over, there were 88.4 males age 18 and over. The gender makeup of the city was 47.3% male and 52.7% female.

Of the 1,349 households, 27.0% had children under the age of 18 living in them. Of all households, 44.0% were married-couple households, 7.7% were cohabiting couple households, 19.2% were households with a male householder and no spouse or partner present, and 29.1% were households with a female householder and no spouse or partner present. About 42.9% of households were non-families, 36.4% of all households were made up of individuals, and 19.1% had someone living alone who was 65 years of age or older.

There were 1,505 housing units, of which 10.4% were vacant. The homeowner vacancy rate was 3.4%, and the rental vacancy rate was 13.9%.

0.0% of residents lived in urban areas, while 100.0% lived in rural areas.

Racial composition as of the 2020 census
Race	Number	Percent
White	2,972	94.4%
Black or African American	18	0.6%
American Indian and Alaska Native	15	0.5%
Asian	7	0.2%
Native Hawaiian and Other Pacific Islander	0	0.0%
Some other race	29	0.9%
Two or more races	108	3.4%
Hispanic or Latino (of any race)	83	2.6%

=== 2010 census ===
At the 2010 census there were 3,221 people, 1,394 households, and 842 families living in the city. The population density was 1,541.1 inhabitants per square mile (595.0/km^{2}). There were 1,510 housing units at an average density of 722.5 per square mile (279.0/km^{2}). The racial makeup of the city was 97.9% White, 0.3% African American, 0.2% Native American, 0.3% Asian, 0.1% Pacific Islander, 0.2% from other races, and 1.0% from two or more races. Hispanics or Latinos of any race were 1.4%.

Of the 1,394 households, 29.4% had children under the age of 18 living with them, 48.6% were married couples living together, 8.6% had a female householder with no husband present, 3.2% had a male householder with no wife present, and 39.6% were non-families. 35.4% of households were one person, and 17.9% were one person aged 65 or older. The average household size was 2.25, and the average family size was 2.90.

The median age was 42.3 years. 24.2% of residents were under the age of 18; 5.9% were between the ages of 18 and 24; 23.6% were from 25 to 44; 25.5% were from 45 to 64; and 20.8% were 65 or older. The gender makeup of the city was 48.3% male and 51.7% female.

=== 2000 census ===
At the 2000 census, there were 3,155 people, 1,334 households, and 868 families living in the city. The population density was 1,732.2 inhabitants per square mile (668.8/km^{2}). There were 1,404 housing units at an average density of 770.8 per square mile (297.6/km^{2}). The racial makeup of the city was 98.61% White, 0.35% African American, 0.03% Native American, 0.32% Asian, 0.06% from other races, and 0.63% from two or more races. Hispanics or Latinos of any race were 1.08%.

Of the 1,334 households, 29.5% had children under the age of 18 living with them, 53.6% were married couples living together, 8.2% had a female householder with no husband present, and 34.9% were non-families. 31.1% of households were one person, and 16.6% were one person aged 65 or older. The average household size was 2.31, and the average family size was 2.87.

23.6% are under the age of 18, 7.3% from 18 to 24, 26.6% from 25 to 44, 21.6% from 45 to 64, and 20.9% 65 or older. The median age was 40 years. For every 100 females, there were 93.4 males. For every 100 females aged 18 and over, there were 88.6 males.

The median household income was $36,778, and the median family income was $45,698. Males had a median income of $34,464 versus $21,596 for females. The per capita income for the city was $17,494. About 2.9% of families and 7.0% of the population were below the poverty line, including 6.4% of those under age 18 and 9.4% of those age 65 or over.

== Education ==
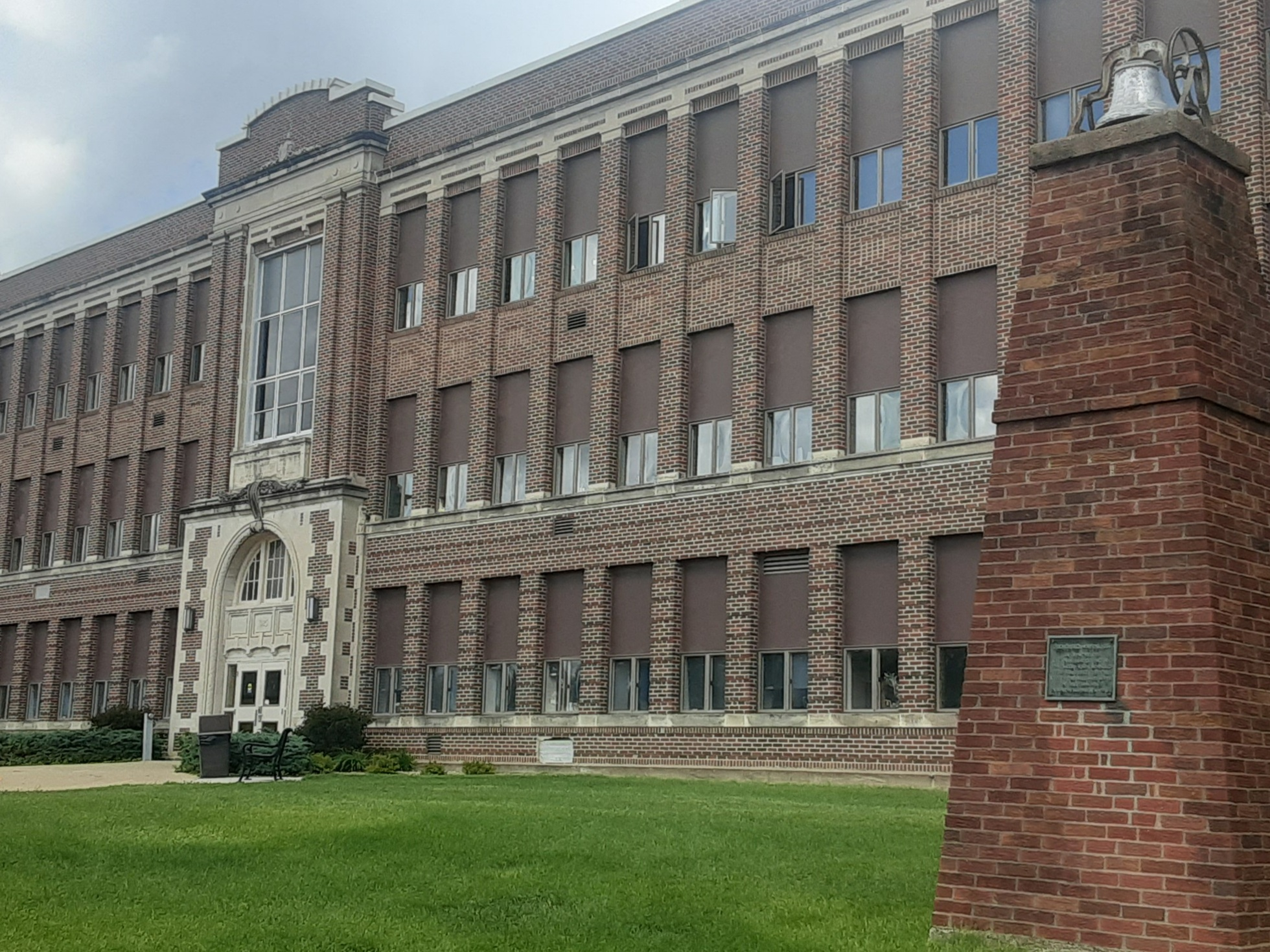
Tipton High School on Plum Street

The Tipton Community School District operates local public schools in two separate buildings: one serving PK through grade 8, the other serving grades 9-12. The district enrolls roughly 977 students and has 144 staff members.

== Infrastructure ==
=== Transportation ===
Tipton is served by two highways: Iowa 38 (which runs north and south through town) and Iowa 130 (which enters Tipton from the east, meets Iowa 38 in the business district, and then runs north in conjunction).

While Tipton is no longer served by any railroads, it was served by two railroads in the past. The Chicago & Northwestern served Tipton via a spur line from Stanwood to the north. The tracks were removed in the 1970s. Tipton was also served by a branch of the Chicago, Rock Island and Pacific Railroad (Rock Island) from Iowa City to Bennett and beyond. This line ran east and west through the southern part of Tipton and was abandoned in the 1950s. Evidence of this abandoned right-of-way can still be seen in a few places in Tipton.

== Notable people ==
- George Crawford Britton, South Dakota and Washington state politician.
- Dick Dickinson, actor.
- William M. Furnish, paleontologist.
- Bertha Lum, who pioneered the use of Japanese art techniques in the U.S.
- Gus Monckmeier, racing car driver.
- Daria O'Neill, radio and television personality.
- Frank Kinney Holbrook, first African American athlete to play on a major collegiate football team.

== See also ==
- Cedar County Sheriff's House and Jail
- Iowa Cow War
