= Cedar County Sheriff's House and Jail =

Historic government buildings in Iowa, United States

- U.S. National Register of Historic Places
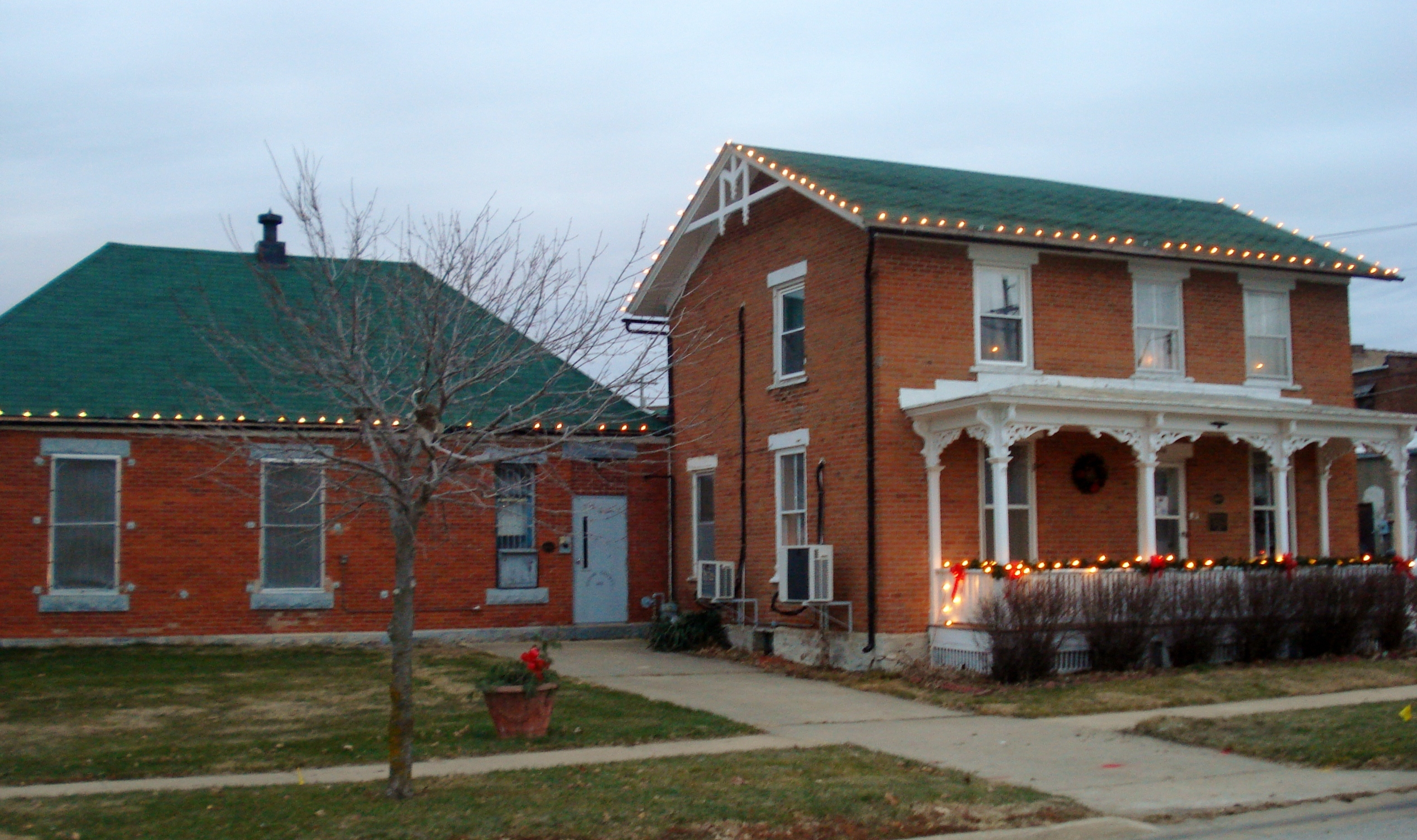

- Location within Iowa Location within the United States
- Location: 118 W. 4th St. Tipton, Iowa
- Coordinates: 41°46′09″N 91°07′45″W
- Architect: Frank Nachbar; John Leefers
- Architectural style: Late Victorian
- MPS: Municipal, County and State Corrections Properties MPS
- NRHP reference No.: 03000913
- Added to NRHP: September 13, 2003

Cedar County Sheriff's House and Jail are historic buildings located in Tipton, Iowa, United States. The facility was known as a “Mom and Pop Jail.” The sheriff's wife, who was Mom, did the cooking and the sheriff, or a deputy, was Pop and provided supervision and administration. It is thought to be the last jail and residence combination still in use when it closed in 2001. The buildings were constructed in brick and were listed on the National Register of Historic Places in 2003 as a part of the Municipal, County and State Corrections Properties MPS.
