= Mount Olive Cemetery (Jackson, Mississippi) =

Historic cemetery in Hinds County, Mississippi

- U.S. National Register of Historic Places
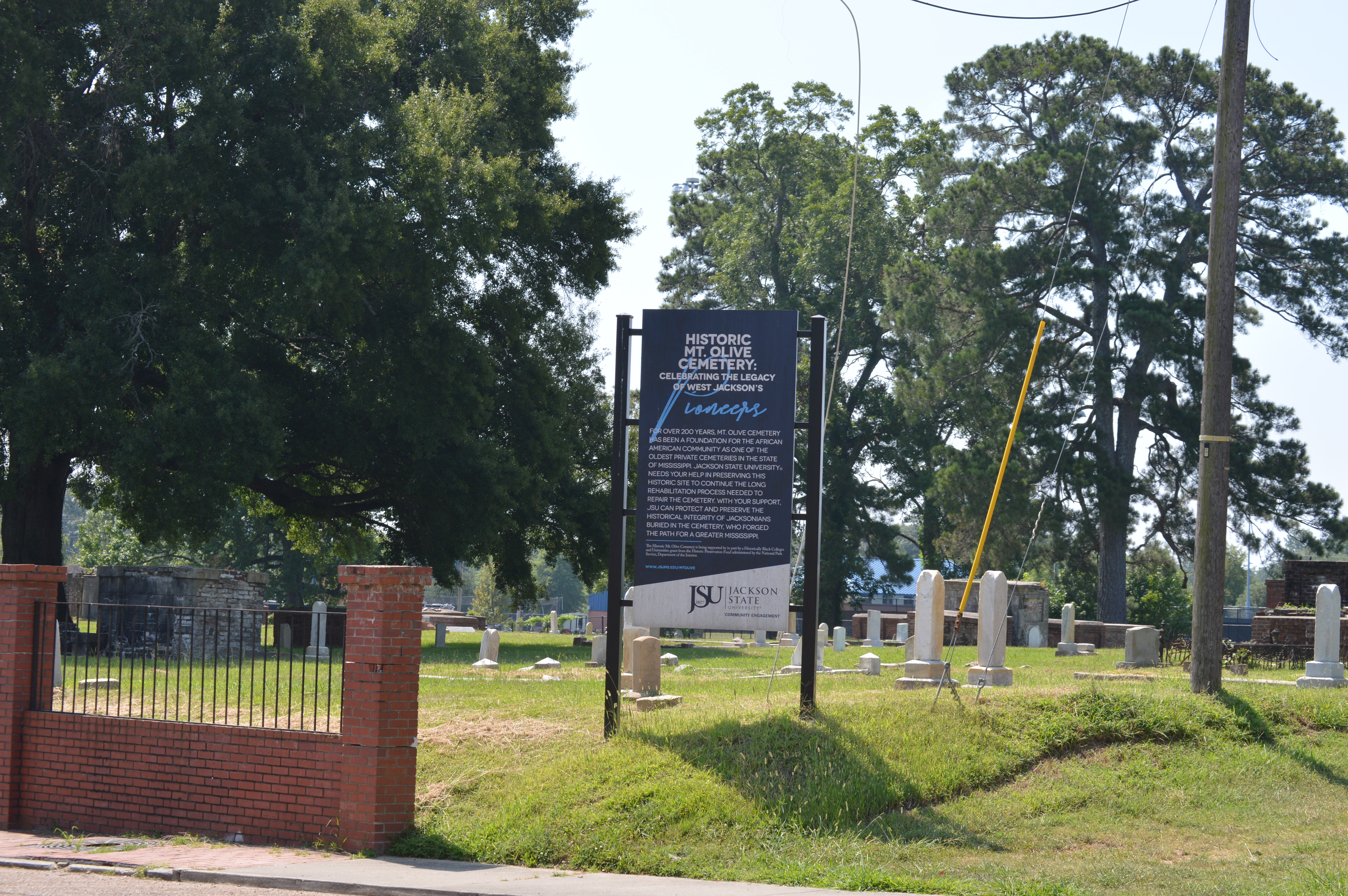
- Location: Jackson, Mississippi
- Coordinates: 32°17′48″N 90°12′12″W
- NRHP reference No.: 100001028

Mount Olive Cemetery is a historic burial ground for African Americans in Jackson, Mississippi. It was listed on the National Register of Historic Places in 2017.

== History ==
The earliest burial in Mount Olive Cemetery was in 1807. Mount Olive served the African American community of Jackson, with the majority of burials occurring between 1900 and 1965. The cemetery has experienced years of neglect and some of the headstones have deteriorated as a result of this neglect. Since 2015, researchers from the adjacent Jackson State University have worked to document and restore the cemetery's history.

== Burials ==
- Ida Revels Redmond
- James Hill (Mississippi politician), state senator and organizer of churches and schools
