= The Seattle Republican =

Defunct African American newspaper from Seattle, Washington

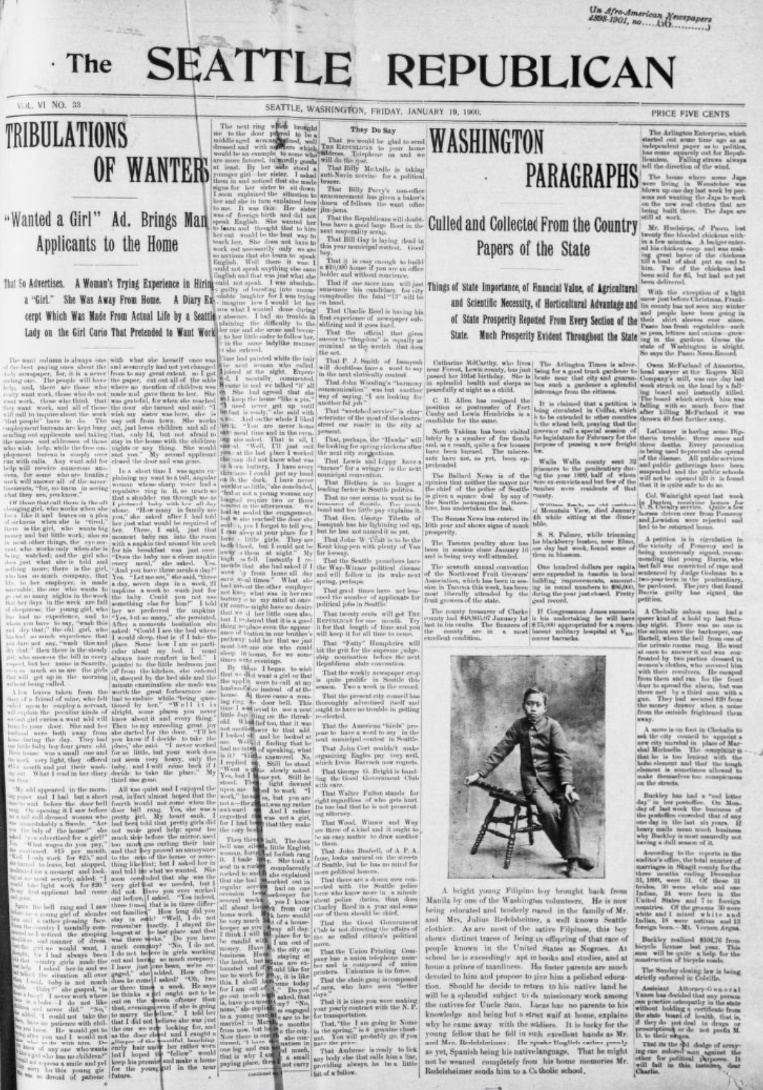
- The front page of the January 19, 1910 edition
- Type: Weekly newspaper
- Founder: Horace R. Cayton Sr.
- Founded: May 19, 1894; 132 years ago
- City: Seattle
- Country: United States
- ISSN: 2157-3271
- OCLC number: 10328970

The Seattle Republican was a weekly newspaper in Seattle from 1894 to 1913, and is considered Seattle's first successful African American newspaper.

== Founding and early years ==
The Seattle Republican was Seattle's second Black newspaper, after The Seattle Standard was founded by Brittain Oxendine in 1891. The founder of The Seattle Republican, Horace R. Cayton Sr., was formerly enslaved in the American South. Cayton moved to Seattle to work in journalism. He was a political reporter for Seattle's largest paper at the time, the Seattle Post-Intelligencer, and joined The Seattle Standard before it collapsed in 1893. In an attempt to start a successful paper that could appeal to both Black and white audiences, Cayton founded The Seattle Republican in 1894.

Cayton shared copies of the paper for years with Hiram Revels, a leading figure during Reconstruction. Revels was president of Cayton's alma mater, Alcorn College. Revels dictated his replies to his daughter Susie Sumner Revels, who also shared her own family news with Cayton.

Susie Revels began contributing to the paper in 1896 with an article on Booker T. Washington and the Atlanta Exposition. Cayton praised her skills in the paper, writing: "she gives every evidence of becoming a very forceful and effective writer and seems especially adapted to fiction and verse." Soon she moved to Seattle to marry Cayton and help with the paper. Susie was associate editor starting in 1900, becoming Seattle's first female newspaper editor. Both Caytons wrote for the paper, with Susie contributing articles and short stories.

Before racial discrimination and segregation spiked in Seattle in 1910, there were some opportunities for Black business owners to succeed by catering to Seattle's mostly white residents. Some Black settlers, like the Caytons, viewed Seattle as an unmolded frontier town with a heightened possibility of progress and economic opportunity. There were only 2,300 Black residents by 1910, but this was a large growth from the 400 Black residents in 1900. Additionally, the percentage of Seattle's Black residents who owned businesses was higher during its frontier period than in the 2000s.

== Content ==
The Seattle Republican catered to a general audience in Seattle, and due to city demographics it mostly had white readers. At one point it was the second-most popular newspaper in Seattle. The newspaper's scope and audience differed from that of Seattle's first Black newspaper, The Seattle Standard, which wrote to Seattle's Black community. The Seattle Republican sought to portray "the black race" in a positive manner and hoped to create harmony between races through open discussion of sensitive race issues. Some Black readers felt the paper catered too much to the white community in Seattle, and the paper shared some of the difficulties of catering to both communities in a 1906 piece called "Stop Your Paper".

The Seattle Republican published local politics and commentary targeted at a general audience, but also included news specifically from Seattle's Black community. It was the only paper on the West Coast to regularly receive cable and telegraph news from the press in New York, and it covered national politics in addition to its local reporting. Regular columns covered various aspects of the paper's reporting, from "Political Pot Pie" for local politics, to "Realm of Religion" for church reporting, and "Afro American" and "Brother in Black" for national news. The Seattle Times noted in 1909 that The Seattle Republican had not missed a single issue since it had started.

The paper's tone followed the Progressive Era Republican politics of the time, sharing an optimistic view and debating current events with opinionated arguments. Horace stated that it "stands for right, and champions the cause of the oppressed. The success of the Republican Party is one of its highest ambitions." This did not prevent it from critiquing some Republican policies. Horace frequently wrote about the struggle for equal rights locally and nationally. The Caytons advocated for Black people to move to the West in search of less explicit racial discrimination. The Seattle Republican dedicated coverage to local corruption and crime. The paper also covered topics relevant to other ethnic communities in the area, such as news about Seattle's Jewish population and advocacy for Japanese immigrants in California.

=== Selected pieces ===
In two editorials, Horace criticized the Hunter Tract Company for discriminating against a Black family, the Stones, who wanted to buy property in Mount Baker. The Stones fought the Hunter Tract Company in court and won, eventually building a house in the neighborhood in 1910. The Seattle Republican also published an opinion piece decrying a 1911 proposal to build Western Tuskegee, a planned community for Black settlers near the white community of Sultan. It opposed the new development on the grounds that the nearness of both segregated communities would increase racial strife, a view which was also shared by white members of Sultan who opposed the development. Lisa Labovitch, writing for HistoryLink, noted the strikingly racist logic underlying the opinion piece, questioning its motivation or if it was a satire.

In the editorial "Black Baby Dolls," Susie argued that psychological harm could arise from black children only playing with white baby dolls, and encouraged black families to either make their own dolls or push back against stores that refused to sell black dolls. She frequently wrote short stories concerning exotic themes, often with elements of wit or horror. Many of her stories had racially ambiguous characters or concerned universal human themes.

== Racial prejudice and closure ==
During the early 1900s, racial discrimination and violence grew in Seattle and the rest of the country. When Horace Cayton wrote against rising racial violence like lynchings and the Ku Klux Klan, he lost white readers and advertisers. White newspapers attacked Cayton for his advocacy as well, writing that his opposition to lynching was equal to an argument against protecting white women. White competitors also used "racial slurs, personal insults, and political innuendo" according to Richard S. Hobbs, a biographer of the Caytons.

Threats and lawsuits also affected The Seattle Republican via the Caytons. In an early incident, Horace was arrested in 1901 on the orders of Seattle's Chief of Police, W.L. Meredith, for his reporting. Horace later sued a restaurant that refused to serve him due to his race, but when the suit revealed an earlier conviction against him, it hurt his reputation–regardless of the unfairness of the conviction or the public outcry and governor's pardon he had received. During this period, the Caytons were also forced to move out of their prosperous neighborhood into the Central District, like many other Black families, due to forced segregation in Seattle.

Dropping support from white readers and mounting costs from civil lawsuits forced the newspaper to close. The Caytons had managed the paper until 1913.

=== Cayton's Weekly/Monthly ===
After rebuilding their funds, the Caytons founded Cayton's Weekly in 1916. The new paper was aimed more directly at a Black audience, while continuing to portray the accomplishments of Black people and the racial atrocities committed against them. It discussed local and national news, and its anti-lynching and civil rights advocacy again provoked backlash in Seattle's non-Black community. At the same time, two other Black newspapers grew more popular in Seattle: the Seattle Enterprise and Searchlight. Cayton's Weekly stopped in December 1920. Horace attempted to continue it as Cayton's Monthly in February 1921, but only published that paper for two months.

== Legacy ==
The Seattle Republican is part of the collection of the Library of Congress.

The house in Capitol Hill where the Caytons lived before they were forced to move to the Central District was designated a Seattle landmark in 2021.

The Seattle Republican is commemorated in a 2021 mural project, Routed in History: History Rides on Community Shoulders, by King County Metro and the Black Heritage Society of Washington State. One bus stop features historic local Black newspapers, including the Seattle Republican and the later Seattle Medium and The Facts.
