= Revels Cayton =

Union leader and civil rights activist (1907–1995)

- Born: 1907
- Died: November 4, 1995 (aged 87–88); San Francisco, California
- Education: University of Washington (dropout)
- Occupations: Union leader and civil rights activist
- Political party: Communist Party USA
- Relatives: Susie Revels Cayton (mother), Horace Cayton, Sr. (father), Hiram R. Revels (grandfather)

Revels Cayton (1907 – November 4, 1995) was an American union leader and civil rights activist active in the states of Washington and California.

== Early life ==
Born in 1907 to Susie Revels Cayton and Horace Cayton, Sr., his grandfather was Hiram R. Revels, the first black senator in the United States.

Cayton was forced to seek employment at age 15 as a telephone operator due to a series of unfortunate financial events. He attended the University of Washington, but dropped out due to the Great Depression. It was during his time at the University of Washington that he first was introduced to communism. In the 1930s, the Communist Party's primary concerns included workers' rights and racial tensions. In a letter to a friend, Cayton stated, "in the beginning I was drawn to the Party because I believed that in a socialist system there would be no racism." At some point in the 1930s, he moved from Seattle to San Francisco.

== Career and activism ==
Cayton was particularly active in 1934; during that year he joined the Northwest District of the Communist Party, organized the Communist Party's Seattle chapter of the League of Struggle for Negro Rights, and participated in the 1934 West Coast waterfront strike in San Francisco. In 1940, he filed a discrimination suit against a San Francisco restaurant that refused service to him, Paul Robeson, and five others.

In 1941, Cayton moved to Los Angeles where he became the director of the State Congress of Industrial Organizations (CIO) Minorities Commission and Vice President of the California State CIO Council. After this he moved to New York City where he served from 1945 to 1947 as the Executive Secretary of the National Negro Congress (NNC). Under his leadership the NNC petitioned the UN Director-General to recognize the "denial of constitutional rights to 13,000,000 U.S. Negroes."

Cayton returned to San Francisco in the 1950s.

In 1960, he was the first manager of St. Francis Square, a housing development in San Francisco built by the International Longshoremen's and Warehousemen's Union and the Pacific Maritime Association. Later he became the deputy director of the San Francisco Housing Authority and deputy mayor for social programs.

Cayton died on Saturday, November 4, 1995, in San Francisco, California.
