= Black Metropolis =

1945 nonfiction book by St. Clair Drake and Horace R. Cayton, Jr.

- Authors: St Clair Drake, and Horace Cayton
- Genre: Non-fiction
- Publisher: Harcourt, Brace and Company
- Publication date: 1945
- Publication place: United States
- Pages: 809
- OCLC: 186494767
- Followed by: updated and expanded editions

Black Metropolis: A Study of Negro Life in a Northern City, authored by St. Clair Drake and Horace R. Cayton, Jr., is an anthropological and sociological study of the African-American urban experience in the first half of the 20th century. Published in 1945, later expanded editions added some material relating to the 1950s and 1960s. Relying on massive research conducted in Chicago, primarily as part of a Works Progress Administration program, Drake and Cayton produced, according to the Encyclopedia of African American History, a "foundational text in African American history, cultural studies, and urban sociology."

== Synopsis ==
The original text begins with an introduction by novelist Richard Wright in which he relates some of the research to the themes of his work, particularly the novel, Native Son. The preface of the book, authored by Drake and Cayton, provides an overview of the Black Metropolis. The first section of the book then sketches the history of African-Americans in Chicago, up to the early years of the Great Migration, when millions of African-Americans left the Southern United States for Northern cities.

The book continues with explorations of the forces which created the separate Black Metropolis, and how the community related to the wider city. Chapters include "Breaking the Job Ceiling", "Black Workers and the New Unions", and "Democracy and Political Expediency", in which the power politics of the newly dynamic community over the wider society is explored. The book continues with a detailed portrait on the life of the community in such chapters as "The Power of the Press and the Pulpit", "Negro Business", and separate chapters on the upper, middle and lower classes of the community. The authors identify five overwhelming concerns of the entirety of the community—"staying alive, having a good time, praising God, getting ahead, and advancing the race." The final section of the book is a note by sociology professor W. Lloyd Warner on the book's methodology.

== Publication history ==
The book had its origins in a research project conceived by Warner at the University of Chicago with assistance from Cayton. With eventual government and other funding, twenty graduate students between 1935 and 1940, including Drake, worked as primary researchers. As many as 200 were employed as investigators, typists, and copyists of various field reports. Cayton was familiar with the high society of the respectable, and not-so-respectable, black elite, while Drake became intimately familiar with various voluntary organizations and working and lower class elements. After the project was completed, Warner thought it might be turned into a book for the university's academic press, but Cayton thought it would get a wider readership with a commercial publisher. Drake wrote most chapters of the book, while Cayton produced the remainder, and Warner, Cayton, and Drake acted as reviewers and editors. The publisher Harcourt, Brace and Company wanted Wright for the introduction, and Cayton, who knew Wright, was able to get him.

The book was expanded by Drake and Cayton in later editions in the 1950s and 1960s. It has been reissued by the University of Chicago Press in 1993 and 2015.

== Critical reception ==
In the American Sociological Review, Samuel Strong wrote, "[t]he style of the volume alternates between systematic analysis, literary excursions, and journalistic protest writing. In spite of any critical observations one may direct against this book, it represents a real contribution to the literature. ..." The reviewer for The Journal of Politics, Rosalind Lepawsky, noted the breadth of the book but found it confusing, and thought it was missing an emphasis on psychology and would benefit from a more popular treatment. Carter Woodson, writing in The Journal of Negro History, found the book a creditworthy and commendable effort.

== Criticism ==
Aimee Cox, in her 2015 study of a group of black girls in Detroit, states that although she was not interested in critiquing Black Metropolis, she denotes it as beginning a trend in urban sociology of focusing on the success of black men, and excluding black women. She also argues that the ideas of 'success' assumed in Black Metropolis for "advancing the race" are primarily economic and class based.

According to James N. Gregory, writing in 2007, the book emphasized physical segregation and social disorganization theory, tending to diminish the achievements of the Black community and "introduc(ing) the ghetto story that would guide (perceptions for) the next half century." Gregory also argues there is irony that the very concept of the "Black Metropolis," which had been a "celebratory terminology" among Black journalists, was eroded by the study because, in Gregory's view, the study emphasized the limits of urban Black life, rather than its achievements.

== Awards ==
1946: Anisfield-Wolf Book Award in nonfiction.

== See also ==
- Black Metropolis-Bronzeville District
- Chicago school (sociology)
