= Jeremiah M. P. Williams =

Mississippi politician

The Reverend Jeremiah M. P. Williams
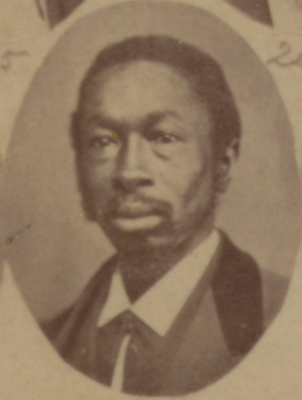
- Official portrait, 1874

Member of the Mississippi State Senate from the 4th district
- In office 1870–1880
- Preceded by: Hiram R. Revels
- Succeeded by: Albert H. Brenham

Personal details
- Died: June 24, 1884
- Party: Republican
- Occupation: Minister; politician

Jeremiah M. P. Williams (died June 24, 1884) was a Baptist preacher and state legislator in Mississippi. He served several terms in the Mississippi Senate during and after the Reconstruction era. He represented Adams County, Mississippi.

He was one of the incorporators of the Mississippi Printing and Publishing Company. In 1870 he was Corresponding Secretary of the Colored Missionary Baptist Convention. He was designated to give the introductory sermon at its 1876 meeting.

He died in Minorville, Mississippi.

== See also ==
- African American officeholders from the end of the Civil War until before 1900
