= Cayton Guard Station =

- U.S. National Register of Historic Places
- Location within Colorado
- Location: Forest Service Road 814.1, in vicinity of Silt, Colorado
- Coordinates: 39.305614°N 107.564752°W
- Area: less than one acre
- Built: 1910
- Built by: James G. Cayton; Jolly Boone Robinson
- Architectural style: pioneer log
- NRHP reference No.: 05000335
- Added to NRHP: April 27, 2005

The Cayton Guard Station or Cayton Ranger Station, in White River National Forest about 18 miles (29 km) south of Silt, Colorado, was built in 1910. It was listed on the National Register of Historic Places in 2005.

It includes a three-room log cabin.

Its preservation is supported by the Cayton Ranger Station Foundation.
