= St. Clair Drake =

African-American sociologist (1911–1990)

- Born: John Gibbs St. Clair Drake; January 2, 1911; Suffolk, Virginia, U.S.
- Died: June 15, 1990 (aged 79); Palo Alto, California, U.S.
- Awards: Anisfield-Wolf Book Award, 1946; Bronislaw Malinowski Award, 1990

Academic background
- Education: Hampton University; University of Chicago

Academic work
- Main interests: African-American studies, African studies
- Notable works: Black Metropolis: A Study of Negro Life in a Northern City (1945)
- Influenced: Franklin Rosemont

John Gibbs St. Clair Drake (January 2, 1911 – June 15, 1990) was an African-American sociologist and anthropologist whose scholarship and activism led him to document much of the social turmoil of the 1960s, establish some of the first Black Studies programs in American universities, and contribute to the independence movement in Ghana. Drake often wrote about challenges and achievements in race relations as a result of his extensive research.

While studying at University of Chicago, in 1945 Drake co-authored with Horace R. Cayton, Jr. the work Black Metropolis: A Study of Negro Life in a Northern City, a landmark study of race and urban life. Drake was one of the first African-American faculty members at Roosevelt University in Chicago, at a time when academic opportunities for Black scholars were usually limited to historically black colleges and universities. He continued his research while a professor at Roosevelt for 23 years, before leaving to found the African and African American Studies program at Stanford University.

A major element in Drake's career was an interest in Africa and the pan-African movement, which sprang from his dissertation work with immigrants from Africa living in the United Kingdom, and was expanded upon during his later research projects conducted in West Africa. Ultimately he spent years working in the newly independent country of Ghana as an academic and an informal advisor to the national government there, before his return to the United States and his academic career in that country.

== Early life and education ==
John Gibbs St. Clair Drake was born in Suffolk, Virginia, on January 2, 1911. Later in life, including professionally, he went by his last name only, St. Clair Drake. His father immigrated to the United States from Barbados in the British West Indies, becoming a Baptist minister and an international organizer for Marcus Garvey's Universal Negro Improvement Association. His father's devout religious faith did not allow for activities like dancing, going to the movies, or using playing cards, all of which were forbidden to Drake in his childhood. Drake's mother, Bessie Lee, was a native of Staunton, Virginia. When Drake was two years old, the family moved to Harrisburg, Virginia, when his father decided it would be best for the family to join the many African Americans who were then moving northward. During his childhood, St. Clair lived in a multi-ethnic neighborhood. He recalled that his understanding of race and prejudice was vague, but at least one of his fights occurred when he was insulted about the color of his skin.

Drake attended elementary school in Pittsburgh, Pennsylvania, where he remained through the 7th grade. He then returned to Virginia to attend high school. He inevitably learned "the facts of Southern life", and in his first contact with the Negro press, he remarked: "It was rather exciting, this learning that one is a Negro and what it means – also rather frustrating." At this time, with the encouragement of his teachers, he began to write poetry, generally about nature. That same year, he also edited the school yearbook. He completed high school in three years.

In 1927, Drake left Staunton, Virginia, to attend Hampton Institute (now Hampton University). Hampton's appeal, according to Drake, was its offer to allow students to work their way through college. Drake met the cost of his education by working as a waiter and then as a front desk clerk at the Holly Tree Guesthouse. Both of these forms of employment were segregated jobs, intended only for black workers. Drake was almost immediately dissatisfied with the faculty's "civilizing mission" attitude, which he attributed to the intellectual legacy of Booker T. Washington, and he complained that the institute's faculty did not include any African Americans among its full professors. Drake and other Hampton students engaged in a strike beginning on October 9, 1927, only a few weeks after Drake arrived on campus. While the list of student demands exceeded sixty specific points, many of them dealt with the need for more black teachers, higher academic standards, the dismissal of racist and unqualified faculty, an end to various strict disciplinary policies, and amnesty for those involved in the strike. Due to the intervention of administrators and parents, the strike ended in defeat. But as scholar Andrew Rosa concluded, the "administration lost the war." Many reforms eventually became implemented, and Drake flourished at the college over the next three years there. In the course of his studies at Hampton, Drake served as the president of the student body, led the college chapter of the Association for the Study of Negro Life and History, became the editor of the Hampton Script, and even played on the college's soccer team. He graduated from Hampton in 1931 with a B.S. degree in biology and a minor in English.

== Career as an academic ==
From 1932 to 1933, Drake was on the faculty of the Christiansburg Institute, an African-American trade high school in Christiansburg, Virginia. At the Christiansburg Institute, he taught a variety of subjects, coached soccer, led chapel prayer, and began to write professionally. During this time Drake continued pursuing his interests in academic and social justice pursuits at Pendle Hill, a Quaker retreat and graduate center.

Drake worked as an instructor at Dillard University in New Orleans from 1935 to 1937. In 1935, Drake also joined a research team led by Allison Davis, a former colleague from Howard University. The anthropological research explored the caste system of the American south, and they later published their observations in the book Deep South: A Social Anthropological Study of Caste and Class. Drake was moved by the potential that social science could have in racial causes, and ultimately followed Davis to study anthropology as a doctoral student at the University of Chicago. During the late 1930s in Chicago, Drake worked as the assistant director for the Illinois State Commission on the Condition of the Urban Colored Population, and conducted research in churches serving Chicago's black community. He returned briefly to Dillard in 1940 to work as an assistant professor, but was dismissed in the following year for supporting a student strike, and subsequently returned to his studies at Chicago. At the outset of World War II, as a graduate student in Chicago, he led an organization called Conscientious Objectors Against Jim Crow that urged African-Americans draftees to claim conscientious objector status on the basis of their opposition to segregation and discrimination in the armed forces.

=== After World War II ===
After World War II, he was the co-author, with Horace R. Cayton, Jr., of Black Metropolis, a study of the lives of African Americans living in Bronzeville, a neighborhood on Chicago's South Side. The book was characterized in Drake's obituary in the New York Times as "a landmark of objective research and one of the best urban studies produced by American scholarship". Drake became one of the more prolific chroniclers, in books and scholarly articles, of the turmoil and development of race relations in the 1960s. In 1946, Drake became an assistant professor of sociology at Roosevelt University along with chemist Edward Marion Augustus Chandler, modern dancer Sybil Shearer, and sociologist Rose Hum Lee. He remained a member of the Roosevelt sociology department until 1968. He commented years later that the offer to join Roosevelt came as "a surprise". He fully expected only to be considered by "Negro" colleges of the time. He found a home at Roosevelt which he embraced as an "experimental institution" where he was able to develop his calling as an "activist anthropologist". He was perhaps the most distinguished faculty member ever to have taught at Roosevelt University, and was also one of the first black faculty members at Roosevelt. While there, he created one of the first African American Studies programs in the United States. Among his many honors, he received an honorary degree from Roosevelt. Drake taught at Roosevelt for 23 years before leaving in 1969 to found the African and African American Studies program at Stanford University. He remained at Stanford until his retirement in 1976.

=== Two years in the United Kingdom ===
Drake spent nearly two years in the United Kingdom, 1947–1948. He conducted his dissertation research in 1947 in Cardiff, Wales, where he studied a community of African seamen and their Welsh families. In "Value Systems, Social Structure and Race Relations in the British Isles," Drake "examined the forms of social action that arose in response to British racial and colonial domination". At this time, he was one of the first scholars studying race relations in the British Isles and was considered one of the foremost scholars on the subject. Kenneth Little published his Ph.D. thesis, Negroes in Britain, which was a study of the Black and minority ethnic communities of Cardiff. Drake worked with the Black community of Cardiff, drafting a response in which the local community said they "distrust people who survey us and study us, who write about us and publicize us, and who try to reform and lead us."

=== After retirement ===
Even after his retirement from the faculty at Stanford, Drake remained active as a scholar and author. Another of Drake's works, which demonstrates his continued interest in race relations throughout his career, was Black Folk Here and There: An Essay in History and Anthropology, published in two volumes in 1987 and 1990 as part of a series entitled Afro-American Culture and Society. One of Drake's former students characterizes his research as drawing heavily from urban sociology and history, which led his peers in the 1940s to see "his scholarship ... [as] more sociological than anthropological" and "virtually ignored within anthropology as a consequence."

== Contributions to the Pan-African movement ==
Drake's connections to the African continent began early in his academic career. He met Kwame Nkrumah, George Padmore, and Mbiyu Koinange when he was completing his fieldwork in Cardiff, Wales as a part of his dissertation at Chicago. As a result of this early contact with pan-African advocates, Drake pursued research projects in Liberia and Ghana in the 1950s, funded in part by a grant he received from the Ford Foundation. From 1958 to 1961, Drake served as head of the department of sociology at the University of Ghana. Drake's connections allowed him to participate in increasingly important discussions connected to the newly independent nation of Ghana. At the request of George Padmore, Nkrumah's advisor, Drake presented and participated in the planning meetings for the All-African Peoples' Conference held at Accra in December 1958. Padmore's relationship with Drake "allowed Drake to acquire unrivaled knowledge of Ghana's political leaders." Drake served as an informal adviser to leaders of several newly independent African nations in the early 1960s, particularly Nkrumah, who by this time had become Ghana's prime minister, but later chose to leave Africa and this political work after coups installed military leaders in many of these nations: Drake later remarked that he would not "work under generals."

Drake's personal commitment to see Ghana succeed and his concerns about the privacy of the people and conversations he observed led him to elect not to publish books or articles based directly on his work in Africa or with African immigrants in Britain. However, he did conduct several research studies during his time in Africa with his wife sociologist Elizabeth Dewey Johns, though these were not directly associated with his political or personal connections in the countries he visited.

Drake was also able to further social interest in African countries through his work with the Peace Corps. He provided cultural sensitivity training for a group of 50 American students planning to work in Ghana.

== Personal life ==
St. Clair Drake was married to a colleague, Elizabeth Dewey Johns. Johns was a graduate student in sociology at the University of Chicago when Drake began work there as a graduate student in anthropology. As a fellow student, she helped introduce Drake to theories connected with cultural and behavioral relativism. Each earned a Ph.D. After their marriage, the two of them worked together conducting research in West Africa. The couple raised two children, Sandra and Karl. During World War II, Drake was a conscientious objector in response to the U.S. military's segregation policies, and he served in a civilian capacity in the U.S. Maritime Service.

== Legacy and awards ==
- Roosevelt University dedicated a research center to Drake's memory, The St. Clair Drake Center for African and African American Studies, which follows Drake's social activist model to document and explore "contributions, challenges and conditions of Africans and African Americans."
- Stanford University dedicated the St. Clair Drake Lectures to his memory.
- Recipient of the Anisfield-Wolf Book Award, 1946
- Recipient of the Dubois-Johnson-Frazier award, 1973
- Recipient of the Bronislaw Malinowski Award, 1990

== Selected works ==
Thesis

- "Value Systems, Social Structure and Race Relations in the British Isles", University of Chicago (Ph.D., Anthropology), 1954

Books

- Churches and Voluntary Associations Among Negroes in Chicago, 1940
- Black Metropolis: A Study of Negro Life in a Northern City, with Horace R. Cayton, 1945, revised 1962, revised 1970
- Social Work in West Africa, with Dr. Peter Omari, 1963
- Race Relations in a Time of Rapid Social Change, 1966
- Black Religion and the Redemption of Africa, 1971
- Black Folks Here and There: An Essay in History and Anthropology (2 vols), 1987 and 1990

Pamphlets

- The American Dream and the Negro: 100 Years of Freedom?, The Emancipation Centennial Lectures Given at Roosevelt University, 1963
- Our Urban Poor: Promises to Keep and Miles to Go, with an introduction by Bayard Rustin, 1967
- Black Religion and the Redemption of Africa, 1971

== See also ==
- Bronislaw Malinowski Award
