= George Britton (cricketer) =

English cricketer

George Britton (7 February 1843 – 3 January 1910) was an English first-class cricketer, who played one match for Yorkshire County Cricket Club in 1867.

Born in Hunslet, Leeds, Yorkshire, England, Britton was a right-handed batsman, who recorded a duck in his first innings against Cambridgeshire at Queens Road, Wisbech, and scored three in the second innings. In a thrilling finish, Yorkshire won the match by one wicket.

He was a sound reliable batsman around Leeds, and once carried his bat for 30 out of 70, whilst playing for XXII of Hull against the All England XI, in 1870.

For over 30 years, Britton was a member of the Leeds Grand Orchestra, and was second violin at the time of his death in Leeds in January 1910, at the age of 66.
