= Horace R. Cayton Sr. =

American journalist and political activist (1859–1940)

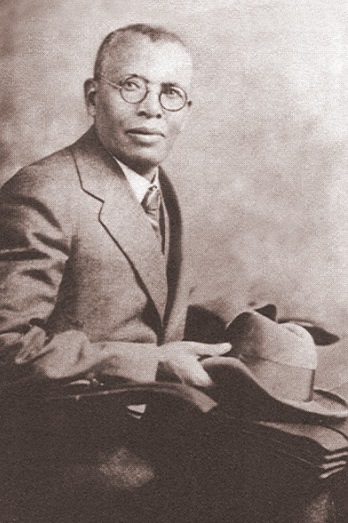
- Born: Horace Roscoe Cayton; February 3, 1859; Mississippi
- Died: August 16, 1940 (aged 81)
- Occupations: Journalist and political activist
- Political party: Republican
- Spouse: Susie Revels Cayton (1896–death)
- Children: 4, including Revels Cayton and Horace R. Cayton Jr.

Horace Roscoe Cayton Sr. (February 3, 1859 – August 16, 1940) was an American journalist and political activist. The son of a slave and a white plantation owner's daughter, Cayton went to Seattle, Washington, in the early 1890s. In 1894, Horace launched his own newspaper, The Seattle Republican. The paper was the longest-lived of seven African-American newspapers appearing in Seattle between 1891 and 1901, terminating only in 1913.

A second publishing venture was launched by Cayton in 1916, with the launch of the eponymous Cayton's Weekly. Unlike its predecessor, this four-page tabloid was focused upon national and local news of interest to a black readership. Falling into financial difficulties in 1921, Cayton's Weekly briefly altered its production cycle to become Cayton's Monthly before folding completely.

== Biography ==
=== Early years ===
Horace Cayton was born in 1859 on a plantation in Mississippi. After Emancipation, he and his family moved to a farm near Port Gibson, Mississippi. He graduated from Alcorn College and was attending that institution in 1872.

=== Newspaper publisher ===
Cayton's second publication was the four page Cayton's Weekly, produced from 1916 until 1921.

Horace headed west, and ended up in Seattle, where he worked as a political reporter for the Seattle Post-Intelligencer. Later in life, he found employment at the Seattle Standard, the city’s first newspaper for African Americans, working at that paper until it ceased in 1893.

The following year, Cayton launched a newspaper of his own, The Seattle Republican, with its first issue seeing print in May 1894. The paper sought to appeal to both white and black readers, achieving some limited success in this regard, although the readership of the paper was modest, never exceeding about 2,000.

By 1896, Cayton married Susie Revels, a young woman he had met in college. Susie Revels was the daughter of Senator Hiram Rhodes Revels, a Reconstruction-era Republican from the state of Mississippi remembered as the first African-American elected to the United States Senate. After the couple's marriage, Susie Revels Cayton would become associate editor of the Seattle Republican.

Cayton's Republican criticized the corruption of the Yukon Gold Rush-era administration of mayor Thomas J. Humes and, in particular, his police chief William L. Meredith, who proceeded to have Cayton arrested for criminal libel. He was acquitted. The resulting controversy was a factor in escalating a scandal that led Meredith to resign and to attempt to gun down another of his accusers, John Considine. Considine ultimately shot Meredith in self-defense.

The Republican Party attracted many black people and Cayton was able to win an important position in the party. He was a recurrent delegate to the county and state nominating conventions, secretary of the party’s King County convention in 1902, and for many years a member of the Republican State Central Committee. In Seattle, between 1900 and 1910, the number of blacks had risen by almost 2,000 people causing white prejudice to grow. Politically, Cayton lost power and after 1910 he never sat on the Republican State Central Committee or attended a Republican convention again.

Cayton became a victim of Seattle’s changing racial and political pattern. On May 2, 1913, the Seattle Republican ceased operations after Cayton lost a court case where he sued a restaurant for telling him not to return after they had served him. He continued his career in publishing and issued Cayton’s Weekly from 1916 followed by Cayton's Monthly until 1921, when he retired.

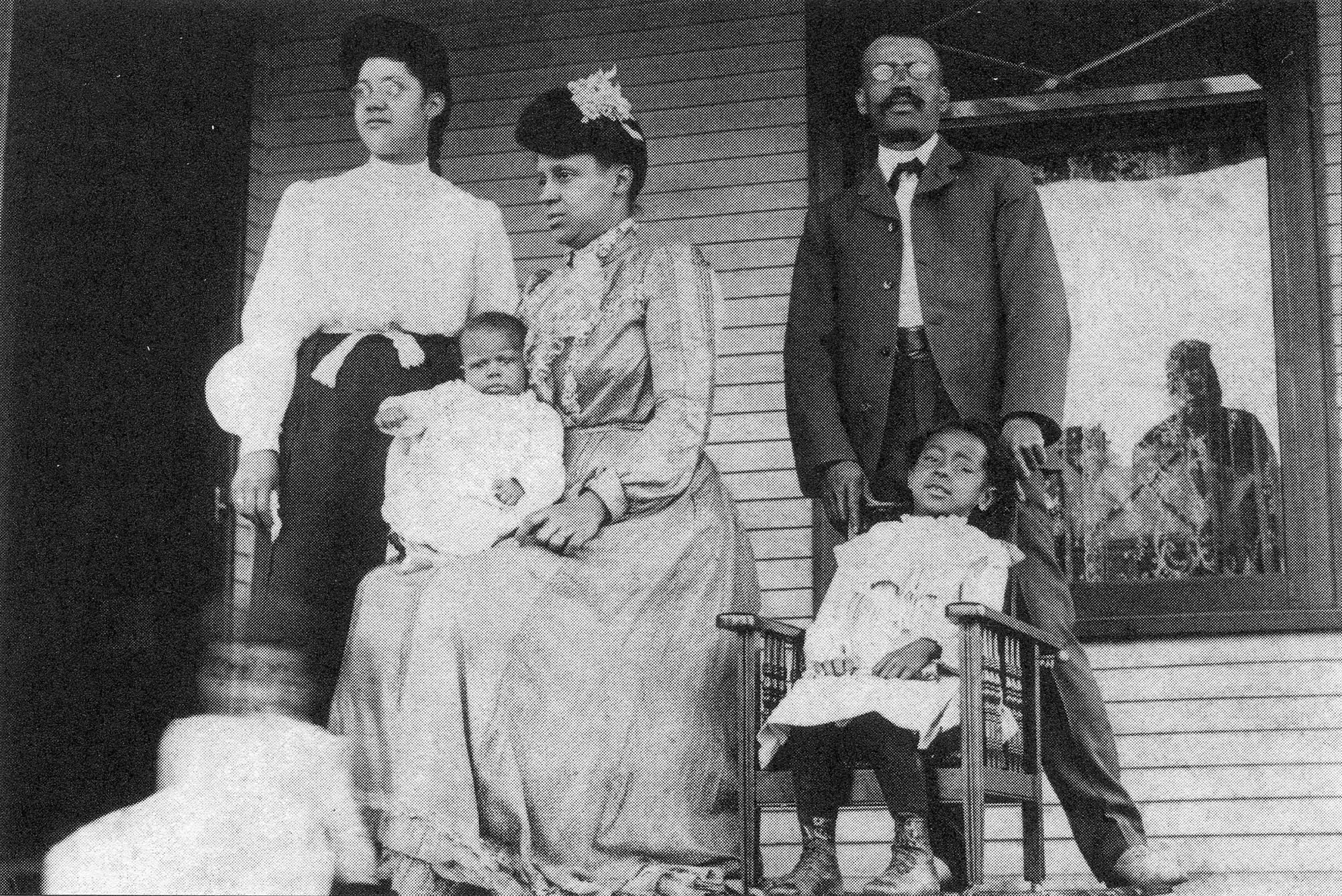
Members of the Cayton family pose for a portrait on the front porch of their Seattle home, c. 1904. From left: Ruth (blurred), Emma (Susie's niece), Susie holding baby Horace Jr., and Horace standing above Madge (seated)

=== Later years ===
Cayton sold his home on Capitol Hill and moved to an apartment house, which he owned and produced income. They lost two houses and the apartment building during the Great Depression, but continued to live in the house paying $10 per month rent. Cayton and his wife entered into activities of the ever-growing black community. They participated in many social and civic events. He continued his affiliation with the Republican Party through membership in the King County Colored Republican Club.

=== Death and legacy ===
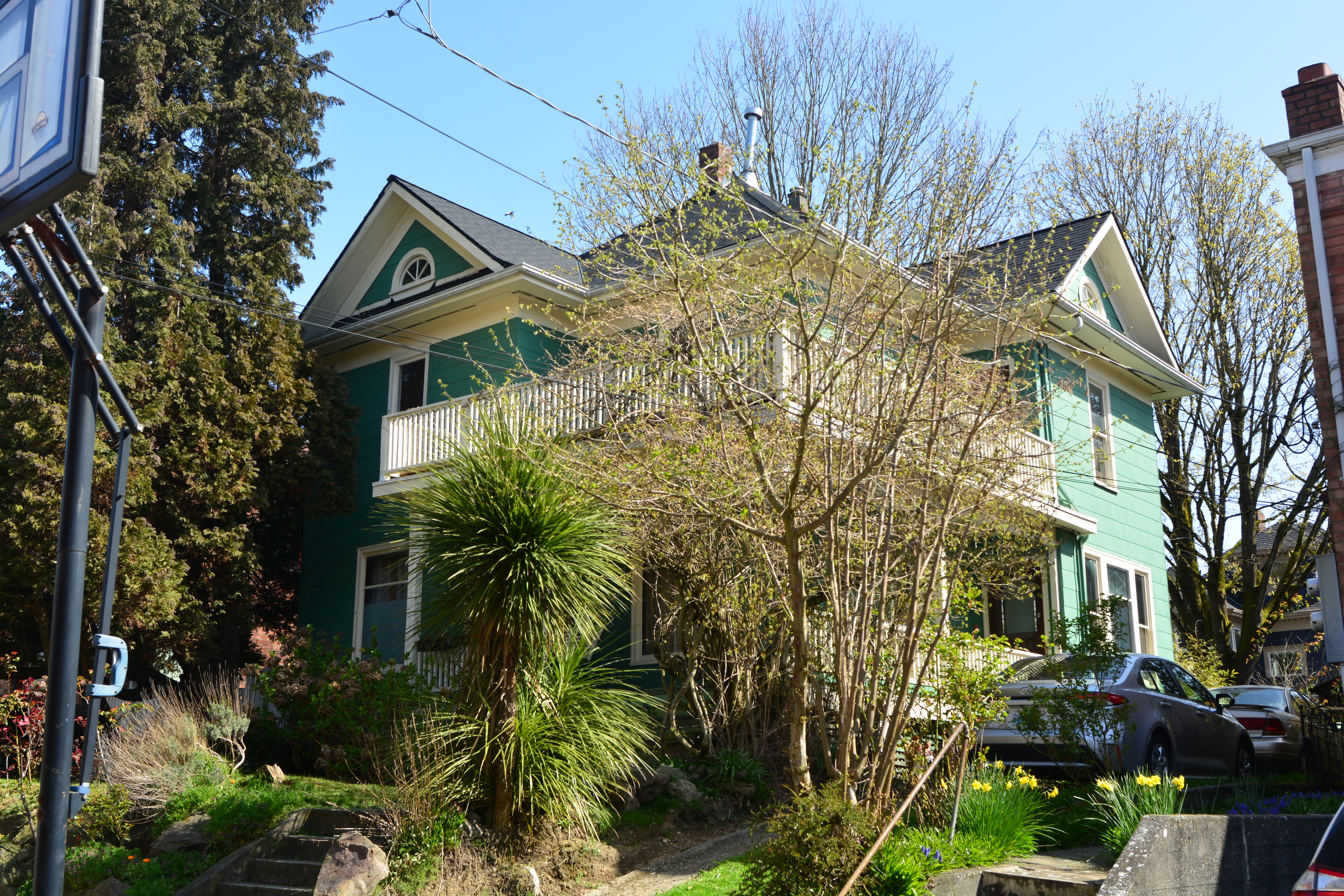
The Cayton's Seattle home was designated a city landmark in 2021.

Cayton died on August 16, 1940. Susie died in 1943.

Cayton's son Horace R. Cayton Jr. (1903–1970) became an educator, researcher, government official, newspaper columnist, and famous sociologist, notable for his anthropological work Black Metropolis, which he co-authored with St. Clair Drake. Lisa S. Weitzman says on Answers.com: "With the purpose of educating white America, the book further exposed and explained African American conduct, personality, and culture which emerged from the conditions imposed by the white world. Ultimately, Cayton and Drake concluded their book with a call for the government to work more aggressively to help African Americans achieve equality. Like his father, Cayton expressed an ongoing concern for racial equality and civil rights, a theme to which he repeatedly returned in his regular column for the Pittsburgh Courier."

Another son, Revels Cayton, became a labor leader and deputy mayor of San Francisco. Daughter Madge Cayton, like her brother Horace, earned a degree from the University of Washington, in her case a business degree. Another daughter, Lillie Cayton, was a social activist in Seattle and later in San Diego, California.

== Works ==
- Cayton's Legislative Manual: The Ninth Legislature of Washington. Seattle, WA: H.R. Cayton, 1905.
- Cayton's Campaign Compendium of Washington, 1908. Seattle, WA: H.R. Cayton, 1908.
- Cayton's Year Book: Seattle's Colored Citizens. Seattle, WA: H.R. Cayton and Son, 1923.
- Autobiographical Writings of Horace R. Cayton, Sr., Published in Cayton's Weekly, 1917–1920. Richard S. Hobbs, ed. Awali, Bahrain: R.S. Hobbs, 1987.
