= Susie Revels Cayton =

American writer, editor and activist (1870–1943)

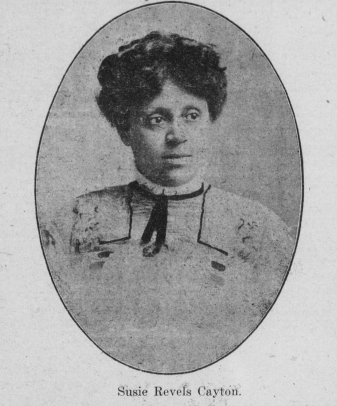
- Born: Susan Sumner Revels; January 1, 1870; Mississippi, U.S.
- Died: July 28, 1943 (aged 73)
- Education: Rust College
- Occupations: Writer, activist
- Political party: Communist Party USA
- Spouse: Horace Cayton Sr.
- Children: 5, including Horace Cayton Jr., Revels Cayton
- Father: Hiram Revels
- Relatives: Ida Revels Redmond (sister), Sidney Revels Redmond (nephew)

Susie Revels Cayton (January 1, 1870 – July 28, 1943) was an American writer, editor, activist, and leader in the Black community in Seattle at the start of the 20th century.

== Biography ==
=== Early life ===
Susie Sumner Revels was born in Mississippi on January 1, 1870, the same year her father, Hiram Revels, became the first Black senator in US history. Revels' middle name "Sumner" was a tribute to Charles Sumner, Hiram Revels' friend, the senior Massachusetts senator the year Susie was born.

Beginning at age 16, Revels taught school. In 1889, she began studying at Rust College, graduating with honors in 1893 with a degree in "nurse training," then teaching at the college for three years after graduation. The Revels family connection to Rust College was strong: her father taught theology classes there, and her sisters Ida and Maggie were also alumnae.

=== Journalism ===
Revels met her future husband, Horace Cayton, in Mississippi around 1881, when she was eleven years old and Horace was courting her older sister Lillie. After moving to Seattle, Cayton corresponded at length with Revels' father; Susie's increasingly long postscripts and Cayton's responses eventually amounted to a correspondence between Cayton and Susie herself. After a period of long distance letter writing, she followed him to Seattle in 1896, living in separate lodgings until they could be married in July of the same year. She had started writing for his Seattle-based newspaper, The Seattle Republican, before leaving Mississippi, and eventually became associate editor in 1900. She continued working at the paper until it folded in 1913. Given that her husband sometimes traveled out of state, there were times when that associate editor role essentially meant putting out a newspaper.

Revels and her husband were both light-skinned which, in the words of Richard S. Hobbs, "clearly played a role in the Caytons' early acceptance in Seattle." However, as Seattle grew, it became a less hospitable place for Black Americans. The Seattle Republican had never exactly been a "Black paper," it had been a Black-edited Republican paper. As race relations deteriorated, fewer White people wanted to read a Black-edited paper, and the paper never quite crossed over into being the newspaper specifically of the Black community. This (and some unsuccessful real estate speculation) led to a general decline in the Cayton's fortunes after 1907 or so, with them selling their Capitol Hill house in 1909 (pushed out in part by increasing pressure for residential segregation) and shuttering The Seattle Republican in 1913. Revels and her husband started another newspaper Cayton's Weekly, in 1916, which targeted the Black community in Seattle. The paper ran until 1920 when it was replaced by Cayton's Monthly, which only ran for two issues.

In addition to her journalistic writing, Revels wrote short stories which appeared in The Seattle Republican, Cayton's Weekly, and the Seattle Post-Intelligencer.

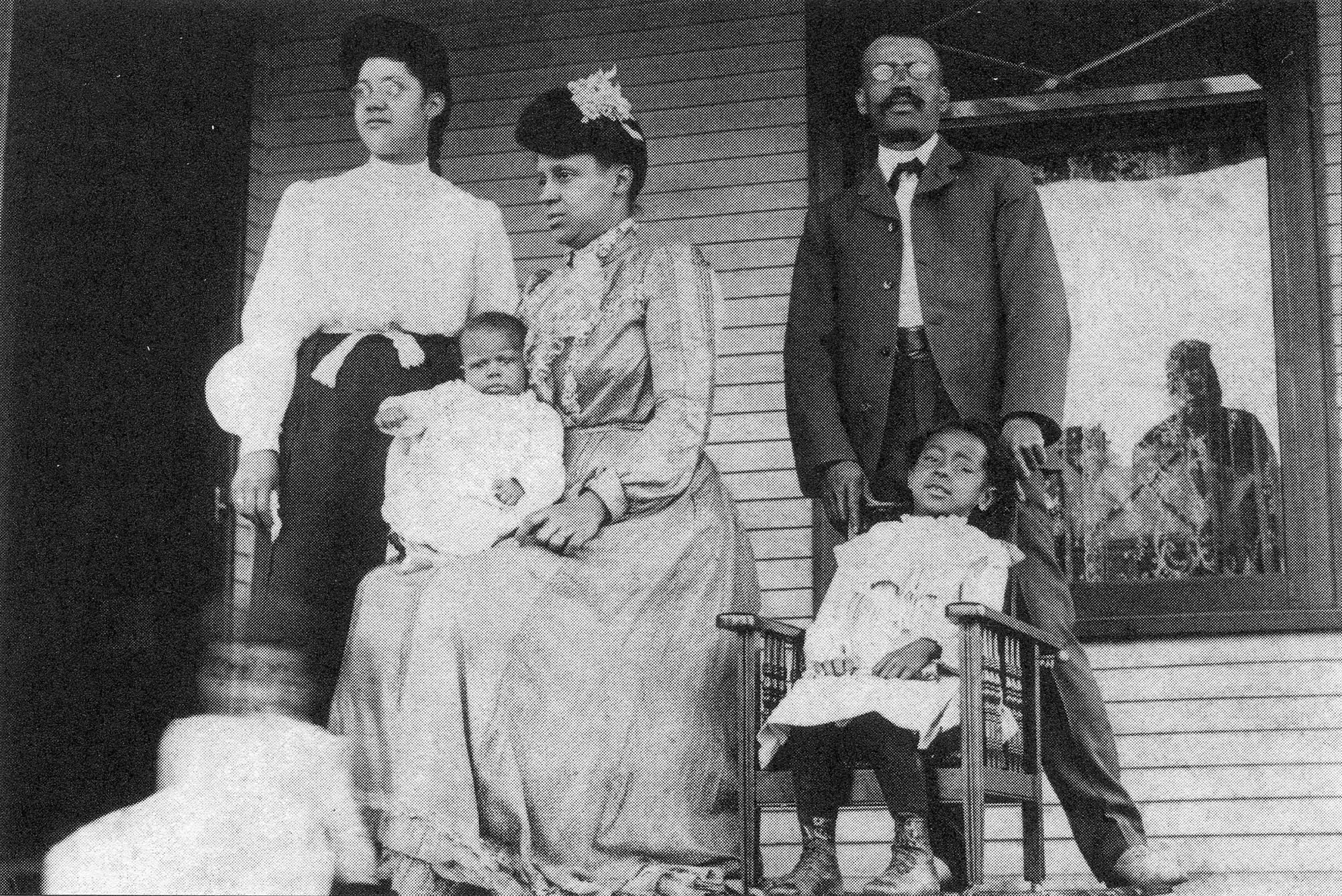
Members of the Cayton family pose for a portrait on the front porch of their Seattle home, c. 1904. From left: Ruth (blurred), Emma (Susie's niece), Susie holding baby Horace Jr., and Horace standing above Madge (seated).

=== Later life ===
In 1919, at the age of 49, Susie Revels Cayton was forced to seek employment as a "domestic" as the family experienced economic hardships.

In her sixties, she became politically active and joined the Communist Party, after being introduced to the organization by her son, Revels Cayton, and was considered "one of the state's most prominent African American radicals". She joined the Communist Party in reaction to Depression-era Seattle, believing that only radical political change could address economic inequality.

She became friends with activists Paul Robeson and Langston Hughes, and was admired by Richard Wright. Langston Hughes dedicated a poem, "Dear Mr. President," to her.

Revels Cayton moved to Chicago in 1942, two years after her husband died, to be closer to her children. She continued advocating for progressive politics and communism to promote equality until she died in July 1943.

== Charitable work ==
In 1910 Cayton founded the The Dorcas Club, a group of Black women dedicated to improving the social conditions of Seattle. This included finding homes for orphans and helping widows with living expenses. She was also Secretary of the Skid Row Unemployed Council and Vice President of the Negro Workers Council.

== Children ==
Susie Revels Cayton had five children with Horace Cayton Sr: activists Horace Cayton Jr. and Revels Cayton, Ruth, Madge, and Lillie. Madge, was one of the first African American women to graduate from the University of Washington and a social worker. They also adopted their granddaughter, Susan, after Ruth died in 1919, and raised her as their youngest child.

== Legacy ==
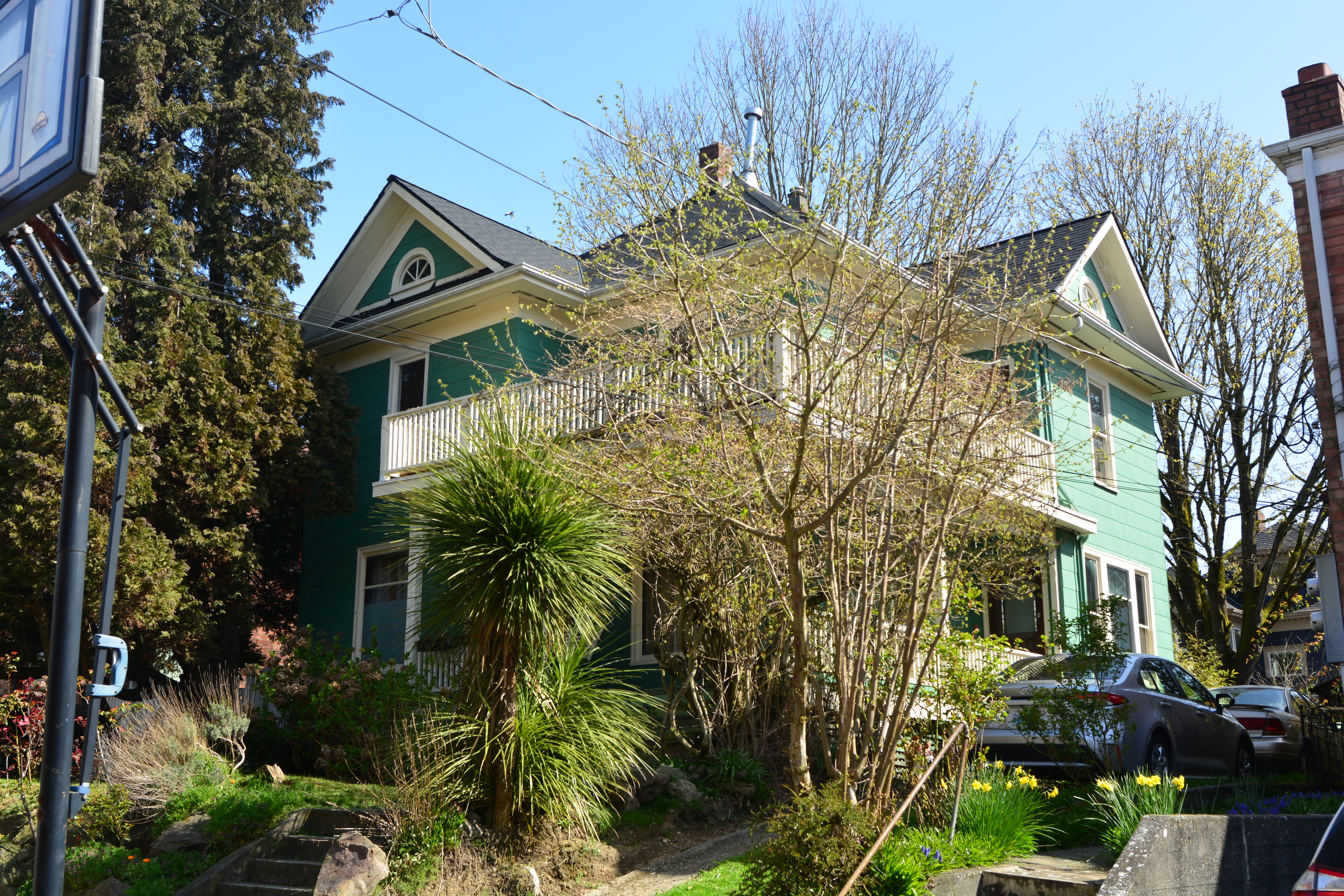
The Caytons' Seattle home was designated a city landmark in 2021.

In 1992 the Cayton Scholarship was established to honor both Susie and Horace Cayton. This scholarship is available to minority students in Washington state pursuing a public relations career.

In 1902 Revels Cayton and her husband had a house built in Seattle's prosperous Capitol Hill neighborhood. They lived there from 1903 to 1909. In 2021 Seattle's Landmarks Preservation Board designated the house as a historic landmark.

== Published works ==
- The Part She Played, short story
- Licker, short story
- The Storm, short story
