= Horace R. Cayton Jr. =

African American sociologist

- Born: April 12, 1903; Seattle, Washington, U.S.
- Died: January 21, 1970 (aged 66); Paris, France
- Education: University of Washington
- Occupations: Sociologist, newspaper columnist, and author
- Notable work: Black Metropolis: A Study of Negro Life in a Northern City (1945)

Horace Roscoe Cayton Jr. (April 12, 1903 – January 21, 1970) was a prominent American sociologist, newspaper columnist, and writer who specialized in studies of working-class black Americans, particularly in mid-20th-century Chicago. Cayton is best remembered as the co-author of a seminal 1945 study of South Side, Chicago, Black Metropolis: A Study of Negro Life in a Northern City.

== Biography ==
=== Early years ===
Horace R. Cayton Jr. was born April 12, 1903, in Seattle, Washington, to newspaper publisher Horace R. Cayton, Sr. and Susie Revels. His mother was the daughter of Hiram Rhodes Revels, the first black American elected to the United States Senate. The Caytons maintained an upper-middle-class standard of living, including a home in a wealthy, predominantly white neighborhood and employing a full-time Japanese servant. His father was active in Republican politics and had acquaintances throughout the black American intelligentsia, with Booker T. Washington as one memorable house guest.

Cayton grew up in Seattle, where he graduated from Franklin High School and later the University of Washington. In 1929 he moved to Chicago to attend graduate school in sociology at the University of Chicago.

=== Career ===
In 1934, Cayton went to work as a researcher for the United States Department of the Interior, co-authoring Report on the Negro's Share in Industrial Rehabilitation with George Sinclair Mitchell in 1935.

Following his stint with the Interior Department, Cayton moved to Nashville, Tennessee, where he taught economics at Fisk University for a time. Cayton subsequently returned to government employment heading a Chicago-based research project for the Works Progress Administration (WPA) for three years, ultimately producing a book from research in this period, Black Workers and the New Unions (1939).

In 1940, Cayton became the director of the Parkway Community House in Chicago. He would remain working in that capacity until 1949.

Cayton was the coauthor, with St. Clair Drake, of the 1945 Black Metropolis: A Study of Negro Life in a Northern City, a history of Chicago's South Side and its black residents from the 1840s, when the area was a major transport hub for the Underground Railroad, to the 1930s. The book was considered pioneering in its exploration of the role race relations played in creating the economic situation of lower and middle-class blacks in urban America.

During the 1950s, Cayton worked as a researcher for the American Jewish Committee and the National Council of Churches and worked for two years as a news correspondent at the United Nations for the Pittsburgh Courier. He also wrote a weekly column for the Courier for 27 years.

=== Personal life and legacy ===
While living in New York during the 1950s, Cayton had an affair with Lore Segal, an author and Holocaust survivor. Segal wrote about their relationship in her novel, My First American.

In 1961 Cayton moved to the Monterey Bay area of California, making his residence in the towns of Capitola and Aptos. He later settled in Santa Cruz. He continued to participate periodically in academic and political pursuits, including a seminar on "The Black Experience" at Cowell College, and serving as a speaker at the opening of the Martin Luther King Jr. Memorial Center in Atlanta.

Cayton died of influenza in Paris, France, on January 21, 1970, while on a National Endowment for the Humanities-sponsored research trip to gather material for a biography of his friend, author Richard Wright. He was 66 years old at the time of his death.

== Works ==
- Report on the Negro's Share in Industrial Rehabilitation: Sections on the Birmingham District, Car and Railroad Repair Shops, Conclusions and Recommendations by George Sinclair Mitchell, with Whom was Associated Horace Cayton; Submitted to Clark Foreman, Counsel on the Economic Status of Negroes, Office of the Secretary of the Interior, May, 1935. With George Sinclair Mitchell. n.c.: n.p, [1935].
- Black Workers and the New Unions. With George Sinclair Mitchell. Chapel Hill, NC: University of North Carolina Press, 1939.
- Negro Housing in Chicago. New York: Council for Social Action of the Congregational and Christian Churches, 1940.
- Black Metropolis: A Study of Negro Life in a Northern City. With St. Clair Drake, introduction by Richard Wright. New York: Harcourt, Brace and Co., 1945. —Revised edition in 1962.
- The Psychological Approach to Race Relations. Portland, OR: Reed College, 1946.
- "Bronzeville," with St. Clair Drake, Holiday, May 1947. —Reprinted as a pamphlet.
- The Chinese in the United States and the Chinese Christian Churches: A Statement Condensed for the National Conference on the Chinese Christian Churches from a Study by Horace R. Cayton and Anne O. Lively Incorporating Field Work and Consultation by Peter Y.F. Shih. With Anne O. Lively and Marjorie M. Carter. New York: Bureau of Research and Survey, National Council of the Churches of Christ in the United States of America, 1955.
- Long Old Road: An Autobiography. New York: Trident Press, 1965.
- Personal Experiences in Race Relations. n.c.: Horace R. Cayton, 1967.
- Horace Roscoe Cayton: Selected Writings. In two volumes. Ed Diaz, ed. Seattle, WA: Bridgewater-Collins, 2002.

== Additional resources ==
=== Books ===
- Stanley D. Stevens (ed.), Carry On!: The Carli & Stanley Stevens' Collection of Correspondence and Memorabilia from and about Horace Roscoe Cayton Jr. Santa Cruz, CA: S.D. Stevens, 2003.
- Robert Washington, "Horace Cayton: Reflections on an Unfulfilled Sociological Career", The American Sociologist, vol. 28, no. 1 (Spring 1997), pp. 55–74. In JSTOR

=== Archival materials ===
- Horace R. Clayton Papers at the Chicago Public Library
