= Hiram R. Revels =

American politician (1827–1901)

The Reverend Hiram R. Revels
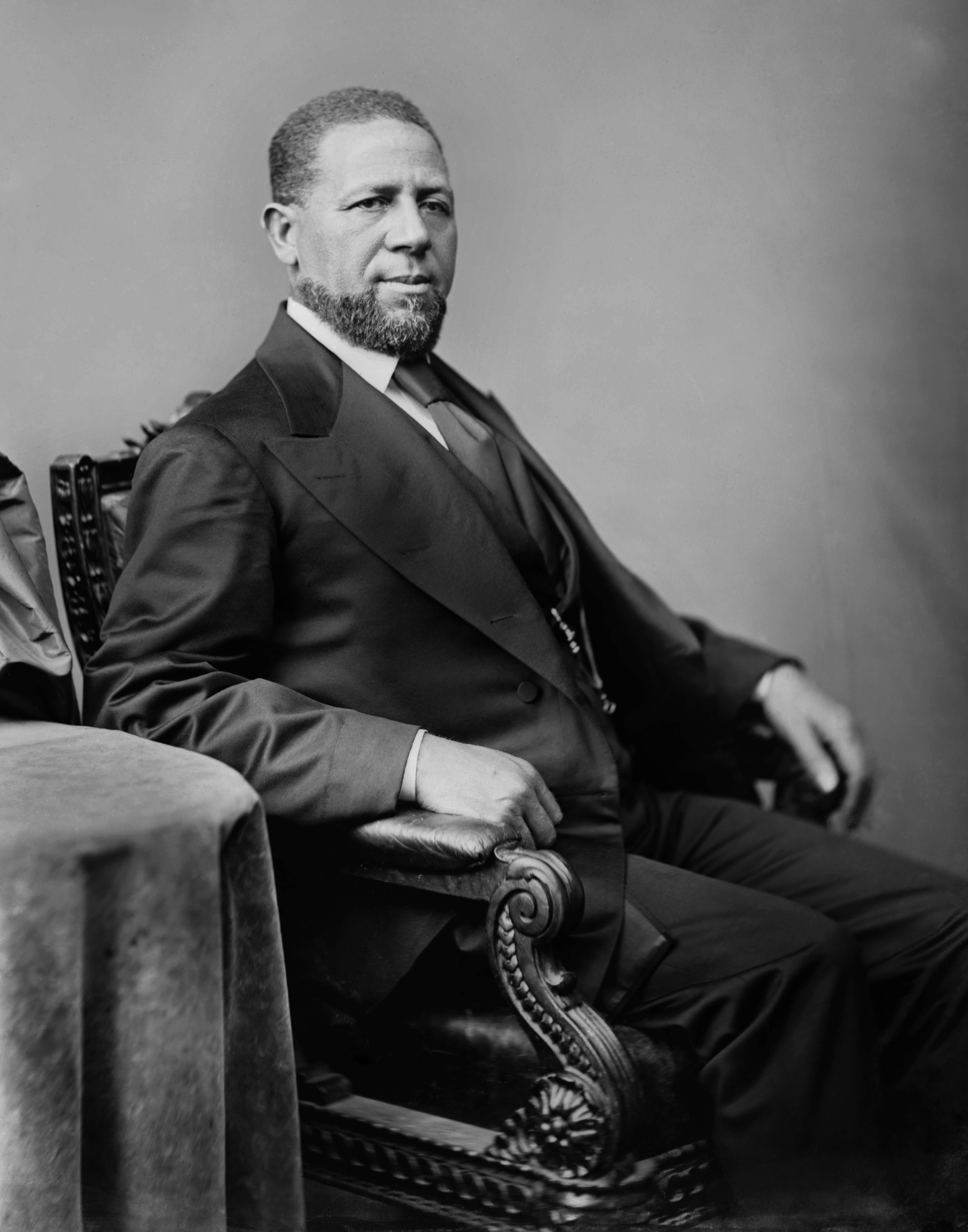
- Revels, c. 1860–1875

Secretary of State of Mississippi
- In office December 30, 1872 – September 1, 1873
- Governor: Ridgely C. Powers
- Preceded by: James D. Lynch
- Succeeded by: Hannibal C. Carter

United States Senator from Mississippi
- In office February 25, 1870 – March 3, 1871
- Preceded by: Albert G. Brown
- Succeeded by: James L. Alcorn

Member of the Mississippi State Senate from the 4th district
- In office January 11, 1870 – February 25, 1870
- Succeeded by: Jeremiah M. P. Williams

Personal details
- Born: Hiram Rhodes Revels; September 27, 1827 Fayetteville, North Carolina, U.S.
- Died: January 16, 1901 (aged 73) Aberdeen, Mississippi, U.S.
- Party: Republican
- Spouse: Phoebe Bass
- Children: 8, including Susie and Ida
- Education: Beech Grove Quaker Seminary (attended); Darke County Seminary (attended); Knox College (attended)

Military service
- Allegiance: United States (Union)
- Branch/service: Union Army
- Years of service: 1863–1865
- Unit: Chaplain Corps
- Battles/wars: American Civil War

Hiram Rhodes Revels (September 27, 1827 (Note: Different sources list his birth year as either 1827 or 1822.) – January 16, 1901) was an American politician, minister in the African Methodist Episcopal Church, and college administrator. Born free in North Carolina, he later lived and worked in Ohio, where he voted before the Civil War. Elected by the Mississippi legislature to the United States Senate as a Republican to represent Mississippi in 1870 and 1871 during the Reconstruction era, he was the first African American to serve in either house of the U.S. Congress.

During the American Civil War, Revels had helped organize two regiments of the United States Colored Troops and served as a chaplain. After serving in the Senate, Revels was appointed as the first president of Alcorn Agricultural and Mechanical College (now Alcorn State University), a historically black college. He served from 1871 to 1873. Later in his life, he served again as a minister.

== Early life and education ==
Revels was born free in 1827 in Fayetteville, North Carolina, to free people of color, with ancestors who had been free since before the American Revolution. One of Revels's grandfathers reportedly fought in the Revolution, which "could bring about an elevated status in communities even in the federal and antebellum eras," according to one historian. His parents were of African American, European, and rumored "Croatan" ancestry. His mother was also specifically known to be of Scots descent. His father was a Baptist preacher.

Revels was a second cousin to Lewis Sheridan Leary, one of the men who was killed taking part in John Brown's raid on Harpers Ferry in 1859, and to North Carolina lawyer and politician John S. Leary. Another of Revels's cousins, Matthew Leary Jr., co-founded Fayetteville State University.

During his childhood, Revels's education came from a local free Black woman, despite restrictions at the time on education for free Black children. In 1838, at age 11, he went to live with his older brother, Elias B. Revels, in Lincolnton, North Carolina. He was apprenticed as a barber in his brother's shop. Barbering was considered a respectable, steady trade for black Americans in this period. As men of all races used barbers, the trade provided black Americans an opportunity to establish networks with the white community. After Elias Revels died in 1841, his widow Mary transferred the shop to Hiram Revels before she remarried.

Revels attended the Beech Grove Quaker Seminary, a school in Union County, Indiana, founded by Quakers, and the Union Literary Institute, also known as the Darke County Seminary despite being in Randolph County, Indiana.

In 1845, Revels was ordained as a minister in the African Methodist Episcopal Church (AME); he served as a preacher and religious teacher throughout the Midwest: in Indiana, Illinois, Ohio, Tennessee, Missouri, and Kansas. "At times, I met with a great deal of opposition," he later recalled. "I was imprisoned in Missouri in 1854 for preaching the gospel to Negroes, though I was never subjected to violence." During these years, he voted in Ohio.

In the 1850s, he married Phoebe Bass, a free Black woman. He studied religion from 1855 to 1857 at Knox College in Galesburg, Illinois. He became a minister in a Methodist Episcopal Church in Baltimore, Maryland, where he also served as a principal of a black high school.

During the American Civil War, Revels served as a chaplain in the United States Army. After the Union authorized establishment of the United States Colored Troops, he helped recruit and organize two black Union regiments in Maryland and Missouri. He took part at the Battle of Vicksburg in Vicksburg, Mississippi.

== Political career ==
In 1865, Revels left the AME Church, the first independent black denomination in the US, and joined the Methodist Episcopal Church. He was assigned briefly to churches in Leavenworth, Kansas, and New Orleans, Louisiana. In 1866, he was called as a permanent pastor at a church in Natchez, Mississippi, where he settled with his wife and six daughters. He became an elder in the Mississippi District of the Methodist Church, continued his ministerial work, and founded schools for black children.

During Reconstruction, Revels was elected alderman in Natchez in 1868. In 1869 he was elected to represent Adams County in the Mississippi State Senate.

Congressman John R. Lynch later wrote of him in his book on Reconstruction:

Revels was comparatively a new man in the community. He had recently been stationed at Natchez as pastor in charge of the A.M.E. Church, and so far as known he had never voted, had never attended a political meeting, and of course, had never made a political speech. But he was a colored man, and presumed to be a Republican, and believed to be a man of ability and considerably above the average in point of intelligence; just the man, it was thought, the Rev. Noah Buchanan would be willing to vote for.

In January 1870, Revels presented the opening prayer in the state legislature. Lynch wrote of that occasion,

That prayer—one of the most impressive and eloquent prayers that had ever been delivered in the [Mississippi] Senate Chamber—made Revels a United States Senator. He made a profound impression upon all who heard him. It impressed those who heard it that Revels was not only a man of great natural ability but that he was also a man of superior attainments.

=== Election to Senate ===
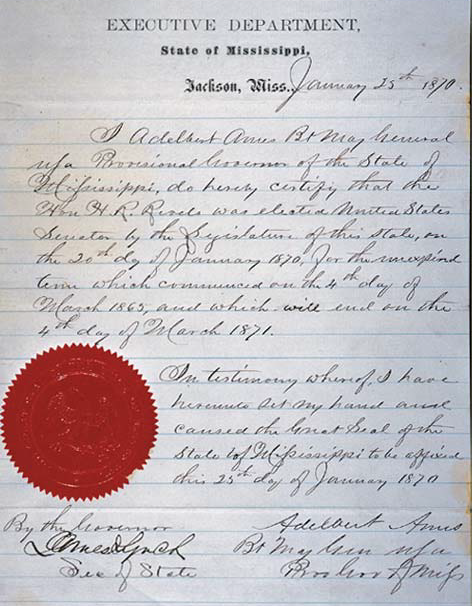
Letter dated January 25, 1870, from the Governor of the State of Mississippi and the Secretary of State of Mississippi that certified the election of Hiram Revels to the United States Senate.

At the time, as in every state, the Mississippi legislature elected U.S. senators; they were not elected by popular vote until after ratification of the 17th Amendment in 1913.

In 1870, Revels was elected by a vote of 81 to 15 in the Mississippi legislature to finish the term of one of the state's two seats in the U.S. Senate, which had been left vacant since the Civil War. Previously, it had been held by Albert G. Brown, who withdrew from the U.S. Senate in 1861 when Mississippi seceded. Historian Eric Foner characterized Revels's election "as something of a surprise, as Revels was little known in Republican Party circles outside Natchez." One Democratic newspaper in Mississippi welcomed Revels's election as a "good omen" since he "belonged to the moderate wing of the Republican Party," according to Foner.

When Revels arrived in Washington, D.C., Southern Democrats in office opposed seating him in the Senate. For the two days of debate, the Senate galleries were packed with spectators at this historic event. The Democrats based their opposition on the 1857 Dred Scott Decision by the U.S. Supreme Court, which ruled that people of African ancestry were not and could not be citizens. They argued that no black man was a citizen before the 14th Amendment was ratified in 1868, and thus Revels could not satisfy the requirement of the Senate for nine years' prior citizenship.

Supporters of Revels made arguments ranging from relatively narrow and technical issues, to fundamental arguments about the meaning of the Civil War. Among the narrower arguments was that Revels was of primarily European ancestry (an "octoroon") and that the Dred Scott decision should be interpreted as applying only to those blacks who were of totally African ancestry. Supporters said that Revels had long been a citizen (as shown by his voting in Ohio) and that he had met the nine-year requirement before the Dred Scott decision changed the rules and held that blacks could not be citizens.

The more fundamental argument by Revels's supporters was that the Civil War, and the Reconstruction amendments, had overturned Dred Scott. Because of the war and the Amendments, they argued, the subordination of the black race was no longer part of the American constitutional regime and, therefore, it would be unconstitutional to bar Revels on the basis of the pre-Civil War Constitution's citizenship rules. One Republican Senator supporting Revels mocked opponents as still fighting the "last battle-field" of that war.

Senator Charles Sumner (R-Massachusetts) said, "The time has passed for argument. Nothing more need be said. For a long time it has been clear that colored persons must be senators." Sumner, a Republican, later said,

All men are created equal, says the great Declaration, and now a great act attests this verity. Today we make the Declaration a reality. ... The Declaration was only half established by Independence. The greatest duty remained behind. In assuring the equal rights of all we complete the work.

On February 25, 1870, Revels, on a party-line vote of 48 to 8, with Republicans voting in favor and Democrats voting against, became the first African American to be seated in the United States Senate. Everyone in the galleries stood to see him sworn in.

Sumner's Massachusetts colleague, Henry Wilson, defended Revels's election, and presented as evidence of its validity signatures from the clerks of the Mississippi House of Representatives and Mississippi State Senate, as well as that of Adelbert Ames, the military Governor of Mississippi. Wilson argued that Revels's skin color was not a bar to Senate service, and connected the role of the Senate to Christianity's Golden Rule of doing to others as one would have done to oneself.

=== U.S. senator ===
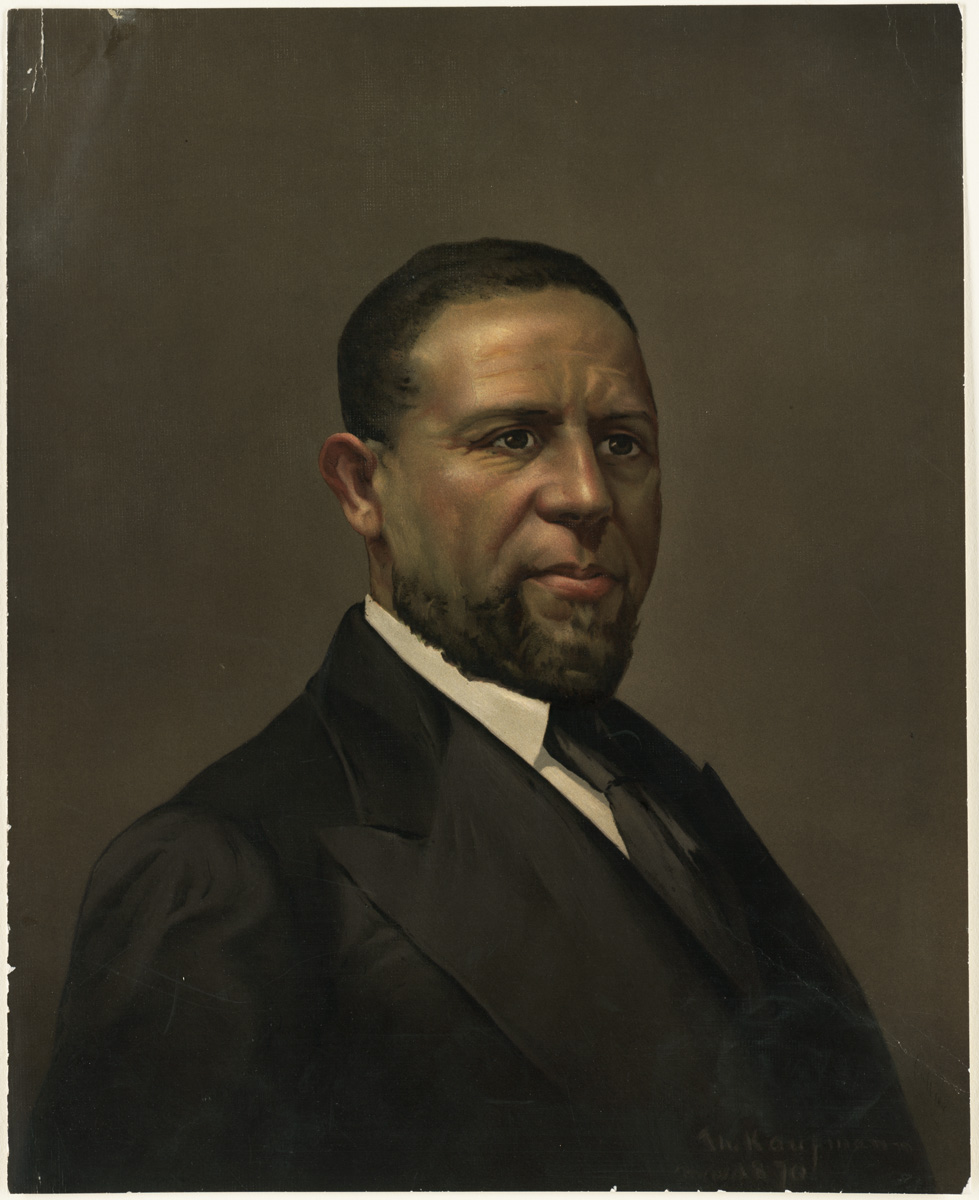
Revels was the first Black American to serve in the United States Senate.

Revels advocated compromise and moderation. He vigorously supported racial equality and worked to reassure his fellow senators about the capability of African Americans. In his maiden speech to the Senate on March 16, 1870, he argued for the reinstatement of the black legislators of the Georgia General Assembly, who had been illegally ousted by white Democratic Party representatives. He said, "I maintain that the past record of my race is a true index of the feelings which today animate them. They aim not to elevate themselves by sacrificing one single interest of their white fellow citizens."

He served on both the Committee of Education and Labor and the Committee on the District of Columbia. (At the time, Congress administered the District.) When Congress debated legislation establishing public schooling in the District, Revels criticized a proposed amendment that would permit racial segregation in school admissions. Despite Revels's opposition, the amendment passed, and DC public schools remained segregated until the 1950s. Much of the Senate's attention focused on Reconstruction issues. While Radical Republicans called for continued punishment of ex-Confederates, Revels argued for amnesty and a restoration of full citizenship, provided they swore an oath of loyalty to the United States. According to Foner, Revels's one successful piece of legislation was a bill that restored the rights of a former Confederate officer, allowing him to be appointed to a Mississippi judgeship.

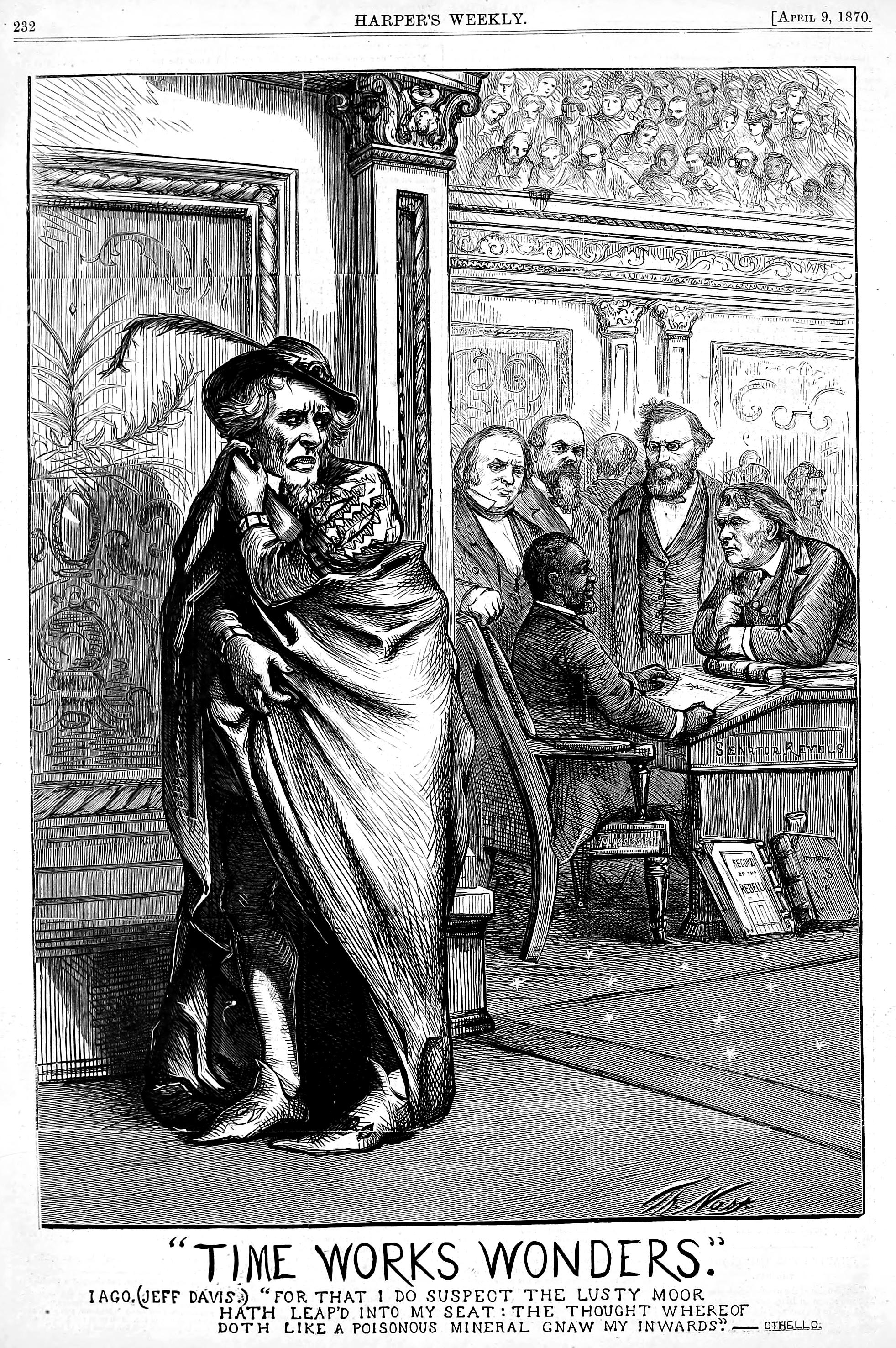
Political cartoon: Revels (seated) replaces Jefferson Davis (left; dressed as Iago from William Shakespeare's Othello) in US Senate. Harper's Weekly February 19, 1870. Davis had been a senator from Mississippi until 1861.

Revels's Senate term lasted a little over one year, from February 25, 1870, to March 3, 1871. He quietly and persistently, although for the most part unsuccessfully, worked for equality. He spoke against an amendment proposed by Senator Allen G. Thurman (D-Ohio) to keep the schools of Washington, D.C., segregated and argued for their integration. He nominated a young black man to the United States Military Academy; the youth was subsequently denied admission. Revels successfully championed the cause of black workers who had been barred by their color from working at the Washington Navy Yard.

The Northern press praised Revels for his oratorical abilities. His conduct in the Senate, along with that of the other black Americans who had been seated in the House of Representatives, prompted a white Congressman, James G. Blaine (R-Maine), to write in his memoir, "The colored men who took their seats in both Senate and House were as a rule studious, earnest, ambitious men, whose public conduct would be honorable to any race." Revels supported bills to invest in developing infrastructure in Mississippi: to grant lands and right of way to aid the construction of the New Orleans and Northeastern Railroad (41st Congress 2nd Session S. 712), and levees on the Mississippi River (41st Congress 3rd Session S. 1136).

== College president ==
Revels accepted in 1871, after his term as U.S. Senator expired, appointment as the first president of Alcorn Agricultural and Mechanical College (now Alcorn State University), a historically black college located in Claiborne County, Mississippi. He taught philosophy as well. In 1873, Revels took a leave of absence from Alcorn to serve as Mississippi's secretary of state ad interim. He was dismissed from Alcorn in 1874 when he campaigned against the reelection of Governor of Mississippi Adelbert Ames. He was reappointed in 1876 by the new Democratic administration and served until his retirement in 1882.

On November 6, 1875, Revels wrote a letter to fellow Republican and President Ulysses S. Grant that was widely reprinted. Revels denounced Ames and the carpetbaggers for manipulating the black vote for personal benefit, and for keeping alive wartime hatreds:

Since reconstruction, the masses of my people have been, as it were, enslaved in mind by unprincipled adventurers, who, caring nothing for country, were willing to stoop to anything no matter how infamous, to secure power to themselves, and perpetuate it. ... . My people have been told by these schemers, when men have been placed on the ticket who were notoriously corrupt and dishonest, that they must vote for them; that the salvation of the party depended upon it; that the man who scratched a ticket was not a Republican. This is only one of the many means these unprincipled demagogues have devised to perpetuate the intellectual bondage of my people. ... The bitterness and hate created by the late civil strife has, in my opinion, been obliterated in this state, except perhaps in some localities, and would have long since been entirely obliterated, were it not for some unprincipled men who would keep alive the bitterness of the past, and inculcate a hatred between the races, in order that they may aggrandize themselves by office, and its emoluments, to control my people, the effect of which is to degrade them.

According to Foner, Revels was "virtually alone among Mississippi’s Black leaders" in his support for the 1875 Democratic-led campaign to end Reconstruction in Mississippi.

Revels remained active as a Methodist Episcopal minister in Holly Springs, Mississippi and became an elder in the Upper Mississippi District. For a time, he served as editor of the Southwestern Christian Advocate, the newspaper of the Methodist Church. He taught theology at Shaw College (now Rust College), a historically black college founded in 1866 in Holly Springs. Hiram Revels died on January 16, 1901, while attending a church conference in Aberdeen, Mississippi. He was buried at the Hillcrest Cemetery in Holly Springs, Mississippi.

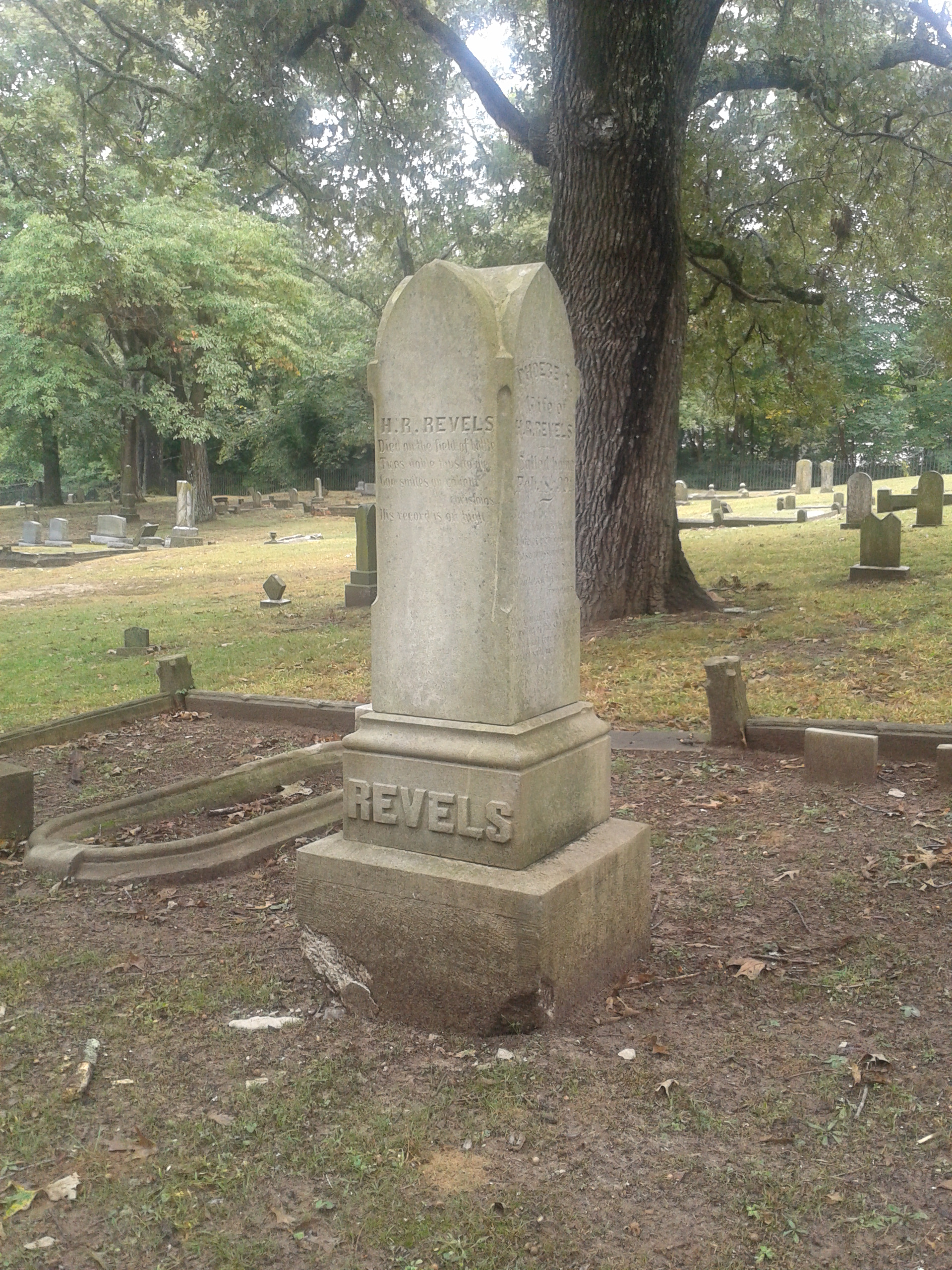
Grave of Hiram Revels in Holly Springs, Mississippi.

== Legacy ==
Revels's daughter, Susie Revels Cayton, edited The Seattle Republican in Seattle, Washington. Among his grandsons were Horace R. Cayton Jr., co-author of Black Metropolis, and Revels Cayton, a labor leader.

Historian Eric Foner has said that Revels "accomplished more as a symbol than as a legislator," noting that Frederick Douglass's newspaper, the New National Era, described Revels's Senate tenure: "We could have wished for more activity in a virgin field for Negro talent, but on the whole we are content. The precedent itself was something... by the blacks he was hailed with joy as the harbinger of a better time and a brighter period for the black man and the nation." An engraving of a portrait of Revels was a commercially-popular item during the Reconstruction period; according to Foner, a "portrait of Revels was on the wall of many, many Black families in this post-Civil War era." Activist Wendell Phillips, a contemporary of Revels's, called him "the Fifteenth Amendment in flesh and blood," referring to the constitutional amendment which gave African Americans the right to vote.

A North Carolina historical marker located at the junction of Murchison Road and Blue Street in Fayetteville commemorates Revels as the "First African American to serve in Congress" and notes his birth in Fayetteville. The marker was placed in 2006. At its unveiling, a speaker said: "We have brought home one of our most outstanding citizens. Some folks didn't even know anything about him. We've come here today to say he will never be forgotten." In 2002, scholar Molefi Kete Asante listed Hiram Rhodes Revels as one of the 100 Greatest African Americans. Revels's legacy saw renewed attention in 2026 after Scott Colom won election to the Senate, the first Black person to do so in Mississippi since Blanche Bruce, who served shortly after Revels. After Nike, Inc. announced it would provide custom-made sneakers to every high school valedictorian in the US to honor Colom's election, Colom asked that the sneaker's design honor Revels.

Revels was depicted by Kam Patterson in a dress rehearsal sketch on Saturday Night Live. The sketch made light of Revels's legacy being less than well-known, with Michael Che saying, "Look, I don't even think the guy playing you knows who you are," and Patterson responding that he "took a real long glance at my Wikipedia page before coming out here."

== See also ==
- List of African-American United States senators
- List of African-American United States Senate candidates

== Additional reading ==
- Libby, Jean; Geffert, Hannah; Kenyatta, Jimica Akinloye (March 3, 2007), Hiram Revels Related to Men in John Brown's Army, alliesforfreedom.org
- Borome, Joseph A. "The Autobiography of Hiram Rhodes Revels Together with Some Letters by and about Him," Midwest Journal, 5 (Winter 1952–1953), pp. 79–92.
- John R. Lynch The Facts of Reconstruction (1913), Online at Project Gutenberg – Memoir by Mississippi Congressman (a freedman) who served during Reconstruction
- Foner, Eric. Freedom's Lawmakers: A Directory of Black Officeholders during Reconstruction. 1996. Revised. ISBN 0-8071-2082-0.
- Gravely, William B., "Hiram Revels Protests Racial Separation in the Methodist Episcopal Church (1876)," Methodist History, 8 (1970), pp. 13–20.
- Hamilton, Brian, "The Monuments We Never Built," Edge Effects, August 22, 2017 http://edgeeffects.net/hiram-revels
- 0Harris, William C., The Day of the Carpetbagger: Republican Reconstruction in Mississippi, Louisiana State University Press, 1979
- Haskins, James, Distinguished African American Political and Governmental Leaders, Oryx Press. 1999. pp: 216–218.
- Hildebrand, Reginald F., The Times Were Strange and Stirring: Methodist Preachers and the Crisis of Emancipation, Duke University Press, 1995
- State Library of North Carolina
- Clergy Politicians in Mississippi
- Biographical sketch at the U.S. Senate website
- Portrait and biography, Harper's Weekly, February 19, 1870, p. 116
- "The Colored Member Admitted to His Seat in the Senate", New York Times, February 25, 1870
- "Hiram Revels pioneered southern Black politics". African American Registry. Media Business Solutions. Archived from the original on May 6, 2003.

U.S. Senate
Preceded by Albert G. Brown	United States Senator (Class 2) from Mississippi; 1870–1871; Served alongside: Adelbert Ames	Succeeded by James L. Alcorn
Political offices
Preceded by James D. Lynch	Secretary of State of Mississippi; 1872–1873	Succeeded by Hannibal C. Carter
