= List of Alaska companies =

The following list of Alaskan companies includes notable companies that are, or once were, headquartered in Alaska.

== Companies based in Alaska ==
=== A ===
- Ahtna, Incorporated
- Alaska Broadcast Communications
- Alaska Central Express
- Alaska Commercial Company
- Alaska Communications
- Alaska Electric Light & Power
- Alaska Flour Company
- Alaska Power and Telephone Company
- Alaska Railroad
- Aleut Corporation
- Alerion Aviation
- Alaskan Brewing Company
- Alaskan Hotel and Bar
- Alyeska Pipeline Service Company
- Arctic Slope Regional Corporation
- AT&T Alascom

=== B ===
- Bering Air
- Bering Straits Native Corporation
- Bristol Bay Native Corporation

=== C ===
- Calista Corporation
- Carlile Transportation
- Carrs-Safeway
- CCC Architects and Planners
- Chugach Alaska Corporation
- ConocoPhillips Alaska
- Cook Inlet Region, Inc.
- Credit Union 1
- Crittenden, Cassetta, Wirum & Jacobs

=== D ===
- Denali Federal Credit Union
- Doyon, Limited

=== E ===
- Everts Air
- Everts Air Cargo

=== F ===
- Fairbanks Daily News-Miner
- Far North Digital
- First National Bank Alaska
- Frontier Flying Service
- FS Air Service

=== G ===
- GCI
- Global Credit Union

=== H ===
- Huna Totem Corporation

=== K ===
- Kaladi Brothers Coffee
- Koahnic Broadcast Corporation
- Koniag, Incorporated

=== L ===
- Lynden Air Cargo

=== M ===
- Midnight Sun Brewing Company
- Mo Mountain Mutts
- Moose's Tooth Pub & Pizzeria

=== N ===
- NANA Development Corporation
- NANA Regional Corporation
- Northern Air Cargo

=== O ===
- Ounalashka Corporation

=== P ===
- Petroleum News

=== R ===
- Ryan Air Services

=== S ===
- Santa Claus House
- Sealaska Corporation
- Silver Gulch Brewing & Bottling Company
- Spirit of Alaska Federal Credit Union

=== T ===
- Tanadgusix Corporation
- Taylor & Kilpatrick

=== U ===
- Ukpeaġvik Iñupiat Corporation

=== W ===
- Warbelow's Air Ventures

== Companies formerly based in Alaska ==
=== 0–9 ===
- The 13th Regional Corporation

=== A ===
- Alaska Airlines
- Alaska-Juneau Gold Mining Company
- Alaska Newspapers, Inc.
- Anchorage Times
- Arctic Aircraft
- Arctic Circle Air
- Ashley HomeStore

=== B ===
- Bergmann Hotel
- Burl's Aircraft

=== E ===
- Era Aviation

=== F ===
- Flight Alaska
- Frontier Alaska

=== H ===
- Hageland Aviation Services

=== K ===
- Ketchikan Pulp Company

=== L ===
- L.A.B. Flying Service
- Lomen Company

=== M ===
- Manley & Mayer
- MarkAir
- McGee Airways

=== N ===
- National Bank of Alaska
- New Pacific Airlines

=== P ===
- PeaceHealth
- PenAir

=== R ===
- Ravn Alaska
- Reeve Aleutian Airways

=== S ===
- Star Air Service

=== V ===
- VECO Corporation

=== W ===
- Wards Cove Packing Company
- Wings of Alaska
- World Plus

== See also ==
- List of companies of the United States by state
