= List of newspapers in Alaska =

This is a list of newspapers in Alaska.

== Daily newspapers (currently published) ==
- Anchorage Daily News – Anchorage
- Daily Sitka Sentinel – Sitka
- Fairbanks Daily News-Miner – Fairbanks
- Juneau Empire – Juneau
- Ketchikan Daily News – Ketchikan
- Kodiak Daily Mirror – Kodiak
- Peninsula Clarion – Kenai

== Weekly newspapers (currently published) ==
- Alaska Journal of Commerce – Anchorage
- Arctic Sounder – Northwest Arctic Borough and North Slope Borough
- Bristol Bay Times – Bristol Bay
- Capital City Weekly – Juneau
- Chilkat Valley News – Haines
- Copper River Record - Glennallen
- Cordova Times – Cordova
- The Delta Discovery – Bethel
- Delta Wind – Delta Junction
- Homer News – Homer
- Mat-Su Valley Frontiersman – Wasilla / Matanuska-Susitna Valley (tri-weekly)
- The Nome Nugget – Nome
- Petersburg Pilot – Petersburg
- Petroleum News – Anchorage
- Seward Phoenix Log – Seward, Moose Pass
- Tundra Drums – Bethel and Yukon-Kuskokwim Delta
- The Wrangell Sentinel – Wrangell

== Monthly newspapers (currently published) ==
- The Skagway News – Skagway (bimonthly)

== University newspapers ==
- The Northern Light – University of Alaska Anchorage (weekly)
- Sun Star – University of Alaska Fairbanks (weekly)
- The Whalesong – University of Alaska Southeast

== Defunct newspapers ==
- Alaska Star – Eagle River and Chugiak
- Anchorage Press – Anchorage
- Anchorage Times – Anchorage
- Dutch Harbor Fisherman – Aleutians / Pribilofs
- The Ester Republic – Ester
- Homer Tribune – Homer
- Seward Journal – Seward
- Tundra Times – Fairbanks
- The Valdez Star – Valdez
- Northern Mirror – Wasilla

== See also ==
- List of African-American newspapers in Alaska
