= Economy of Alaska =

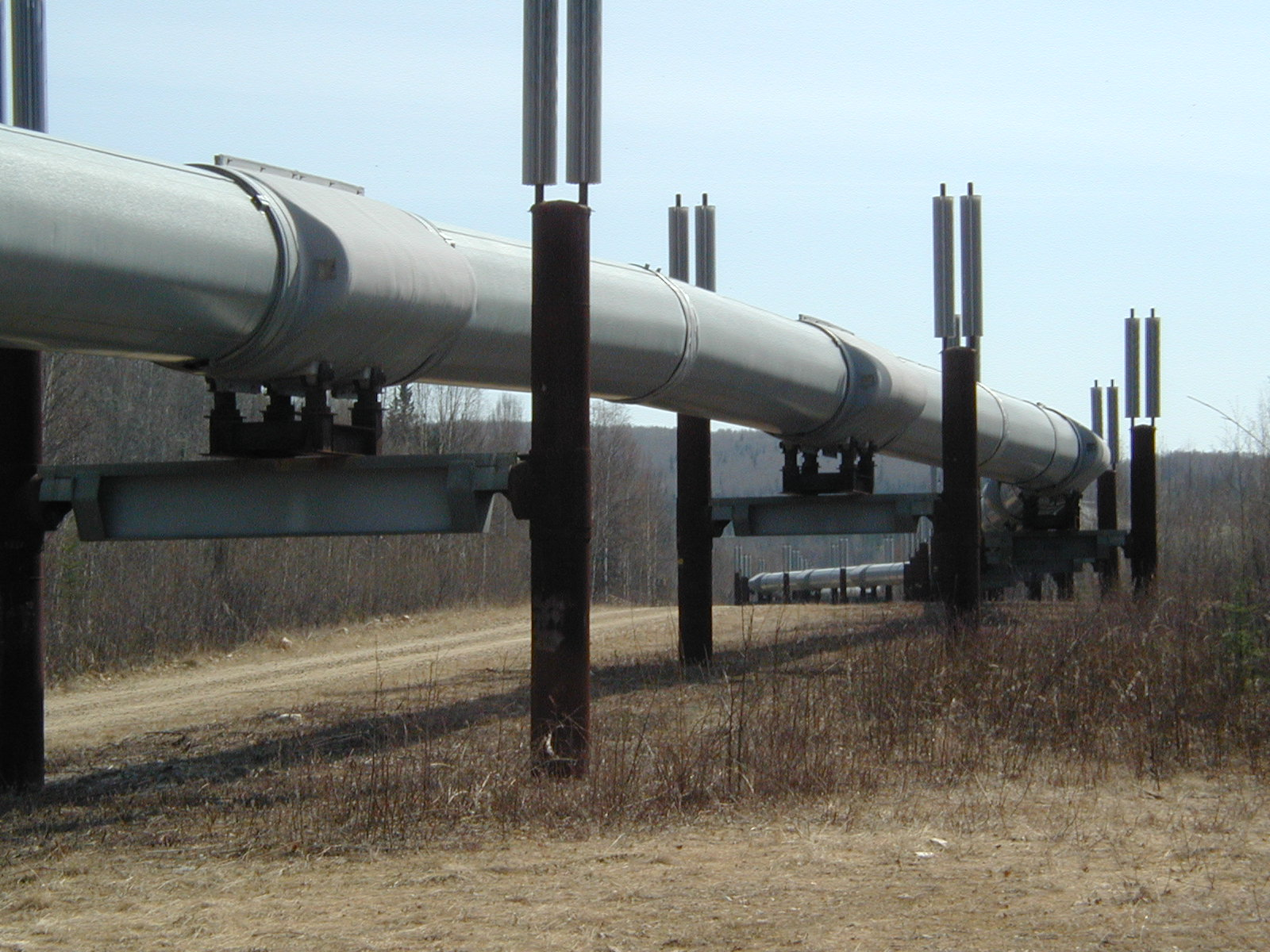
- The Trans-Alaska Pipeline transports oil, Alaska's most important export, from the North Slope to Valdez.

Statistics
- GDP: $63,618,000,000
- GDP per capita: $68,919
- Population below national poverty line: 15.7%
- Gini coefficient: .4492 ± 0.0118 (2023)
- Labor force: 364,209
- Unemployment: 3.8%

Public finance
- Revenue: 4,517,927,000
- Spending: 5,437,000,000

In a report compiled by the government of Alaska, the real GDP of Alaska was $51.1 billion in 2011, $52.9 billion in 2012 and $51.5 billion in 2013. The drop-off that occurred between 2012 and 2013 has been attributed to the decline in the mining sector, specifically the oil and gas sectors, a consequence of declined production. The state's economy has been described by University of Alaska Anchorage economist Scott Goldsmith as a "three-legged stool" – with one leg being the petroleum and gas industry, the second leg being the federal government and the third leg being all other industries and services. Between 2004 and 2006, the federal government was responsible for 135,000 Alaska jobs, the petroleum sector provided 110,000 jobs and all other industries and services combined for 122,000 jobs.

Alaska’s GDP in 2025 was $73.63 billion. The energy sector, including mining, quarrying, and oil and gas extraction, contributed approximately $10.57 billion to the state’s GDP during the same year.

Alaska's main export product after oil and natural gas is seafood, primarily salmon, cod, pollock, and crab. In the 2013 fishing season, Alaskan fishers were able to accumulate a total of 5.8 billion pounds of seafood with an evaluation of $1.9 billion, with 2012 having had a total of 5.3 billion and $1.7 billion respectively.

Agriculture represents only a very small fraction of the Alaskan economy. Agricultural production is primarily for consumption within the state and includes nursery stock, dairy products, vegetables, and livestock. Manufacturing is limited, with most food and general goods imported from elsewhere.

Employment is primarily in government and industries such as natural resource extraction, shipping, and transportation. Military bases are a significant component of the economy in both Fairbanks and Anchorage. Federal subsidies are also an important part of the economy, allowing the state to keep taxes low. Its industrial outputs are crude petroleum, natural gas, coal, gold, precious metals, zinc and other mining, seafood processing, timber and wood products. There is also a growing service and tourism sector. Tourists have contributed to the economy by supporting local lodging.

== History ==
Alaska's first cannery opened in 1878 to facilitate the selling of salmon.

== Economic sectors ==
=== Energy ===
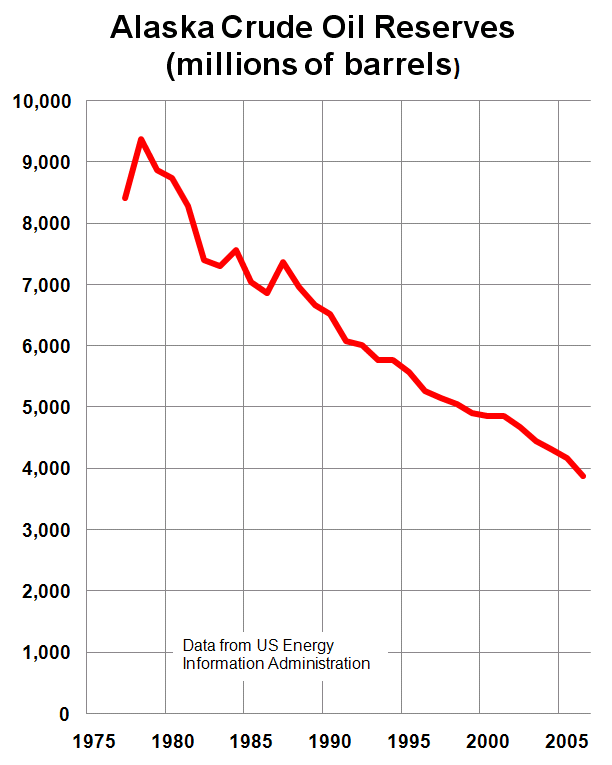
Alaska proven oil reserves peaked in 1973 and have declined more than 60% since then.

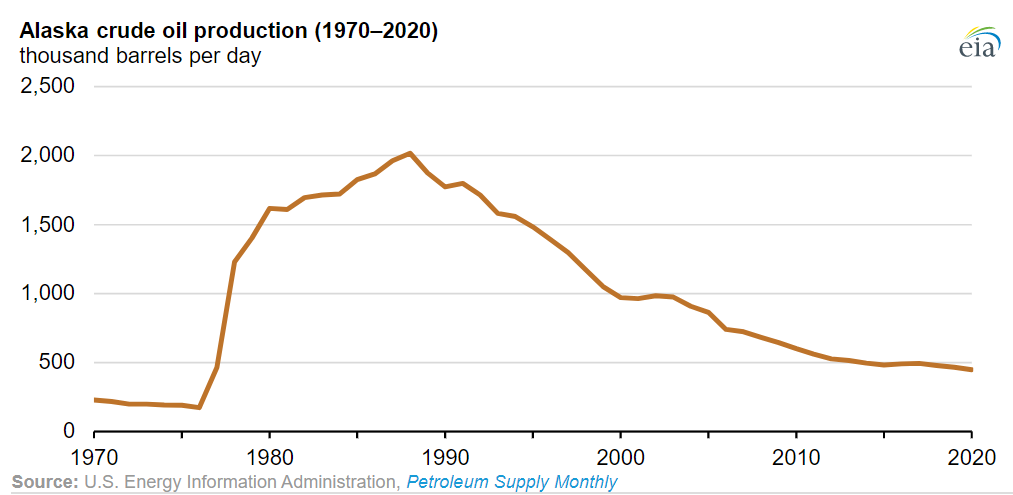
Alaskan oil production peaked in 1988 and has declined more than 75% since then.

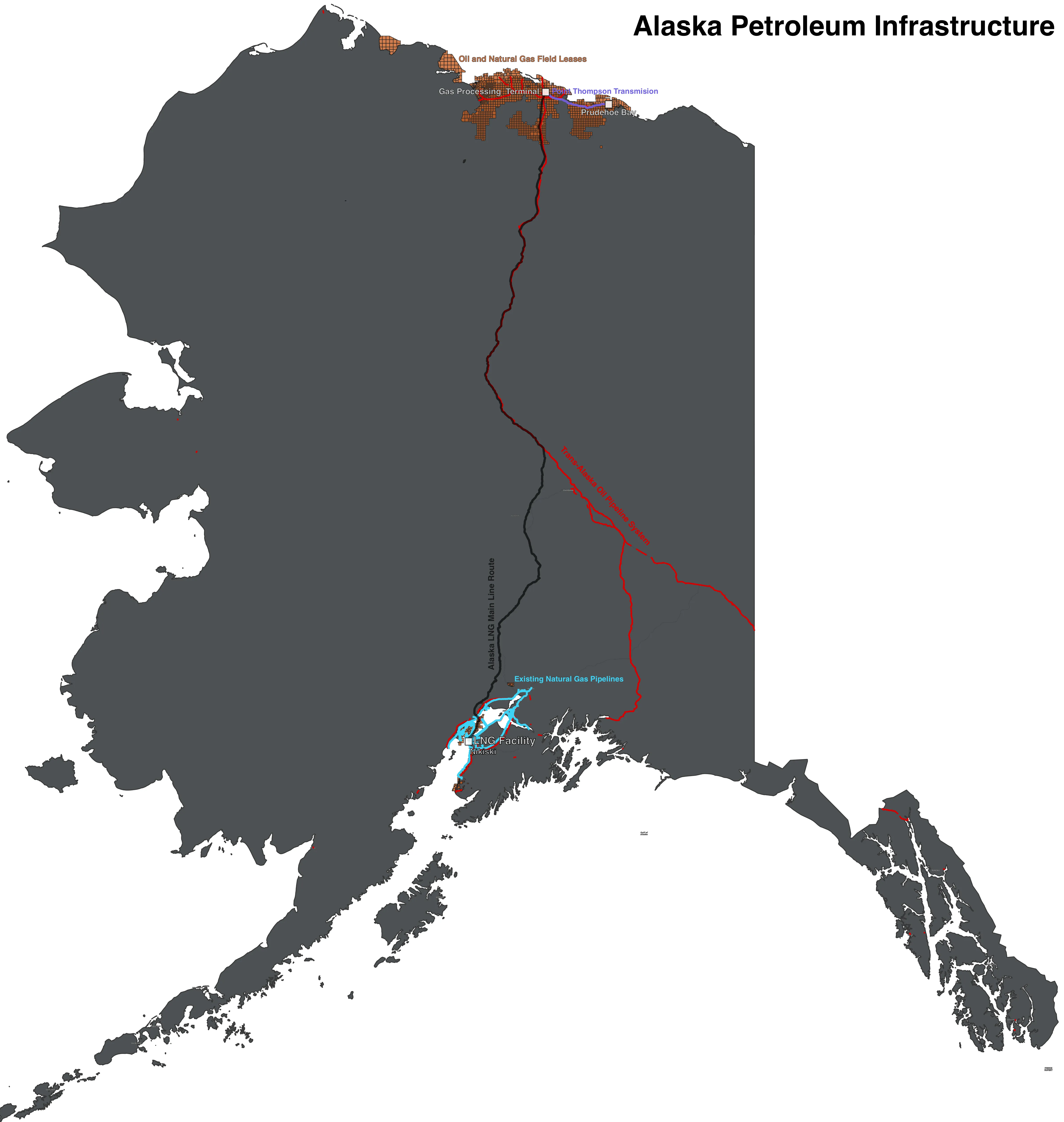
Alaska oil and natural gas pipelines, and proposed natural gas pipelines.

Alaska has vast energy resources. Major oil and gas reserves are found in the Alaska North Slope (ANS) and Cook Inlet basins. According to the Energy Information Administration, Alaska ranks fourth in the nation in crude oil production. Prudhoe Bay on Alaska's North Slope is the highest yielding oil field in the United States and on North America, typically producing about 400,000 barrels per day (64,000 m^{3}/d).

The Trans-Alaska Pipeline can transport up to 2.1 million barrels (330,000 m^{3}) of crude oil per day, more than any other crude oil pipeline in the United States. Additionally, substantial coal deposits are found in Alaska's bituminous, sub-bituminous, and lignite coal basins. The United States Geological Survey estimates that there are 85.4 trillion cubic feet (2,420 km^{3}) of undiscovered, technically recoverable gas from natural gas hydrates on the Alaskan North Slope. Alaska also offers some of the highest hydroelectric power potential in the country from its numerous rivers. Large swaths of the Alaskan coastline offer wind and geothermal energy potential as well.

Alaska's economy depends heavily on increasingly expensive diesel fuel for heating, transportation, electric power and light. Though wind and hydroelectric power are abundant and underdeveloped, proposals for statewide energy systems (e.g. with special low-cost electric interties) were judged uneconomical (at the time of the report, 2001) due to low (<$0.50/Gal) fuel prices, long distances and low population. The cost of a US gallon of gasoline in urban Alaska today is usually $0.30–$0.60 higher than the national average; prices in rural areas are generally significantly higher but vary widely depending on transportation costs, seasonal usage peaks, nearby petroleum development infrastructure and many other factors.

In 2012, Alaska accounted for 8.1% of American crude oil production, ranking behind Texas (30.6%), North Dakota (10.2%), and California (8.3%).

Developers are exploring new clean energy sources in Alaska, including offshore wind, geothermal power, tidal power, and green hydrogen.

=== Other resource extraction ===
See: Gold mining in Alaska

=== Tourism ===
Tourism in Alaska is the second-largest private sector employer, accounting for one in eight Alaskan jobs, nearly 2 million visitors, and $2.42 billion in direct visitor spending including labor income. Nearly half the visitors arrive to Alaska through the cruise industry including Carnival Cruise Line, Celebrity Cruises, Crystal Cruises, Disney Cruise Line, Holland America Line, Norwegian Cruise Line, Princess Cruises, Regent Seven Seas Cruises, Royal Caribbean Cruises Ltd., and Silversea Cruises. Other visitors arrive via the Ted Stevens Anchorage International Airport, driving along the main road access to the state, the Alaska Highway, or aboard the Alaska Marine Highway. In his 2015 state of the State address, Alaska Governor Bill Walker referred to the tourism industry as a "healthy and vital industry which showcases a dynamic partnership between private enterprise and state and local government, one that has the potential of limitless growth and contribution to our economic well-being.

Tourism is also a contributor to the state's general fund through various taxes, including a commercial passenger vessel excise tax rate of $34.50 per passenger, per voyage. Other taxes generated through tourism include a vehicle rental tax, as well as local sales and bed taxes. Under AS 43.52.020, the tax on passenger vehicle rentals is levied at 9 percent of total fees and costs where the rental is not arranged through a vehicle rental platform, and at 7 percent where it is arranged through one. A platform that arranged or executed more than 200 rentals in the state in the preceding calendar year is itself required to collect and remit the tax under AS 43.52.050. The reduced platform rate is scheduled to expire on 1 July 2028, after which the 9 percent rate applies to all passenger vehicle rentals.

According to a study prepared for the State of Alaska by the McDowell Group, "spending by Alaska visitors in 2014–15 was distributed widely throughout the state’s economy. Lodging, tours/activities, gifts/souvenirs, and food/beverage each accounted for about one-fifth of spending (18 to 20 percent)", while the remaining fifth includes packages and transportation.

Visitors are attracted to Alaska by various experiences often tied to the natural and vast characteristics of the landscape, wildlife, and culture of the state. There are many guided activities that provide a way for visitors to access these experiences and for local and multi-national companies alike to conduct business. Guided activities include sightseeing tours, whale watching, glacier viewing, flightseeing, wildlife viewing, hiking, ziplining, kayaking/rafting, and fishing. Fishing alone accounts for $652,498,723 in annual spending by non-residents including purchases of licenses, guides, equipment, and repair.

A top destination for tourism in Alaska includes the State's National Park system, featuring 24 units. Annually these national parks collectively are visited by 2.6 million people and contribute a $1.1 billion economic benefit.

=== Agriculture ===
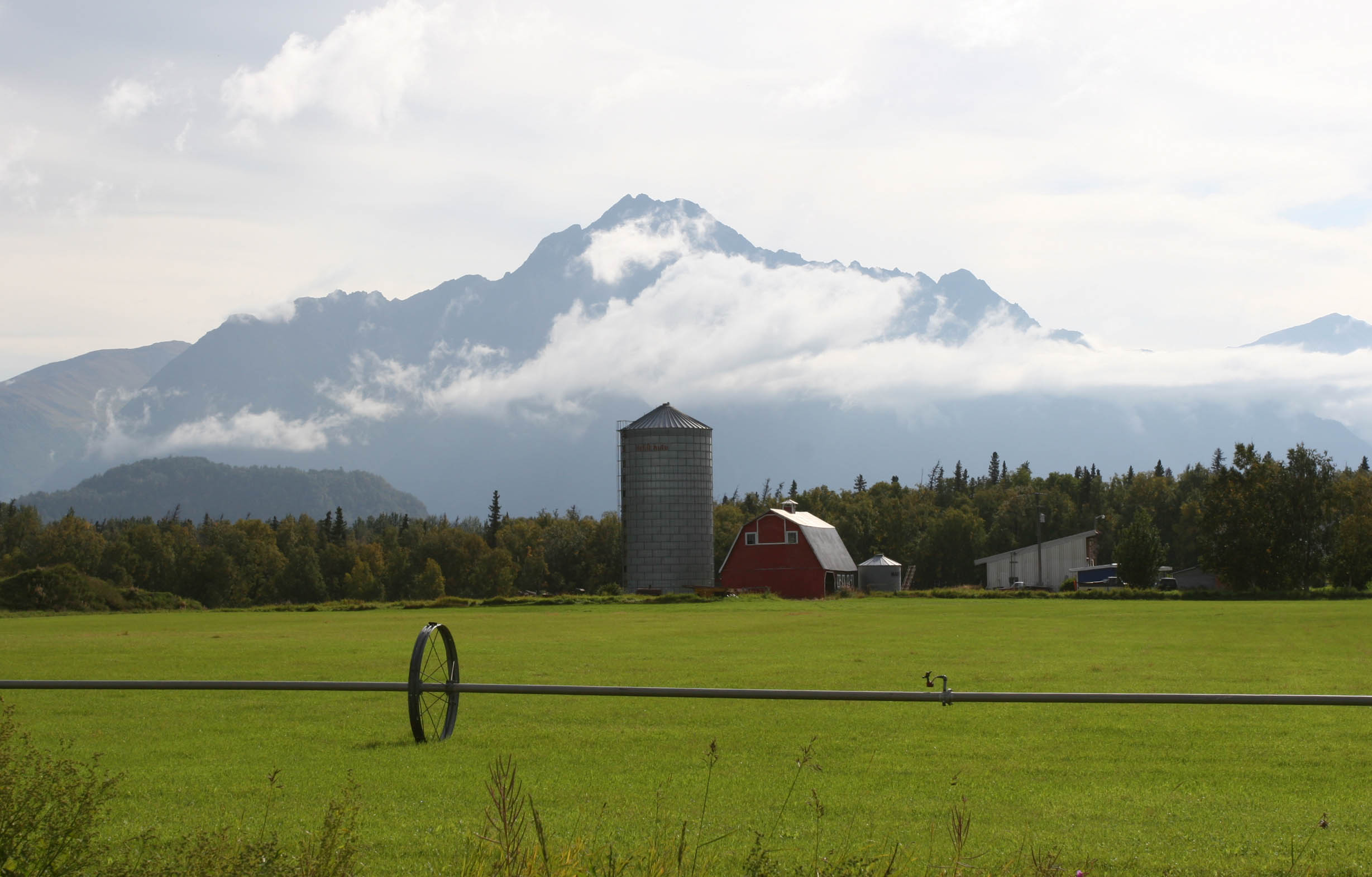
A farm in the Matanuska Valley

Due to the northern climate and steep terrain, relatively little farming occurs in Alaska. Most farms are in either the Matanuska Valley, about 40 miles (64 km) northeast of Anchorage, or on the Kenai Peninsula, about 60 miles (97 km) southwest of Anchorage. The short 100-day growing season limits the crops that can be grown, but the long sunny summer days make for productive growing seasons. The primary crops are potatoes, carrots, lettuce, and cabbage. Farmers exhibit produce at the Alaska State Fair. "Alaska Grown" is used as an agricultural slogan.

Alaska has an abundance of seafood, with the primary fisheries in the Bering Sea and the North Pacific, and seafood is one of the few food items that is often cheaper within the state than outside it. Many Alaskans fish the rivers during salmon season to gather significant quantities of their household diet while fishing for subsistence, sport, or both.

Hunting for subsistence, primarily caribou, moose, and Dall sheep is still common in the state, particularly in remote Bush communities. An example of a traditional native food is Akutaq, the Eskimo ice cream, which can consist of reindeer fat, seal oil, dried fish meat and local berries.

Alaska's reindeer herding is concentrated on the Seward Peninsula where wild caribou can be prevented from mingling and migrating with the domesticated reindeer.

Most food in Alaska is transported into the state from "Outside", and shipping costs make food in the cities relatively expensive. In rural areas, subsistence hunting and gathering is an essential activity because imported food is prohibitively expensive. The cost of importing food to villages begins at 7¢ per pound (15¢/kg) and rises rapidly to 50¢ per pound ($1.10/kg) or more. The cost of delivering a 1 US gallon (3.8 L) of milk is about $3.50 in many villages where per capita income can be $20,000 or less. Fuel cost can exceed $8.00 per gallon.

== Permanent Fund ==
The Alaska Permanent Fund is a legislatively controlled appropriation established in 1976 to manage a surplus in state petroleum revenues from the recently constructed Trans-Alaska Pipeline System. From its initial principal of $734,000, the fund has grown to $40 billion as a result of oil royalties and capital investment programs.

Starting in 1982, dividends from the fund's annual growth have been paid out each year to eligible Alaskans, ranging from $331.29 in 1984 to $3,269.00 in 2008 (which included a one-time $1200 "Resource Rebate"). Every year, the state legislature takes out 8 percent from the earnings, puts 3 percent back into the principal for inflation proofing, and the remaining 5 percent is distributed to all qualifying Alaskans. To qualify for the Alaska State Permanent Fund one must have lived in the state for a minimum of 12 months, and maintain constant residency.

== Cost of living ==
The cost of goods in Alaska has long been higher than in the contiguous 48 states. This has changed for the most part in Anchorage and to a lesser extent in Fairbanks, where the cost of living has dropped somewhat in the past five years. Federal government employees, particularly United States Postal Service (USPS) workers and active-duty military members, receive a Cost of Living Allowance usually set at 25% of base pay because, while the cost of living has gone down, it is still one of the highest in the country.

The introduction of big-box stores in Anchorage, Fairbanks (Wal-Mart in March 2004), and Juneau also did much to lower prices. However, rural Alaska suffers from extremely high prices for food and consumer goods, compared to the rest of the country due to the relatively limited transportation infrastructure. Many rural residents come into these cities and purchase food and goods in bulk from warehouse clubs like Costco and Sam's Club. Some have embraced the free shipping offers of some online retailers to purchase items much more cheaply than they could in their own communities, if they are available at all.

== Largest employers ==
According to the Alaska Department of Labor and Workforce Development, the following were the state's largest private sector employers in 2010:

Rank	Name	Average Monthly Employment in 2010
1	Providence Health & Services	4,000+
2	Walmart/Sam's Club	3,000–3,249
3	Carrs Safeway Alaska Division	2,750–2,999
4	Fred Meyer	2,500–2,749
5	ASRC Energy Services	2,500–2,749
6	Trident Seafoods	2,250–2,499
7	BP Exploration Alaska	2,000–2,249
8	CH2M Hill	1,750–1,999
9	NANA Management Services	1,750–1,999
10	Alaska Native Tribal Health Consortium	1,500–1,749
11	Alaska Airlines	1,500–1,749
12	GCI Communications	1,250–1,499
13	Banner Health (including Fairbanks Memorial Hospital)	1,250–1,499
14	Southcentral Foundation	1,250–1,499
15	Yukon-Kuskokwim Health Corporation	1,000–1,249
16	FedEx	1,000–1,249
17	ConocoPhillips	1,000–1,249
18	Alaska USA Federal Credit Union	1,000–1,249
19	United Parcel Service (UPS)	1,000–1,249
20	McDonald's Restaurants of Alaska	750–999
21	Wells Fargo	750–999
22	Doyon Universal Services	750–999
23	Home Depot	750–999
24	Alaska Regional Hospital	750–999
25	The Alaska Club	750–999
26	Icicle Seafoods	750–999
27	Southeast Alaska Regional Health Consortium (SEARHC)	750–999
28	Hope Community Resources	750–999
29	UniSea	750–999
30	Alaska Commercial Company	750–999
31	Costco	750–999
32	Spenard Builders Supply	750–999
33	Lowe's	750–999
34	Alyeska Pipeline Service Company	750–999
35	Alaska Communications Systems (ACS)	500–749
36	First National Bank Alaska	500–749
37	Central Peninsula Hospital	500–749
38	First Student	500–749
39	Westward Seafoods	500–749
40	Mat-Su Regional Medical Center	500–749
41	Alaska Consumer Direct Personal Care	500–749
42	Tanana Chiefs Conference	500–749
43	PeterPan Seafoods	500–749
44	Udelhoven Oilfield System Services	500–749
45	Job Ready (ReadyCare)	500–749
46	Schlumberger Technologies	500–749
47	Maniilaq Association	500–749
48	Alaska Hotel Properties (Princess Lodges)	500–749
49	Alyeska Resort (includes O'Malley's on the Green)	500–749
50	Ocean Beauty Seafoods	250–499

== See also ==
- Alaska locations by per capita income
- Hunting and fishing in Alaska
- List of Alaska companies
