= Credit Union 1 =

Credit Union 1 may refer to:

- Credit Union 1 (Alaska), a credit union based in Anchorage

== See also ==
- Golden 1 Credit Union
