= Robert Hallinen =

American journalist (1948–2026)

- Born: Robert James Hallinen; October 25, 1948; Marquette, Michigan, U.S.
- Died: July 26, 2026 (aged 77); Anchorage, Alaska, U.S.
- Occupations: Photojournalist, editor
- Years active: 1970–2018
- Employers: Anchorage Daily News (1985–2018); Anchorage Times; Ketchikan Daily News
- Spouse: Darlene Wells
- Children: 2
- Awards: Pulitzer Prize for Public Service (1989, contributor); NPPA Regional Photographer of the Year (1996)

Robert James Hallinen (October 25, 1948 – July 26, 2026) was an American photojournalist and editor. He worked for Anchorage Daily News for 33 years. He won the newspaper's 1989 Pulitzer Prize for Public Service for the "People in Peril" series, and he was named a Pulitzer Prize finalist in 1990 for his coverage of the Exxon Valdez oil spill.

== Early life ==
Robert James Hallinen was born in Marquette, Michigan on October 25, 1948. He was the son of Hans Hallinen, and his wife, Esther Hallinen. Hallinen had four siblings, Bruce, Cheryl, David, and Lorriann. In 1970, he studied at Northern Michigan University, when he began his career in photography as a student assistant to the university photographer. He worked for the local newspapers in Michigan before moving to Alaska.

== Career ==
Hallinen worked for many local newspapers in Michigan before accepting a one-year position deal with the Ketchikan Daily News in Ketchikan, Alaska. He joined the staff of the Anchorage Times and then the Anchorage Daily News. During his 33 years in Anchorage Daily News, he documented. He made a contribution to the paper's People in Peril series, which was awarded the 1989 Pulitzer Prize for Public Service. In 1990, Hallinen and other photographers Erik Hill and Paul Souders were named Pulitzer Prize Finalist for spot news photography for their visual coverage of the Exxon Valdez oil spill. In 1996, he was named Regional Photographer of the Year by the National Press Photographers Association.

He covered 12 runnings of the Iditarod Trail Sled Dog Race. During one race assignment, the ski of his landing plane broke off on river ice, and during another, he suffered broken ribs after being thrown off a snowmobile while attempting to catch an airline transport to return film to Anchorage. He retired from the Anchorage Daily News in 2018.

== Personal life and death ==
Hallinen was married to Darlene Wells, with whom he had two children. He died from cancer in Anchorage, on July 26, 2026, at the age of 77.
