= The Polar Express (disambiguation) =

The Polar Express is a children's book by Chris Van Allsburg.

The Polar Express or Polar Express may also refer to:

- The Polar Express (film), a 2004 animated film based on the book
  - The Polar Express (soundtrack), the film's soundtrack
- The Polar Express (video game), a 2004 video game based on the film
- Polar Express (cable system), a proposed Arctic submarine communication cable

== See also ==
- Polar Bear Express, a Canadian passenger train
