= The Politics Book =

2013 non-fiction book

- Author: Rod Dacombe, Paul Kelly, John Farndon, Jesper Johnsøn, A.S. Hodson, Niall Kishtainy, James Meadway, Anca Pusca, Marcus Weeks
- Publication date: 2013

The Politics Book is a book originally published by DK in 2013. The book features sections about modern politics around the world, as well as historical evidence. It contains articles about many political doctrines, including Communism and Liberalism. The book was written by a group of nine contributors: Rod Dacombe, Paul Kelly, John Farndon, Jesper Johnsøn, A.S. Hodson, Niall Kishtainy, James Meadway, Anca Pusca and Marcus Weeks.

== Reception ==
In a positive review, the Library Journal's Susanne Caro said that the book offers "a helpful introduction" to the concepts and philosophies that have shaped global rulers over time. She liked how the "bright, bold colors and illustrations" contribute to a more accessible presentation of the topic. Jan Gardner of The Boston Globe had a similar view, stating that the work is "an accessible introduction to centuries of political thought". She observed, however, that "the political views of the editors become apparent from time to time". Fairbanks Daily News-Miner's library columnist, Greg Hill, found the survey of political history to be "distilled and simplified" though praised it for being "easily digestible".
