= JFI =

JFI may refer to:

- JetFlite International
- Jesus Freaks (youth movement)
- Judo Federation of India
- .jfi, a file extension for JPEG
