= Far North Fiber =

Proposed submarine optic-fiber cable in the Arctic Ocean

Far North Fiber, also called Far North Fiber Express Route, is a proposed 14,000 km long submarine fiber-optic cable connecting Japan and Europe by traversing the Northwest Passage. The cable was proposed in December, 2021 by Finnish company Cinia and Far North Digital of Anchorage, Alaska.

== History ==
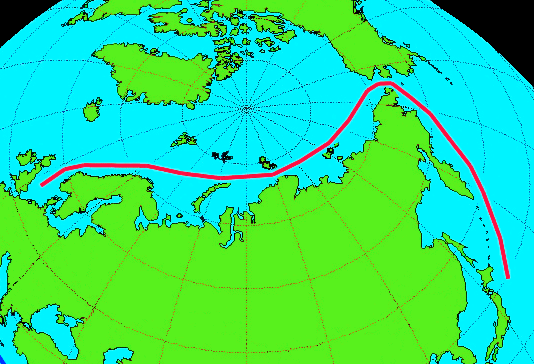
Original cable route nearly followed the Northern Sea Route

A 10,600 km Japan–Europe cable via the Northeast Passage polar route was conceived by Cinia and the Russian company MegaFon in 2018, and feasibility studies were conducted circa 2020 around the Norwegian enterprise Bredbåndsfylket Arctic Link AS.

In March 2021, Cinia, Bredbåndsfylket, and MegaFon announced plans to create a Japan–Norway span through the Northeast Passage, called Arctic Connect. The Arctic Connect plans fell through in May, and it was reconfigured as Far North. The Russian government began laying cable on its own Northeast Passage six-pair submarine fiber system, Polar Express, in August 2021.
