= Seward Phoenix Log =

American newspaper founded in Seward, Alaska

The Seward Phoenix Log
- Type: Online newspaper
- Founded: October 6, 1966
- Country: United States
- ISSN: 1937-2191
- OCLC number: 39325954
- Website: www.thesewardphoenixlog.com

The Seward Phoenix Log is an American online newspaper founded in Seward, Alaska, in 1966. It was originally published as a weekly print newspaper and now publishes news digitally.

The newspaper was established by Beverly and Willard Dunham and Joanne Hoogland. Its first issue was published on October 6, 1966. The publication historically covered Seward and surrounding Alaska communities. Its online edition publishes Alaska coverage alongside national, international, business and entertainment news.

== History ==
=== Founding ===
The first issue of the Seward Phoenix Log, designated volume 1, number 1, was published on October 6, 1966. The Library of Congress records it as an English-language weekly newspaper published in Seward.

The newspaper was founded by Beverly and Willard Dunham with Joanne Hoogland. Beverly Dunham served as an editor and publisher of the newspaper.

According to a history published by the Peninsula Clarion, the name Phoenix Log referred to the Phoenix, a Russian vessel built in the Resurrection Bay area during the late 19th century.

=== Alaska Newspapers, Inc. ===
The Seward Phoenix Log later became one of the community newspapers published by Alaska Newspapers, Inc. The company was incorporated in Alaska in 1990 and operated as a subsidiary of Calista Corporation. Its publications included the Seward Phoenix Log, Arctic Sounder, Bering Strait Record, Bristol Bay Times, Cordova Times, Dutch Harbor Fisherman, Tundra Drums and Valdez Vanguard.

In 2011, Calista Corporation sold the Seward Phoenix Log and Tundra Drums to Edgar Blatchford, who had previously owned the Seward newspaper and helped establish Alaska Newspapers, Inc.

Blatchford said at the time that the publication would continue without missing an issue and that he intended to restore a newspaper office in Seward. He also said that the publication would gradually expand into web-based publishing while continuing to serve readers of the print newspaper.

=== Print publication and online operations ===
In December 2017, the Seward Journal announced that its print publication would be combined with the Seward Phoenix Log. The combination ended publication of the Seward Phoenix Log as a separate weekly print edition.

The Seward Phoenix Log continues to operate as an online newspaper through its website. The website publishes breaking news and coverage of Alaska, business, entertainment, national affairs and international events.

== Archives ==
Records relating to the newspaper are held by the Archives and Special Collections department of the University of Alaska Anchorage and Alaska Pacific University Consortium Library. The Alaska Newspapers, Inc. collection contains photographs and other files from the Seward Phoenix Log, including materials dating from 1989 to 2004.

The Library of Congress maintains a bibliographic record for the newspaper under ISSN 1937-2191 and OCLC number 39325954.

== See also ==
- List of newspapers in Alaska
