= Moose's Tooth Pub & Pizzeria =

Restaurant in Anchorage, Alaska

Coordinates: 61.1905°N 149.8690°W

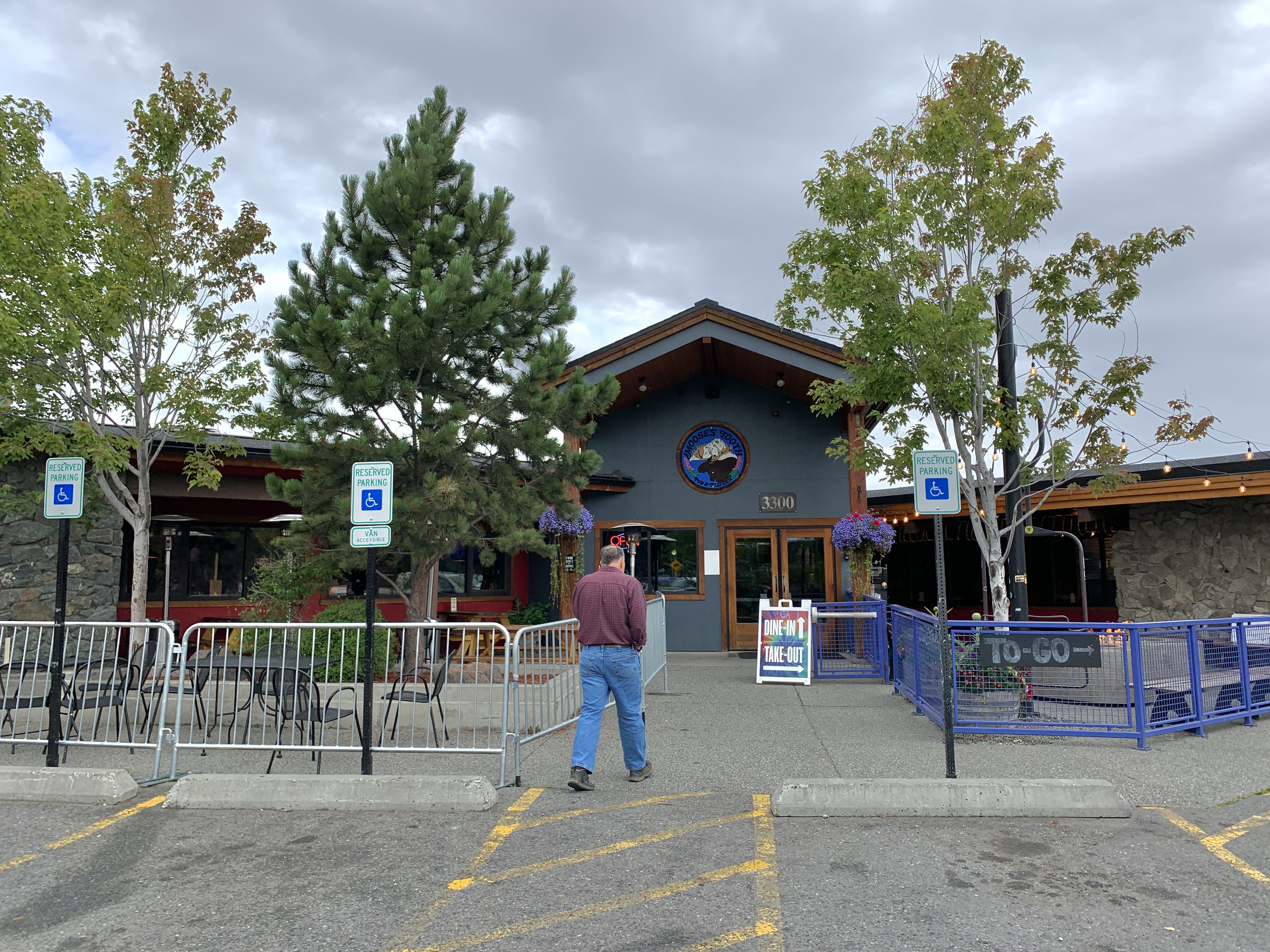
- Interactive map of Moose's Tooth Pub & Pizzeria

Restaurant information
- Established: 1996
- Owners: Rod Hancock; Warren Hancock
- Food type: Italian/American
- Location: 3300 Old Seward Hwy, Anchorage, Alaska, 99503, United States
- Website: Moose’s Tooth Pub & Pizzeria

Moose's Tooth Pub & Pizzeria is a pizzeria and brewery located in Anchorage, Alaska. The restaurant was ranked as the 3rd best pizzeria in the United States after Juliana's Pizza in New York City and Pizza Time of St. Augustine in St. Augustine, Florida in 2015.

== History ==
Moose's Tooth was opened by rock climbers Rod Hancock and Matt Jones in 1996 when there was a large boom in the brewpub trend happening. The location that they chose was considered to be cursed as many previous businesses failed here, but Hancock and Jones kept their optimism. Soon Moose's Tooth became one of the busiest restaurants in Anchorage. With their renowned success, the pair decided they would diversify and open a second restaurant, Bear Tooth Theatrepub, with help from Hancock's brother, Warren. The team also owns Broken Tooth Brewing which, in conjunction with Bear Tooth Theatrepub, employs over 500 people and recently purchased a large property in Spenard.

The brands company names derive from three mountains in the Ruth Gorge area of Denali National Park: Moose's Tooth, Bear Tooth, and Broken Tooth respectively.

Moose's Tooth is currently the highest-grossing single-unit independent pizzeria in the United States generating up to $6 million in gross revenue annually.

The pizzeria is known for its Apricot pie which consists of apricot sauce, carrots, cream cheese and chicken.

== Awards ==
2018

- Best Pizza - Anchorage Press
