= Pizza Time of St. Augustine =

Coordinates: 29.89392°N 81.31305°W

Pizza Time
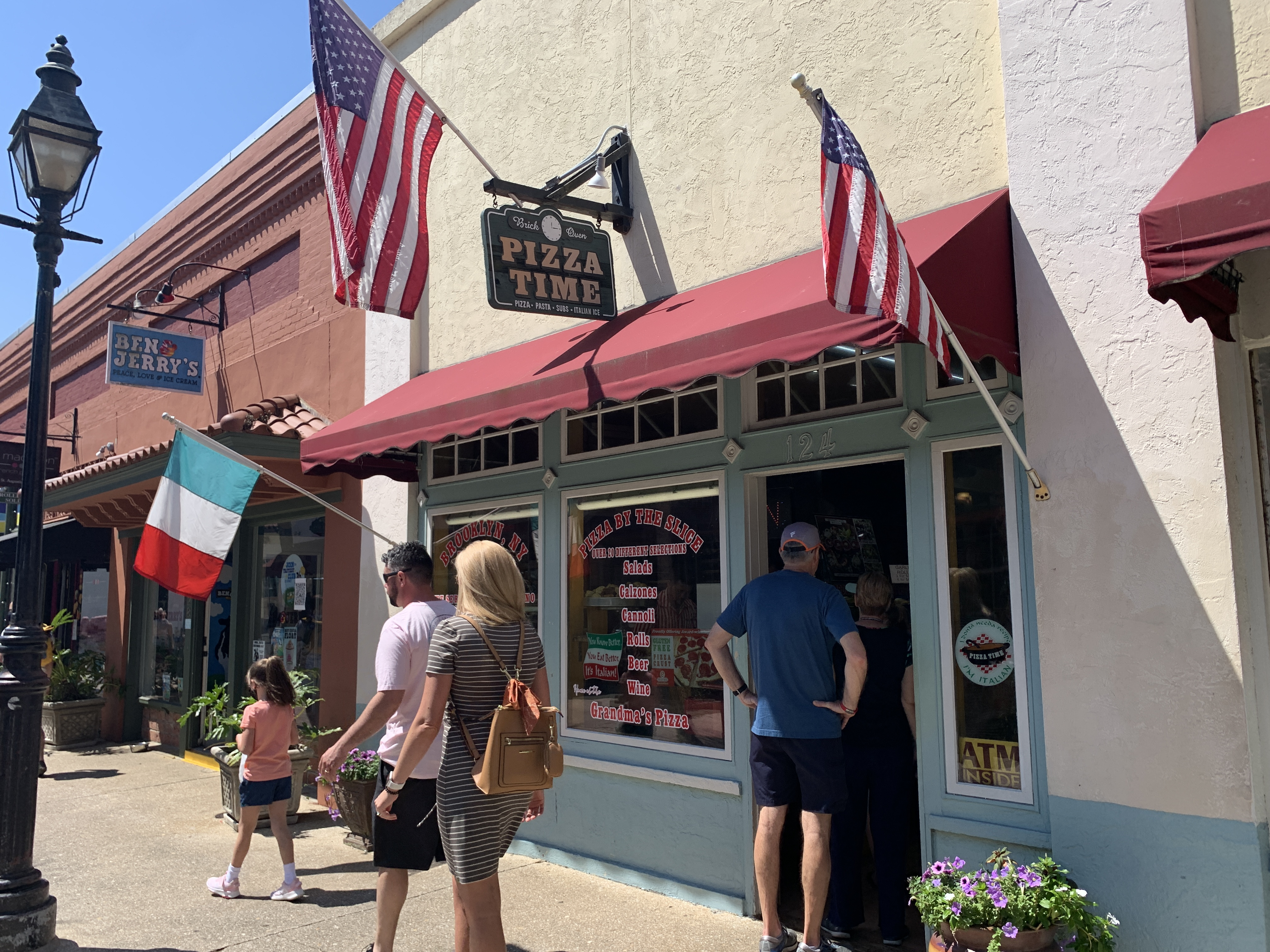
- Interactive map of Pizza Time

Restaurant information
- Established: 2005; 21 years ago
- Owner: Domenico Conslignarnio
- Head chef: Domenico Conslignarnio
- Food type: Italian pizzeria
- Location: 124 St George St., St. Augustine, Florida, 32084, United States

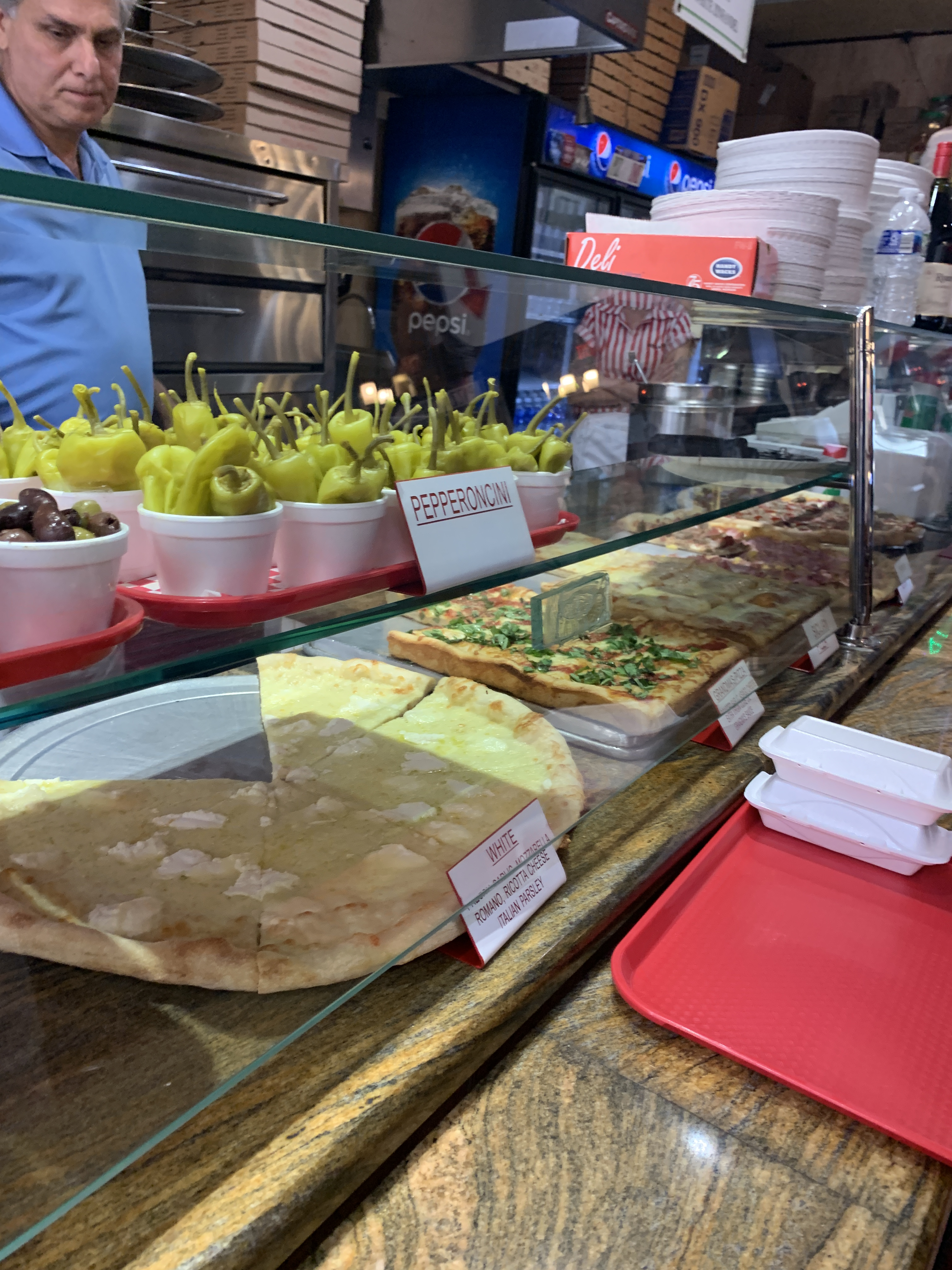
Interior view

Pizza Time is a pizzeria located in St. Augustine, Florida considered the second-highest rated pizzeria in the United States as of 2015 after Juliana's Pizza. The pizzeria opened in 2005.

== See also ==
- List of Italian restaurants
