= List of Alaska locations by per capita income =

Alaska has the seventh-highest per capita income in the United States, at $30,651 (2014). Its personal per capita income is $33,568 (2003), the twelfth-highest in the country. Its median household income is $69,825 (2014), ranked second in the country, and its median family income is $82,870 (2014), the fifth-highest in the country. The median value of an owner-occupied housing unit is $144,201 (2000), ranked twelfth in the country.

== Alaska boroughs and census areas ranked by per capita income ==
Note: Data is from the 2010 United States Census Data and the 2006–2010 American Community Survey 5-Year Estimates.

Rank	Borough or Census Area		Per capita income	Median household income	Median family income	Population	Number of households
1	Denali	Borough	$42,245	$72,500	$81,500	1,826	806
2	Skagway	Borough	$35,536	$73,500	$87,361	968	436
3	Juneau	Borough	$34,923	$75,517	$88,536	31,275	12,187
4	Anchorage	Borough	$34,678	$73,004	$85,023	291,826	107,332
5	Bristol Bay	Borough	$31,260	$84,000	$92,308	997	423
6	Petersburg	Census Area	$30,971	$62,317	$76,063	3,815	1,599
	Alaska	State	$30,726	$66,521	$77,886	710,231	258,058
7	Valdez-Cordova	Census Area	$30,703	$60,383	$76,625	9,636	3,966
8	Fairbanks North Star	Borough	$30,395	$66,598	$79,913	97,581	36,441
9	Sitka	Borough	$29,982	$62,024	$70,875	8,881	3,545
10	Aleutians West	Census Area	$29,920	$72,917	$81,875	5,561	1,212
11	Ketchikan Gateway	Borough	$29,520	$61,695	$78,440	13,477	5,305
12	Kenai Peninsula	Borough	$29,127	$57,454	$71,278	55,400	22,161
13	Wrangell	Borough	$28,731	$50,389	$53,688	2,369	1,053
14	Yakutat	Borough	$28,576	$65,750	$90,833	662	270
15	Haines	Borough	$27,979	$47,981	$69,821	2,508	1,149
16	Matanuska-Susitna	Borough	$27,910	$67,703	$76,247	88,995	31,824
17	Southeast Fairbanks	Census Area	$27,657	$59,596	$63,125	7,029	2,567
	United States	Country	$27,334	$51,914	$62,982	308,745,538	116,716,292
18	Kodiak Island	Borough	$26,413	$60,776	$65,605	13,592	4,630
19	Hoonah-Angoon	Census Area	$24,932	$43,750	$50,257	2,150	913
20	Prince of Wales-Hyder	Census Area	$24,193	$45,728	$51,000	5,559	2,194
21	Dillingham	Census Area	$22,597	$60,800	$64,113	4,847	1,563
22	Aleutians East	Borough	$22,279	$54,375	$61,250	3,141	553
23	North Slope	Borough	$22,109	$68,517	$70,650	9,430	2,029
24	Northwest Arctic	Borough	$21,278	$55,217	$52,807	7,523	1,919
25	Nome	Census Area	$20,549	$53,899	$52,694	9,492	2,815
26	Yukon-Koyukuk	Census Area	$18,614	$33,712	$45,000	5,588	2,217
27	Bethel	Census Area	$18,584	$52,214	$55,402	17,013	4,651
28	Lake and Peninsula	Borough	$15,161	$40,909	$47,266	1,631	553
29	Kusilvak	Census Area	$11,269	$37,955	$37,284	7,459	1,745
