= Alaska Newspapers, Inc. =

News publisher in Anchorage, Alaska

Alaska Newspapers, Inc. (ANI) was, until August 2011, the publisher of six weekly Alaska newspapers, a quarterly magazine, and several special publications including a shopper, visitor's guides, and programs.

ANI was founded by Edgar Blatchford in 1983 with the purchase of the Seward Phoenix Log. In 1990, The Tundra Drums was added to the company's portfolio in a partnership with Calista Corporation, an Alaska Native Regional Corporation created under the Alaska Native Claims Settlement Act of 1971. ANI has its headquarters in Anchorage, Alaska and is currently a majority-owned subsidiary of Calista.

== Newspapers ==
Alaska Newspapers, Inc. (ANI), published six weekly newspapers serving Bush Alaska. As of August 2011, all of these newspapers had been sold or were in the process of being sold to new owners. The Arctic Sounder, the Bristol Bay Times and the Dutch Harbor Fisherman were sold to new publishers Jason Evans and Kiana Peacock. The Seward Phoenix Log and the Tundra Drums were sold to Edgar Blatchford. The Cordova Times was sold to Jennifer Gibbins, who was editor of the paper for the last year.

- Arctic Sounder, serving the Northwest Arctic Borough and the North Slope Borough;
- Bristol Bay Times serving the Bristol Bay communities of Dillingham, King Salmon, Naknek, and surrounding villages.
- Cordova Times serving Cordova and Prince William Sound.
- Dutch Harbor Fisherman serving communities in the Aleutians and Pribilofs.
- Seward Phoenix Log serving the eastern Kenai Peninsula communities of Seward, Moose Pass, and Cooper Landing.
- Tundra Drums serving Bethel and other villages on the Yukon-Kuskokwim Delta.

ANI formerly published three additional newspapers, the Anchorage Chronicle, the Valdez Vanguard and The Bering Strait Record. The Anchorage Chronicle, a general-interest weekly newspaper serving Anchorage, began publication in 2001, but shut down in 2004 due to its failure in the highly competitive Anchorage market to gain enough subscriptions or rack sales to entice advertisers. The Valdez Vanguard, a weekly newspaper serving Valdez, was sold in 2003 to its competitor, the Valdez Star. The Bering Strait Record was founded in Nome, Alaska in 1997, but was closed by publisher Chris Casati in 2000.

== Other publications ==
Alaska Newspapers, Inc. also publishes the quarterly magazine First Alaskans.

The Alaska Bush Shopper is a monthly shopping guide for residents of Bush Alaska. Alaska Bush Shopper is distributed via mail to over 230 regional villages in addition to being included as an insert in ANI's weekly newspapers.

ANI's other publications include a quarterly statewide health feature called Healthy Life; the monthly feature Kids These Days highlighting achievements of youth in villages and communities around Alaska; the annual feature Career & Education Guide' programs for annual events including the Camai Dance Festival, the Seward Silver Salmon Derby, the Seward Mount Marathon Race, and visitor's guides to Dutch Harbor and Unalaska, Seward, and Prince William Sound.

== Camai Printing ==
ANI's subsidiary Camai Printing, also headquartered in Anchorage, provides traditional print services, such as printing of letterhead, business cards, 4-color posters, brochures, and envelopes as well as newsprint web press printing services.

== See also ==
- List of newspapers in Alaska
