= Alaska Flour Company =

Flour mill in Alaska, United States

The Alaska Flour Company is a commercial flour mill in Alaska. The enterprise is the only one of its kind in the state. The company produces whole grain flour, barley flour, cream-of-barley cereal, and other flour products. Its facility is located in Delta Junction.

== History ==
Alaska Flour Company was founded in 2011 by Bryce and Jan Wrigley as a family-owned company. The former is a grain farmer and the president of Alaska Farm Bureau. According to Wrigley, he started planning to build the flour mill after witnessing the impact of Hurricane Katrina in 2005 and becoming concerned about Alaska's food security and supply lines. During this period, Alaska sourced 95% of its grain outside of the state and Wrigley feared a natural disaster such could expose Alaska to risk. In addition, Wrigley stated he wanted to help expand markets for other Alaska farmers by offering them a local site to mill produce.

The company’s facility was constructed after Bryce Wrigley and his wife visited mills from different parts of the United States. Components of the flour mill and equipment were sourced from Pennsylvania, North Carolina, and Michigan. The mill constitutes one of the two operations that Wrigley runs. The other, Wrigley Farms, is a farming operation the Wrigleys have operated for four generations. During its initial operations in 2011, the electric-powered mill was able to produce 20, 40, or 100-mesh grain at a capacity of up to 1,000 pounds of flour per hour.
