= FS Air Service =

Airline of the United States

F.S. Air Service
IATA	ICAO	Call sign
4A	EYE	SOCKEYE
- Founded: 1986
- Fleet size: 1
- Headquarters: Anchorage, Alaska, USA

FS Air Service is an American airline based in Anchorage, Alaska, USA. It was established in 1986 by Floyd Saltz, and operates regional passenger and cargo services, as well as cargo charters. In 1996, FS Air acquired a LearJet 35, which became the cornerstone of its medevac business. At its height, FS operated 2 Lears, 3 Metroliners, 2 Merlins, a Casa, and 2 Navajos.

FS holds the distinction of being the inaugural FAR Part 135 Aviation Operator in Alaska to be under the ownership and operation of a woman, Sandi Saltz. This transition followed an incident involving Sandi's husband, Floyd, who experienced a controlled descent into terrain upon arrival at St. George Island, AK. (NTSB Accident Number ANC98FA091) Later that year, Robert Cannon assumed the role of vice president.

In January 2005, the FS Air Service fleet consisted of one CASA C-212-200 Aviocar.

The financial situation of the business is unclear. During a major scheduled operation on Robert, the owner and son opted to consolidate. Robert was released from the hospital during his recovery, and new management decisions resulted in less effective business planning, leading to the loss of the company's medivac contracts. Ultimately, F.S. Air Service reportedly filed for bankruptcy and closed shortly thereafter.
