= The Seward Journal =

Newspaper in Seward, Alaska

- Type: Weekly newspaper
- Format: Print
- Editor: Vanta Shafer
- Founded: 2010
- Ceased publication: 2023
- Headquarters: 215 4th Ave; Seward, AK 99664; United States

The Seward Journal was a weekly tabloid format newspaper published in the City of Seward, Alaska. The paper was distributed by home delivery subscription and was sold in grocery stores, coffee houses and hotels around Seward. The final issue was published November 29, 2023. Loss of the paper, which was caused by a lack of local advertising, an increase in production costs, and difficulty keeping staff in Seward, removed one of the Kenai Peninsula's last remaining news sources.
