= Daily Sitka Sentinel =

Weekday newspaper in Sitka, Alaska, United States

Sitka Sentinel

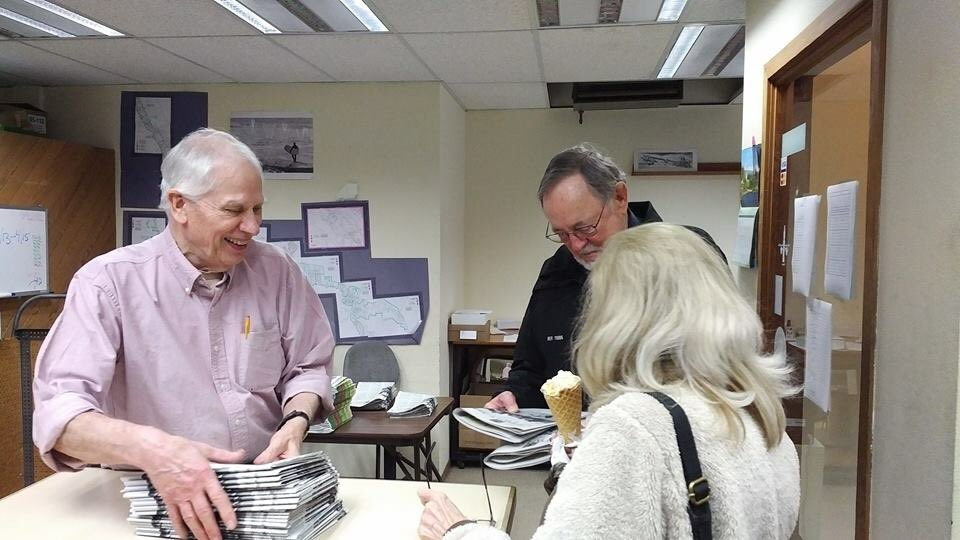
- Publisher and editor Thad Poulson with Don Young in 2016
- Type: Daily newspaper
- Format: Broadsheet
- Owner(s): Thad and Sandy Poulson, Verstovia Corp.
- Founder(s): Homer Graham; Jessie Heider
- Publisher: Thad and Sandy Poulson, Verstovia Corp.
- Editor: Thad and Sandy Poulson
- Founded: 1939
- Language: English
- Headquarters: 112 Barracks Street; Sitka, Alaska 99835; United States
- Website: sitkasentinel.com

The Sitka Sentinel is an independent, family-owned newspaper published on non-holiday weekdays in Sitka, Alaska, United States. The paper covers local, regional, national and international news, and includes a sports page and an end-of-week arts highlight. The paper features a news department of two reporters.

== History ==
In 1939, the Sitka Sentinel was founded by newly weds Homer Graham and Jessie Heider, two recent graduates of the University of Oregon. It was soon acquired by William L. Baker, who leased it to Oregon newsman Harold A. Veatch and his wife Ernestine.

Veatch increased print frequency from once to five times a week during World War II, although the page size was decreased due to a paper shortage. The frequency change was made permanent in 1950. Thad Poulson joined the paper's staff as assistant editor in January 1969.

Veatch eventually bought the Sentinel and leased it in February 1969 to Lew and Dorothy Williams, owners of the Ketchikan Daily News. The Williams also acquired the paper at some point and sold it in 1975 to Thad and his wife Sandy Poulson, who had managed and edited the paper for the past six years. At that time the Sentinel had a circulation of 2,000.
