= Petroleum News =

- Type: Weekly newspaper
- Owner(s): Petroleum Newspapers of Alaska, LLC
- Founder(s): Kay Cashman
- Publisher: Kay Cashman
- Editor-in-chief: Kristen Nelson
- Headquarters: 5541 Old Seward, #3, Anchorage, Alaska
- Website: petroleumnews.com

The Petroleum News is a weekly newspaper based in Anchorage, Alaska. Prior to April 6, 2003, Petroleum News was known as Petroleum News Alaska. The name change came as a result of the gradual addition of more Canadian and Continental U.S. petroleum news to the weekly paper, and especially coverage of the proposed Mackenzie Valley Pipeline. The Petroleum News is the only standalone oil and gas publication in Alaska.

== History ==
In December 1995, the editorial and sales staff at the Alaska Oil & Gas Reporter (owned by the Alaska Journal of Commerce) quit to found Petroleum News Alaska. As of 1998, Kay Cashman was the editor-in-chief of the publication. As of 1999, Alaska Business and Industry Newspapers was the parent company of Petroleum News Alaska, with the parent company also publishing Mining News Alaska and Business News Alaska.

In May 2000, Petroleum News Alaska was sold to Dan Wilcox. Kay Cashman remained on as editor-in-chief. In June 2000, Cashman became publisher of the Kodiak Daily Mirror and associate editor of Petroleum News Alaska. In October 2001, Petroleum News Alaska switched from being a monthly publication to being a weekly publication.

In April 2003, the publication changed its name from Petroleum News Alaska to Petroleum News. This reflected a change in focus from just news on the Alaska oil and gas industry to news on the North American oil and gas industry more broadly.

In October 2008, Petroleum News published Sarah Takes on Big Oil, a book about Sarah Palin (former governor of Alaska) and Big Oil (specifically BP, ConocoPhillips, and ExxonMobil). As of October 2008, Cashman was the publisher and executive editor of Petroleum News.
