= Mo Mountain Mutts =

American company)

- Company type: Dog walking
- Founded: 2021 (5 years ago)
- Headquarters: Skagway, Alaska, United States

Mo Mountain Mutts is an American dog-walking and dog-training company based in Skagway, Alaska. It came to public attention in 2023, when a video of its dog bus went viral. The business is run by Mo and Lee Thompson, natives of Michigan who moved to Alaska in 2014. They went full-time in August 2021.

The Thompsons provide walks for off-leash dogs up to five times a day, in groups of around twelve. The dogs are picked up on a fourteen-passenger minibus before they are taken for their walk, often along the Skagway River. The dogs board the bus, often by themselves, then jump onto their designated seat. Senior dogs tend to be seated closer to the front of the bus, while younger ones are located further back.

The Thompsons' video, uploaded to TikTok, has been viewed over fifty million times, as of January 2023.
