= Spirit of Alaska Credit Union =

Credit union based in Fairbanks, Alaska

- Company type: Credit union
- Industry: Financial services
- Founded: 1960
- Headquarters: Fairbanks, Alaska; United States
- Key people: Anthony Rizk, President; Margaret Hernandez, Chairman
- Products: Savings; checking; consumer loans; mortgages; credit cards
- Total assets: US$195M (2024)
- Website: www.spiritofak.com

Spirit of Alaska Federal Credit Union (dba Spirit of Alaska Credit Union) is the largest National Credit Union Administration insured credit union based in Fairbanks, Alaska. There are three branches with ATMs in the Fairbanks area, and an additional branch in North Pole. Spirit of Alaska has around ten thousand members, and is the only credit union headquartered in the Fairbanks metropolitan area. Any person who lives, works, or worships in the Fairbanks North Star Borough is eligible to join the credit union.

== History ==
Spirit of Alaska was originally a small credit union located in the Viking Room of Constitution Hall, University of Alaska Fairbanks. The credit union was started with $32 in a metal cash box and was first named "Greater Fairbanks Teachers’ Credit Union". It was dedicated to non-profit operations for the service and benefit of its member teachers. As the membership grew and expanded to include members north of the Alaska Range, the name was changed in 1975 to "Northern Schools Federal Credit Union". The name was again changed in 2007 to "Spirit of Alaska Federal Credit Union" to reflect the continued expansion of the field of membership and expansive growth of Spirit of Alaska.

Spirit of Alaska opened their third branch at the corner of Hunter and Johansen in north Fairbanks June 4, 2011.

In 2025, a company rebranding changed the credit union's trade name to Spirit of Alaska Credit Union, reflecting the company's local dedication while still being federally insured.

A fourth branch was added in June 2025 inside the Three Bears Alaska grocery and retail store in North Pole, at the corner of Buzby Drive and the Richardson Highway.
