= Polar Express (cable system) =

Proposed submarine communications cable in northern Russia

"Polar Express" is a proposed Arctic 12,650 km long submarine communication cable connecting Murmansk and Vladivostok by traversing the Northern Sea Route with planned total capacity from 52 to 104 Tbit/s. The cable was proposed on October 26, 2020, by decree of the President of Russia and the project realization was started on November 18, 2020, by Morsvyazsputnik, a subsidiary of Federal Agency for Maritime and River Transportation of Russian Ministry of Transport.

== History ==
The cable will connect Murmansk and Vladivostok along the shortest route between Europe and Asia, which will create an alternative to satellite communications in northern latitudes. This will help meet the growing needs of online trading, cloud technologies and processing of large volumes of data, providing a reliable and affordable Internet connection.

It was planned to begin laying the cable from two opposite ends simultaneously, with the goal of completing the construction by 2026. The planned cost of the project is 65 billion rubles.

A plant was built in Murmansk for the production of submarine communication cable.

On October 27, 2022, the first section of the fiber-optic communication line was completed, the cable was installed in Amderma.

In December 2022, Rostelecom built for its own purposes the "Anadyr – Petropavlovsk-Kamchatsky" fiber-optic line, thus duplicating the "Polar Express" network link planned for 2026. Duplicating submarine communication cables may be useful due to the potential accidental damage by ships.

On November 1, 2023, the concept of creating a trans-Arctic telecom operator was developed. However, the proposed concept was later asked to be clarified.

In 2023, a coastal station was built in Dikson (Krasnoyarsk Krai), work is underway on the section from Amderma to Dikson.

Other fiber-optic communication projects, such as "Synergy of Arctic", are planning to connect to the "Polar Express".

On November 25, 2023, the project layout was presented at VDNKh as part of the exhibition "Russia in Motion".

ITMO has organized a pilot production line for domestic optical amplifiers (repeaters) for submarine communication cables.

In Tiksi, in 2025, a fiber-optic connection will be provided to Arctictelecom from the coastal communication station, the construction of which under the "Polar Express" project should begin in 2024.

== Specifications ==
The system uses a specialized submarine cable with 6 pairs of optical fibers and a conductive element to power optical amplifiers. These pairs of optical fibers have different purposes:

- two pairs are used for the main connection on the route "Murmansk (Teriberka) – Vladivostok", with a length of 12,650 km;
- two pairs are used to create four independent branches to intermediate objects at various points, such as Amderma, Dikson, Tiksi, Pevek, Anadyr, Petropavlovsk-Kamchatsky, Yuzhno-Sakhalinsk;
- two pairs are used to create a backup connection for future development of the entire network.

Total capacity planned from 52 to 104 Tbit/s.
