= Ketchikan Daily News =

Daily American newspaper

- Type: Daily newspaper
- Format: Broadsheet
- Owner(s): Pioneer Printing Co., Inc.
- Publisher: Tena Williams
- Founded: 1934
- Language: English
- Headquarters: 501 Dock Street; Ketchikan, Alaska 99901; United States
- Website: ketchikandailynews.com

The Ketchikan Daily News is the primary daily newspaper for Ketchikan, Alaska.

== History ==
In 1934, the paper was founded by the Alaska Trollers Association as The Alaska Fishing News. It was soon published by Sidney D. Charles. Critics called the paper the “Daily Fish Wrapper," but it expanded into a daily by the end of World War II. In 1947, Charles renamed his paper to the Ketchikan Daily News. The paper installed an Offset press in 1966. At that time Lew Williams, Jr. became managing editor.

Charles published the News until his death in 1969. Lew Williams, Jr. and his wife then managed the News and soon acquired the Daily Sitka Sentinel, which they published until 1975. The couple bought out Paul S. and Patricia Charles from the Daily News in 1976 to become the paper's sole owners. At that time the paper had a circulation of 4,000.

Williams, Jr. was well known in Alaska as an opinion columnist. Originally appearing mainly in the Anchorage Times, his columns were regularly published in many Alaskan newspapers up until his death in 2008. He was survived by his children including Lew Williams III, the mayor of Ketchikan from 1990 to 2018. Two years before his death, he co-authored a book titled "Bent Pins to Chains: Alaska and Its Newspapers." In 2020, Williams III died.

== Content ==
The Ketchikan Daily News is usually made up of one section including Local, Alaska, Opinion, Sports, Entertainment, Nation, and World pages in its Monday, Tuesday, Thursday and Friday editions. The Wednesday edition includes a "B" section usually titled "Education." The Weekend Edition covering Saturday and Sunday has a B section titled "Waterfront" along with Sunday Comics and a "Local Scene" supplement that contains book and movie reviews and occasionally an article on coming performances or art events.
