= Credit Union 1 (Alaska) =

Alaskan credit union

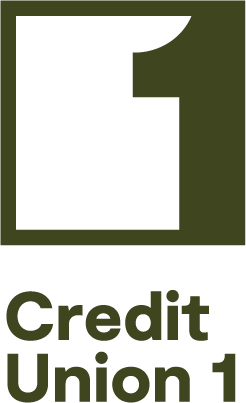
- Type: Credit Union
- Industry: Financial services
- Founded: 1952 (Anchorage Teachers Federal Credit Union)
- Headquarters: Anchorage, Alaska, U.S.
- Area served: Anchorage, Fairbanks, Eagle River, Kodiak, Ketchikan, Soldotna, Nome, Ketchikan, Wasilla, Homer, and Skagway
- Key people: Mark Burgess (President/CEO), Jennifer Bernard (Board Chair)
- Products: Savings; checking; consumer loans; mortgages; credit cards; online banking
- Net income: ▼US$11.241 Million (2022)
- Total assets: ▲US$1.48 Billion (2022)
- Number of employees: 415
- Website: cu1.org

Credit Union 1 is Alaska's only state-chartered credit union, and anyone who lives or works in Alaska is eligible to join. As of December 31, 2022, the credit union had $1.48 billion in assets, nearly 100,000 members and 12 branches throughout the state.

Based in Anchorage, Alaska, Credit Union 1 is the second largest credit union in its state and the only one that solely serves Alaskans. As of 2022, the credit union currently employs 415 Alaskans in communities ranging from Ketchikan, Alaska to Nome, Alaska.

Credit Union 1 is federally insured by the National Credit Union Administration (NCUA), up to $250,000 per account.

== History ==
Credit Union 1 was established as the Anchorage Teachers Federal Credit Union in 1952. Its original membership base was personnel and dependents of the Anchorage Independent School District. The credit union has since merged with other Alaskan credit unions, such as FedAlaska, Ward Cove, Frontier Alaskan and North Country Credit Union, to form Credit Union 1.

In 2010, the credit union opened a branch in the Mountain View neighborhood of Anchorage, which had not had a financial institution for over 20 years. The land for the new branch was purchased from the Anchorage Community Land Trust.

In 2016, Credit Union 1 was named to The Financial Brand’s “Top 100" list of credit unions using social media.

In 2022, the credit union was again recognized as one of the top 49 businesses in Alaska by Alaska Business Monthly

In 2022, Credit Union 1 was again named among the top three Best Places to Work (250+ employees) in Alaska by Alaska Business Monthly
