= Alerion Aviation =

Private jet flight

- Founded: 1993
- Operating bases: Long Beach Daugherty Field, California
- Fleet size: 14
- Headquarters: Long Beach, California

Alerion Aviation (previously JetFlite International) offers private jet charter and aircraft management services globally.

== History ==
JetFlite International (JFI) was originally known as Skookum Air, Inc. Skookum Air was created in Alaska in 1993 operating a single-engine, piston-powered Cessna 185. Back then, Skookum Air's primary mission was to fly fishermen, hunters, and supplies from Anchorage to remote Alaskan towns. Very soon after its founding, the company relocated to Long Beach Airport (LGB) in Long Beach, California, changed its name to Air Rutter International (ARI), and started to grow in the executive aircraft charter industry.

In just a few years, ARI built up and managed a fleet of eight Citation 500 series and 650 series jet aircraft. In 1998, ARI moved to John Wayne/Orange County Airport (SNA) in Irvine, California. During this period, ARI grew into an aircraft management company, operating heavy and midsize jets (including such models as G-II, G-III, and G-IV from Gulfstream, the Challenger 601 from Bombardier, and the Hawker 800/700 from Hawker Beechcraft). As its fleet expanded to include heavy jets, ARI obtained World Wide Operations Specifications and, thus, created a foundation for global expansion.

Under new ownership in 2005, ARI returned to Long Beach Airport and expanded significantly to specialize in heavy jet management and international charters. In addition, the company established an FBO and a fuel farm at Long Beach. In the spring of 2010 ARI changed its name to JetFlite International, LLC (JFI), established an operating base on the East Coast at Farmingdale Republic Airport (FRG), and added an aircraft largely dedicated to serving the Russian market. After a merger with ACP Jet in 2016 the company was renamed to Alerion Aviation.

JetFlite International has extended its services to include aircraft sales and acquisitions.
