= Kodiak Daily Mirror =

Daily American newspaper

- Type: Daily newspaper
- Format: Broadsheet
- Owner: Helen E. Snedden Foundation
- Founder: Gene Dawson
- Publisher: Kevin Bumgarner
- Founded: June 15, 1940
- Language: English
- Headquarters: 1419 Selig Street; Kodiak, AK 99615; United States
- Circulation: 1,081 (as of 2015)
- Sister newspapers: Fairbanks Daily News-Miner
- Website: kodiakdailymirror.com

The Kodiak Daily Mirror is the daily newspaper of Kodiak, Alaska.

== History ==
On June 14, 1940, Gene Dawson published the first edition of the Kodiak Mirror. The paper was acquired by William H. Lamme in December 1942, Melton L. Crawford in 1948, father-and-son James G. Bennett and Patrick Bennet in 1954, Sig J. Digree in 1955, Wayne and Nancy Kotula in 1964, Jack Clark, David and Nancy Staunchfield in 1975, and Duane and Nancy Freeman in 1982.

The Freemans sold the Mirror to the owners of the Fairbanks Daily News-Miner in 1998. At that time the paper had a circulation of 3,000. Asa Cole was then named publisher. In 2016, the News-Miner and the Mirror were purchased by the nonprofit Helen E. Snedden Foundation.
