= First National Bank Alaska =

Bank in Alaska

- Type: Public company
- Traded as: OTCQX: FBAK
- Industry: Financial services
- Founded: 1922
- Headquarters: Anchorage, Alaska; United States
- Area served: State of Alaska
- Key people: Betsy Lawer, CEO/Chair
- Products: Savings, checking, personal and commercial loans, online banking, mortgages, credit cards, investment management
- Net income: ▲US$55.6 Million (2019)
- Total assets: ▲US$3.81 Billion (2019)
- Total equity: ▲US$547.7 Million (2019)
- Number of employees: 611 (2024)
- Website: fnbalaska.com

First National Bank Alaska is an American bank founded in 1922 by Winfield Ervin Sr., as The First National Bank of Anchorage. The first branch stood on the corner of 4th and G Streets in Anchorage, Alaska.

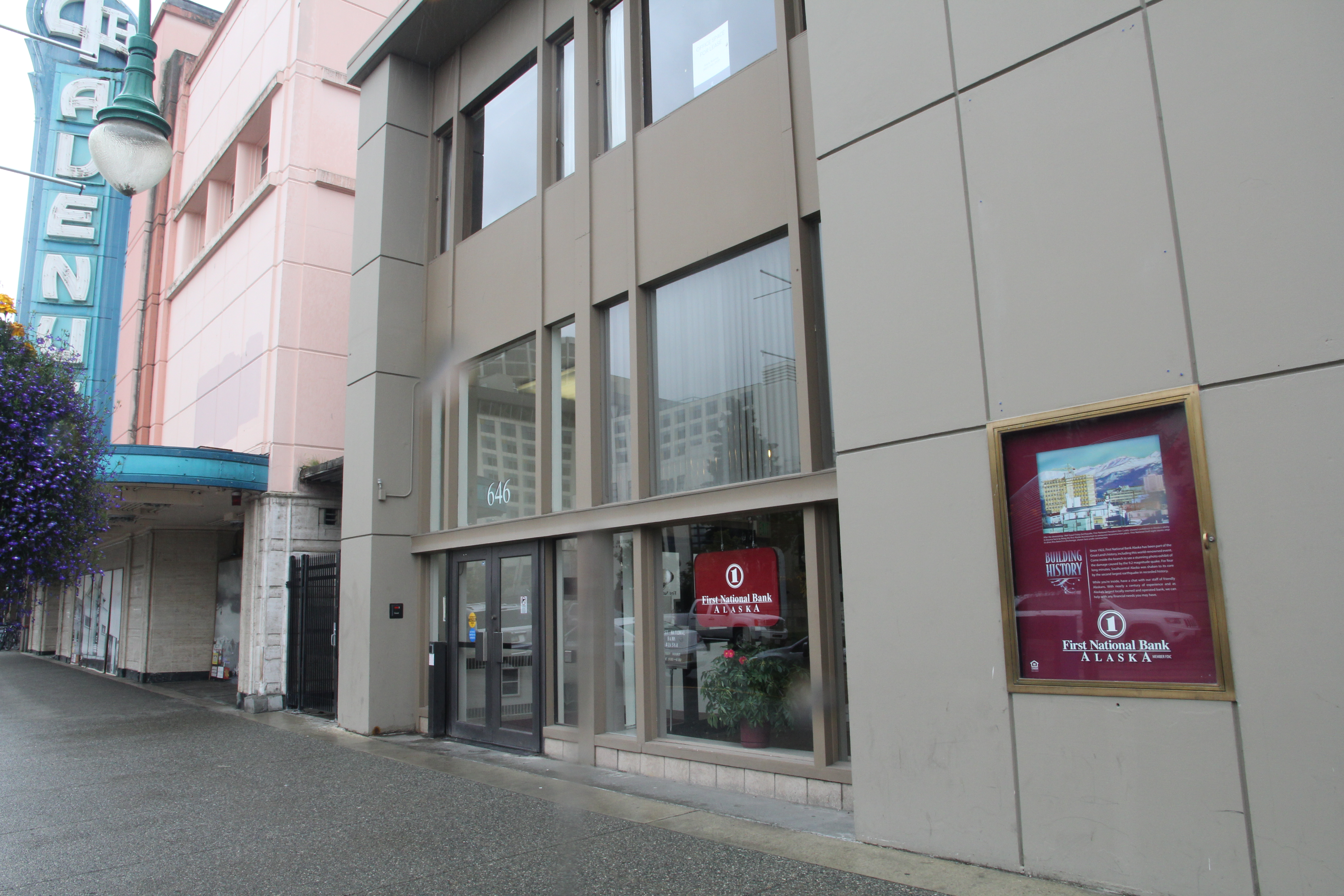
First National Bank Alaska's original location in downtown Anchorage, Alaska, in 2016.

== History ==
The bank was founded in 1922 by candy maker Winfield Ervin Sr. at the corner of 4th and G Streets in Anchorage, Alaska. The bank still operates a branch at this location today. Known at the time as The First National Bank of Anchorage, the business benefited from the Alaska Railroad construction boom of the early 1920s.

In 1941, the bank was purchased by Warren N. Cuddy, who took over as president. Cuddy first came to Alaska in 1914, settling in Valdez and working as a grocery clerk in the Valdez Mercantile Company. During this time he began to study law and met his future wife, Lucy Hon. They moved to Anchorage in 1933, where Cuddy continued his legal work and took over the law practice of J.S. Truitt. Cuddy became involved with the Alaska Rural Rehabilitation Corporation (ARRC), which was established in 1935, and served on the board of directors. The ARRC was the main administrative agency of the Matanuska Colony, a New Deal experiment that brought two hundred farming families into the Matanuska Valley. This resettlement of families also brought with it $200 million into southcentral Alaska between 1935 and 1941 at the height of the Great Depression. It was during this time that Cuddy became interested in the struggling bank, and began his long career in the banking business of Alaska. Cuddy secured the bank's membership in the Federal Deposit Insurance Corporation (FDIC), which enabled it to grow much faster during the wartime since federal agencies and the military did business only with government-insured banks. Cuddy died in 1951, and his son, D.H. Cuddy, succeeded as president, a position he retained for 63 years until his passing in 2015 at the age of 94. Cuddy's daughter, Betsy Lawer, succeeded as first as Chair and President, now Chair and CEO, making the bank continually operated by the Cuddy family for more than 75 years. In 1960, First National opened Alaska's first drive-through bank. In September 2001, the bank's name was changed to First National Bank Alaska. The similarly named National Bank of Alaska had been absorbed into Wells Fargo in 2000.

The bank has consistently ranked among the nation's top performing banks, in 1989 being listed among the nation's top 10 performing banks by Veribanc, meeting the "highest standards in the industry." In May 2007, Bauer Financial Reports gave First National a "five-star" rating, the highest such rating they offer. It is the 73 consecutive quarter First National has earned the five-star rating, the longest such streak of any Alaska bank. Because First National has maintained this rating in each quarter for at least 10 years, it also earned Bauer's distinction of an "Exceptional Performance Bank."

Most recently, First National has been recognized two years in a row, by the readers of Alaska Business Magazine, as the "Best Place to Work in Alaska;" MSN also listed the bank in early 2018 as the "Most Admired Company in Alaska."

First National reported more than $3.61 billion in assets in its 2016 Annual Highlights. In April 2006, the bank opened its 29th branch in Glennallen. The bank currently operates 28 branches in 18 Alaska cities.

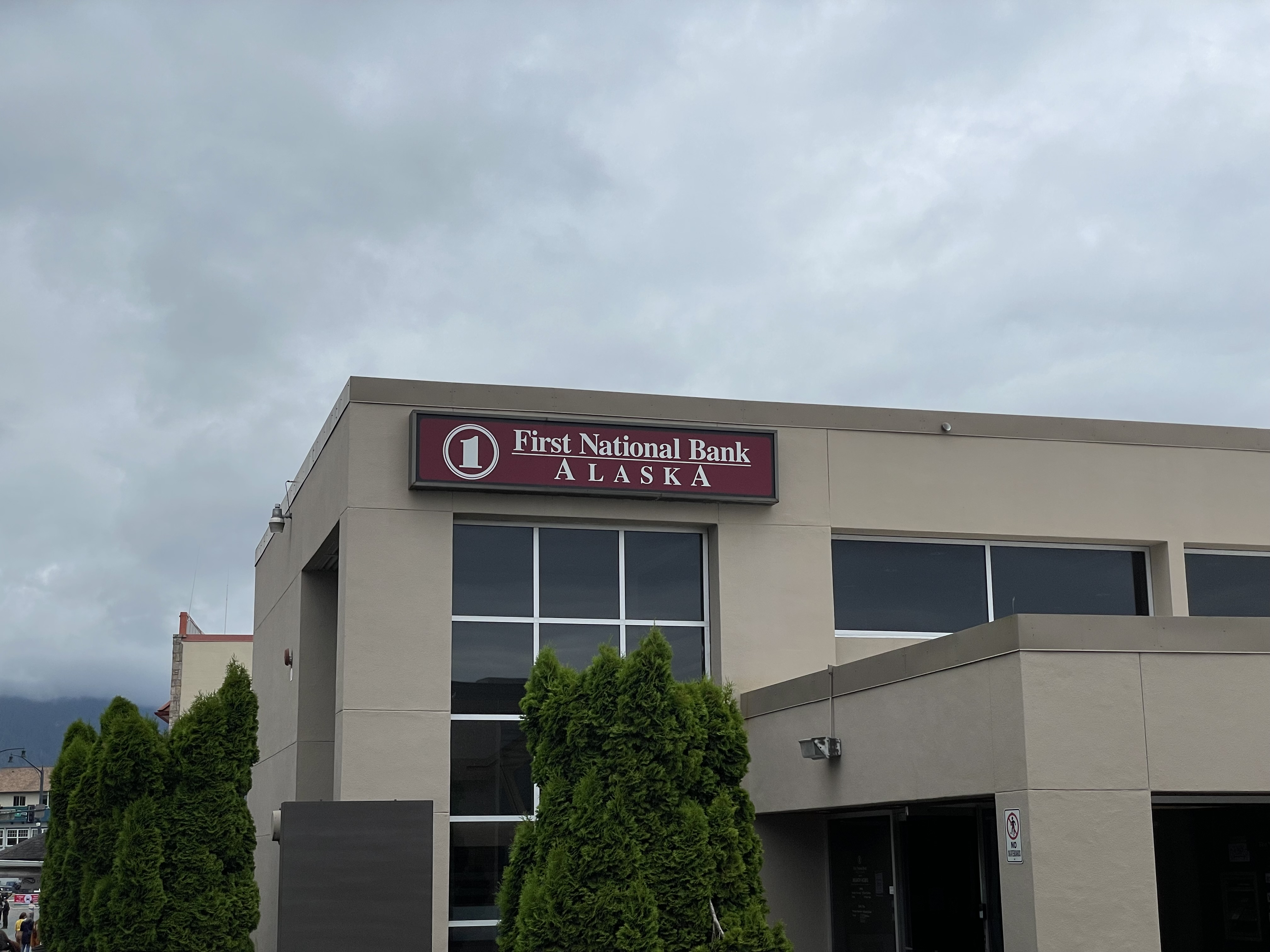
First National Bank Alaska branch in Sitka, Alaska.

First National Bank Alaska stock currently trades as FBAK on the OTC Markets stock exchange. The company has consistently paid quarterly dividends since November 2003. FBAK increased its quarterly dividend to $20 in May 2016, citing a strong capital account and a unique position to operate competitively versus national chains. As of October 1st, 2021, the stock was trading at $233.74 per share at a P/E ratio of 13.1 and with a dividend yield of 5.48%.

== Key dates ==
- 1922: Candymaker Winfield Ervin founds First National at the corner of 4th and G streets, in Anchorage. The bank has 500 shares of stock, a single employee, and a vault filled with gold nuggets and untanned animal pelts.
- 1923: As the Alaska Railroad begins operation, contractors and employees turn to the bank for safety and security.
- 1943: First National supplies payroll to troops stationed in Alaska.
- 1959: Alaska finally achieves statehood, and the bank opens its Northern Lights Branch, the first Alaska bank branch located in a major shopping center. The following year First National would open Alaska's first drive-through bank and become the first Alaska bank to computerize its operations.
- 1964 After the catastrophic Good Friday earthquake, First National puts additional funds into reconstruction of quake areas across the state. Bank President D.H. Cuddy announces new building project to demonstrate confidence in Alaska.
- 1967: First National serves as a catalyst for reconstruction following the Fairbanks flood of 1967.
- 1989-1999: While the mid-80s recession forces banks and businesses across the state to close, First National, ranked among the nation's top 10 performing banks, expands. Two new buildings are constructed in Anchorage: the new Corporate Headquarters and the Service Center. The existing Data Center is also extensively remodeled.
- 2000-2010: First National Bank Alaska invests in technology, offering online banking services for consumers and businesses. The bank continues to grow, adding branches in Glennallen and Healy and a third in Fairbanks, the Johansen Branch. A new building for the Dimond Branch in South Anchorage is completed.
- 2010 - current: First National Bank Alaska builds and opens a new—additional—branch building in the Anchorage U-Med District, named the U-Med Branch. The bank also builds and opens the new Juneau Regional Branch in that southeast Alaska hub; and builds and opens a brand new building on Joint Base Elemendorf and Richardson (JBER) in which to relocate the Elmendorf Branch, re-named the North Star Branch.
