= Fairbanks Daily News-Miner =

Daily newspaper in Fairbanks, Alaska

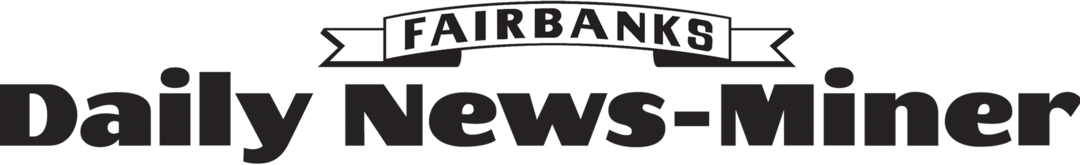

- The front page of the October 24, 2020, edition of the newspaper.
- Type: Daily newspaper
- Format: Broadsheet
- Owner: Helen E. Snedden Foundation
- Publisher: Virginia Farmier
- Managing editor: Gary Black
- Staff writers: 6
- Founded: 1903
- Language: English
- Headquarters: 200 North Cushman Street; Fairbanks, Alaska 99701; United States
- Circulation: 5,500 Daily; 6,500 Sunday
- Sister newspapers: Kodiak Daily Mirror
- ISSN: 8750-5495
- Website: newsminer.com

The Fairbanks Daily News-Miner is a morning daily newspaper serving the city of Fairbanks, Alaska, the Fairbanks North Star Borough, the Denali Borough, and the Yukon-Koyukuk Census Area in the U.S. state of Alaska. Because Fairbanks is located at a latitude of 64.838 degrees north, the News-Miner offices are located farther north than those of any other daily newspaper in North America. The paper is the oldest continuously operating daily in Alaska, and by circulation it is the second-largest daily in the state. It was purchased by the Helen E. Snedden Foundation in 2016. The Snedden family were longtime owners of the News-Miner, selling it to a family trust for Dean Singleton and Richard Scudder, founders of the Media News Group in 1992.

The News-Miner was founded as the Weekly Fairbanks News in 1903 by George M. Hill and assumed the News-Miner name in 1909, under editor William Fentress Thompson, when Zachary Hickman sold his newspaper, The Miner News, to the Fairbanks News. Thompson guided the paper through tough economic times as the gold near Fairbanks was mined out. During this period, the News-Miner absorbed Fairbanks' other newspapers and became the sole publication in Fairbanks. During the 1920s, the News-Miner experimented with aerial delivery to remote mining camps, becoming one of the first newspapers in the world to make regular deliveries by aircraft. After Thompson's death in 1926, former Fairbanks mayor Alfeld Hjalmar Nordale became the paper's editor.

In 1929, the News-Miner was purchased by Alaska industrialist Austin E. Lathrop, who operated it under a series of editors until 1950. In that year, the paper was purchased by Charles Willis Snedden, who proceeded on a course of modernization. Under Snedden's leadership, the News-Miner became one of the first papers in Alaska to print in color and survived a fire and the biggest flood in Fairbanks history.

The News-Miner has employed several notable Alaskans, including Sen. Bob Bartlett. Its mascot, Sourdough Jack, has been featured on the cover of every daily paper since 1952. The News-Miner has received numerous awards and recognitions during its history, particularly from the Alaska Press Club, which recognizes achievements by Alaska newspapers on an annual basis.

== Circulation and coverage ==
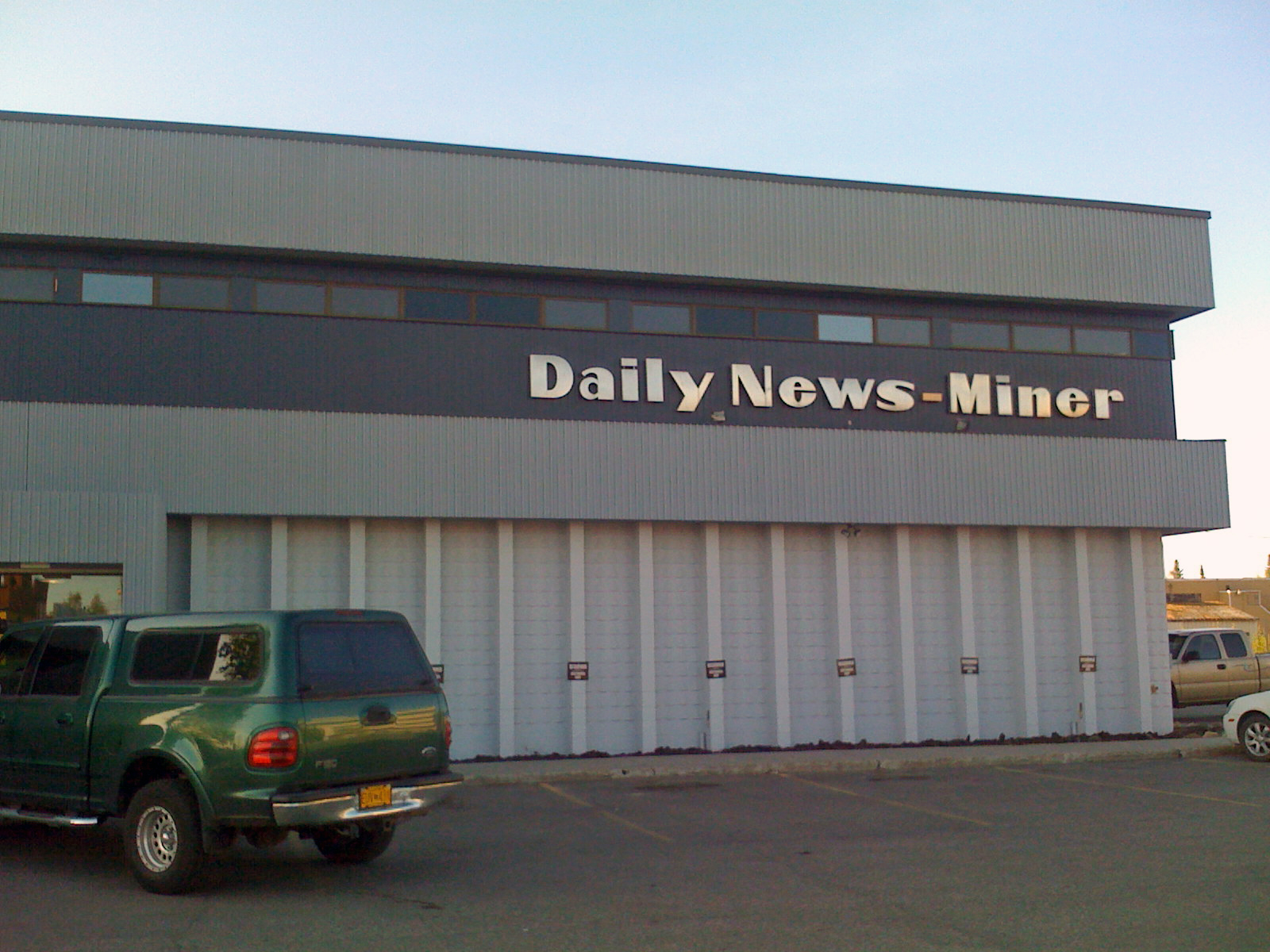
The side of the newspaper's headquarters, also known as the Aurora Building, in May 2009

The Fairbanks Daily News-Miner in 2009 had a daily circulation of between 9,000 and 12,500 copies (sources vary), and a Sunday circulation of about 12,000. Overall readership statistics are somewhat higher. The News-Miner operates a web site, Newsminer.com, which recorded roughly 250,000 unique visitors per year in 2009, according to Alexa.

The News-Miner's circulation area encompasses about 179,287 square miles (464,351 km^{2}) in central and northern Alaska. The circulation area includes the Fairbanks North Star Borough, the Yukon-Koyukuk Census Area, the northern portion of the Denali Borough, and portions of the Southeast Fairbanks Census Area. Major settlements in the circulation area include the city of Fairbanks and the towns of North Pole, Delta Junction, Healy, Fort Yukon, and Tok. There are no other daily newspapers in the News-Miner's circulation area, but Fairbanks and southern portions of the Denali Borough are secondary circulation areas for the Anchorage Daily News, a daily newspaper based 360 miles (579 km) south, in Anchorage.

The paper's coverage centers on local news with moderate reporting on state issues that affect Fairbanks and the surrounding area. Local sports, particularly the Alaska Goldpanners (charter members of the (Alaska Baseball League), Fairbanks Ice Dogs (North American Hockey League), and the various sports teams of the University of Alaska Fairbanks are covered regularly by the newspaper. The News-Miner produces several specialty publications in addition to the regular paper. Two publications, Latitude 65, a weekly arts supplement released on Thursday; and Sundays, a feature reporting section published on Sundays, also are produced by newspaper staff. Several annual publications — a visitors' guide, winter survival guide, and others — also are released by the newspaper on a regular basis.

== Early years ==
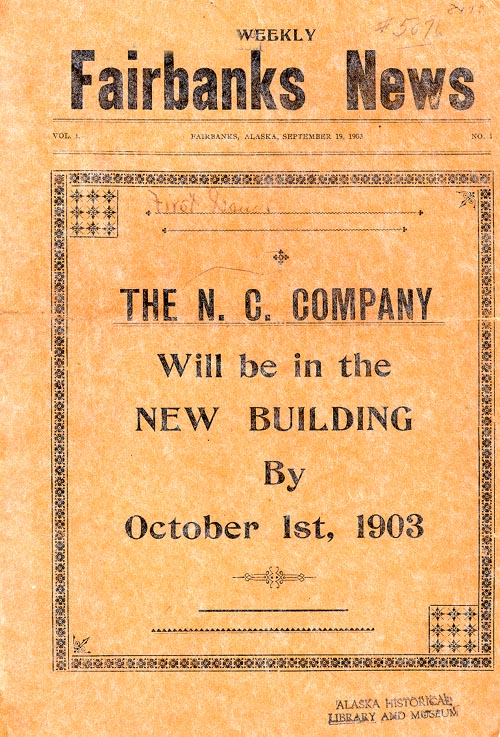
The first issue of the Weekly Fairbanks News was published on September 19, 1903.

=== Foundation ===
In 1901, trader Ebenezer Barnette sailed up Alaska's Tanana River in hopes of establishing a trading post on the trail connecting the coastal town of Valdez with the gold-mining community of Eagle. Due to low water, however, the steamboat Barnette chartered was unable to continue up the river. Discouraged, Barnette deposited his cache of goods on a riverbank of the Chena River and sailed downstream with the intent of making another attempt to sail up the river during the following year. In 1902, miner Felix Pedro struck gold at a spot about 15 miles (24 km) north of the spot where Barnette had left his supplies. Seeing an opportunity, Barnette decided to establish a trading post at the spot. Other miners and suppliers arrived, attracted by the gold, and Barnette named the settlement "Fairbanks", after Indiana senator and later Vice President of the United States Charles W. Fairbanks.

Through the fall and winter of 1902, word of the gold strike and the new settlement spread throughout Alaska and the Yukon. Printer George M. Hill, who had been working in Dawson City, packed up his small press and traveled to Fairbanks in early 1903. On September 19, 1903, he printed the first newspaper in the new settlement: Volume I, Issue I of the Weekly Fairbanks News. Little is known about Hill's operation, but he likely used either a Washington Hand Press or an "Army" press — both were small machines designed for transport on a single packhorse or pack mule. Single copies of the first editions of the paper were $0.25 each, or $10 for a year's subscription. The paper was 10 pages and had multiple advertisements, including one proclaiming that an election would be held on November 10 of that year for the purpose of incorporating the town. On the front page was a statement of policy:

The News is intended to cover an unoccupied field in the rich interior of this truly wonderful country, and its career is entented (sic) upon with a realizing sense of the grave responsibility which is attached to such a task.

— Weekly Fairbanks News, Volume I, Issue I. Sept. 19, 1903, p. 1.

=== Newspaper wars ===
In May 1904, Hill sold the Weekly Fairbanks News to R. J. McChesney, who invested in a Linotype machine and a larger press. These improvements and the growing population of Fairbanks — by 1905, it had 2,500 residents — allowed the Weekly Fairbanks News to expand to semi-weekly, then daily publication, in the process becoming the Fairbanks Daily News on July 1, 1905. On September 3, the News had its first competition when the Fairbanks Sunday Times began publishing on the sole day that the News did not. Other papers soon arrived in the area. In 1906, the Valdez News reported, "With the newspaper plans already in Fairbanks and with those which are being shipped there this year, the Tanana metropolis will be well supplied. There are no less than five of them all told ..." In May 1906, McChesney sold the Daily News to Fairbanks' founder, Ebenezer Barnette. Later that month, an enormous fire destroyed the Daily News press and much of Fairbanks.

Rather than wait for replacement equipment, Barnette purchased the press of a newly arrived editor, William Fentress Thompson, who had intended to set up his own newspaper. As part of the purchasing deal in August 1906, Thompson was allowed to publish an evening paper—the Tanana Daily Miner—while the Fairbanks Daily News was published in the morning. The deal lasted only through September, as Thompson and Barnette conflicted on a personal level. The Tanana Miner was reduced to a weekly newspaper, then Thompson was deposed as editor of the Fairbanks News in June 1907 and took the Tanana Miner to the settlement of Chena, outside Fairbanks. Barnette, meanwhile, became embroiled in a series of legal troubles. He faced opposition from the owner of the Fairbanks Times, A.L. Anderson, who had fought Barnette about several gold claims near Fairbanks and purchased the Times to compete against Barnette.

In 1907, Barnette was accused of embezzling money from the Fairbanks bank he operated, and he was sued by the man who had funded the venture that led to the founding of Fairbanks. During the lawsuit, it was revealed that Barnette had been convicted of larceny in Oregon. As his legal bills added up, Barnette decided to lease the Fairbanks Daily News to a group of local businessmen. On June 15, 1908, Barnette ended the lease agreement by selling the newspaper to J. Harmon Caskey and Henry Roden. That same year, the campaign to elect Alaska's first delegate to Congress was under way, and one of the candidates, Jack Corson, purchased one-third of the newspaper. Corson's campaign manager promptly was named the editor of the Daily News, and the paper switched to actively supporting Corson's candidacy.

During this time, William Thompson — best known as W.F. Thompson — began gathering investors to purchase the Fairbanks Daily News. After Corson's candidacy failed and Thompson amassed $15,000 from investors, he purchased the Daily News in March 1909. On March 18, 1909, the Daily News published its last issue. Four days later, it reopened under the name Fairbanks Daily News-Miner, an amalgam of the names of the Daily News and Thompson's previous operation, the Tanana Miner. He chose the name over his first idea, the Daily Alaska Miner.

== Territorial days ==
=== Consolidation ===
When Thompson assumed majority ownership of the renamed Fairbanks Daily News-Miner in early 1909, it was one of three daily newspapers in Fairbanks. The other two were the Fairbanks Times and the Tanana Daily Tribune. Competition among the three newspapers was intense, and they often clashed about issues such as city council meetings, a permanent bridge over the Chena River, and the mineral prospects of the town of Iditarod, where gold had just been discovered. The intense rivalries were driven by the declining economic situation in Fairbanks, as the initial gold findings that inspired the Fairbanks Gold Rush began to wane.

From the time Thompson took control until shortly after the Second World War, the News-Miner lacked a dedicated connection to the Associated Press. In the early years of the Thompson administration, he had a dedicated correspondent in Seattle whose job was to read the early editions of the Seattle newspapers, then hurry to the telegraph office and summarize what he had read to Thompson on the other end of the telegraph cable. This system later was replaced by a dedicated contract with the Alaska Communications System, but that contract limited the News-Miner to no more than 9,000 words per day of messages.

On January 10, 1910, the Tanana Tribune was absorbed by the News-Miner. The owners of the Tribune received shares in the News-Miner (which were later bought back by Thompson), and one of the Tribune's owners received its printing plant, which was moved to Tacoma, Washington. In 1911, Thompson feared the declining state of the Fairbanks economy and decided to leave Alaska. He sold his shares in the company, but returned after several months' absence and demanded the shares back. Los Bernard, who briefly served as the paper's publisher, returned the shares to Thompson, who resumed his role as publisher and editor. Thompson's return coincided with a series of small gold discoveries at Livengood and Shushanna that boosted the Fairbanks economy, as gold-seekers bought supplies in the town.

Thompson still wished to leave Alaska, however, and in 1915, he sold a majority share of News-Miner stock on option to O.P. Gaustad, a Republican Party booster. Scandal erupted when it was revealed that Gaustad was merely a stand-in for James Wickersham, who was Alaska's delegate to Congress. Partially because of the scandal, Gaustad was unable to sell the shares he held an option for, and Thompson returned to Alaska in spring 1916 to reassume his role as publisher. Later that year, Republican interests took over the Fairbanks Times, which had leaned toward the Democratic Party. The new owners of the Times were unable to come up with financing for new equipment, however, and the Times went out of business in October 1916.

Following the discontinuation of the Times, the Alaska Weekly Citizen shifted to a daily publication schedule. This lasted until 1920, when a fire destroyed the Citizen's printing plant. The News-Miner printed the two papers in conjunction for a time — both mastheads appeared on the same paper — but after the Citizen was unable to obtain loans to rebuild, the News-Miner assumed its subscription list and business contracts, and it became the sole daily newspaper in Fairbanks.

=== Tough times ===
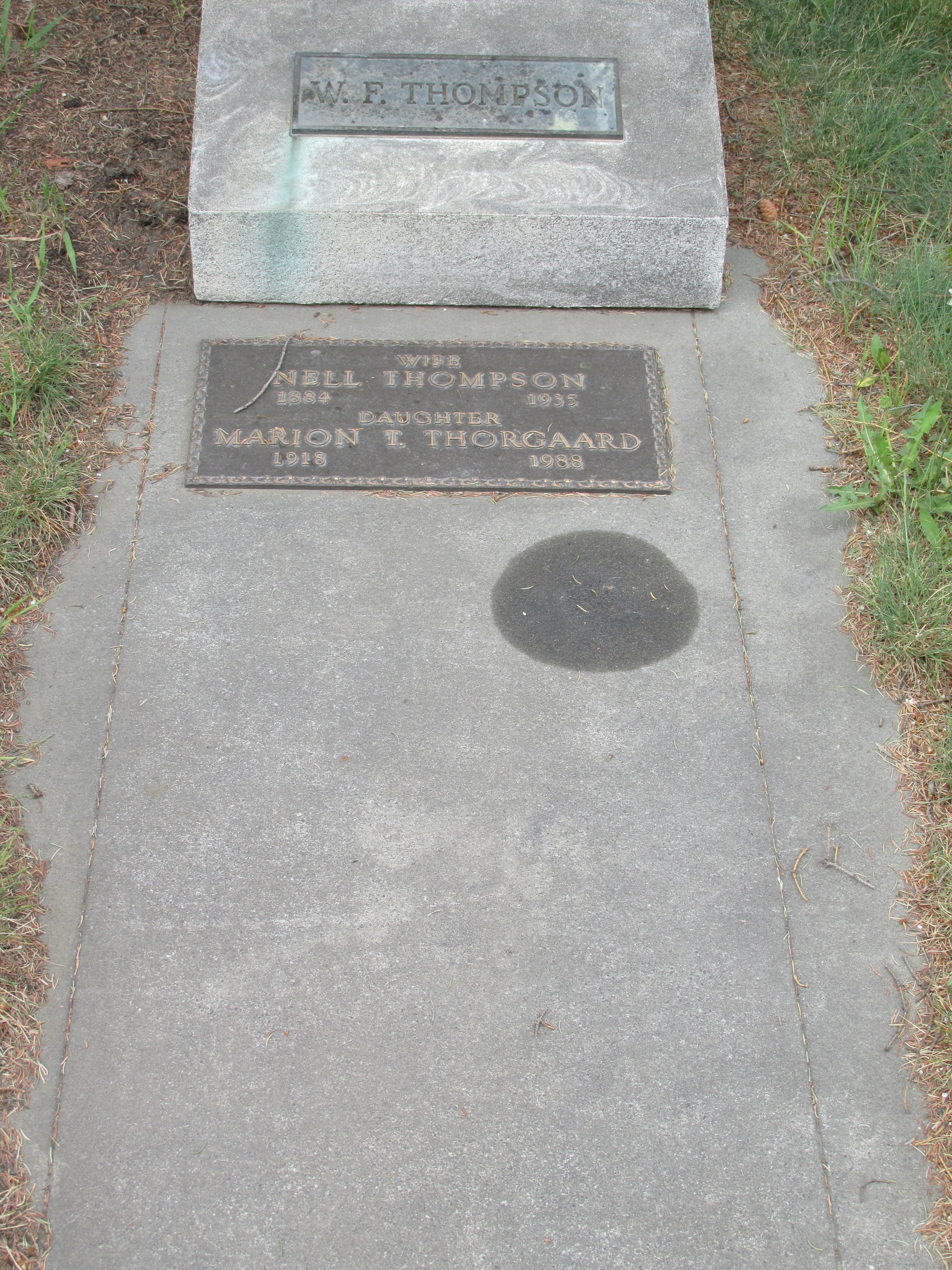
Grave of William Fentress Thompson, his wife and their daughter at Clay Street Cemetery, photographed in May 2014

In May 1920, the Spanish flu reached Fairbanks and infected most of the newspaper staff. "We had to keep writing of flu and the typesetters kept setting flu stories until they began to imagine they had the flu and went—one, two, three—just like that," said Thompson in a story on the outbreak. Two years later, Thompson and the News-Miner strongly protested the city's order to evict the prostitutes living in a regulated district within Fairbanks. On September 24, 1922, Thompson reported that the News-Miner's press had been sabotaged, oil had been mixed with the paper's printing ink, and a fire had been set in its office, presumably as a result of the paper's stance against eviction.

The decline of Fairbanks' economy was partially offset by the construction of the Alaska Railroad, and the arrival of President Warren G. Harding to dedicate the railroad in 1923. Harding visited the News-Miner offices and set a small bit of type for a special edition commemorating the visit. Less than one month later, however, Harding died on his return from Alaska. Harding's visit coincided with the first commercial airplane flight in the state of Alaska on July 19. By the next year, copies of the News-Miner were delivered regularly by aircraft to remote mining camps and roadhouses. In the process, the News-Miner became the first newspaper to regularly deliver via aircraft.

Three years after Harding's death, William Thompson died on January 4, 1926. He was replaced by assistant editor Alfeld Hjalmar Nordale, who had been mayor of Fairbanks. At the time, the newspaper was in dire straits. Circulation had declined with the falling Fairbanks population, and reached a low of about 500 in 1925, less than half what it was in 1909. The paper still relied on an old flatbed press, which dated from the turn of the century. The newspaper offices were aging, and there was little money to upgrade. Nordale was further stressed by a conflict between him and Thompson's widow, who was the majority shareholder. The conflict arose when two competing candidates for political office attempted to buy the paper's editorial support with pledges of money. When Mrs. Thompson accepted one of the offers, Nordale asked that his name be removed from the newspaper. During the months leading up to the election, the News-Miner produced dozens of editorials and reproduced the speeches of the candidate. After the candidate lost, however, he failed to follow through on his promises of payment. Nordale was reinstated as editor on February 1, 1927, vindicated by the candidate's indictment on four counts of violating the federal Corrupt Practices Act.

=== Bob Bartlett ===
In 1927, Nordale hired a recent University of Alaska Fairbanks graduate named Bob Bartlett. Bartlett had worked for the paper during school vacations, but he made journalism a full-time job following graduation. For four years, Bartlett was the only reporter (other than the editor) who regularly wrote local stories. In late 1930, Bartlett was made the paper's assistant editor in lieu of a raise that the paper couldn't afford to pay. Bartlett remained the paper's assistant editor until 1933, when he became the secretary to Anthony Dimond, Alaska's delegate to the U.S. Congress. Bartlett became the delegate to Congress in 1945, and in 1958, when Alaska hosted its first election for state office, Bartlett was elected one of its first two U.S. senators.

=== Lathrop era ===
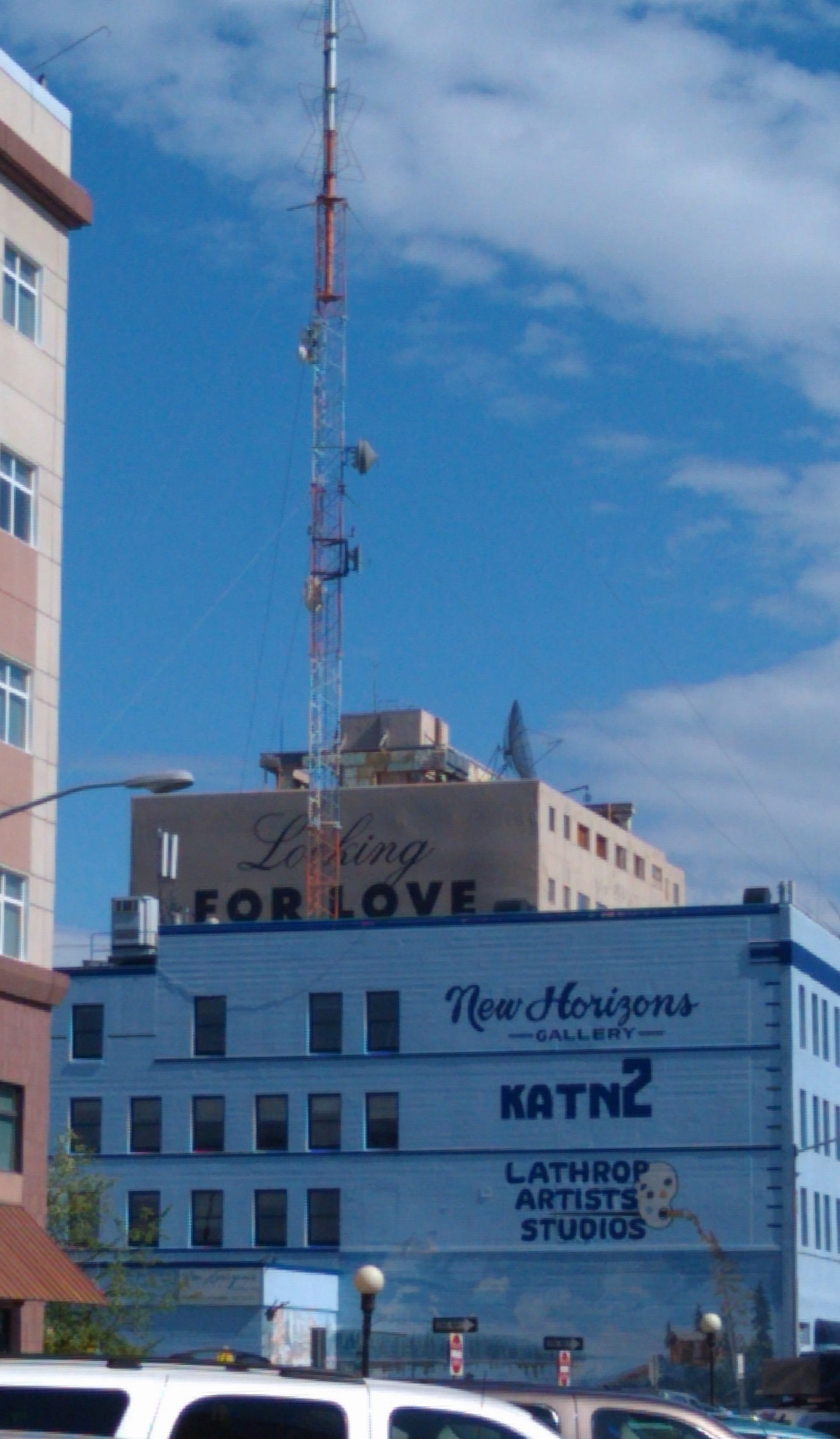
The Lathrop Building (shown in May 2011) was built in 1936 on Second Avenue in downtown Fairbanks. The building housed a number of Lathrop enterprises during the middle 20th century, including the newspaper.

In October 1928, the News-Miner cut costs by moving to a new office. This allowed the purchase of a new Linotype machine, and further upgrades were promised when on November 8, 1929, the News-Miner was purchased by Austin E. Lathrop, an Alaska industrialist. Though Lathrop promised to inject money into the News-Miner, his strong Republican leanings opposed those of Nordale, a confirmed Democrat. Nordale resigned in April 1930 and was replaced by Bernard Stone. Stone and Lathrop turned the News-Miner profitable before Stone was replaced by Charles R. Settlemier in 1936. In 1935, the News-Miner purchased two cylinder presses to replace the old flatbed press still in use. Owing to shipping difficulties, however, the presses and the new crew needed to operate them did not arrive until 1936. By that time, the News-Miner was preparing to move into the new Lathrop Building, built by and named after the newspaper's owner.

As the Great Depression hit the United States, Fairbanks bucked the poor economic trend. Thanks to the Alaska Railroad, large gold dredges could be brought in, and these returned the area's gold mines to profitability. In 1938, Lathrop took advantage of the good economic situation by reviving the Alaska Miner as a weekly supplement to the News-Miner. The Miner covered happenings in the gold-mining camps outside Fairbanks and was focused on areas outside the city. In 1939, Fairbanks radio station KFAR was founded, and it shared the Lathrop building with the News-Miner, which occupied the bottom floors of the building.

In January 1941, a disagreement between Settlemier, one of his reporters, and the editor of the Alaska Miner resulted in several changes to the News-Miner. Settlemier was replaced as editor by the reporter, David B. Tewkesbury, and the Alaska Miner was discontinued. Its editor, E.F. Jessen, created Jessen's Weekly, a separate newspaper, to compete with the News-Miner. The Weekly lasted until 1968, when it was closed by the Internal Revenue Service. The same year that Jessen founded his weekly newspaper, the United States became involved in the Second World War. Travel to and from Alaska was restricted, and after Japan invaded the Alaska islands of Attu and Kiska, the News-Miner was censored by the U.S. Army. Fairbanks benefited from a military construction boom as the United States built the Northwest Staging Route to ferry Lend-Lease aircraft to the Soviet Union. The boom left the News-Miner short-staffed, but it continued operations throughout the war.

Just before the Japanese surrender that ended the war, News-Miner editor David Tewkesbury died. He was replaced by Art Bremer, a reporter. The post-war boom caused a sudden shortage of newsprint, as paper mills were not able to meet the demand of a growing number of newspapers nationwide. This shortage caused the News-Miner to run short until Lathrop used his industrial connections to divert a shipment from a newspaper that was going out of business.

The post-war years also saw the News-Miner take a more active role in territorial politics. Prior to the 1948 election, Lathrop believed Republican presidential candidate Thomas Dewey would handily defeat Democratic incumbent Harry Truman. To take advantage of the anticipated governmental shift, Lathrop instructed the News-Miner to ramp up its pro-Republican editorials. In order to assist that process, he appointed William Strand, a war correspondent for the Chicago Tribune, as the News-Miner's new editor. Though Truman won the 1948 election, the News-Miner stayed politically active in endorsing Republican candidates and issues. This ended only with Lathrop's death on July 26, 1950.

== Snedden era ==
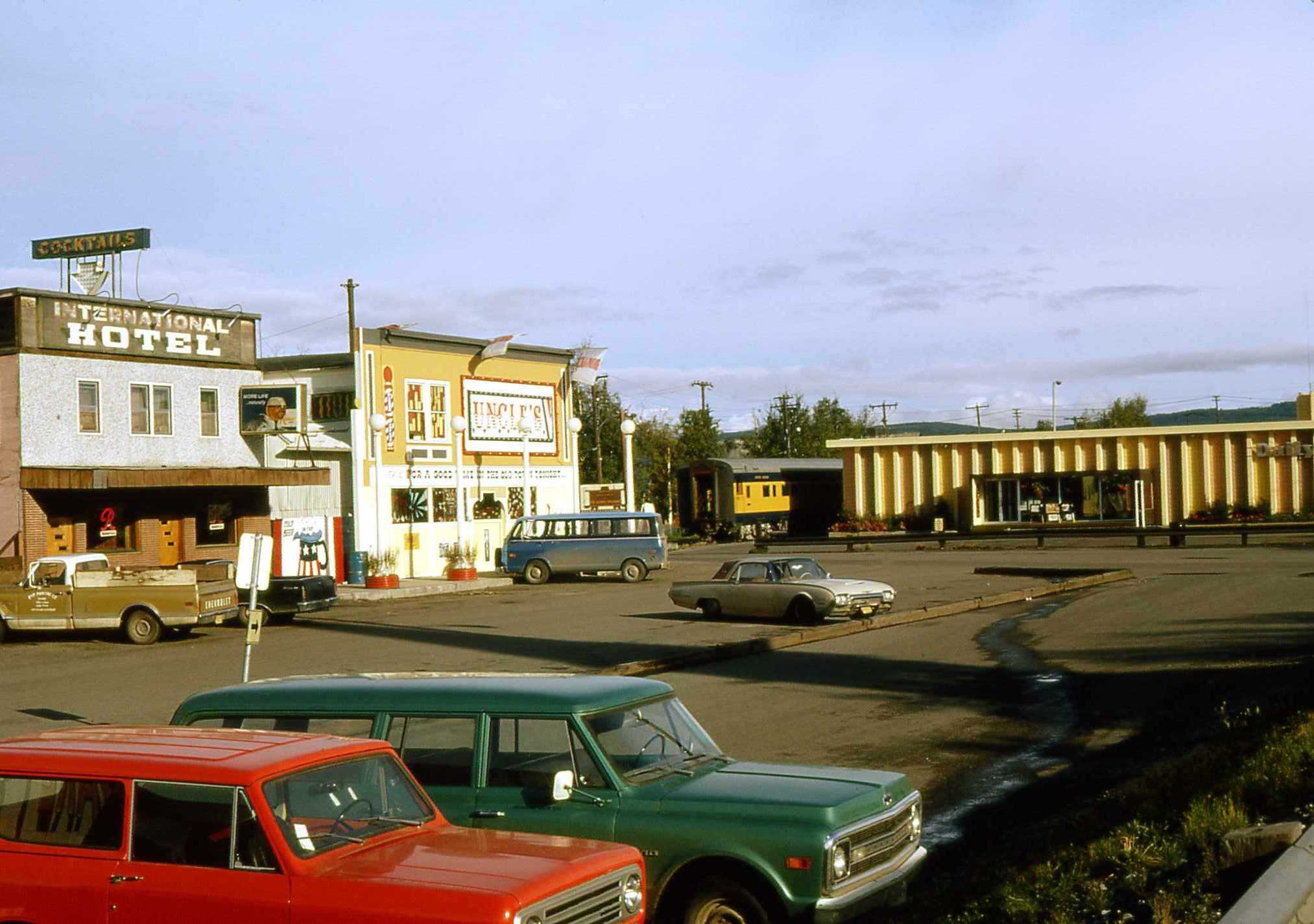
The area at the north end of the Cushman Street Bridge is seen in August 1972. The Aurora Building is at right, several years before its second-story addition.

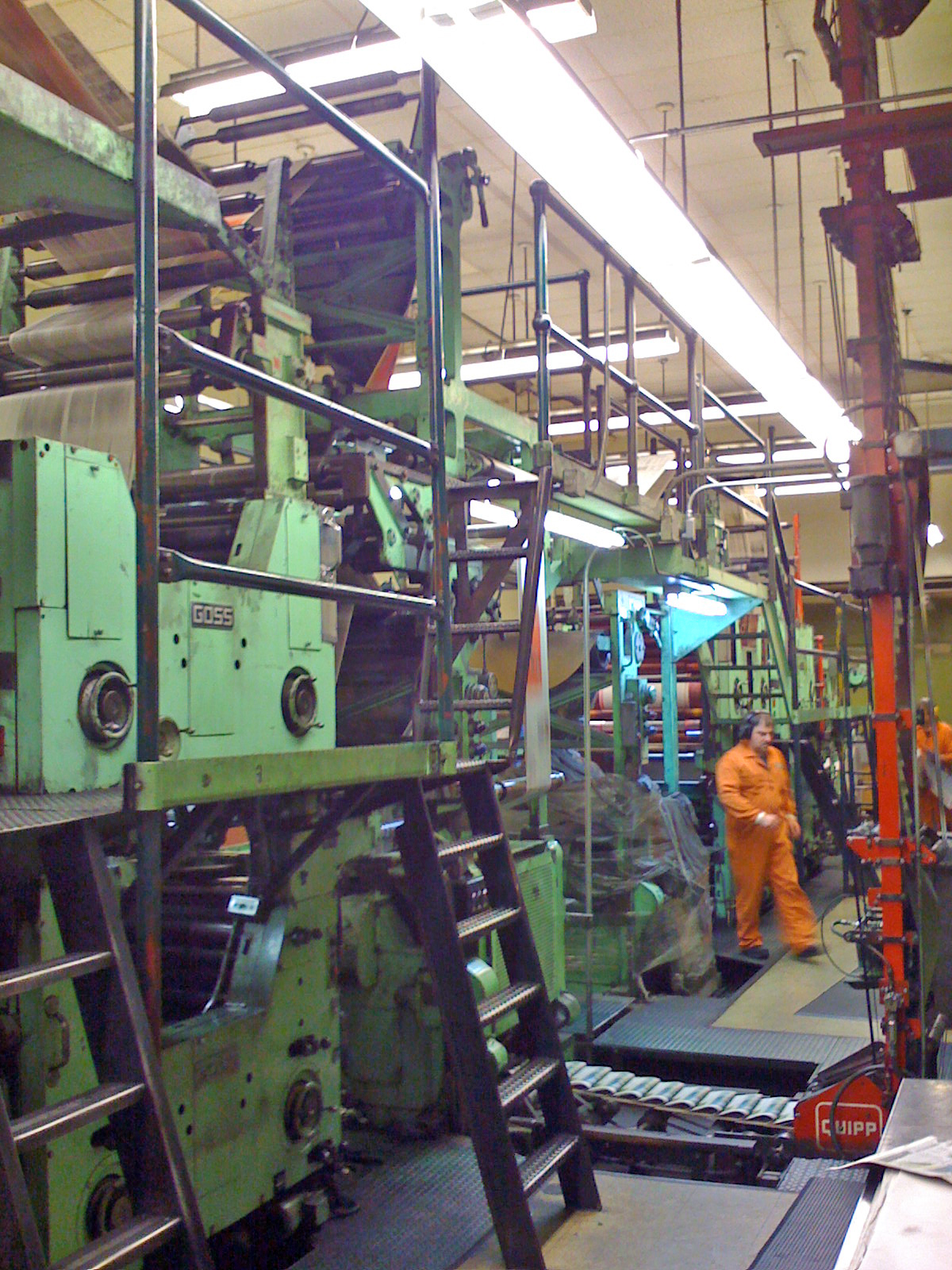
The printing press of the Fairbanks Daily News-Miner is seen in operation.

One week before Lathrop's death, he negotiated the sale of the News-Miner to Charles Willis "Bill" Snedden. Snedden was an efficiency expert and former printer who had been employed by Henry Kaiser during WWII. After the war, he began troubleshooting newspapers. Through 1949 and 1950, Snedden did an efficiency study of the News-Miner and recommended about $100,000 in upgrades. Lathrop was unwilling to spend that much on the newspaper, and Snedden suggested that if Lathrop was unwilling to upgrade, Snedden would be interested in purchasing the paper. The two men worked out a verbal agreement before Lathrop was killed in a coal train accident.

One of Snedden's first actions was to readdress the paper's stance on Alaska statehood. Lathrop and the News-Miner had been strongly opposed to statehood, but after Snedden took control, he analyzed the issue and came out strongly in favor of Alaska statehood. The News-Miner continually published editorials in favor of statehood, and encouraged other newspapers across the U.S. to do the same. In 1955 and 1956, when the Alaska Constitutional Convention took place at the University of Alaska Fairbanks, the News-Miner set up special telephone lines from the convention chambers to the newspaper's office. Daily reports were printed, recording the delegates' progress.

The News-Miner strongly supported the political campaign for statehood until 1959, when Alaska became the 49th state of the United States. On the day the U.S. Congress voted to have Alaska admitted as a state, Snedden arranged for a U.S. Air Force jet to fly copies of the News-Miner, the Anchorage Times, and other Alaska newspapers to Washington, D.C. On the morning after the vote, each congressman had an Alaska newspaper proclaiming statehood.

Snedden also embarked on a series of upgrades to the News-Miner's printing equipment. In 1953, rotary printing was introduced to Fairbanks after Snedden purchased a used rotary press from The Sacramento Union. To house the press, Snedden built a two-story building adjacent to the Lathrop Building. The Lathrop Building still contained most of the News-Miner's offices and typesetting equipment, but it was not large enough to contain the new press without extensive renovations, thus requiring a new building. Shortly after the new press was introduced, the News-Miner produced its first full-color newspaper. The new equipment also allowed for larger print jobs, and Snedden introduced an annual Progress Edition that was intended to be distributed outside Alaska in order to attract business and industry to the state. In 1954, the News-Miner obtained a dedicated teletype to the Associated Press, avoiding the need for contracts for telephone and telegraph service to a correspondent in Seattle who would relay AP material to the News-Miner.

On November 23, 1957, tragedy struck when the Lathrop Building caught on fire. Firemen rushed to the scene to put out the blaze and did so quickly, but not before the television and radio studios on the top floors of the building were destroyed. The News-Miner offices and printing facilities on the lower floors were spared from the flames, but suffered water damage. Due to winter temperatures, the water soon froze. Despite the conditions, the paper was produced on time the next day.

In 1964, the largest earthquake ever recorded in the United States struck Anchorage and southern Alaska, cutting communications to the outside world. The quake was felt in Fairbanks, and it took 40 minutes for communications to be re-established with the Associated Press office in Seattle. When the connection was restored, the News-Miner sent the first reports of the earthquake to the outside world. The quake also destroyed the offices of the Anchorage Times, the leading newspaper in that city. The News-Miner offered its press facilities to the Times, and the two papers shared a masthead as Anchorage recovered from the tremor.

Shortly before the earthquake, the News-Miner placed an order for a modern offset printing press. To house the new press, which could not fit in the Lathrop Building, Snedden ordered the construction of a new printing facility and office—named the Aurora Building—north of the Chena River. The Alaska Railroad sold Snedden the land for the building, which was built at a cost of $1 million in 1965. Snedden ordered the foundation for the new building to be raised 22 inches (0.56 m) above the 100-year flood line. This effort saved the News-Miner two years later during the 1967 Fairbanks flood. The water was three inches deep throughout the paper's offices and even deeper in the press and boiler rooms, which were slightly below that raised level. The flood halted production for a time, and the Anchorage Times reciprocated the post-earthquake favor by publishing the News-Miner's masthead on its editions and posting occasional stories from Fairbanks until electrical power was restored to the town.

In the early 1970s, prior to the construction of the Trans-Alaska Pipeline, the Fairbanks economy was unsteady. The News-Miner planned to expand its printing plant, but many in the company were unsure if the economy could support the added capacity. Over the objections of the News-Miner newsroom, Snedden decided to expand the Aurora Building by adding a second floor at a cost of $2 million. In 1974, as construction of the pipeline got under way, demand for office space in Fairbanks was so great that Alyeska Pipeline Company rented several News-Miner offices in the newly expanded building. About this time, the News-Miner replaced its Associated Press teletypes with a satellite connection.

== MediaNews Group era ==
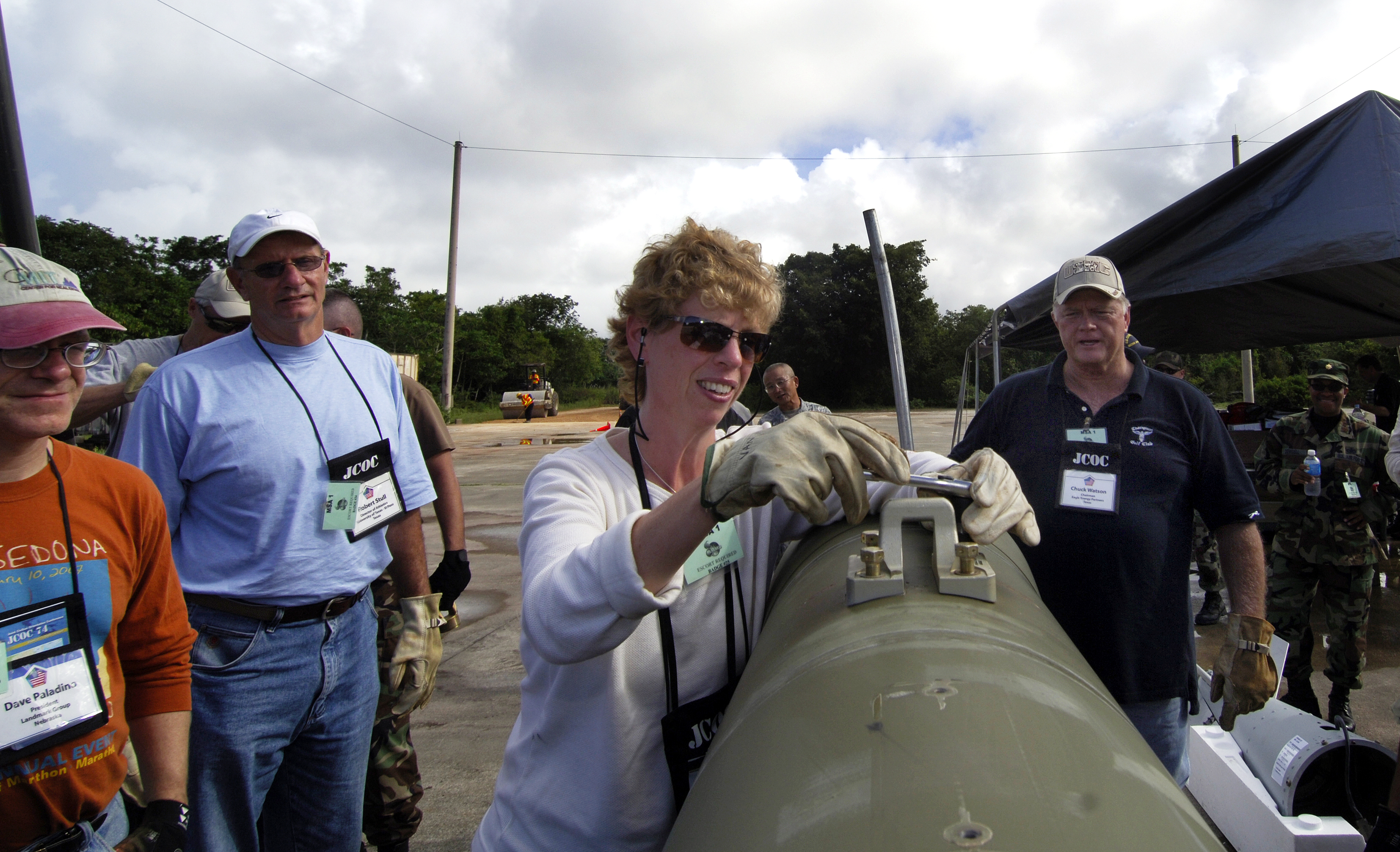
Marilyn Romano, then the newspaper's publisher, participates in the 74th Joint Civilian Orientation Conference at Andersen Air Force Base in November 2007.

In the late 1980s and early 1990s, Snedden created a plan to let the paper's employees buy the company and keep ownership local. This plan was under way at the time of Snedden's death in 1989, but by 1992, many of the paper's employees were nearing retirement age. This factor, and the need for costly upgrades to expand the paper onto the Internet, led to a decision to sell the News-Miner to Dean Singleton and Richard Scudder, co-founders of the MediaNews Group newspaper chain. In order to preserve the paper's independence—something desired by Snedden—the News-Miner was purchased by the family trusts of the two men, with ownership split 50/50 between the two trusts.

In 1998, the News-Miner's owners acquired the Kodiak Daily Mirror from Duane and Nancy Freeman. At the time the News-Miner had a 17,000 circulation and the Mirror a 3,000 circulation. After the sale Nancy Freeman was replaced as Mirror publisher by Asa Cole.

Chuck Gray, the last publisher of the News-Miner under Snedden's ownership (he served from 1989–1992), was retained as publisher emeritus in an advisory capacity. Paul Massey was named the first publisher of the post-Snedden era. He was replaced by Marilyn Romano in 2003. Romano took a job with Alaska Airlines in 2011 as regional vice president. Kathryn Strle became the interim publisher/general manager. In 2012, the paper launched a redesigned website. In 2014, veteran newspaper executive Marti Buscaglia was named publisher. In 2015, the News-Miner added a paywall to its website.

== Back to the Sneddens ==
In January 2016, the News-Miner and Kodiak Daily Mirror were sold to the nonprofit Helen E. Snedden Foundation. At that time the News-Miner had a 13,442 circulation and the Mirror a 1,081 circulation. Fuller Cowell was then made publisher, but retired in 2018 and was replaced by Richard Harris. Revenue declined over the years which led the News-Miner to layoff four employees in 2020, amounting to about 7% of its 55 person staff. Virginia Farmier, executive director of the paper's nonprofit owner, was named publisher in 2023. Later that year the News-Miner eliminated its Saturday print edition.

== Sourdough Jack ==
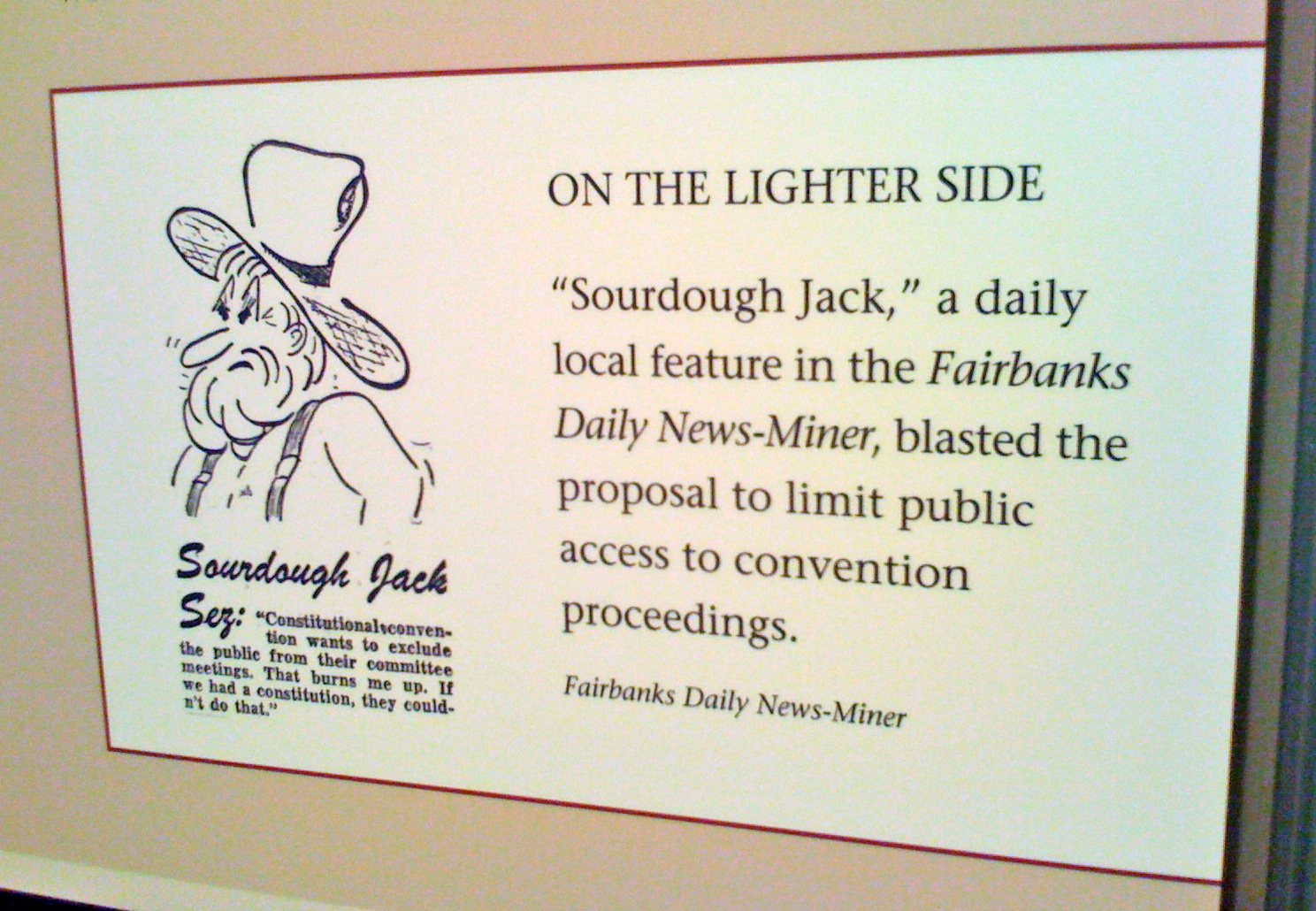
A museum exhibit in Valdez, Alaska, features Sourdough Jack.

Since 1952, the News-Miner has featured a small cartoon figure named "Sourdough Jack" at the bottom of its front page. The drawing of Sourdough Jack is always paired with a comment on a news story, pun, or joke, apparently having been spoken by the figure. The idea for Sourdough Jack came from News-Miner editor John J. Ryan, who said, "People had many complaints about the town. ... He could make fun of that stuff and that would give people a chance to laugh at their problems." Sourdough Jack's name came from Ryan's nickname (Jack) and the traditional nickname given to an old miner (sourdough). Jack Ryan worked for the Seattle Post-Intelligencer later in his life. He got tired of his mail getting mixed up with another journalist, so in the '70s he legally changed it to John O'Ryan.

In the first days of the cartoon's existence, Jack often commented on alcohol, his lack of a job, and his wife. In recent years, the cartoon has taken a politically correct tone, except on occasion. After the Sept. 11 attacks, Sourdough Jack was pictured shaking his fist and saying, "It's time to terrorize the terrorists!" About that time, the original Sourdough Jack drawings that had been reproduced since 1952 were replaced by new drawings made in a similar style. This was required due to the growing fuzziness of the reproduced image and the transition to digital newspaper production.

== Awards and accomplishments ==
In its history, the News-Miner has been awarded dozens of accolades by the Alaska Press Club and other organizations. In 1986, News-Miner reporter Stan Jones was awarded a George Polk Award for writing a story that led to impeachment proceedings against Alaska governor Bill Sheffield. In 2009, the paper won several commendations from the Alaska Press Club for photography, sportswriting, features writing, and other accomplishments.
