= List of weekly newspapers in the United States =

This list of weekly newspapers in the United States is a list of weekly newspapers as described at newspaper types and weekly newspapers that are printed and distributed in the United States.

In particular, this list considers a newspaper to be a weekly newspaper if the newspaper is published once, twice, or thrice a week. A weekly newspaper is usually a smaller publication than a larger, daily newspaper (such as one that covers a metropolitan area). Unlike these metropolitan newspapers, a weekly newspaper will cover a smaller area, such as one or more smaller towns or an entire county. Most weekly newspapers follow a similar format as daily newspapers (i.e., news, sports, family news, obituaries). However, the primary focus is on news from the publication's coverage area. The publication date of weekly newspapers varies, but usually they come out in the middle of the week (e.g., Wednesday or Thursday). This list includes semi-weekly newspapers that may be published twice or thrice a week.

== The 50 states and Washington, D.C. ==
=== Alabama ===
The following are weekly or semi-weekly newspapers published in Alabama:

- The Alabama Baptist – Birmingham
- Birmingham Business Journal – Birmingham
- Daleville Sun-Courier – Daleville
- The Dekalb Advertiser – Fort Payne
- Lagniappe – Mobile
- The North Jefferson News – Gardendale
- The Southeast Sun – Enterprise
- The Times-Record – Fayette
- The Western Star – Bessemer
- Chilton County News – Clanton

=== Alaska ===
- Alaska Journal of Commerce – Anchorage
- Alaska Star – Eagle River and Chugiak
- Anchorage Press – Anchorage
- Arctic Sounder – Northwest Arctic Borough and North Slope Borough
- Bristol Bay Times – Bristol Bay
- Capital City Weekly – Juneau
- Chilkat Valley News – Haines
- Cordova Times – Cordova
- The Delta Discovery – Bethel
- Dutch Harbor Fisherman – Aleutians / Pribilofs
- Homer News – Homer
- Homer Tribune – Homer
- Mat-Su Valley Frontiersman – Wasilla / Matanuska-Susitna Valley (tri-weekly)
- The Nome Nugget – Nome
- Petersburg Pilot – Petersburg
- Petroleum News – Anchorage
- Seward Journal – Seward
- Seward Phoenix Log – Seward, Moose Pass
- Tundra Drums – Bethel and Yukon-Kuskokwim Delta
- The Valdez Star – Valdez

=== Arizona ===
- Ahwatukee Foothills News – Ahwatukee, Phoenix
- Ajo Copper News – Ajo
- Apache Junction News – Apache Junction
- Arizona Business Gazette – Phoenix
- Arizona Capitol Times – Phoenix
- Arizona City Independent – Arizona City
- Arizona Range News – Willcox
- Arizona Silver Belt – Globe
- Bisbee Observer – Bisbee
- Casa Grande Dispatch – Casa Grande
- The Catholic Sun – Phoenix
- Chino Valley Review – Chino Valley
- Fountain Hills Times – Fountain Hills
- Inside Tucson Business – Tucson
- Jewish News of Greater Phoenix – Phoenix
- Kingman Standard – Kingman
- La Voz – Phoenix and Tucson
- Lake Powell Chronicle – Page
- Navajo-Hopi Observer – Flagstaff
- Navajo Times – Window Rock
- Nogales International – Nogales
- The Northwest Explorer – Tucson
- Phoenix Business Journal – Phoenix
- Phoenix New Times – Phoenix
- Sedona Red Rock News – Sedona
- Sonoran News – Cave Creek
- Tucson Weekly – Tucson
- Verde Independent – Cottonwood
- West Valley View – Avondale
- The Winslow Mail – Winslow

=== Arkansas ===
- Sherwood Voice – Sherwood
- Times of Northeast Benton County – Pea Ridge

=== California ===
- The Ark – Tiburon
- Brentwood Press – Brentwood
- Los Cerritos News – Cerritos
- Lucerne Valley Leader – Lucerne Valley
- The Mountain Messenger – Downieville
- Paradise Post – Paradise
- Pasadena Weekly – Pasadena
- Point Reyes Light – Marin

=== Colorado ===
- Intermountain Jewish News – Denver
- Ouray County Plaindealer – Ouray County
- Pagosa Springs Sun – Pagosa Springs
- Rio Blanco Herald Times – Rio Blanco County
- Sopris Sun – Carbondale
- The Mountain Jackpot – Woodland Park

=== Connecticut ===
- The Lakeville Journal – Lakeville, Canaan/Falls Village

=== District of Columbia ===
- The Current Newspapers – Washington, D.C. (ceased in 2019)
- Washington City Paper – Washington, D.C.

=== Florida ===
- The Alachua Advocate – Gainesville, Florida
- Florida Weekly – Fort Myers
- Hendry Glades Sunday News – LaBelle
- Hometown News – 15 East Coast cities
- Jackson County Times – Marianna, Florida
- Miami Today – Miami, Florida
- Observer Newspaper – Deerfield Beach
- Orlando Weekly – Florida
- Tampa Bay Newspapers – Pinellas County (publisher of Beach Beacon, Belleair Bee, Clearwater Beacon, Dunedin Beacon, Largo Leader, Palm Harbor Beacon, Pinellas Park Beacon and Seminole Beacon)
- Windermere Sun – Windermere, Florida

=== Georgia ===
- The Clayton Tribune – Clayton
- Creative Loafing – Atlanta
- North Georgia News – Blairsville
- The Toccoa Record - Toccoa
- Towns County Herald – Hiawassee

=== Hawaii ===
- Honolulu Weekly – Honolulu

=== Idaho ===
- Meridian Press – Meridian
- The Life News – Post Falls
- Messenger-Index – Emmett
- Arco Advertiser – Arco, Idaho

=== Illinois ===
- Chicago Crusader – Chicago
- The Chicago Reader – Chicago
- Illinois Times – Springfield
- Tuscola Review – Tuscola
- Arcola Record-Herald – Arcola
- Lebanon Advertiser – Lebanon
- Galena Gazette – Galena
- The Beverly Review – Chicago
- The Woodstock Independent – Woodstock

=== Indiana ===
- Gary Crusader – Gary
- The Paper of Wabash County – Wabash County
- The Pulaski County Journal – Pulaski County
- The Mount Vernon Democrat – Posey County

=== Iowa ===
- The Chariton Leader – Chariton

=== Kansas ===
- Anderson County Advocate – Garnett
- Anderson County Review – Garnett
- The Anthony Republican – Anthony
- Baldwin City Gazette – Baldwin City
- Basehor Sentinel – Basehor
- The Belle Plaine News – Belle Plaine
- The Belleville Telescope – Belleville
- The Coffeyville Journal – Coffeyville
- The Colby Free Press – Colby
- The Community Voice – Wichita, Kansas
- Concordia Blade-Empire – Concordia
- Conway Springs Star & Argonia Argosy – Conway Springs
- The Courier-Tribune (Kansas) – Seneca
- The Courtland Journal – Courtland
- The Cunningham Courier – Cunningham
- The De Soto Explorer – De Soto
- The Derby Informer – Derby
- Downs News & Times – Downs
- The Eudora News – Eudora
- The Eureka Herald – Eureka
- Farm Talk Newspaper – Parsons
- The Fort Leavenworth Lamp – Fort Leavenworth
- Garden City Telegram – Garden City
- Hays Post – Hays (online only)
- Haysville Sun-Times – Haysville
- The Herington Times – Herington
- Hiawatha World – Hiawatha
- High Plains Journal – Dodge City
- Hillsboro Free Press – Hillsboro
- Hillsboro Star-Journal – Hillsboro
- The Holton Recorder – Holton
- Hometown Girard – Girard
- The Humboldt Union – Humboldt
- The Hype Weekly (alternative weekly newspaper) – Manhattan
- The Iola Register – Iola
- The Jackson County Journal – Holton
- Kansas City Kansan – Kansas City (online only)
- Labette Avenue – Oswego
- Kiowa County Signal – Greensburg
- The Kiowa News – Kiowa
- Larned Tillers & Toiler – Larned
- Marion County Record – Marion
- Marysville Advocate – Marysville
- Montgomery County Chronicle – Caney
- The Mulberry Advance – Mulberry
- The Oxford Register – Oxford
- Peabody Gazette-Bulletin – Peabody
- The Pratt Tribune – Pratt
- Prairie Star – Sedan
- The Rush County News – La Crosse
- The Sentinel-Times – Galena
- St John News – St. John
- The Times-Sentinel – Cheney
- The Topeka Plaindealer – Topeka
- Wamego Smoke Signal – Wamego
- The Wellington Daily News – Wellington (prints once per week but maintains "Daily" in the name)

=== Kentucky ===
- The Cadiz Record – Cadiz

=== Louisiana ===
"The Basile Weekly" Basile, Louisiana "The Ville Platte Gazette" Ville Platte, Louisiana "The Kinder Courier News" Kinder, Louisiana "The Eunice News" Eunice, Louisiana "The Oakdale Journal" Oakdale, Louisiana "The Rayne Tribune" Rayne, Louisiana "The Church Point News" Church Point, Louisiana

- Avoyelles Journal – Avoyelles
- Baton Rouge Weekly Press – Baton Rouge
- Bunkie Record – Avoyelles
- Donaldsonville Chief – Donaldsonville
- Gonzales Weekly Citizen – Gonzales
- Marksville Weekly News – Avoyelles
- Plaquemine Post South – Plaquemine
- The St. Bernard Voice – St. Bernard
- Ouachita Citizen – West Monroe

=== Maine ===
- The Advertiser Democrat – Norway, published once a week on Thursdays
- American Journal – Westbrook
- Aroostook Republican – Caribou
- Augusta Capital Weekly – Augusta
- The Bar Harbor Times – Bar Harbor, published once a week on Thursdays
- The Bates Student – Lewiston, published once a week on Tuesdays
- The Boothbay Register - Boothbay Harbor, published once a week on Thursdays
- The Bowdoin Orient – Brunswick, published once a week on Fridays
- The Bridgton News – Bridgton, published once a week on Thursdays
- The Calais Advertiser – Calais, published once a week on Thursdays
- The Castine Patriot – Castine, published once a week on Thursdays
- The Citizen – Westbrook
- The Colby Echo – Waterville, published once a week on Tuesdays
- The Current – Westbrook, published once a week on Thursdays
- The Ellsworth American – Ellsworth
- The Enterprise – Bucksport
- The Houlton Pioneer Times – Houlton, published once a week on Wednesdays
- The Island Ad-Vantages – Stonington, published once a week on Thursdays
- The Island Times – Casco Bay, published monthly
- Lakes Region Suburban Weekly – Westbrook
- The Lincoln County News – Damariscotta, published once a week on Wednesdays
- The Livermore Falls Advertiser – Livermore Falls, published once a week on Wednesdays
- Machias Valley News Observer – Machias
- Magic City Morning Star – Millinocket
- The Maine Campus – Orono, published twice a week on Mondays and Thursdays
- The Maine Edge – Bangor, published once a week on Wednesdays
- Maine Sunday Telegram – Portland
- The Maine Switch – Portland, published once a week on Thursdays
- The Mid-Coast Forecaster – published weekly alongside The Northern Forecaster, The Portland Forecaster and The Southern Forecaster
- Midcoast Villager – formed by the merger of the Courier-Gazette, Camden Herald, Free Press, Republican Journal, and VillageSoup
- Mount Desert Islander – Bar Harbor, published once a week on Thursdays
- The Northern Forecaster – published weekly alongside The Portland Forecaster, The Mid-Coast Forecaster and The Southern Forecaster
- The Penobscot Times – Old Town
- The Portland Forecaster – published weekly alongside The Northern Forecaster, The Mid-Coast Forecaster and The Southern Forecaster
- Portland Phoenix – Portland, published once a week on Wednesdays
- The Quoddy Tides – Eastport
- The Reporter – Westbrook
- Six Towns Times – Freeport, published weekly on Fridays
- The St. John Valley Times – Madawaska, published once a week on Wednesdays
- The Star-Herald – Presque Isle, published once a week on Wednesdays
- The Southern Forecaster – published weekly alongside The Northern Forecaster, The Mid-Coast Forecaster and The Portland Forecaster
- Sun Chronicle – Westbrook)
- Twin City Times – Auburn, covering Androscoggin County and the surrounding areas; published every Thursday
- The Weekly Packet – Blue Hill, published once a week on Thursdays
- The Weekly Sentinel – Wells, published once a week on Fridays
- Wiscasset Newspaper – Boothbay Harbor, published once a week on Thursdays
- York County Coast Star – Kennebunk, published once a week on Thursdays
- York Weekly – York, published once a week on Wednesdays

=== Maryland ===
- The Cecil Guardian – Elkton, Maryland
- Greenbelt News Review – Greenbelt

=== Massachusetts ===
- The Boston Phoenix – Boston
- Martha's Vineyard Times – Martha's Vineyard
- Winthrop Sun Transcript – Winthrop

=== Michigan ===
- Benton Spirit – Benton Harbor
- Berrien County Record – Buchanan
- Troy-Somerset Gazette – Troy, Michigan
- Harbor Country News – New Buffalo
- The Mears Newz – Mears, Michigan
- Metro Times – Detroit
- New Buffalo Times – New Buffalo

=== Minnesota ===
- City Pages – Minneapolis

=== Mississippi ===
- Charleston Sun-Sentinel
- Clarke County Tribune
- Clarksdale Press Register
- Delta Democrat-Times
- Grenada Star
- Newton County Appeal
- Scott County Times
- Simpson County News
- Tate Record
- The Carroll County Conservative
- The Choctaw Plaindealer
- The Columbian Progress
- The Enterprise-Tocsin
- The Kosciusko Star-Herald
- The Northside Sun
- The Pine Belt News
- The Winona Times
- The Winston County Journal
- The Yazoo Herald
- Webster Progress-Times

=== Missouri ===
- Branson Tri-Lakes News – Branson, Taney County, Stone County
- The Marshfield Mail – Marshfield
- South County Times – St. Louis
- Ste. Genevieve Herald – Ste. Genevieve
- Webster-Kirkwood Times – St. Louis

=== Nebraska ===
- Gering Citizen – Gering

=== Nevada ===
- Northern Nevada Business Weekly
- Moapa Valley Progress

=== New Hampshire ===
- The Hippo – Manchester
- The Londonderry Times – Londonderry
- Manchester Express – Manchester
- The Nutfield News – Londonderry
- The Tri-Town Times – Londonderry

=== New Jersey ===
- Bernardsville News – Bernardsville, Bernards Township, Far Hills, Peapack-Gladstone, and Bedminster
- Chatham Courier – Chatham Township, Chatham Borough
- Echoes-Sentinel – Long Hill Township, Warren Township, Watchung
- Florham Park Eagle – Florham Park
- Hanover Eagle – Hanover Township
- Hunterdon Review – Bethlehem Township, Califon, Clinton Township, Clinton Town, High Bridge, Lebanon Township, Lebanon Borough, Tewksbury Township, and Readington Township
- Madison Eagle – Madison Borough
- Micromedia Publications – Monmouth/Ocean County
- Morris NewsBee – Morris Plains, Morris Township, Morristown
- Mount Olive Chronicle – Mount Olive Township
- Observer-Tribune – Harding Township, Mendham Borough, Mendham Township, Chester Borough, Chester Township, Washington Township
- Randolph Reporter – Randolph Township and Mine Hill Township
- Roxbury Register – Roxbury Township, Mount Arlington
- The Citizen – Rockaway Township, Rockaway Borough, Boonton, Boonton Township, Dover, Denville Township, Mountain Lakes, Montville
- The Community Gazette – Princeton
- The Progress – Caldwell, North Caldwell, West Caldwell, Fairfield, Roseland, Essex Fells
- The Retrospect – Collingswood
- The Westfield Leader – Westfield
- Union County HAWK – Union County
- Union County Local Source – Union Township

=== New Mexico ===
- New Mexico Tribune – Albuquerque
- Santa Fe Reporter – Santa Fe
- Weekly Alibi – Albuquerque
- Las Cruces Bulletin – Las Cruces
- Union County Leader – Clayton

=== New York ===
- Anton Media Group – Nassau County
- Clinton County Free Trader – Plattsburgh
- East Hampton Star – East Hampton
- The Hancock Herald – Hancock
- Long Island Advance – Bayport, Bellport, Blue Point, Patchogue, Mastic, Moriches, and Yaphank
- Long Island Herald – Nassau County
- The Salamanca Press – Salamanca (city), New York
- The Times of Wayne County – Wayne County
- The River Reporter – Sullivan County

=== North Carolina ===
- Cherokee Scout – Murphy
- Clay County Progress – Hayesville
- Creative Loafing – Charlotte
- The Franklin Press – Franklin
- Graham Star – Robbinsville
- The Highlander – Highlands
- The North State Journal – Raleigh
- Smoky Mountain Times – Bryson City

=== North Dakota ===
- The Journal – Crosby
- Tioga Tribune – Tioga

=== Ohio ===
- The Anthony Wayne Mirror – Waterville, Ohio, Whitehouse, Ohio, Monclova, Ohio
- Bethel Journal – Bethel, Chilo, Felicity, Franklin Township, Moscow, Neville, Tate Township, Washington Township
- Community Journal Clermont – Amelia, Batavia, Batavia Township, New Richmond Ohio Township, Pierce Township, Union Township, Williamsburg, Williamsburg Township
- Community Journal North Clermont – Clermont County
- Community Press Mason-Deerfield – Deerfield Township, Kings Mills, Landen, Mason
- Delhi Press – Delhi Township, Sayler Park
- Eastern Hills Journal – Columbia Township, Columbia Tusculum, Fairfax, Hyde Park, Madisonville, Mariemont, Mount Lookout, Oakley, Terrace Park
- Forest Hills Journal – Anderson Township, California, Mount Washington, Newtown
- Hilltop Press – College Hills, Finneytown, Forest Park, Greenhills, Mount Airy, Mount Healthy, North College Hill, Seven Hills, Springfield Township
- Indian Hill Journal – Indian Hill
- Loveland Herold – Loveland
- The Maumee Mirror Maumee, Ohio
- Milford-Miami Adverstiser – Milford/Miami Township
- Northeast Suburban Life
- Northwest Press – Colerain Township and parts of Green Township
- Price Hill Press – Price Hill
- The News-Tribune – Hicksville
- The Spanish Journal – Cincinnati
- Suburban Life
- Tri-County Press
- Western Hills Press – Addyston, Bridgetown, Cheviot, Covedale, Dent, Green Township, Mack, Miami Township, North Bend, Westwood

=== Oklahoma ===
- The Lone Grove Ledger – Lone Grove
- “ McCurtain County Gazette “ – McCurtain County
- Cimarron Valley Communications, LLC – newspaper group publishing the Cushing Citizen, Keystone Gusher and Yale News – covering Payne and Creek Counties and portions of, Lincoln, and Pawnee Counties.

=== Oregon ===
- Beaverton Valley Times – Beaverton
- Central Oregonian – Prineville
- Eugene Weekly – Eugene
- Headlight-Herald – Tillamook
- News Guard – Lincoln City
- News-Times – Forest Grove
- The Outlook – Gresham
- The Portland Mercury – Portland
- Portland Tribune – Portland
- Salem Weekly – Salem
- The Sandy Post – Sandy
- The Source Weekly – Bend
- Willamette Week – Portland
- Wilsonville Spokesman – Wilsonville
- Woodburn Independent – Woodburn

=== Pennsylvania ===
- Bradford Journal – Bradford

=== Rhode Island ===
- The Valley Breeze
- The Portsmouth Times
- The Bristol Phoenix
- The Warren Times-Gazette
- The Sakonnet Times
- The East Providence Post
- The Barrington Times

=== South Carolina ===
- The Chapin Times – Chapin
- The Charleston City Paper – Charleston
- The Newberry Observer – Newberry

=== South Dakota ===
- True Dakotan – Wessington Springs

=== Tennessee ===
- El Crucero Newspaper (Spanish) – Nashville, Murfreesboro, Gallatin, Clarksville (weekly)
- Dresden Enterprise – Dresden
- Eagleville Times – Eagleville (twice-monthly)
- Sewanee Mountain Messenger – Sewanee (weekly)
- Weakley County Press – Martin (twice-weekly)

=== Texas ===
- Frankston Citizen – Frankston
- Jewish Herald-Voice – Houston
- Raymondville Chronicle / Willacy County News – Raymondville
- Cherokeean Herald – Rusk
- The Schulenburg Sticker – Schulenburg
- The Houston Press – Houston www.houstonpress.com
- North Channel Star – Houston
- Northeast News – Houston
- Star-Courier – Highlands/Crosby

=== Utah ===
- Magna Times – Magna
- Salt Lake City Weekly – Salt Lake City

=== Vermont ===
- Addison County Independent – Middlebury
- Bradford Journal-Opinion – Bradford
- Charlotte Citizen – Charlotte
- Deerfield Valley News – Wilmington
- The Essex Reporter – Essex
- Franklin County Courier – Enosburg Falls
- Herald of Randolph – Randolph
- Lake Champlain Islander – Grand Isle County
- Milton Independent – Milton
- Morrisville News and Citizen – Morrisville
- Seven Days – Burlington
- Shelburne News – Shelburne
- Valley Reporter – Waitsfield
- Vermont Eagle – Middlebury
- Vermont Standard – Woodstock

=== Virginia ===
- Alexandria Gazette Packet – Alexandria
- The Amelia Bulletin Monitor – Amelia Court House
- Las Américas Newspaper – Falls Church (Spanish language newspaper)
- Amherst New Era-Progress – Amherst
- Bedford Bulletin – Bedford
- Bland County Messenger – Bland County
- The CentreView – Centreville
- Clinch Valley News – Tazewell
- El Comercio – Woodbridge
- Courier-Record – Blackstone
- El Eco de Virginia – Norfolk (Spanish language newspaper)
- Fairfax Times – Fairfax County
- The Falls Church News Press – Falls Church
- Farmville Herald – Farmville (published twice weekly)
- Flagship News – Norfolk (military newspaper serving the entire Hampton Roads area)
- The Floyd Press – Floyd
- The Galax Gazette – Galax
- Gloucester-Mathews Gazette-Journal – Gloucester
- Greene County Record – Stanardsville
- Henrico Citizen – Henrico County, Virginia (published two times a week)
- El Imparcial – Manassas (Spanish language newspaper)
- Inside Business – Norfolk
- The King George Journal – King George
- Loudoun Times-Mirror – Ashland
- Madison Eagle – Madison
- Mount Vernon Voice – Alexandria
- The New Journal and Guide – Norfolk
- Orange County Review – Orange
- The Page News and Courier – Page County
- The Politico – Arlington County
- Powhatan Today – Powhatan
- Purcellville Gazette – Loudoun County, Virginia
- Rappahannock News – Washington
- The Richlands News-Press – Richlands
- Richmond Free Press – Richmond
- Roanoke Star-Sentinel – Roanoke
- Roanoke Tribune – Roanoke
- The Smithfield Times – Smithfield
- Smyth County News & Messenger – Marion (published two times a week)
- The Southside Messenger – Keysville
- Southside Sentinel – Urbanna
- Style Weekly – Richmond
- Tidewater News – Franklin (published three times a week)
- Tidewater Review – West Point
- El Tiempo Latino – Arlington (Spanish language newspaper)
- The Virginia Gazette – Williamsburg (published two times a week)
- Virginia Lawyers Weekly – Richmond
- La Voz Hispana de Virginia Magazine – Richmond
- Washington County News – Abingdon
- Westmoreland News – Westmoreland County
- Wytheville Enterprise – Wythe County (published two times a week)
- Yorktown Crier-Poquoson Post – Yorktown

=== Washington ===
- Cascadia Weekly – Bellingham
- La Conner Weekly News – Skagit County
- The Facts (Seattle) – Seattle
- Okanogan Valley Gazette-Tribune – Oroville-Tonasket
- Omak-Okanogan County Chronicle – Omak
- The Pacific Northwest Inlander – Spokane
- The Reflector – Battle Ground
- Seattle Weekly – Seattle
- The Stranger – Seattle
- The Wahkiakum County Eagle – Cathlamet, Washington
- Chinook Observer – Long Beach, Washington

=== West Virginia ===
- The Moorefield Examiner – Moorefield
- The Putnam Herald – Huntington
- Pennsboro News – Pennsboro and Ritchie County

=== Wisconsin ===
- Chetek Alert – Chetek
- Isthmus – Madison
- The Onion – Madison
- The Peshtigo Times – Peshtigo
- Shawano Leader – Shawano
- Shepherd Express – Milwaukee

=== Wyoming ===
- Jackson Hole News&Guide – Jackson
- Casper Star Tribune – Casper (starting June 13)

== See also ==
Comprehensive

- Lists of newspapers
- List of newspapers in the United States

Frequency

- List of free daily newspapers in the United States

Circulation

- List of international newspapers originating in the United States
- List of national newspapers in the United States
- List of newspapers in the United States by circulation

Foreign language

- List of French-language newspapers published in the United States
- List of Spanish-language newspapers published in the United States

Specialty

- List of African-American newspapers in the United States
- List of alternative weekly newspapers in the United States
- List of business newspapers in the United States
- List of family-owned newspapers in the United States
- List of Jewish newspapers in the United States
- List of LGBT periodicals in the United States
- List of student newspapers in the United States
- List of supermarket tabloids in the United States
- List of underground press in the United States

Other

- List of defunct newspapers of the United States
