= List of newspapers in Kansas =

This is a list of newspapers in Kansas.

== Daily newspapers ==
This is a list of daily newspapers currently published in Kansas.

- The Abilene Reflector-Chronicle – Abilene
- Atchison Daily Globe – Atchison
- Augusta Daily Gazette – Augusta
- The Chanute Tribune – Chanute
- Clay Center Dispatch – Clay Center
- Columbus News-Report – Columbus
- Council Grove Republican - Council Grove
- The Cowley Courier Traveler – Arkansas City
- The Daily Union – Junction City
- Dodge City Daily Globe – Dodge City
- The El Dorado Times – El Dorado
- Emporia Gazette – Emporia
- Fort Scott Tribune – Fort Scott
- Garden City Telegram – Garden City
- Great Bend Tribune – Great Bend
- Hays Daily News – Hays
- The Hutchinson News – Hutchinson
- Independence Daily Reporter - Independence
- Lawrence Journal-World – Lawrence
- Leavenworth Times – Leavenworth
- The Manhattan Mercury – Manhattan
- McPherson Sentinel – McPherson
- The Morning Sun – Pittsburg
- The Newton Kansan – Newton
- The Olathe News – Olathe
- Ottawa Herald – Ottawa
- Parsons Sun — Parsons
- Shawnee Mission Post - Northern Johnson County
- The Salina Journal – Salina
- The Topeka Capital-Journal – Topeka
- The Wichita Eagle – Wichita

== Weekly newspapers ==
- Anderson County Advocate – Garnett
- Anderson County Review – Garnett
- The Anthony Republican – Anthony
- Baldwin City Gazette – Baldwin City
- Basehor Sentinel – Basehor
- The Belle Plaine News – Belle Plaine
- The Belleville Telescope – Belleville
- The Coffeyville Journal – Coffeyville
- The Colby Free Press – Colby
- The Community Voice - Wichita, Kansas
- Concordia Blade-Empire – Concordia
- Conway Springs Star & Argonia Argosy – Conway Springs
- The Courier-Tribune (Kansas) – Seneca
- The Courtland Journal - Courtland
- The Cunningham Courier - Cunningham
- The De Soto Explorer – De Soto
- The Derby Informer – Derby
- Downs News & Times – Downs
- The Erie Record – Erie
- The Eudora News – Eudora
- The Eureka Herald – Eureka
- Farm Talk Newspaper – Parsons
- The Fort Leavenworth Lamp – Fort Leavenworth
- Garden City Telegram – Garden City
- Hays Post – Hays (online only)
- Haysville Sun-Times – Haysville
- The Herington Times - Herington
- Hiawatha World – Hiawatha
- High Plains Journal – Dodge City
- Hillsboro Free Press – Hillsboro
- Hillsboro Star-Journal – Hillsboro
- The Holton Recorder – Holton
- Hometown Girard – Girard
- The Humboldt Union - Humboldt
- The Iola Register – Iola
- The Jackson County Journal - Holton
- Kansas City Kansan – Kansas City (online only)
- Labette Avenue - Oswego
- The Kiowa News – Kiowa
- Larned Tillers & Toiler – Larned
- Marion County Record – Marion
- Marysville Advocate – Marysville
- Montgomery County Chronicle – Caney
- The Mulberry Advance – Mulberry
- The Neodesha Derrick – Neodesha
- The Oxford Register – Oxford
- Peabody Gazette-Bulletin – Peabody
- Prairie Star – Sedan
- The Rush County News – La Crosse
- The Sabetha Herald – Sabetha
- The Sentinel-Times – Galena
- The Times-Sentinel – Cheney
- The Topeka Plaindealer - Topeka
- Tri-County Tribune –Pratt
- Wamego Smoke Signal - Wamego
- The Wellington Daily News - Wellington

== University newspapers ==
- Advocate - Kansas City Kansas Community College
- The Bulletin - Emporia State University
- The Campus - Ottawa University
- The Collegio - Pittsburg State University
- Kansas State Collegian - Kansas State University
- The Baker Orange - Baker University
- The Sunflower - Wichita State University
- University Daily Kansan - University of Kansas
- The University Leader - Fort Hays State University
- The Washburn Review - Washburn University

== Defunct newspapers ==
- Atchison Champion - Atchison
- Baldwin City Signal - Baldwin City
- The Bonner Springs-Edwardsville Chieftain – Bonner Springs
- The Commercial Bulletin (Lane)
- The Emporia News
- Enterprise–Chronicle – Burlingame – vol. 26 in 1921
- The Girard Press – Girard
- Herald of Freedom - Lawrence
- Kansas Free State - Lawrence
- Kiowa County Signal – Greensburg
- Labor Chieftain – Topeka (1885–1887)
- Lawrence Republican – Lawrence – vol. 3 in 1859–60
- St John News – St. John
- Topeka State Journal (1892–1980)

== See also ==
Comprehensive

- Lists of newspapers
- List of newspapers in the United States

Frequency

- List of free daily newspapers in the United States
- List of weekly newspapers in the United States

Circulation

- List of international newspapers originating in the United States
- List of national newspapers in the United States
- List of newspapers in the United States by circulation
- List of newspapers serving cities over 100,000 in the United States

Foreign language

- List of French-language newspapers published in the United States
- List of German-language newspapers published in the United States
- List of Spanish-language newspapers published in the United States

Specialty

- List of African-American newspapers in the United States
- List of alternative weekly newspapers in the United States
- List of business newspapers in the United States
- List of family-owned newspapers in the United States
- List of Jewish newspapers in the United States
- List of LGBTQ periodicals in the United States
- List of student newspapers in the United States
- List of supermarket tabloids in the United States
- List of underground press in the United States

Other

- List of defunct newspapers of the United States
