= The Hutchinson News =

American newspaper

- Type: Daily newspaper
- Format: Broadsheet
- Owner: USA Today Co.
- Founder: Houston Whiteside
- Photo editor: Sandra Milburn
- Staff writers: Alice Mannette, John Green
- Founded: July 4, 1872
- Language: English
- Headquarters: Hutchinson, Kansas; United States
- Circulation: 13,210
- OCLC number: 8814408
- Website: hutchnews.com

The Hutchinson News is a daily newspaper serving the city of Hutchinson, Kansas, United States. The publication was awarded the 1965 Pulitzer Prize for Public Service "for its courageous and constructive campaign, culminating in 1964, to bring about more equitable reapportionment of the Kansas Legislature, despite powerful opposition in its own community."

== History ==
The Hutchinson News began July 4, 1872, when Houston Whiteside, a young Tennessee lawyer, published the first paper. The modern Hutchinson News dates to October 10, 1895, when W.Y. Morgan purchased The News after turning over the Emporia Gazette to William Allen White. By 1920, The News had a circulation of nearly 12,000 and was in a daily battle with The Hutchinson Gazette.

In 1924, Morgan purchased the Gazette and renamed it the Herald. He published two papers, The Herald in the morning and The News at night, with separate staffs working in the same plant. When Morgan died in 1932, his wife took over the papers. A year later she sold the papers to Hutchinson Publishing Co., principal members of which were John P. and Sidney Harris. John P. Harris became publisher and circulation grew to 50,000. A Sunday paper was started in 1937 and the two papers were consolidated into The Hutchinson News-Herald in 1942. The Harrises acquired more newspapers, mostly in Kansas, and the company became known as Harris Enterprises, which ultimately included the Garden City Telegram, Hays Daily News, Ottawa Herald, The Salina Journal, and The Hawk Eye of Burlington, Iowa, as well as MarketAide, an advertising and marketing firm in Salina, and Harris Business Services, a shared services company.

The newspaper moved to its current headquarters in 1957 and dropped "Herald" from the name. In 1965, The News won journalism’s most coveted award, the Pulitzer Prize for meritorious service, for its four-year editorial and court battle for reapportionment in Kansas. In August 1988, The News converted to an all-morning publication. The News employed approximately 120 full- and part-time employees. Hutchinson Publishing Co. grew to operate not just The Hutchinson News but also The Bee, a shopper publication, and LogicMaze, an Internet services company. Employees, through an employee stock ownership plan, owned a portion of Harris Enterprises.

In November 2016, GateHouse Media announced it was purchasing The News and the other Harris newspapers.

== Editors and Publishers ==
- 1872 Houston Whiteside, L.J. Perry
- 1875 Fletcher Meredith
- 1889 Ralph Easley
- 1891 Marion Watson
- 1895 A.L. Sponsler
- 1895 W.Y. Morgan
- 1932 Mrs. W.Y. Morgan
- 1933 John P. Harris
- 1962 Peter Macdonald
- 1963 Peter Macdonald, John McCormally
- 1965 Stuart Awbrey
- 1979 Richard Buzbee
- 1993 Wayne Lee
- 1996 Bruce Buchanan
- 1997 Jim Bloom
- 2006 John D. Montgomery
- 2016 Ron Sylvester (editor)
- 2018 Steve Lundblade (publisher)
- 2018 Cheyenne Derksen

== See also ==
- List of newspapers in Kansas
