= Parsons Sun =

Newspaper published in Kansas, US

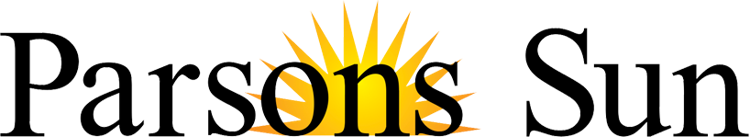

- Front page of the Parsons Sun for Thursday, September 22, 2011
- Type: Semiweekly
- Format: Broadsheet
- Owner: Montgomery Media Group LLC
- Founder(s): Milton W. Reynolds; Leslie J. Perry
- Editor: Ray Nolting
- Founded: June 17, 1871 (154 years ago, as The Sun)
- Language: English
- Headquarters: 1724 Main Street, Parsons, Kansas
- Circulation: 1,700
- Sister newspapers: Chanute Tribune
- OCLC number: 12276956
- Website: parsonssun.com

The Parsons Sun, originally named The Sun, is a semi-weekly newspaper serving Parsons, Kansas and the surrounding Southeast Kansas. It is the second-largest newspaper in Labette County, behind Farm Talk. It has a circulation of 2,632. The newspaper is published every Tuesday and Friday and is owned by Montgomery Media Group.

The Parsons Sun was founded in 1871 by Milton W. Reynolds and Leslie J. Perry, though the latter left after the first issue was published. Over the years the Parsons Sun has been owned and operated by several notable people, such as two Kansas governor's. The Parsons Sun has also survived intense competition over the years, most notably from The Parsons Daily Eclipse.

== History ==
=== Founding and early years ===
The first issue of The Parsons Sun was published on June 17, 1871, in the same year that the city of Parsons, was incorporated. The original name of the Parsons Sun was The Sun, and it published weekly. Initially it was four pages, eight columns, which was not uncommon for the time. However, most modern newspapers like The New York Times use six columns, though they previously used eight until 1978. It cost 2 dollars for a years subscription.

Originally the paper was co-owned by Milton W. Reynolds and Leslie J. Perry. Reynolds was born in Elmira, New York and had previously edited the Detroit Free Press and The Nebraska City News along with founding several newspapers across the Midwest. Meanwhile, Perry had been born in Michigan, but moved to Wisconsin and served in the Second Wisconsin Volunteer Infantry where he was captured and sent to Andersonville. Much like Reynolds, Perry had also founded several newspapers. Almost immediately after founding the paper, in August 1871, Perry sold his stake in the newspaper for unknown reasons. He later founded The Kansas Spirit in Paola, Kansas, which soon became The Western Spirit.

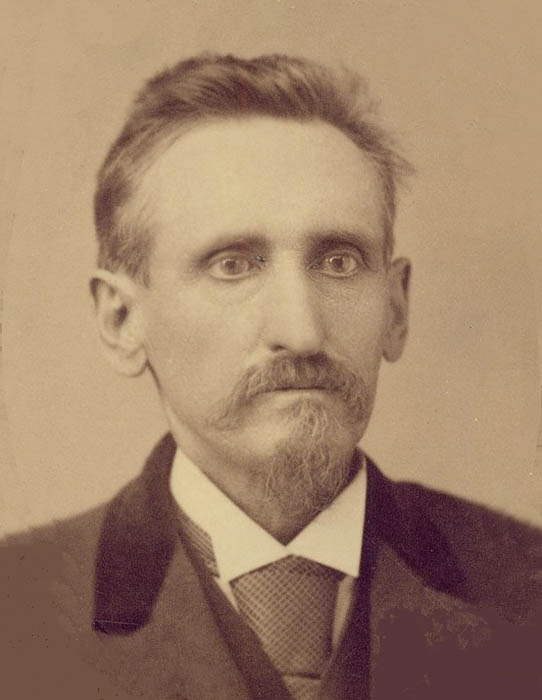
Photo of Milton W. Reynolds, co-founder of the Parsons Sun

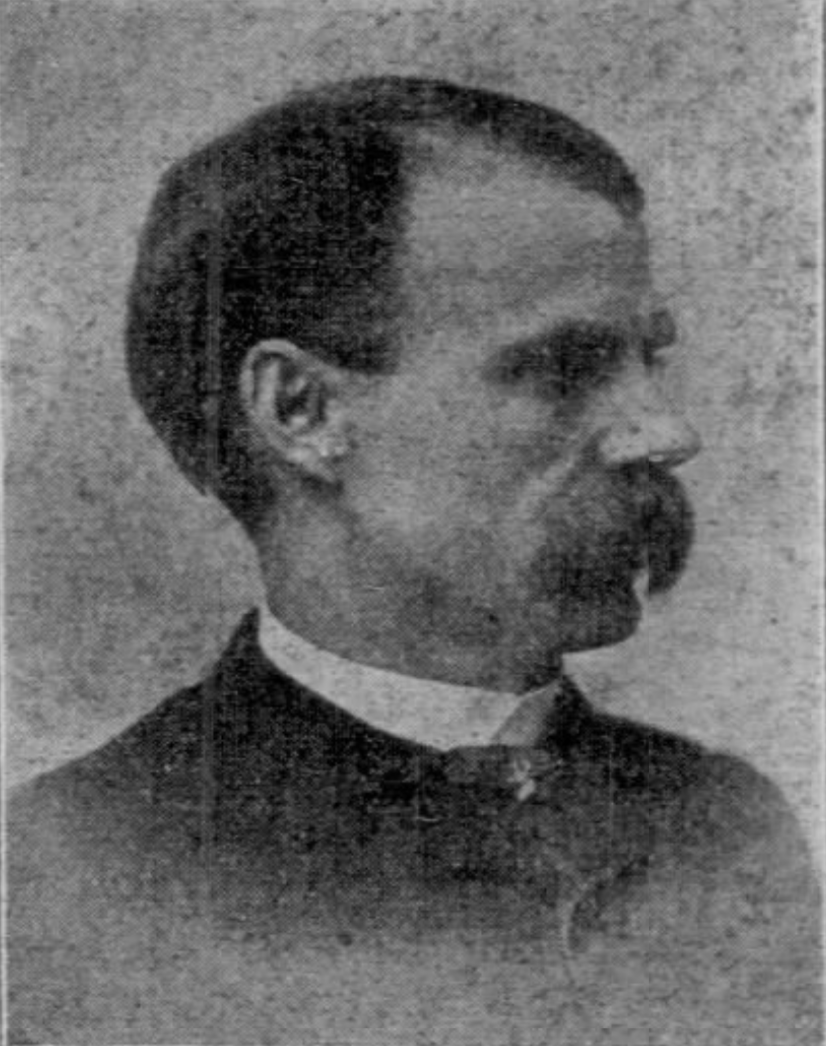
Photo of Leslie J. Perry, co-founder of the Parsons Sun

Due to Perry not selling his share of the paper to him, Reynolds worked with multiple different co-owners, though none for more than two years. It was also during Reynolds tenure that the paper had a strong liberal bias. This was due, in part to Reynold being elected to the Kansas Legislator in 1876. Reynold also had previously been elected to the Nebraska Territorial Legislator. He only served one term in the Legislator, as he lost reelection. The same year, another newspaper, The Parsons Surprise was consolidated into The Sun. Despite this, the newly merged paper struggled to make profit, and for six months from November 11, 1876, to May 12, 1877, the paper was forced to shut down. Reynolds would reopen it as the sole owner. Despite the paper reopening, it still struggled financially. This in part may be due to Reynolds printing five to ten thousand copies of the paper for news he considered important, at a time when the city of Parsons had a population of only 4,199. He would then ship these extra copies to other towns and notable politicians to garner support for his political agenda. Eventually in 1878 Reynolds retired from The Sun and The Leavenworth Press, selling the paper to Harry H. Lusk. He retired after prominent businessmen in Parsons rejected his idea to published 100,000 copies of the paper to ship throughout the U.S. Reynolds moved to Oklahoma several years later and founded the oldest newspaper in Oklahoma, The Edmond Sun, which later merged with The Norman Transcript due to drops in ad revenue from the COVID-19 pandemic. Reynolds would also regularly write guest column for newspapers under the alias Kicking Bird. Reynolds would attempt to found another paper in Parsons, The Daily Evening Star. The venture was started with an George Higgens but the effort folded within the year. Eventually Reynolds would die in 1890 and was buried in an unmarked grave in Oklahoma.

Harry Lusk, whom Reynolds had sold the paper to, was a prominent community member in Parsons, having become postmaster of the city. He had also previously edited the Olney Ledger. Lusk soon turned around the fortunes of the paper, and was able to change The Sun's publishing to daily (Except for Monday) in 1880. The masthead was thus changed to The Parsons Daily Sun. A year later, in 1881, The Parsons Daily Sun would start a Sunday edition of the newspaper called The Parson's Sun. This is not to be confused with the modern paper, which is of the same name. In 1884 the name of the Sunday edition changed to The Parson's Weekly Sun. (It was also briefly published as The Parsons Sun and Semi-Weekly Herald). In 1901 the masthead of the daily paper was changed, back to The Sun. After his death in 1902 the Topeka State Journal called Lusk the best newspaper man in Southeast Kansas.

=== Under Henry Allen and the Reed family ===
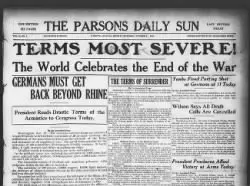
Front page of the Parsons Daily Sun, displaying the end of WWI.

In 1903 Henry J. Allen bought the paper from Lusk's estate. The same year the paper started publishing news from the Associated Press Morse Service. He also changed the paper to an afternoon paper. At the time Allen also owned the Ottawa Herald and Salina Journal, and would go on to own Topeka State Journal and The Manhattan Nationalist, among other newspapers. A prominent player in Kansas politics, Allen lived in Wichita in a house designed by Frank Lloyd Wright. He was the first owner of the paper to not live in Parsons. In 1902, the paper he changed the masthead to The Parsons Sun, and then less than a year later once more, to The Parsons Daily Sun. During his tenure as owner of the paper the Parsons Weekly Sun had still been publishing, and in 1908 it was sold to a J. B. Lamb, and it became folded into The Parsons Eclipse. Allen sold his majority stake in the paper in 1914 to Clyde Reed, a close acquaintance, and would go on to become Governor of Kansas. He would later be inducted into the Kansas Press Association's Hall of Fame.

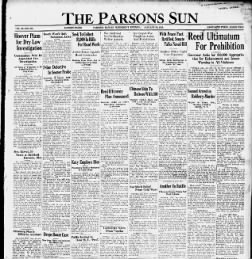
First front page with the modern masthead name, "The Parsons Sun". Later the word, "The" would be dropped.

Unlike Allen, Reed had a much closer relation with the paper, and lived in Parsons. He also served as a war correspondent in the Spanish–American War. In 1920 the Parsons Sun printing press burnt to the ground, and despite being bitter rivals, the paper would be printed in Oswego, by The Parsons Daily Eclipse. The fire caused 27,000 dollars in damage, or over 423,000 dollars in 2025. The Parsons Daily Eclipse would shut down due to Celcus Lamb, the paper's owner, dying in 1921. In 1929 The Parsons Daily Sun dropped the word Daily from the Masthead, turning the paper into the Parsons Sun, though the paper was still published daily, except for Sunday. The name would not be changed again. The same year, Reed was elected Governor of Kansas. Then for ten years between 1939 and 1949, Reed was United States Senator. The same year he lost is election bid a brutal blizzard descended onto the Great Plains and North West, killing 33 people and delivering snow drifts 3–8 times what was considered normal. During this blizzard, power was cut to the Parsons Sun, rendering it unable to publish the paper. To solve this, the paper reached out to the Katy railroad for help. In response, the railroad ran a power cable to The Parson's Sun printing presses from the train depot's generator so that they could print their newspaper in a timely manner. The first issue back the staff ran the advert "Resurgam" or Latin for "I will rise again." After losing his reelection bid, Reed died, age 78, after falling down a step of stairs. Reed, like Allen, was later inducted into the Kansas Press Association hall of fame.

After Reed Died, his son, Clyde Reed Jr. took over the paper. Born in Parsons, he spent much of his time working on the paper. This included being inaugurated into the Kansas Press Association hall of fame, like his predecessors. Also under his leadership, the Parsons Sun moved to its current location in 1962. Clyde Reed Jr. retired in 1982 due to health issues, and sold the paper. Despite no longer being in charge of the newspaper, Reed Jr. continued to be active in Parsons. He stopped both the ammunition plant and the Katy railroad from leaving the city, though injunctions from the federal government and judiciary. Though the Katy did eventually leave when Union Pacific bought it. He later died in 1993 in Lawrence, Kansas, posthumously getting elected to the Kansas Press Association Hall of Game, much like Allen and his father, along with getting the Clyde M. Reed Jr. Master Editor Award.

=== Consolidation ===
The Reed family would be the last local owners of the paper. The Sun was sold in March 1982 up to Harris Enterprises, a Kansas newspaper chain based in Hutchinson. At the time the paper had a 9,000 daily circulation. Under Harris Enterprises in 1986, Oliver Redmond, a former patrolman for the Parsons Police Department, sued the Parsons Sun for libel, claiming that statements in a 1979 article were false. The article in question covered Redmond's last place defeat in a city commissioner primary. After going to the Kansas Supreme Court The Parsons Sun won the case, as Redmond failed to prove any damages whatsoever. Eventually, an online version of the Parsons Sun was launched in 1997 by editor and publisher Ann K. Charles. It was also under Ann K. Charles when in 2003 The Chanute Tribune and the Parsons Sun became sister newspapers, and The Chanute Tribune began printing its newspaper on the Parsons Sun's press.

In 2016, Gatehouse Media bought Harris Enterprises, and with it, the Parsons Sun. Gatehouse soon sold the paper to Kansas Newspapers LLC in 2018, a year before its merger with Gannet. Kansas Newspapers LLC would later change the publishing days to five days a week. In 2023, Kansas Newspapers LLC sold the paper to Montgomery Media Group, who then changed the publishing from five days a week to twice-weekly.

In December 2025 the paper broke the news of an underground nuclear power plant being built by Deep Fission in Great Plains Industrial Park, a major local issue which would garner national attention.

== Competition ==
Despite being founded almost immediately after the city of Parsons was established, the Parsons Sun was not the first newspaper to reside in the town. The first newspaper was The Anti-Monopolist which published five editions between January and February 1971. The Parsons Sun also was not the first daily newspaper in Parsons, as The Daily Record was founded in 1867, but was suspended less than half a year later, when the owner became a travailing salesmen for the Parsons Sun. While a variety of newspapers have been founded in Parsons, none but the Parsons Sun and the relatively new Farm Talk, a trade publication, have survived to this day.

=== The Parsons Eclipse ===
The Parsons Eclipse was founded on April 9, 1874, when an Dr. J. H. Lamb bought the Parsons Weekly Herald following its bankruptcy. Dr. Lamb had been a surgeon in the American Civil War. The paper had a conservative bias, and frequently feuded with the more liberal Parsons Sun, and the two papers regularly attempted tried to undermine each other's reliability. In 1878 the paper took up a daily schedule and such changed its name to The Parsons Daily Eclipse, though the Sunday edition kept the name of The Parsons Eclipse. Eventually his son, Celsus Lamb took over, and turned the newspaper into a daily in 1981. Despite the paper doing well financially, when Celsus Lamb died in 1922, the paper would also close.

== Printing ==
While the online site is updated daily, the Parsons Sun prints twice a week on Tuesdays and Fridays, with home delivery. The circulation of the newspaper is 2,632, and prints in six columns. Legal notices are also published in the Parsons Sun.

Along with printing a newspaper, the Parsons Sun produces a yearly community guide for the city of Parsons, along with other special interest publications for the community. The Parsons Sun also printed its sister newspaper The Chanute Tribune. In November 2023 the Parsons Sun shut down it printing press and moved its printing operations to Independence.

== See also ==
- List of Newspapers in Kansas
- Parsons
