= Fort Sully =

Fort Sully may refer to:

- Fort Sully (Fort Leavenworth), a Civil War artillery battery built west of Fort Leavenworth in 1864
- Fort Sully (South Dakota) (1863-1894), a military post originally built for the Indian Wars
