= AreaVibes =

Canadian data analytics and real estate company

Coordinates: 43°40′18″N 79°17′35″W

AreaVibes, Inc.
- AreaVibes logo

- Screenshot AreaVibes homepage
- Company type: Internet
- Website type: Municipal demographic data and ranking
- Available in: English
- Founded: 2009
- Headquarters: 2146A Queen St East Suite 53 Toronto ON M4E 1E3
- Area served: Canada, United States
- CEO: Jon Russo
- Industry: Real estate
- Products: Cost of Living Calculator; Livability score
- Launched: August 30, 2010
- Current status: Online

AreaVibes is a data analytics and real estate company based in Toronto, which provides clients with demographic data and analysis focused on real estate in American and Canadian cities.

== Background ==
The online data collector Datanyze states that AreaVibes was founded in 2009 by Canadian entrepreneur Jon Russo. The Government of Canada corporate registry states more specifically that AreaVibes was incorporated 4 November 2009. AreaVibes states that their aggregate data "takes into account dozens of characteristics in seven different categories including nearby amenities, cost of living, crime rates, employment, schools, housing and user ratings." The methodology employed by AreaVibes is publicly available on the company website. In 2020, it was revealed that AreaVibes outsources content writing services from Las Vegas-based search engine optimization company TextBroker.

== Crime Data ==
AreaVibes online methodology states that crime data is taken from FBI Uniform Crime Reports and from Statistics Canada. In 2021, Business Insider stated that "AreaVibes is a useful resource for learning more about the crime rates in your zip code... AreaVibes also categorizes how much of reported crime falls under either violent crime or property crime, then breaks it down into smaller categories such as assault, burglary, and vehicle theft." In a comparison of various crime reporting websites published in The News & Observer, journalist Bob Wilson stated "one site that struck me as more reliable than others is AreaVibes.com." Other publications, however, have criticized and questioned AreaVibes crime data; for example, in 2017, the Farmville Herald argued that AreaVibes crime rankings "ignore the uniqueness of each locale." In 2021, the Great Falls Tribune stated that AreaVibes' crime data "is inaccurate and some of its sourcing is suspect."

== Livability score ==
AreaVibes employs the term "livability score" as a way to rank various cities, towns, and neighborhoods. While reporting for the Belleville News-Democrat in 2014, Mark Hodapp stated that AreaVibes "created the scoring system using a unique algorithm" and that the livability score is "designed to help people find the best places to live." According to a statement posted on the AreaVibes website, the company explains that their Livability Score "is a score out of 100... designed to help people quickly and easily evaluate the quality of an area... [and] consists of 7 different categories and dozens of data points across multiple data sets."

== In publications ==
Data reported by AreaVibes has been referenced in a number of popular news publications such as the Huffington Post and Business Insider, as well as in municipal newspapers such as the Great Falls Tribune and the Beaumont Enterprise. As of 2022, the academic database ProQuest lists 113 scholarly sources that reference AreaVibes; for example, in 2018, AreaVibes demographic data on Borough Park, Brooklyn was cited in an article published in the academic journal Contemporary Jewry.
