= HPJ =

HPJ may refer to:

- .HPJ, a file extension used by Microsoft WinHelp
- Hewlett-Packard Journal
- High Plains Journal
- Women's Defence Forces (Kurdish: Hêzên Parastina Jinê), part of the Kurdistan Free Life Party
