= The Hawk Eye =

Newspaper in Burlington, Iowa

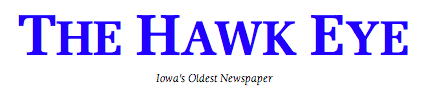
- The Tuesday, March 5, 2013, front page of The Hawk Eye
- Type: Daily newspaper
- Format: Broadsheet
- Owner: Community Media Group
- Publisher: Bill Helenthal
- Founded: 1837 (as The Wisconsin Territorial Gazette and Burlington Advertiser)
- Headquarters: 800 South Main Street; Burlington, Iowa 52601; United States
- Circulation: 5,650
- Website: thehawkeye.com

The Hawk Eye is a general-circulation newspaper based in Burlington, Iowa, United States, and bills itself as "Iowa's Oldest Newspaper."

== History ==
The newspaper traces its roots to the Wisconsin Territorial Gazette and Burlington Advertiser, which was established July 10, 1837, by James Clarke and Cyrus Jacobs. Clarke and Jacobs moved to Burlington from Belmont, Wisconsin, when the capital of the Wisconsin Territory was moved to Burlington. The pair did printing work for the territorial government, and were aligned with the Democratic Party. In 1838, a separate Iowa Territory was created, and Burlington was named its first capital. (The capital of the Wisconsin Territory was moved to Madison). The newspaper became the Iowa Territorial Gazette.

In Burlington, Jacobs was killed Oct. 31, 1838, in a duel that culminated a "long-simmering" political dispute with local attorney David Rorer. Jacobs was on the verge of a prominent career in state politics. Rorer never was charged.

Clarke became postmaster of Burlington and later its mayor. Still later, Clarke was named the third and last governor of the Iowa Territory. Clarke County in southern Iowa is named in his honor. After his term as governor, Clarke returned to Burlington to run the Gazette. He was elected as the first president of the Burlington School Board. He died July 28, 1850, in a local cholera epidemic. He was 38. Rorer was one of the pall bearers.

A rival newspaper, the Iowa Patriot, was moved in 1838 from Fort Madison to Burlington by James G. Edwards. Edwards was a supporter of the Whig Party. At Rorer's urging, Edwards changed the name of his paper to the Burlington Hawk-Eye and Iowa Patriot in tribute to Chief Black Hawk. Black Hawk was a friend of Edwards and reportedly was present when the first copies of the Fort Madison paper were printed. Rorer wrote anonymous letters to other Iowa newspapers suggesting the territory adopt "Hawkeye" as the state nickname. Consequently, Iowa now is known as the Hawkeye State.

According to the Iowa Journal of History, Edwards wrote, "If a division of the territory is effected, we propose that the Iowans take the cognomen of Hawk-eyes. Our etymology can then be more definitely traced than can that of the Wolverines, Suckers, Gophers, etc., and we shall rescue from oblivion a memento, at least, of the name of the old chief. Who seconds the motion?"

The journal goes on to state, " 'old chief' referred to was, of course, Black Hawk."

Edwards published his newspaper until his death of cholera a year after Clarke died. He was 50.

In the 1920s, both newspapers built new buildings. The Gazette published from a building noted for its terra cotta tile on Washington Street across the street from the Elks Club; The Hawk Eye from a building on Fourth Street next to the Congregational Church. It, too, was a handsome structure, featuring Doric columns in the front. After a succession of owners, both papers experienced financial difficulties during the Depression, and were purchased by Omar N. Custer, owner of the Galesburg, Illinois, Register-Mail. Custer merged the papers into The Burlington Hawk-eye Gazette. The papers moved into the Gazette's building.

In 1941, Custer sold The Burlington Hawk-Eye Gazette to Kansas publishers Jack and Sidney Harris. The Harris organization owned The Hawk Eye for 75 years before selling its papers to GateHouse Media.

In 1959, the newspaper relocated to a renovated bus barn at 800 S. Main St., where it continues to publish. At the time of the move, the paper added a Sunday edition. The newspaper plant overlooks the BNSF rail yards and is in close proximity to the Mississippi River. During the record flood of 1993, preparations were made to print the paper at Ottumwa, Iowa, about 70 miles away. However, the water did not rise high enough to carry out the plan. Instead, water from the rising Des Moines River flooded the Ottumwa paper's basement where it stored its newsprint, and the Courier had to be printed in Burlington.

During the Flood of 2008, which eclipsed the 1993 crest, The Hawk Eye avoided high water again.

After The Hawk-Eye Gazette's move to Main Street, the former building was acquired by an adjacent savings and loan and razed to create extra parking. The former Hawk Eye building still stands and is now used as a funeral home.

On Dec. 1, 2016, The Hawk Eye and five other Harris papers were sold to GateHouse Media for $20 million. Within seven months, GateHouse laid off half of the newsroom and other employees, an action seen at other Harris papers.

== About Harris Enterprises ==
The group's origins trace to Ottawa, Kansas, and to the early years of the 20th century. In 1907, Ralph A. Harris purchased the Ottawa Herald, then combined it with the Ottawa Republic in 1915. Later, Harris' two sons, John and Sidney, expanded the group and set its standards. Starting with The Herald as the base, they acquired another Kansas daily, the Chanute Tribune, in 1927, with John as editor. When Ralph Harris died in 1930, Sidney became The Herald's editor and publisher, a position he held until his death in 1955.

In 1933, the Harrises bought The Hutchinson News, which became the flagship publication. As The News' editor and publisher, John Harris became a widely quoted columnist and influential editorial writer. He died in 1969. In Iowa, The Hawk Eye at Burlington was brought into the fold in 1941. Full ownership of The Salina Journal was added in 1949; a minority had been acquired 11 years earlier.

Other Kansas dailies in the group were the Garden City Telegram, purchased in 1953; and the Hays Daily News in 1970. In addition to these, a number of other dailies figure prominently in the group's history. The Harris group has also previously owned The Olathe News and the Parsons Sun in Kansas; the Camarillo Daily News and the Simi Valley Enterprise in California; and the Spencer Daily News in Iowa.

In 1994, Harris Enterprises purchased assets of a Salina marketing firm and formed a new company, MarketAide Services, Inc. Through MarketAide, the newspapers will be able to offer a wider range of services to advertisers.

In the early 1980s, the Harris Group joined other media organizations, including such giants as Knight-Ridder and Times Mirror, in experimenting with a videotex news service, which was available to personal computers via phone modem. Harris Electronic News was launched in Hutchinson in 1982, then moved to Kansas City the next year. The service offered a varied menu of on-line information, ranging from agricultural and weather data to sports and recipes. As was the case with most early videotex experiments, the size of the subscriber base failed to meet expectations, and the effort was shut down in 1985.

In early 1996, Harris Enterprises launched its Internet research and development project through the Hays Daily News.

On Dec. 1, 2016, GateHouse Media purchased the Harris properties for $20 million.

== Harris publishers at The Hawk Eye ==
During the Harris tenure, Clarence Moody was editor and publisher from 1941 to 1957 when he retired. He was succeeded by Stuart Awbrey.

Weekend publication changed from Saturday to Sunday in 1959. The name, Hawk-Eye Gazette, was shortened to The Hawk-Eye on May 7, 1960, when the first issue was printed in the new building — a converted automobile dealership and bus garage at 800 S. Main St.

In 1965, Stuart Awbrey was succeeded as editor by John McCormally who also shared co-publisher duties with John Bishop. Three years later, Bishop retired and McCormally became editor-publisher. Conversion to offset printing occurred in 1972 at a cost of $800,000. The hyphen was dropped from The Hawk Eye at that time.

In 1979, Awbrey returned to The Hawk Eye as editor-publisher and McCormally became a national correspondent for the Harris News Service. Six years later, Awbrey retired and was replaced by Bill Mertens. After beginning his career as a reporter at The Hawk Eye in 1970, Mertens worked at other Harris Group newspapers prior to assuming editor-publisher responsibilities in 1985.

The Hawk Eye converted from an afternoon to a morning publication November 1, 1993.

In 1997, The Hawk Eye started thehawkeye.com.

Steve Delaney, a former reporter and business editor for The Hawk Eye, assumed the editor-publisher position in 2004 after Mertens died. Prior to his return to The Hawk Eye, he was the editor-publisher of another Harris Group newspaper, The Garden City Telegram in Kansas. Delaney and other department heads were terminated by GateHouse after its acquisition.

== Newspaper contents ==
The newspaper focuses on local issues in Burlington, West Burlington, Des Moines County, southeast Iowa and west-central Illinois. Generally it has three sections each day: news, sports and classified advertising. On Tuesdays, there is a health section called Living Well. A weekend entertainment guide is published on Thursdays. A features section is included Fridays called Currents. A separate Home & Garden, Lifestyles, Business, comics and TV sections is included in the Saturday/Sunday "Weekend Edition" newspaper.

On May 14, 2018, The Hawk Eye dropped its Monday printed edition.

== Reporting about health problems at IAAP ==
In the late 1990s, reporters Dennis J. Carroll and Mike Augspurger wrote a series of stories about health problems experienced by former workers of the Iowa Army Ammunition Plant and its predecessor, the Iowa Ordnance Plant, and their families. The stories helped raise awareness of formerly secret work at the munitions plant carried out by the Atomic Energy Commission. That resulted in the creation of the Burlington Atomic Energy Commission Plant-Former Worker Program, a medical screening program carried out by the University of Iowa's College of Public Health. These articles brought national attention to the case. As a consequence, the Department of Energy released a statement that at one time, nuclear tests were carried out at the Iowa Army Ammunition Plant, and that the plant had stopped manufacturing parts for atomic warheads in 1975.

== Distinctions ==
Tracing its lineage to the Territorial Gazette, The Hawk Eye is the oldest newspaper in Iowa.

The Hawk Eye is credited with giving Iowa its nickname as The Hawkeye State.

One of its associate editors, Robert Jones Burdette, became widely known in the late 19th century as the "Burlington Hawk Eye Man." Burdette joined the paper in 1872 and started writing humorous sketches that were picked up by other newspapers across the country. Collections were published as "Hawkeyetems" (1877), "Hawkeyes" (1879), and "Smiles Yoked with Sighs" (1900). Burdette left The Hawk Eye to join the Brooklyn Daily Eagle in Brooklyn, New York, as its staff humorist. In 1903, Burdette entered the Baptist ministry and became pastor of the Temple Baptist church in Los Angeles, California.

Another of The Hawk Eye's editors, John McCormally, helped the 'Hutchinson News win the Pulitzer Prize for meritorious public service in 1965. As editor of The Hawk Eye, the newspaper three times was named best newspaper in Iowa.

Since its acquisition by GateHouse Media, The Hawk Eye reduced the number of unsigned local editorials to about once a week, generally Sundays. While the paper runs a lead editorial in each issue, nearly all of them are reprinted from other newspapers.

The Hawk Eye's circulation area includes Des Moines, Lee, Henry, Louisa and Van Buren counties in southeast Iowa, and Henderson and Hancock counties in west-central Illinois. County seats in those counties are Burlington, Fort Madison/Keokuk, Mount Pleasant, Wapello, Keosauqua, Oquawka and Carthage, respectively.

=== Gatehouse/Gannett era ===
On Dec. 1, 2016, Gatehouse Media assumed ownership of The Hawk Eye and its sister Harris newspapers. Layoffs began almost immediately and the newspaper had only 12 employees in January 2021 when Gannett (by now the newspaper's owner) put its building at 800 South Main Street. up for sale, according to a Feb. 2, 2021, article in the paper. Printing had been moved out of the building two years previous to Peoria, Illinois. Under both Gatehouse and Gannett ownership, several rounds of staffing cuts were made, particularly to the newsroom and sports staff, the most recent taking place in August 2022 as part of a company-wide elimination of jobs.

On December 1, 2022, the Hawk Eye was acquired by family-owned Burlington Multimedia, LLC, an affiliate company of Mississippi Valley Publishing and Community Media Group. Its new sister newspapers include fellow daily newspapers the Fort Madison Daily Democrat and Keokuk Gate City, plus the Hancock County Journal-Pilot of Carthage, Ill., and shoppers The Bonny Buyer and The Lee County Shopper. Under the new ownership, the Hawk Eye became a five-day-a-week publication, publishing Tuesday through Saturday with Saturdays being a "Weekend Edition."
