= Glebe =

Area of land to support a parish priest

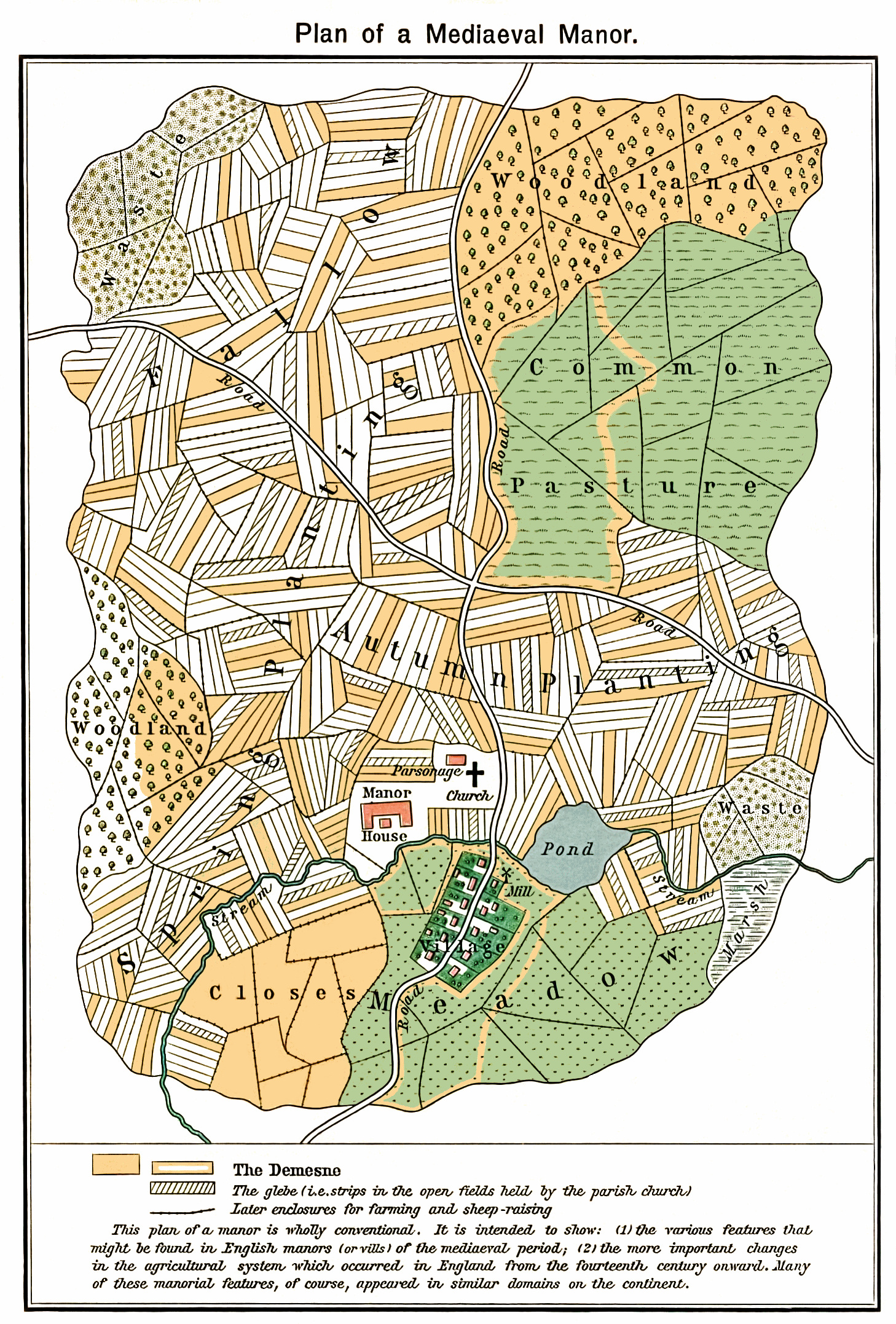
Conjectural map of a medieval manor. The method of "strip farming" was in use under the open field system. The mustard-coloured areas are part of the demesne, the hatched areas part of the glebe. The manor house, residence of the lord, can be seen in the mid-southern part of the manor, near the parish church and parsonage

A glebe (/ɡliːb/, also known as church furlong, rectory manor or parson's close(s)) is an area of land within an ecclesiastical parish used to support a parish priest. The land may be owned by the church, or its profits may be reserved to the church.

== Medieval origins ==
In the Roman Catholic, Anglican and Presbyterian traditions, a glebe is land belonging to a benefice and so by default to its incumbent. In other words, "glebe is land (in addition to or including the parsonage house/rectory and grounds) which was assigned to support the priest".

The word glebe itself comes from Middle English, from the Old French glèbe (originally from Latin: gleba or glaeba, "clod, land, soil").

Glebe land can include strips in the open-field system or portions grouped together into a compact plot of land. In early times, tithes provided the main means of support for the parish clergy, but glebe land was either granted by any lord of the manor of the church's parish (sometimes the manor would have boundaries coterminous with the parish but in most instances it would be smaller), or accumulated from other donations of particular pieces of land. Occasionally all or part of the glebe was appropriated, devoted or assigned to a priory or college. In the case where the whole glebe was given to impropriators they would become the lay rector(s) (plural where the land is now subdivided), in which case the general law of tithes would resume on that land, and in England and Wales chancel repair liability would now apply to the lay rectors just as it had to the rector.

The amount of such land varied from parish to parish, occasionally forming a complete glebe farm. From 1571 onwards, the incumbent of the benefice would record information about the glebe at ecclesiastical visitations in a "glebe terrier" (Latin terra, land). Glebe land could also entail complete farms, individual fields, houses (messuages), mills or works. A holder of a benefice could retain the glebe for his own use, usually for agricultural exploitation, or he could "farm" it (i.e., lease it, a term also used) to others and retain a rent as income.

== Britain ==
=== Church of England ===
Glebe associated with the Church of England ceased to belong to individual incumbents as from 1 April 1978, by virtue of the Endowments and Glebe Measure 1976 (No. 4). It became vested on that date, "without any conveyance or other assurance", in the Diocesan Board of Finance of the diocese to which the benefice owning the glebe belonged, even if the glebe was in another diocese. But see 'Parsonages & Glebe Diocesan Manual 2012' for current legislation.

=== Scotland ===
Glebe land in Scotland was subject to the Church of Scotland (Property and Endowments) Act 1925 (15 & 16 Geo. 5. c. 33), section 30, which meant that it would be transferred little by little to the General Trustees of the Church of Scotland.

== Colonies ==
In Bermuda and some of the Thirteen Colonies where the Church of England was the established church, especially New England, glebe land was distributed by the colonial government and was often farmed or rented out by the church rector to cover living expenses. The Dutch Reformed Church also provided glebes for the benefit of the pastor; it continued this practice through at least the 1850s. In Georgia dissenting ministers were also allocated glebes.

In some cases associations with former glebe properties is retained in the local names, for example: Glebe Road in Arlington County, Virginia, the community of Glebe in Hampshire County, West Virginia, Glebe Mountain in Londonderry, Windham County, Vermont, Glebe Hill, near Tucker's Town, Bermuda, another Glebe Hill in Southampton Parish, Bermuda, and The Glebe Road in Pembroke Parish, Bermuda. Ottawa neighbourhood The Glebe was originally land dedicated to support St Andrew's Presbyterian Church.

Establishments of ministerial support related to land grants later led to hostility against newer congregations in the Northwest Territory like Methodists in Ohio.

== Glebe Act ==
During post-Revolutionary disestablishment, some Virginians sought to confiscate parish lands and glebe property, arguing that these assets had been supported by compulsory taxes under British rule and should therefore be reallocated for a public benefit. On 12 January 1802 they succeeded and the Virginia General Assembly passed the Glebe Act, (Note: An Act concerning the Glebe Lands and Churches Within this Commonwealth.) whereby glebe land could be sold by so-called Overseers of the Poor for the benefit of the indigent in their parish. The Episcopal Church was weakened by the new law, but in the Carolinas the glebes remained in the hands of the church and either were worked by the minister or rented out by them.

== See also ==
- Manse – a dwelling and, historically in ecclesiastical contexts, the amount of land needed to support a single family

== Bibliography ==
- Coredon, Christopher (2007). A Dictionary of Medieval Terms & Phrases (Reprint ed.). Woodbridge: D. S. Brewer. ISBN 978-1-84384-138-8.
- Cross, F. L. (1957). The Oxford Dictionary of the Christian Church. London: Oxford University Press. p. 563.
- Ellis, Franklin (1878). The Reformed Church of Linlithgo Livingston Columbia County New York.
- Heisler, D. Y. (1872). The Fathers of the German Reformed Church in Europe and America. Vol. 3.
- Hey, David (1996). The Oxford Companion to Local and Family History. Oxford: Oxford University Press. p. 204.
- Malden, H. E., ed. (1911). "Parishes: Shalford". A History of the County of Surrey. Vol. 3. London: Victoria County History. pp. 107–111.
- McGurk, J. J. N. (1970). A Dictionary of Medieval Terms: For the Use of History Students. Reigate, UK: Reigate Press for St Mary's College of Education. OCLC 138858.
- Styles, Philip, ed. (1945). "Parishes: Aston Cantlow". A History of the County of Warwick: Volume 3: Barlichway hundred. London: Victoria County History. pp. 31–42.
- "The Glebe of Cumberland Parish". The Southside Messenger. 15 March 2012.
