= Green Mountain Outlook =

- Type: Weekly Newspaper
- Owner: Denton Publications
- Editor: Robert F. Smith and Joe Milliken
- Founded: 2009
- Ceased publication: 2016
- Headquarters: Rutland, Vermont, United States
- Circulation: 20,000

The Green Mountain Outlook was a weekly newspaper in Rutland, Vermont. When the paper was launched, it had an initial weekly circulation of approximately 20,000. The newspaper was owned by Denton Publications, Inc. and published by New Market Press. In 2016, the Green Mountain Outlook merged into the Vermont Eagle.

== History ==
The Green Mountain Outlook was a weekly newspaper was founded in 2009 after the closing of the Message for the Week newspaper.

In 2009, the Message for the Week closed when its parent company, Twin State Valley Media Network, filed for bankruptcy.

A couple of months after the close of the Message for the Week, the former publishers of that paper, Robert F. Smith and Joe Millikin launched a new paper, called the Messenger, published by New Market Press. The Messenger quickly had to change its name to Green Mountain Outlook because of a lawsuit threatened by a Pennsylvanian publishing company, the Sample Media Group, which had been approved by a bankruptcy judge to purchase the assets and planned to relaunch the papers. In a piece published in the Green Mountain Outlook newspaper, editors Robert F. Smith and Joe Millikin said the name change was carried out in an effort to continue "business as usual". According to the newspaper, the name Green Mountain Outlook was chosen to reflect "positive, community oriented publication."

In 2010, the Rutland Tribune, also owned by Denton Publications/New Market Press merged with its sister paper the Green Mountain Outlook. The change was announced by Edward Coats, who was the publisher of New Market Press in Middlebury. The merge with Green Mountain Outlook was intended to have a more expanded free distribution zone that encompassed the greater Rutland region and Windsor counties, as well as the Castleton-Fair Haven-Poultney area. According to Coats, there would aesthetic changes to the paper including colorful new graphics, more photographs and increased news about the community.

In 2016, the Green Mountain Outlook merged into the Vermont Eagle.
