= The Abilene Reflector-Chronicle =

- Type: Daily newspaper
- Publisher: The White Corporation
- Editor: Greg Doering
- Founded: 1942
- Headquarters: 303 S. Broadway St. Abilene, Kansas 67410; United States
- Circulation: 1,348
- Website: abilene-rc.com

The Abilene Reflector-Chronicle is a daily newspaper in Abilene, Kansas, United States. The newspaper also maintains an online presence.

== History ==
It is a union of the Abilene Daily Chronicle (founded 1933) and the Abilene Daily Reflector (founded 1888).

In October 2012, Junction City, Kansas-based Montgomery Communications purchased the Reflector-Chronicle from Cleveland Newspapers of Birmingham, Alabama.

In March 2016, the White Corporation, whose flagship publication is the Emporia Gazette, purchased the Montgomery papers, including the Reflector-Chronicle.

== See also ==
- List of newspapers in Kansas
