= The Daily Union =

Newspaper published in Junction City, Kansas

- Type: Daily newspaper
- Owner(s): Seaton Publishing Co, Inc.
- Founder(s): George W. Kingsbury
- Founded: September 19, 1861; 164 years ago
- Language: English
- City: Junction City, Kansas
- Country: United States
- Circulation: 2,989
- ISSN: 0745-743X
- Website: jcdailyunion.com

The Daily Union is the city newspaper for Junction City, Kansas, United States, and one of the oldest in the state.

== History ==
The paper had its origin in the Smoky Hill and Republican Union which began publishing on September 19, 1861, founded by George W. Kingsbury. The Daily Union in its final incarnation began publishing on June 24, 1896, under the ownership of John Montgomery, E.M. Gilbert, and W.C. Moore.

The paper was locally owned by the Montgomery family from in 1888 to 2016. That year, The White Corporation purchased Montgomery Communications papers.

On May 1, 2018, Seaton Publishing Co, Inc. purchased the Junction City Daily Union and the Flint Hills Shopper.

== See also ==
- List of newspapers in Kansas
