= The Erie Record =

- Type: Weekly newspaper
- Owner: Eddie Hibbs III
- Founder: George McMillen
- Publisher: Eddie Hibbs III
- Founded: 1876 (150 years ago, as The Neosho County Record)
- Language: English
- Circulation: 691
- OCLC number: 12169728
- Website: None

The Erie Record, originally named The Neosho County Record, is a weekly newspaper serving Erie, Kansas and the surrounding Southeast Kansas. It is the newspaper of record of Erie Kansas, and publishes legal notices. It is the second-largest newspaper in Neosho County with a circulation of 691, behind The Chanute Tribune. The newspaper is published on Friday's and is independently owned.

What would become The Erie Record was founded in 1876 by George McMillen and is currently owned by Eddie Hibbs the Third who purchased the paper in late 2013. It is the oldest continuously operated business in Erie.

== History ==
Founded on April 21, 1876, by George McMillen after he bought and moved the Thayer Headlight to Erie. The paper used the name The Erie Headlight until May 5, 1876, when the masthead was officially changed to The Neosho County Record. Later that month a new Thayer Headlight was refounded by C.T Ewing who had founded the first Thayer Headlight originally. On July 22, 1892, the Thayer Headlight stopped publishing when Ewing died, with the last issue simply being a single page only featuring Ewing's obituary. By November 24, 1876, The Erie Record changed from five columns to seven columns. For comparison, the modern New York Times is six columns. On February 8, 1879, McMillen sold The Neosho County Record to a Benjamin Smith.

Benjamin Smith had been born in Philadelphia in 1854, he had previously worked at the Bloomington Democrat in Indiana, and graduated from Indiana State University.

== See also ==
- List of newspapers in Kansas
- Erie
