= Hays Daily News =

Newspaper in Hays, Kansas

The Hays Daily News
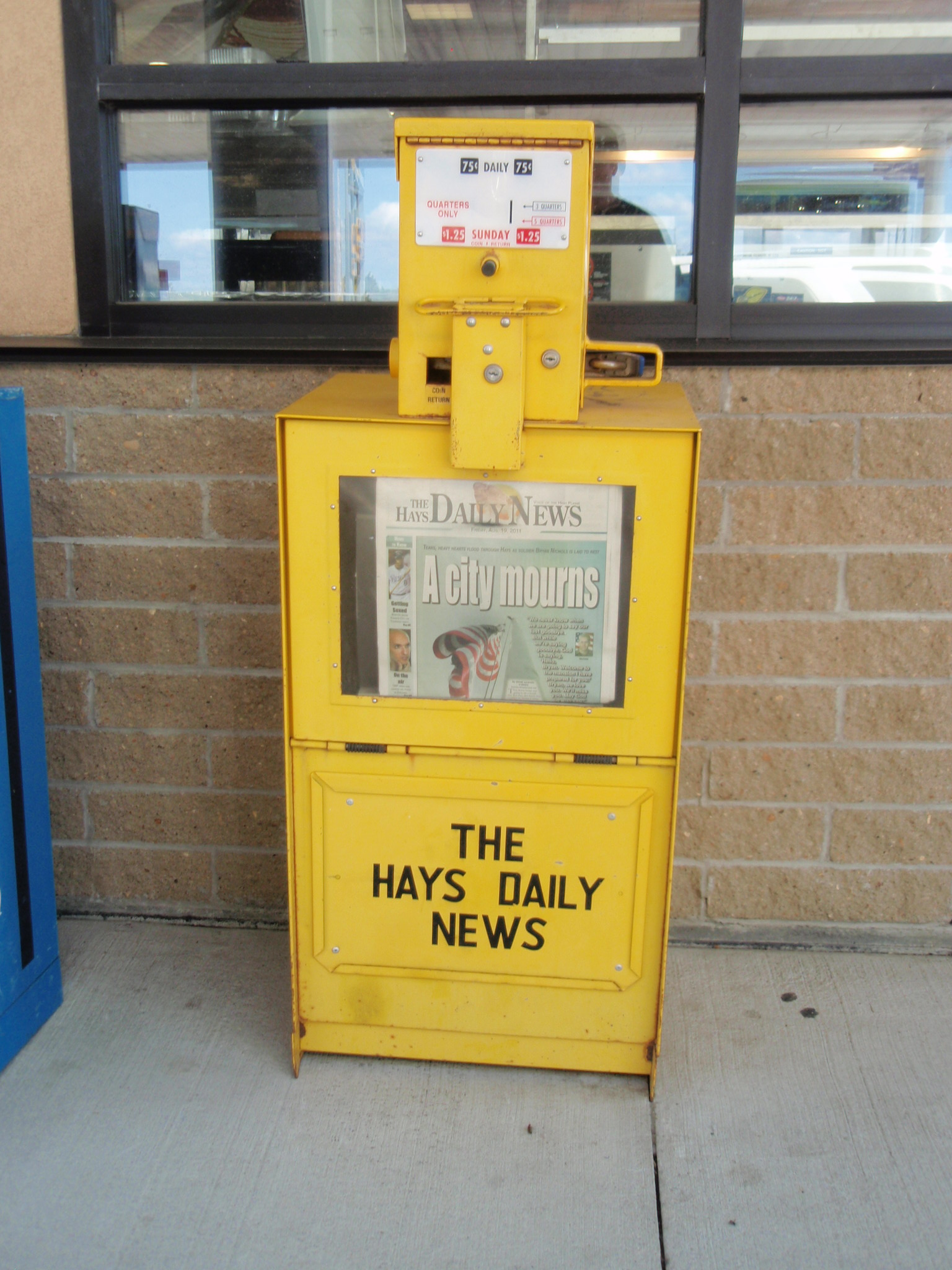
- Hays Daily News vending machine in Oakley, Kansas
- Type: Daily newspaper
- Format: Broadsheet
- Owner(s): CherryRoad Media
- Publisher: Jeremy Gulban
- Editor: Hailey Chapman
- Headquarters: 507 N. Main; Hays, Kansas 67601-0857; United States
- Circulation: 3,887
- Website: hdnews.net

The Hays Daily News is a newspaper that serves western Kansas. The Daily News was published every day except Saturday. The week of March 17, 2024, the newspaper changed publication dates to twice a week on Wednesdays and Saturdays. This followed a reduction several years prior to three days per week (Tuesday, Thursday, and Saturday). In 2011, the paper reported a circulation of 9,644 subscribers.

== History ==
Harris Enterprises, based in Hutchinson, Kansas, purchased the Daily News in 1970. In November 2016, GateHouse Media purchased the Daily News and the other Harris properties for $20 million. In September 2021 "CherryRoad Media" purchased "Hays Daily News" along with 19 other newspapers in 4 different states.

== See also ==
- List of newspapers in Kansas
