= The Emporia News =

19th century Kansas newspaper

The Emporia News was a nineteenth century newspaper in the U.S. state of Kansas. It was founded by Jacob Stotler on August 13, 1859, advocating for Free State politics. It was the town's first newspaper, and was considered a successor to the Kansas News. It claimed political independence, but went on to support the Republican Party. It ceased publication on June 9, 1881. Stotler sold the paper and served as speaker of the Kansas House of Representatives before repurchasing it in 1865.

A retrospective series published in the Emporia Gazette in 2015 concluded that during the country's most tumultuous period (the American Civil War), the News sought to balance local, state, and national news, publishing "tips for farmers, short stories run in installments, recipes, news of neighboring towns, and gossip" alongside complete speeches and correspondence from politicians and generals, fulfilling its responsibility to readers disconnected from the day-to-day experience of the war.

Stotler's son also worked for the News, and went on to have a long career in journalism.

== See also ==
- Emporia Gazette
