= Florida Weekly =

- Type: free weekly newspaper
- Format: tabloid
- Owner: Florida Media Group LLC
- Founder: 2007
- Publisher: J. Pason Gaddis
- Editor: Jeffery Cull
- Language: English
- Headquarters: 4300 Ford Street Ext., Suite 105, Fort Myers, Florida
- Circulation: 92,000
- Website: Official website

Florida Weekly is a newspaper based in Southwest Florida covering Naples, Fort Myers, Bonita Springs, Punta Gorda/Port Charlotte, Palm Beach Gardens and Brevard County. The newspaper is owned by Florida Media Group LLC.
