= Fort Sully (Fort Leavenworth) =

Civil War artillery battery built west of Fort Leavenworth in 1864

Coordinates: 39°22′12″N 94°56′21″W

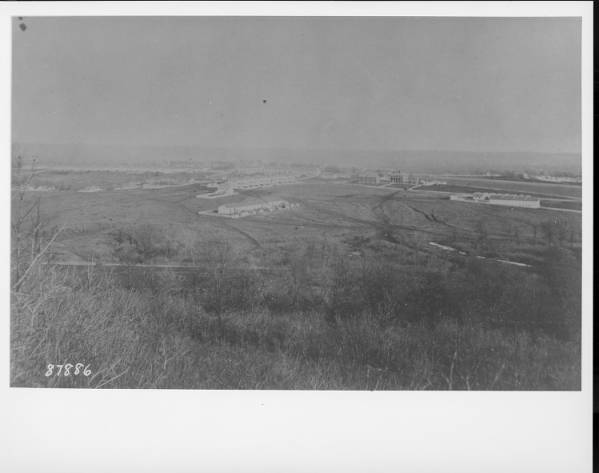
Fort Leavenworth from Fort Sully

Fort Sully was an earthwork artillery battery built during the American Civil War on the plateau of Hancock Hill, the highest hill west of Fort Leavenworth, Kansas, in September and October 1864. Its purpose was to boost the defenses of Fort Leavenworth in case Confederate forces under Maj. Gen. Sterling Price attempted to overrun the area. Price spent all of September and most of October in Missouri on an expedition to occupy that state (see Price's Raid).

Since Fort Sully was part of an existing fort, it was technically termed a battery instead of a fort. It was named for Gen. Alfred Sully, who was stationed at Fort Leavenworth at the outbreak of the Civil War but transferred soon after.

Gen. Thomas Alfred Davies was put in charge of defending Fort Leavenworth. Maj. Franklin E. Hunt was placed in command of the defense of the city of Leavenworth, Kansas. Several earthwork batteries were established overlooking the city of Leavenworth from along the southwestern edge of Fort Leavenworth, as well as in the city of Leavenworth along Michigan Avenue.

Once completed, Fort Sully was a formidable battery. Its occupants and guns could concentrate on any location in the surrounding area. The battery had numerous fortified areas where men, cannons and mortars could be placed. These were not only on the plateau but also along the steep sides of Hancock Hill. The plateau was in the shape of a foot's sole, the widest part being the northern third, which was 100 feet across. The south two-thirds of the plateau ranged from 25 to 75 feet wide. The plateau was approximately 670 feet long from north to south. Many M1819, 24-pounder siege guns were dragged up the steep hill from the armory at Fort Leavenworth and became the main armament of Fort Sully.

It is not known how many troops were stationed at Fort Sully, but it seems throughout its existence, at least some troops were always there. The threat to Fort Leavenworth was eliminated with Price's defeat at Westport, Missouri, on October 23, 1864.

By June 1865 only four men were assigned to Fort Sully. The use of the battery had ended. That month plans were made to take everything from Fort Sully that could be put to use elsewhere at Fort Leavenworth. Since access to the site has always been restricted, the Fort Sully site has remained well preserved to this day.

Today, all that remains of Fort Sully is the crater-like imprint of the earthwork construction. The ruins of the fort can be reached on foot or via horseback by accessing the powerline clearing located behind Stanley Avenue and Fort Leavenworth National Cemetery on Fort Leavenworth, Kansas. On the wooded side of the clearing, a sign indicating the direction of the Heritage Trail can be found. This trail leads to the ruins of the fort. Several historical markers dedicated to the memory of Fort Sully are located around Fort Leavenworth, including at the actual site of Fort Sully, in Fort Leavenworth National Cemetery just below Fort Sully, and at the entrance to the Frontier Military Museum along with two of the M1819, 24-pounder siege guns which were actually emplaced at Fort Sully.
