= Emporia Gazette =

Newspaper in Emporia, Kansas

- Type: Daily newspaper
- Format: Broadsheet
- Owner(s): The White Corporation (Christopher White Walker, Grandson of W.L.W.)
- Publisher: Christopher White Walker
- Editor: Ashley Knecht Walker
- Founded: 1890 (White Family, 1895)
- Headquarters: 517 Merchant Street; Emporia, Kansas 66801
- Circulation: 2,947
- Website: www.emporiagazette.com

The Emporia Gazette is a daily newspaper in Emporia, Kansas.

== History ==
William Allen White bought the newspaper for $3,000 ($116,100 in 2025 dollars) in 1895. Through his editorship, over the next five decades, he became an iconic figure in American journalism and political life. The paper rose to national prominence and influence in the Republican Party following the 1896 publication of "What's the Matter With Kansas?", a White editorial that harshly criticized populism and the Presidential campaign of William Jennings Bryan. White struck up a friendship with US President Theodore Roosevelt who stayed at the White home, called Red Rocks, during cross-country trips.

White won the 1923 Pulitzer Prize for his editorial, "To an Anxious Friend", after he was arrested for a free speech violation of a newly enacted law pushed by Kansas Governor Henry Justin Allen. White's autobiography, published posthumously, won the 1947 Pulitzer Prize.

The newspaper is still published by the White family.

Besides owning The Emporia Gazette, The White family owns The St. Marys Star in St. Marys, Kansas, The Chase County Leader-News in Cottonwood Falls, Kansas, and as of 5 November 2013, The Westmoreland Recorder in Westmoreland, Kansas. The White Corporation added the Junction City Union, The Abilene Reflector-Chronicle and the Wamego Smoke Signal to its newspaper family in March 2016.

== See also ==
- List of newspapers in Kansas
- William Allen White
- William Lindsay White
- The Emporia News, a 19th-century paper published in Emporia, predecessor of the Gazette
