= Current Publishing =

Current Publishing is a publishing company in Southern Maine that was founded by publisher Lee Hews in 2001.

In November 2015, after fourteen years of independent publishing, the company was sold to Sun Media, the local, family-owned publishers of the Weekly Forecaster newspapers, the daily Lewiston Sun Journal, and several other weekly newspapers in the state. During the first year of ownership, the Sun Media team invested heavily in the niche magazine division of Current Publishing and relaunched three of the magazines as full glossy publications: Maine Women Magazine, My Generation, and 95 North.

One year later, two of the most popular Current Publishing newspapers were merged with Forecaster newspapers due to duplication in coverage.

Together, Current Publishing's American Journal & Lakes Region Weekly, along with the four Forecaster editions dominate the Southern Maine market in circulation and local news coverage. The combined weekly circulation is over 100,000 with an 80% penetration in the market.
