= Valley Reporter =

Newspaper published in Vermont, US

- Type: Weekly
- Format: Tabloid
- Editor: Lisa Loomis
- Founded: 1971
- Headquarters: Vermont 100, Waitsfield, VT 05673 United States
- Circulation: 3,700
- Website: https://www.valleyreporter.com/

The Mad River Valley Reporter, usually called Valley Reporter, is a weekly newspaper based in Waitsfield, Vermont that is published every Thursday. The paper covers the Mad River Valley area of central Vermont, including the towns of Waitsfield, Warren, Fayston, Moretown, Duxbury, and the Sugarbush and Mad River Glen ski resort. Its circulation is estimated to be 3,700 copies.

The Valley Reporter began publication in 1971.

The current editor is Lisa Loomis. The publisher is Patricia Clark.

== History ==
The Valley Reporter was originally founded and owned by the Stowe Reporter, which was owned by Trow Elliman. The Valley Reporter began publication in 1971.

In 1976, Valley Reporter editor Phyllis Gile and David Pomerantz left to start a rival paper, after a purported dispute with publisher Elliman. The rival paper, called Green Mountain Independent folded in 1979.

The paper became independent from the Stowe Reporter when Alvan Benjamin purchased the paper from Trow Elliman in 1982. In 1985, Benjamin began purchasing new equipment for the paper, starting with a new typesetter. He hired Lisa Loomis as a reporter for the paper in 1986.

Loomis became editor of the paper in 2000, though Alvan Benjamin retained the title of President of the paper until his death in 2015. Lisa Loomis is also the President of the Vermont Press Association for 2017–2018.

== Coverage ==
Friends of Mad River test the waters of Mad River and publish the results in the Valley Reporter.

== Awards ==
In 1983, the Valley Reporter won first place for business and economic reporting from the New England Press Association.

In 1991, Lisa Loomis, reporter for the Valley, won 3rd place in the category of Best Local Story, Non-daily in the Vermont Press Association Awards Lisa Loomis and Katrina VanTyne won an honorable mention in that same category in 2007.

In 2012, the Valley Reporter won second place in the Best in Vermont—General Excellence (non-dailies) category in the Vermont Press Association Awards.
