= The Anthony Republican =

Newspaper in Anthony, Kansas

Anthony Republican, The
- Type: Weekly newspaper
- Publisher: Larry and Bonnie Dunn
- Editor: Larry Dunn
- Founded: 1865
- Headquarters: 121 E. Main/P O Box 31; Anthony, Kansas 67003; USA
- Circulation: 1,309
- Website: anthonyrepublicannews.com

The Anthony Republican is a local weekly newspaper for Anthony, Kansas with a circulation of about 1,309. The newspaper also maintains an online presence.
