= Vermont Eagle =

Weekly newspaper in Middlebury, Vermont

- Logo
- Type: Weekly Newspaper
- Format: Broadsheet
- Owner: Denton Publications
- Publisher: Denton Publications
- Editor: Lou Varricchio
- Founded: 1999
- Political alignment: Conservative
- Headquarters: 16 Creek Road Suite 5A, Middlebury, VT Addison County United States
- Circulation: 14,464
- Website: https://www.suncommunitynews.com/articles/the-vermont-eagle

The Vermont Eagle is a weekly newspaper based in Middlebury, VT, that serves Addison, southern Chittenden, and northern Rutland counties. The paper is published on Saturdays and has a circulation of 14,464.

The Vermont Eagle is owned by Denton Publications. Lou Varricchio is the current editor. The publication has received several editorial and advertising awards by the Association of Free Community Publications, Inc., based in Liverpool, New York. The newspaper also publishes a free, quarterly color magazine, Our State Vermont. The Eagle ceased publication in October 2021.

== History ==
The paper was established in 1999 as the Addison Eagle. The paper immediately faced startup challenges, as one of its founding partners, Tom Lavoie, was found to have a criminal history. At least one of the investors in the paper, Bernard Rome, a former Republican gubernatorial candidate, asked to have his investment returned. The Eagle, which was framed as a conservative alternative to the other Addison County weekly, the liberal Addison County Independent, had numerous Republican and libertarian investors at the time.

In 2001, the Vermont Eagle was embroiled in a conflict with its competitor newspaper, the Addison County Independent. The editor of the Eagle, Lou Varricchio, took offense at an Addison Independent ad touting its quality and performance as a vehicle for advertising. Varricchio posted an editorial in the Eagle, calling the ad "slick, un-Vermont attack advertising." The Addison Independent's editor, Angelo Lynn, fired back with an editorial criticizing the Eagle for "un-American journalistic practices." Antagonistic editorials continued back-and-forth into the beginning of 2002. Around that time, facing financial troubles, the Eagle announced that it would begin charging readers .50 per copy. But with increased local business advertising support under new management, the Eagle returned to offering the publication without charge. The paper's name was also changed to reflect a wider regional distribution area as readership grew.

In 2003, because of ongoing financial struggles, the Vermont Eagle was purchased by New Market Press. New Market Press was co-founded by Ed Coats and Dan Alexander, who own Denton Publications, which now owns the Vermont Eagle. Denton Publication is considered a sister publication group to the New Market Press.

In 2009, the Vermont Times was absorbed into the Vermont Eagle. In 2016, the Green Mountain Outlook was absorbed into the Vermont Eagle.

Varricchio left the Eagle briefly in 2017 to head up an online outlet called Vermont Watchdog. By April 2017, he had returned to the Eagle, citing re-organizations at the Watchdog.

== Digital Presence ==
The Vermont Eagle maintains an online presence through its distributor The Sun Community News and Printing.
