= Salina Journal =

Newspaper in Salina, Kansas

- Type: Daily newspaper
- Format: Broadsheet
- Owner: USA Today Co.
- Publisher: M. Olaf Frandsen
- Editor-in-chief: Sharon Montague
- Editor: M. Olaf Frandsen
- Deputy editor: Doug Armbruster
- Founded: February 16, 1871
- Language: English
- Headquarters: Salina, Kansas; United States
- Circulation: 20,364
- ISSN: 0745-127X
- Website: salina.com

The Salina Journal is a daily morning newspaper based in Salina, Kansas, United States. It is delivered in north-central and north-western Kansas. Circulation is reported at 20,364 in 2019.

== History ==
The Journal was founded in 1871. It was purchased by Hutchinson, Kansas-based Harris Enterprises in 1949. In November 2016, GateHouse Media purchased the Journal and the five other Harris newspapers.

== 333 Line ==
The 333 Line is a feature of Salina Journal's editorial page. People can telephone their comments which are recorded by automation. Some of these comments appear, verbatim, on the paper's editorial page. In 2004 the Salina Public Library conducted a poll that suggests that the 333 Line is a controversial subject for some members of the community.

== See also ==
- List of newspapers in Kansas
