= The Courtland Journal =

- Irrigation in the heart of the nation
- Type: Weekly newspaper
- Format: 7 column
- Owner(s): Colleen Mainquist
- Publisher: Colleen Mainquist
- Editor: Colleen Mainquist
- Founded: 1903 (as The Comet)
- Headquarters: 420 Main Street; Courtland, KS 66939-0318; USA
- Circulation: 466

The Courtland Journal is a local newspaper in Courtland, Kansas. It is published weekly on Thursdays and reports a circulation of 466. The paper was started under the name The Comet in 1903. It was sold to Francis Borin in 1915 and moved to Courtland where it was renamed The Courtland Journal. It has published continuously ever since.

In the early years of the paper, it was not uncommon for the paper to publish local church information including sermon topics. The paper also published multiple articles of historical value according to the Kansas State Historical Society. At times, articles and letters to the editor are reprinted in other papers such as the Belleville Telescope.
