= Basehor Sentinel =

Newspaper in Kansas, U.S.

The Basehor Sentinel was a local weekly newspaper for Basehor, Kansas. The paper was started and owned by Mike Bell and Paul Massey of Bonner Springs. The newspaper also maintains an online presence.
