= The Southside Messenger =

Local newspaper in Virginia, USA

- Type: Weekly newspaper
- Founded: 2004
- Ceased publication: 2023
- Headquarters: 490 Railroad Ave, Keysville, VA 23947
- Website: southsidemessenger.com

The Southside Messenger was a local newspaper based in Keysville, Virginia, targeting several counties in Southside Virginia, including Charlotte, Lunenburg, and Prince Edward counties.

The paper issued its first copy on June 2, 2004. Since then, the paper has increased in circulation to nearly 3,000, passing several other newspapers in terms of circulation and now employing six people full-time.

The Southside Messenger ceased publication in 2023.
