= Anderson County Advocate =

- Type: Weekly newspaper
- Publisher: Vern Brown
- Editor: Vern Brown
- Headquarters: 117 E. 4th Garnett, Kansas 66032; USA
- Circulation: 1979
- Website: andersoncountydailynews.com

The Anderson County Advocate was a local weekly newspaper for Garnett, Kansas with a circulation of about 2,000. The newspaper maintained an online presence.
