= Montgomery County Chronicle =

Newspaper in Caney, Kansas, U.S.

- Type: Weekly newspaper
- Format: Broadsheet
- Owner(s): Rudy and Kathy Taylor
- Publisher: Taylor Newspaper Family
- Editor: Andy Taylor
- Headquarters: 202 West 4th St; Caney, Kansas 67333; United States
- Circulation: 2,278
- Website: Montgomery County Chronicle

The Montgomery County Chronicle is a local weekly newspaper published each Wednesday for the cities of Caney, Cherryvale, Coffeyville and Independence, Kansas. It is a member of the Kansas Press Association and was formerly published as the Cherryvale Chronicle and as the Caney Chronicle. The Caney Chronicle was established in 1885. The newspaper also maintains an online presence.
