= The Coffeyville Journal =

- Type: Weekly newspaper
- Format: Broadsheet
- Owner(s): Montgomery County Media LLC
- Founded: 1875
- Language: English
- Headquarters: 716 South Maple St. Coffeyville KS, 67337
- Circulation: 1,864
- Website: https://www.coffeyvillejournal.com/

The Coffeyville Journal is a two-day (Wednesday-Saturday) newspaper covering the city of Coffeyville, Kansas with a circulation of approximately 1,800.
