= List of international newspapers originating in the United States =

This list of international newspapers originating in the United States is a list of newspapers as described at newspaper types that are printed in the United States and distributed internationally.

In particular, this list considers a newspaper to be an international newspaper if the newspaper is printed in the United States and distributed in countries other than or in addition to the United States. International newspapers on this list may be repackaged national newspapers or "international editions" of national-scale or large metropolitan newspapers.

== International newspapers ==
- The Christian Science Monitor
- Epoch Times
- The Cambodian Journal
- International New York Times
- The Irish Echo
- The Union Signal
- The Wall Street Journal
- The Wall Street Journal Asia
- The Wall Street Journal Europe
- The Asian Wire
- the East African
