= The De Soto Explorer =

Local newspaper for De Soto, Kansas

The De Soto Explorer is a local newspaper for De Soto, Kansas, United States. The newspaper also maintains an online presence.

== History ==
On January 18, 2012, the newspaper announced the closure of the printing facility and the discontinuation of website updates, effectively closing the company. A press release stated that archives could still be viewed on the website. As of January 18, 2018, archives can no longer be viewed and the homepage of the website is blank. This is likely due to non-payment of the website domain as the website is no longer accessible exactly five years after the newspaper seized.

On January 29, 2013, The De Soto Edge replaced The De Soto Explorer, but is no longer accessible as of 2014. As of 2018, the website domain belongs to a Spanish blog.
