= Garden City Telegram =

Local newspaper for Garden City, Kansas

The Garden City Telegram
- Type: Daily newspaper
- Format: Broadsheet
- Owner: CherryRoad Media
- Publisher: Steve Wade
- Editor: open
- Headquarters: 310 N. 7th Street; Garden City, Kansas 67846; United States
- Circulation: 2,920
- Website: gctelegram.com

The Garden City Telegram is a local newspaper for Garden City, Kansas, published three days a week, Tuesday, Thursday and Saturday.

The Telegram was purchased by Hutchinson, Kansas-based Harris Enterprises in 1953. In November 2016, GateHouse Media purchased the Telegram and the five other Harris newspapers.

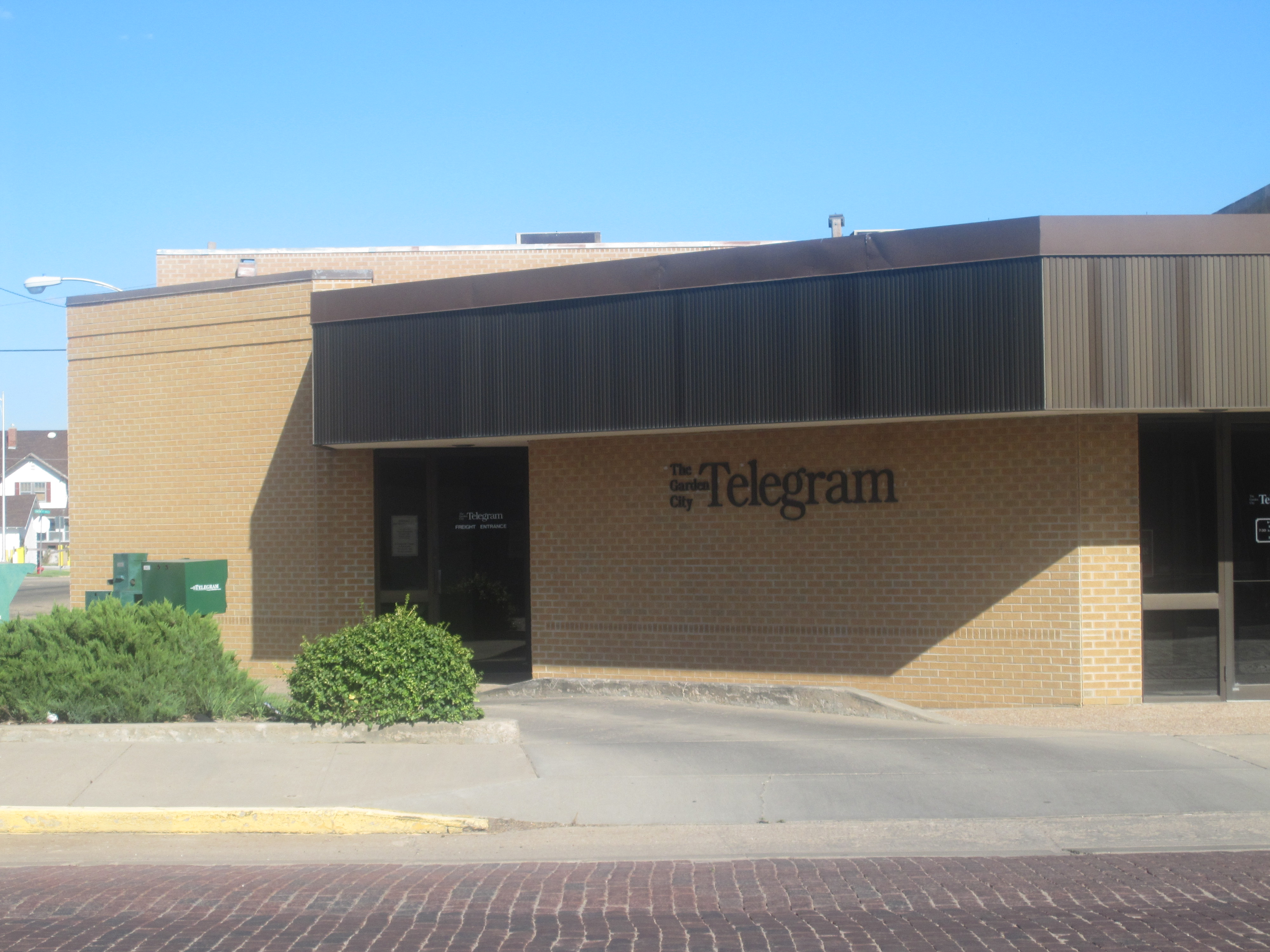
The Garden City Telegram newspaper office (2010). The Telegram has since moved out of this building, which has been purchased by the City of Garden City for use as an auxiliary courthouse.

== See also ==
- Media in Garden City, Kansas
- List of newspapers in Kansas
