= The Fort Leavenworth Lamp =

Newspaper in Kansas, U.S.

Fort Leavenworth Lamp
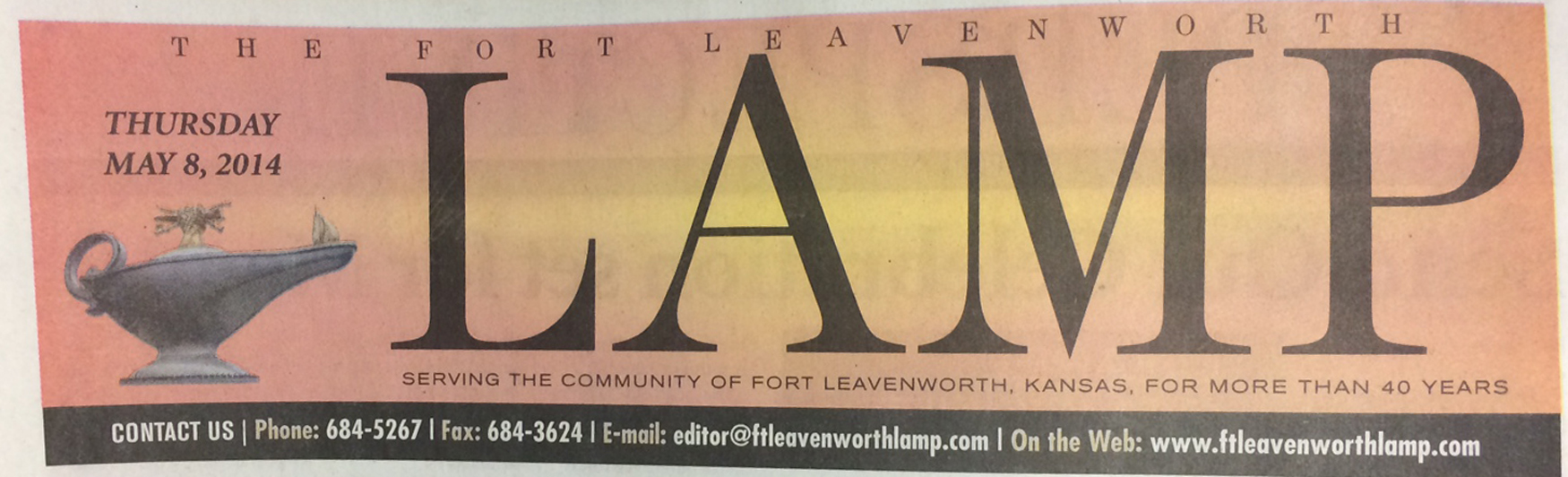
- Type: Digital newspaper
- Owner(s): Fort Leavenworth Garrison Public Affairs Office
- Editor: Prudence Siebert
- Founded: 1971
- Headquarters: 296 Grant Avenue, Fort Leavenworth, Kansas 66027, United States
- Circulation: 6,000 (as of 2023)
- Website: home.army.mil/leavenworth/about/news

The Fort Leavenworth Lamp is a digital newspaper serving the military community living at Fort Leavenworth in Kansas since 1971. It serves as a record for activities on base, including the history of the U.S. Army Command and General Staff College and the U.S. Disciplinary Barracks located on the Army post. It was originally a 20-page tabloid run as a “civilian enterprise." A civilian contractor sold advertisements to cover costs and profit while the fort’s Public Affairs Office provided the paper’s content. The paper's last weekly print edition was published on May 26, 2022, and it has been online-only ever since. In September 2023, ownership was transferred to the base.

== History ==
The first weekly newspaper at the post was The Fort Leavenworth News, which published from 1940 to 1952. The post had no newspaper for the next 18 years until The Lamp was launched on April 8, 1971.

The Lamp was named by Lt. Col. Robert Simpson, a U.S. Army Command and General Staff College instructor, who named the newspaper after the Fort Leavenworth Lamp insignia chosen as the symbol of the Command and General Staff College in 1956. Simpson won a contest to name the newspaper. The other submissions included Sir Echo, Brass Mirror, Fort Leavenworth Dispatch, The Dragoon, Post Parade, Outpost and Dirty Damned Lying Press. In 1991, the paper was renamed to The Fort Leavenworth Lamp to avoid trademark infringement with The Lamp, a publication of the Exxon oil company.

In September 2021, Gannett, formerly GateHouse Media, sold the newspaper to CherryRoad Media. The paper has been online-only since June 2, 2022. In September 2023, ownership of The Fort Leavenworth Lamp was transferred to the base. The newspaper then switched from a civilian enterprise to recreation activity overseen by the base's public affairs office.
