= The Farmville Herald =

Weekly newspaper in Virginia, US

- Honor the past, help for the present, hope for the future
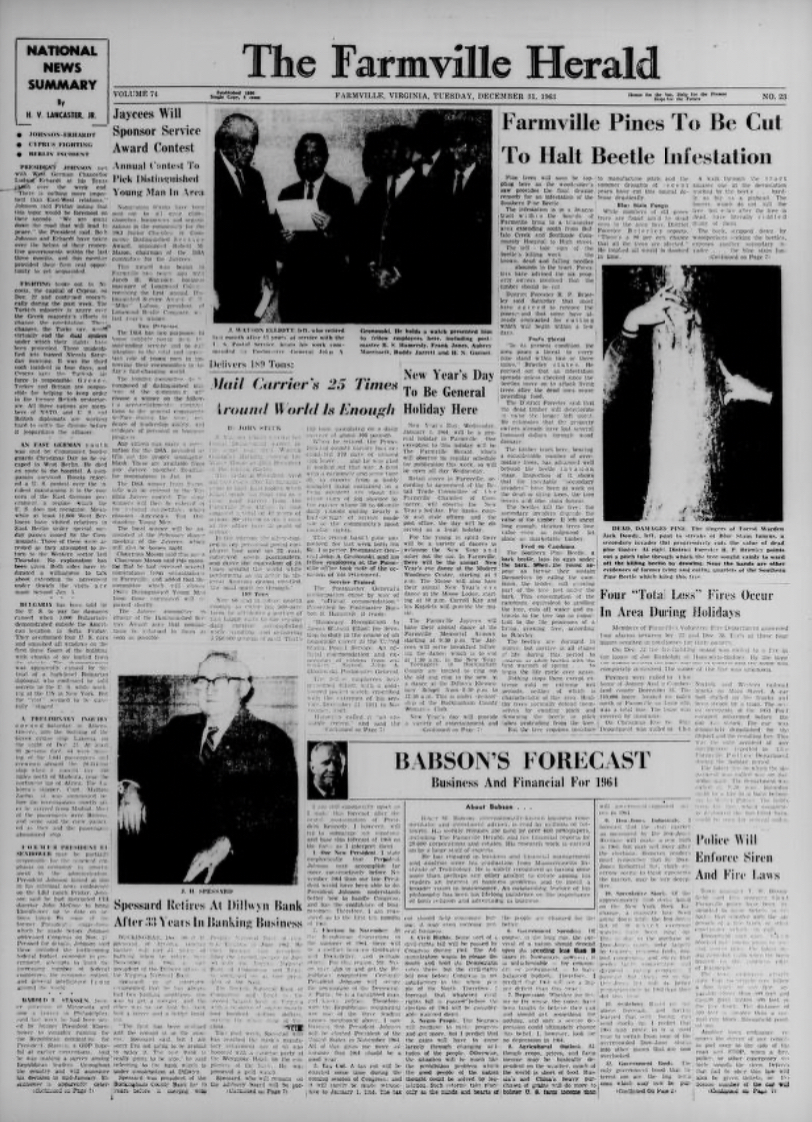
- The Farmville Herald page, December 31, 1963
- Type: Weekly newspaper
- Format: Broadsheet
- Owner(s): Farmville Newsmedia, LLC
- Publisher: Betty Ramsey
- Staff writers: Alexa Massey, Crystal Vandegrift
- Founded: November 21, 1890; 135 years ago
- Language: English
- Headquarters: 114 North Street; Farmville, VA 23901
- Country: United States
- Circulation: 3,797 (as of 2021)
- Website: farmvilleherald.com

The Farmville Herald is a weekly newspaper in Farmville, Virginia, United States. The Farmville Herald is a biweekly newspaper serving Buckingham, Cumberland and Prince Edward counties and the Town of Farmville. It was digitized by Library of Virginia.
