= The Times-Sentinel =

Weekly newspaper in Kansas, USA

- Type: Weekly newspaper
- Publisher: Paul Rhodes
- Editor: Travis Mounts
- Founded: 1993
- Headquarters: 125 N. Main, P.O. Box 544; Cheney, Kansas 67025; USA
- Circulation: 2349
- Website: The Times-Sentinel

The Times-Sentinel is a weekly newspaper that covers four Sedgwick County, Kansas cities: Cheney, Clearwater, Garden Plain and Goddard. It has a circulation of about 2,300.
