= Anderson County Review =

- Type: Weekly newspaper
- Publisher: Dane Hicks
- Editor: Dane Hicks
- Founded: 1865
- Headquarters: 112 W 6th Garnett, Kansas 66032; USA
- Circulation: 2,117
- Website: garnett-ks.com

The Anderson County Review is a local weekly newspaper for Garnett, Kansas with a circulation of about 2,117. The newspaper also maintains an online presence.

== 2020 cartoon controversy ==
In 2020, the newspaper published to its Facebook page a cartoon criticizing Kansas's mask policy against the COVID-19 pandemic in which Democratic Governor Laura Kelly is shown against a backdrop of a Holocaust train with the caption of "Lockdown Laura says: Put on your mask ... and step onto the cattle car," seemingly implying the mask order was a prelude to ethnic cleansing. Kelly was also depicted with a prominent Star of David. The Review and its owner Dane Hicks were criticized for the cartoon by Kelly as well as others for being anti-Semitic and trivializing the Holocaust. Hicks refused to back down or apologize, saying that there was nobody to apologize to and that "Facebook is a cesspool".
