= High Plains Journal =

- A look at the cover of the November 28, 2005 issue that uses the old-style design. A new design was implemented on April 1, 2013.
- Type: Weekly trade newspaper
- Owner(s): High Plains Pub., Inc.
- Founded: 1949; 77 years ago
- Language: English
- City: Dodge City, Kansas
- Country: United States
- Circulation: 30,516
- ISSN: 0018-1471
- Website: hpj.com

High Plains Journal is a regional weekly agricultural news publication published in Dodge City, Kansas with a core circulation reaching twelve states in the Great Plains and Midwest region. As of 2018, it had 42,000 subscribers.

== History and profile ==
The journal was established in 1949 when the Dodge City Journal was renamed High Plains Journal. Each week the publication covers farming and ranching topics with award-winning editorial, up-to-date industry reports, markets, weather, and the largest classified section in the region. The publication devotes issues to certain topical information such as farm and ranch management, seed, cattle feeding, agribusiness and more.

The publication prints five editions to serve farming practices, rather than state lines or other boundaries. The Western Kansas edition, The Eastern Kansas Edition, The Western Plains Edition (serving Colorado, Western Nebraska, and Wyoming), The Southern Plains Edition (serving Oklahoma, Texas, New Mexico, and Arkansas), and Midwest Ag Journal (serving Eastern Nebraska, Missouri, Eastern South Dakota, Minnesota, and Iowa).
