= Ottawa Herald =

Newspaper in Ottawa, Kansas, United States

- Type: Tri-weekly newspaper
- Format: Broadsheet
- Owner: CherryRoad Media
- Publisher: Tommy Felts
- Editor: Doug Carder
- Headquarters: 214 S. Hickory St. Ottawa, Kansas 66067; United States
- Circulation: 2,916
- Website: OttawaHerald.com

The Ottawa Herald is a local newspaper in the town of Ottawa, Kansas.

== History ==
The Ottawa Herald was not the first daily newspaper to be published in Ottawa, Kansas. That honor belongs to The Republican, which was created in 1879, which competed with The Herald until Ralph A. Harris bought and consolidated The Republican into The Herald in 1915.

In 1896, Joseph L. Bristow, who later was elected U.S. senator, and Henry J. Allen, who later became an editor at the Wichita Beacon, Kansas governor, and U.S. senator decided to buy the weekly Evening Ottawa and turn it into a daily newspaper. The Evening Ottawa was free at first, distributed to nearly all of Ottawa, north and south of the Marais des Cygnes River. This was to give the residents of Ottawa a feel for the new newspaper. Then it was made into a subscription for ten cents a week. The newspaper was four pages in a six-column format.

When Bristow and Allen broke up their partnership in 1907, Allen sold it to Ralph A. Harris. Harris was a farmer, banker and assistant postmaster in Franklin County. When he died in 1930, one of his sons, Sidney F. Harris, took over The Herald. Harris' other son, John P. Harris, was an editor at the Chanute Tribune. Members of the Harris family continue in the newspaper business to this day. The Harris Enterprises Inc. is a majority stockholder of the Ottawa Herald, other local newspapers, and small advertising agencies.

In November 2016, GateHouse Media announced it was purchasing the Herald and the other Harris newspapers. In September 2021, the newspaper was sold to CherryRoad Media.

== See also ==
- List of newspapers in Kansas
