= List of newspapers in Arizona =

This is a list of newspapers in Arizona.

== Daily newspapers ==
- Arizona Daily Star – Tucson
- Arizona Daily Sun – Flagstaff
- The Arizona Republic – Phoenix
- Casa Grande Dispatch – Casa Grande
- The Daily Courier – Prescott
- The Daily Territorial – Tucson
- The Kingman Daily Miner – Kingman
- Mohave Valley Daily News – Bullhead City
- Sierra Vista Herald – Sierra Vista
- Today's News-Herald – Lake Havasu City
- Yuma Sun – Yuma

== Weekly newspapers (currently published) ==
- Ahwatukee Foothills News – Ahwatukee
- Ajo Copper News – Ajo
- Arizona Business Gazette – Phoenix
- Arizona Capitol Times – Phoenix
- Arizona City Independent – Arizona City
- Arizona Range News – Willcox
- Arizona Silver Belt – Globe
- Bisbee Observer – Bisbee
- The Buckeye Star – Buckeye
- Camp Verde Bugle – Camp Verde
- The Camp Verde Journal – Camp Verde
- Chino Valley Review – Chino Valley
- Coolidge Examiner – Coolidge
- Copper Basin News – Kearny
- The Copper Era – Safford
- Cottonwood Journal Extra – Phoenix
- Douglas Dispatch – Douglas
- East Valley Tribune – Mesa
- Eastern Arizona Courier – Safford
- Eloy Enterprise – Eloy
- Florence Reminder & Blade-Tribune – Florence
- The Foothills Focus – New River
- Fountain Hills Times – Fountain Hills
- Gila Bend Sun – Gila Bend
- Glendale Star – Glendale
- Grand Canyon News – Grand Canyon
- Green Valley News & Sun – Green Valley
- InMaricopa – Maricopa
- Inside Tucson Business – Tucson
- Jewish News of Greater Phoenix – Phoenix
- Kingman Standard – Kingman
- Lake Powell Chronicle – Page
- Maricopa Monitor – Maricopa, Arizona
- Mountain View News – Sierra Vista
- Navajo-Hopi Observer – Flagstaff
- Navajo Times – Window Rock
- Nogales International – Nogales
- The Northwest Explorer – Tucson
- Parker Pioneer – Parker
- Payson Roundup – Payson
- Peoria Times – Peoria
- Phoenix Business Journal – Phoenix
- Phoenix New Times – Phoenix
- Prescott Valley Tribune – Prescott Valley
- The Record Reporter – Phoenix
- Rim Country Gazette – Payson
- San Carlos Apache Moccasin – Globe
- San Manuel Miner – San Manuel
- San Pedro Valley News-Sun – Benson
- Scottsdale Independent – Scottsdale
- Sedona Red Rock News – Sedona
- Sonoran News – Cave Creek
- Superior Sun – Superior
- The Tombstone News – Tombstone
- The Painted Desert Tribune – Holbrook
- Tucson Weekly – Tucson
- Verde Independent – Cottonwood
- La Voz – Phoenix and Tucson
- The Weekly Bulletin – Sonoita
- West Valley View – Avondale
- White Mountain Independent – Show Low
- The Wickenburg Sun – Wickenburg
- Williams-Grand Canyon News – Williams

== Biweekly newspapers ==
- Arizona Jewish Post – Tucson, Arizona

== Monthly newspapers ==
- Arcadia News – Phoenix
- The Catholic Sun – Phoenix
- Gilbert Independent – Apache Junction
- Catholic Outlook – Tucson
- The Tanque Verde Voice – Tanque Verde, Arizona
- The Tombstone Epitaph – Tombstone
- The Vail Voice – Vail, Arizona
- Valley India Times – (Indo-American Newspaper)
- The Valley Times – Scottsdale

== University newspapers ==
- Arizona Daily Wildcat – University of Arizona
- Pima Post – Pima Community College
- The Lumberjack – Northern Arizona University
- State Press – Arizona State University
- Mesa Legend – Mesa Community College
- Downtown Devil – ASU Downtown

== Defunct ==
- The Buffalo – Fort Huachuca in the 1940s
- 93d Blue Helmet – Fort Huachuca in the 1940s
- Ádahooníłígíí – Navajo Nation in the 1940s and 1950s
- Apache Drum Beat – San Carlos Apache Indian Reservation in the 1960s
- Apache Junction News – Apache Junction
- Apache Sentinel – Fort Huachuca in the 1940s
- The Argus – Holbrook 1890s – 1900s
- Arizona Black Dispatch – Phoenix in the 1970s
- The Arizona Champion – Peach Springs and Flagstaff 1880s – 1890s
- Arizona Citizen – Tucson 1870s – 1880s See also: Arizona Weekly Citizen, Tucson Citizen, Arizona Daily Citizen.
- Arizona Copper Camp – Ray in the 1910s and 1920s
- Arizona Daily Citizen – Tucson 1880s – 1900s See also: Arizona Citizen, Tucson Citizen, Arizona Weekly Citizen.
- The Arizona Daily Orb – Bisbee 1890s – 1900s
- The Arizona Gleam – Phoenix in the 1920s and 1930s
- The Arizona Kicker – Tombstone
- Arizona Miner – Prescott See also Arizona Weekly Journal-Miner, Arizona Weekly Miner.
- Arizona Sentinel – Yuma 1910s See also:The Arizona Sentinel,Yuma Sun, Arizona Sentinel and Weekly Yuma Examiner, Arizona Sentinel Yuma Southwest.
- The Arizona Sentinel – Yuma 1870s – 1910s See also:Arizona Sentinel,Yuma Sun, Arizona Sentinel and Weekly Yuma Examiner, Arizona Sentinel Yuma Southwest.
- Arizona State Miner – Randsburg, California and Wickenburg 1890s – 1920s
- Arizona Sun – Phoenix 1940s – 1960s
- The Arizona Times – Tucson in the 1920s and 1930s
- Arizona Tribune – Phoenix 1950s – 1970s
- Arizona Weekly Citizen – Tucson 1880s – 1890s See also: Arizona Citizen, Tucson Citizen, Arizona Daily Citizen.
- Arizona Weekly Enterprise – Florence 1880s – 1890s
- Arizona Weekly Journal-Miner – Prescott See also: Arizona Miner, Arizona Weekly Miner.
- Arizona Weekly Miner – Prescott See also: Arizona Miner, Arizona Weekly Journal-Miner.
- Arizona Weekly Republican – Phoenix in the 1890s List of newspapers in Arizona
- Arizona's Negro Journal – Tucson in the 1940s
- The Arizonian (newspaper) – Scottsdale in the 1950s and 1960s
- Bisbee Daily Review (Bisbee, Arizona) (1901–1971)
- The Bachelor's Beat
- The Border Vidette (Nogales, Arizona) (1894-1934)
- Buckeye Valley News – Buckeye
- Bullhead City Bee – Bullhead City
- The Copper Era and Morenci Leader – Clifton, Arizona
- El Fronterizo (Tucson) (1878-193?)
- The Holbrook News (Holbrook, Arizona)
- Mohave County Miner (Mineral Park, Arizona, 1882-1887; Kingman, Arizona, 1887-1974), called Mohave County Miner and Our Mineral Wealth between 1918 (after merger with Our Mineral Wealth) and 1922.
- Our Mineral Wealth (Kingman, Arizona, 1893-1918), merged with Mohave County Miner in 1918.
- Phoenix Gazette (1881–1997)
- Prensa Mexicana – Tucson, Arizona in the 1950s
- The Rep
- Salt River Herald - Phoenix, Arizona 1878-1879 The St. Johns Herald (1885-1903, 1917-1938), Snips and St. Johns Herald (1903-1905), St. Johns Herald and Apache News (1905-1917), St. Johns Herald-Observer (1938-1946), Apache County Independent-News and Herald-Observer (1946-1956)
- Swansea Times – Swansea
- Tombstone Citizen – Tombstone, Arizona
- The Tucson Citizen – Tucson (1870–2009)
- Weekly Arizonian
- The Winslow Mail – Winslow

== See also ==
Comprehensive

- Lists of newspapers
- List of newspapers in the United States

Frequency

- List of free daily newspapers in the United States
- List of weekly newspapers in the United States

Circulation

- List of international newspapers originating in the United States
- List of national newspapers in the United States
- List of newspapers in the United States by circulation

Foreign language

- List of French-language newspapers published in the United States
- List of German-language newspapers published in the United States
- List of Spanish-language newspapers published in the United States

Specialty

- List of African-American newspapers in the United States
- List of alternative weekly newspapers in the United States
- List of business newspapers in the United States
- List of family-owned newspapers in the United States
- List of Jewish newspapers in the United States
- List of LGBTQ periodicals in the United States
- List of student newspapers in the United States
- List of supermarket tabloids in the United States
- List of underground press in the United States

Other

- List of defunct newspapers of the United States
