= W. B. Kelly =

American politician from Arizona

Member of the Arizona Senate from the Graham County district
- In office January 1937 – December 1938
- Preceded by: Aaron Nelson
- Succeeded by: Benjamin Blake
- In office January 1931 – December 1934
- Preceded by: Thomas S. Kimball
- Succeeded by: Aaron Nelson

Personal details
- Born: December 7, 1875 Poplar Bluff, Missouri
- Died: February 14, 1948 (aged 72) Tucson, Arizona
- Party: Democratic
- Spouse: Ruth Guernsey
- Children: Sam, William H., Mildred, Alice
- Profession: Politician

W. B. Kelly (last name sometimes spelled Kelley), was an American politician from Arizona. He served three terms in the Arizona State Senate during the 10th, 11th, and 12th Arizona State Legislatures, holding the seat from Graham County. He was a pioneer newspaper man in Arizona, owning and editing several newspapers, including the Arizona Daily Star, Bisbee Daily Review (which he originated), and the Graham Guardian.

== Biography ==
Kelly was born on December 7, 1875, in Poplar Bluff, Missouri, son of George H. and Helen Kelly. The family moved to Austin, Texas in 1881, and then moved on to Clifton, Arizona in 1885, and then Tucson the following year. In 1890 they moved to Solomonville, where George purchased the local paper, The Solomonville Bulletin. By 1898 he was working for his father at the Solomonville Bulletin. He also married that same year, on February 22, to Ruth Guernsey. Their children included William Henderson Kelly, who also became a newspaperman and later a noted anthropologist of the American Southwest.

In 1901, Kelly was living in Bisbee, and he began the Cochise Review, which would become the Bisbee Daily Review. He remained with the Review through 1907, but in 1908 was working for the Kelly Print and Publishing Company, owned by him and his father, George Kelly, and had moved to Tucson. Kelly Print owned newspapers in Tucson, Phoenix, Globe, and Tombstone. The other papers were the Douglas Daily International, Arizona Daily Star, Arizona Democrat, and the Prescott Evening Courier. In 1911, Kelly moved to Clifton, Arizona and purchased The Copper Era, which he merged with the Morenci Leader and changed the title of the paper to The Copper Era and Morenci Leader. From 1914 to 1918 Kelly was the U. S. postmaster at Clifton, Arizona.

In 1930, Kelly ran for and won the Arizona State Senate for the single seat from Graham County. He ran for re-election in 1932 and won. He chose not to try for re-election again in 1934, instead challenging incumbent James H. Kerby in the Democrat primary for Arizona Secretary of State, but was defeated in a five-man race, coming in second. In 1938 Kelly once again ran for the State Senate. He was unopposed in both the Democrat primary and the general election in November. He did not run for re-election in 1940, instead joining Governor Robert Taylor Jones' staff in 1939 as his executive secretary.

Kelly sold the Graham Guardian in 1943 to the Gila Printing and Publishing Company, a newly formed company. In January 1944, Kelly sold The Copper Era, the last of his paper interests. Kelly died on February 14, 1948, in the Elks State Hospital in Tucson. He had come to the hospital in ill health the prior week.
