= Holbrook Argus =

Defunct newspaper in Holbrook, Arizona

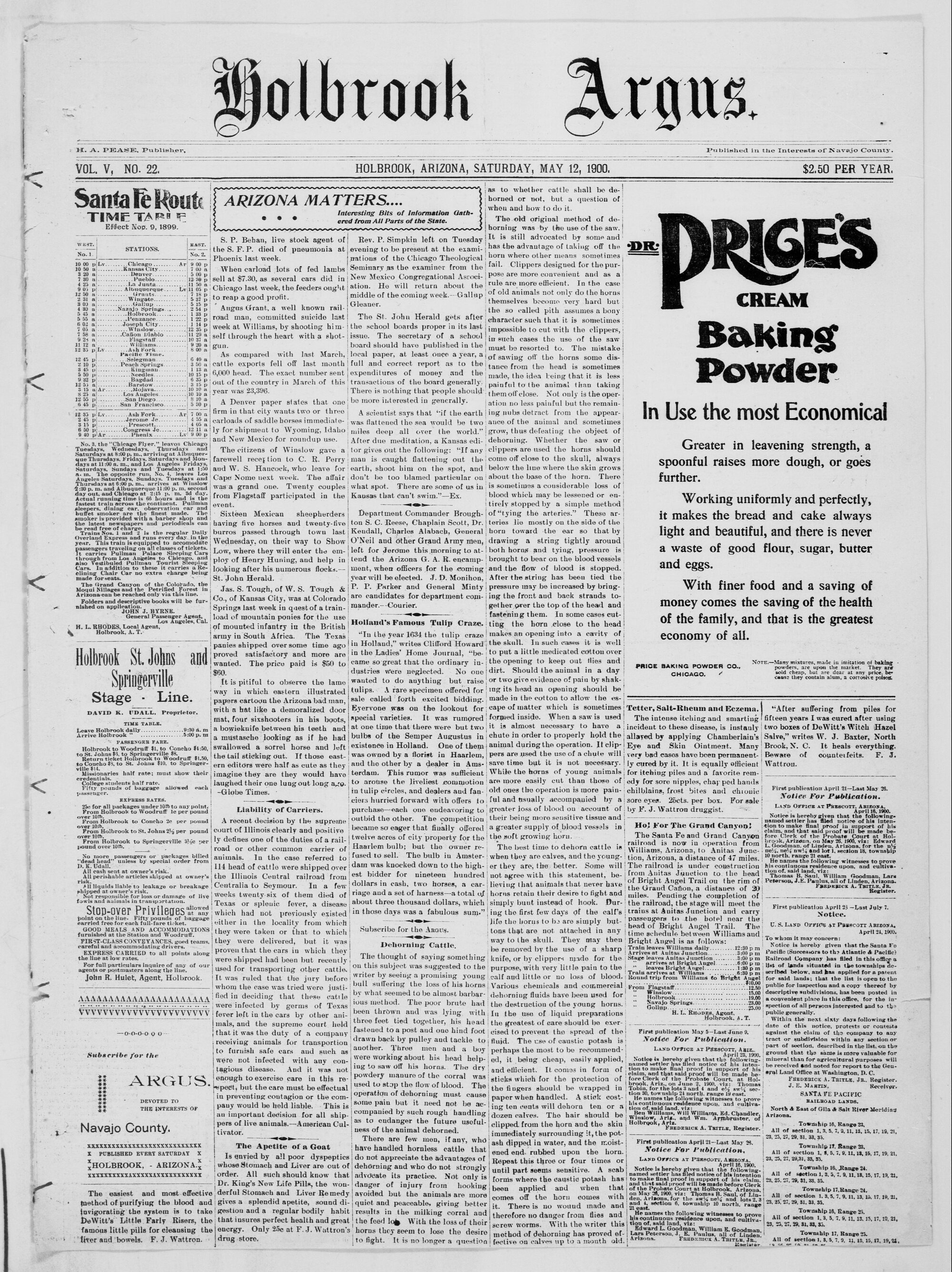
- Front page of the May 12, 1900 issue of the Holbrook Argus
- Format: Weekly newspaper
- Founder: Albert Franklin Banta
- Founded: December 12, 1895
- Ceased publication: February 4, 1913
- Political alignment: Democratic (1895-1896 and 1906-1913); Republican (1896-1906)
- Language: English
- City: Holbrook, Arizona
- Country: United States
- ISSN: 2375-172X
- OCLC number: 25085650

The Holbrook Argus was a weekly newspaper published in Holbrook, Arizona from 1895 until 1913. Founded by Albert Franklin Banta, the first issue was published on December 12, 1895, as The Argus, the paper changed its name to the Holbrook Argus on May 12, 1900, which remained its name until its run ended in 1913.

== History ==
The Holbrook Argus was founded as The Argus on December 12, 1895 by Albert Franklin Banta in Holbrook, Arizona. The Argus supported the Democratic Party. Banta, who worked with other newspapers based in Holbrook, was The Argus's first editor and held this position from December 12, 1895 to August 1, 1896.

Banta was succeeded by J. E. DeRosear, who was editor from August 8, 1896 to November 7 of the same year. In 1896, under DeRosear's editorship, the Argus converted to the Republican Party.

Christian O. Anderson, a schoolteacher and principal, succeeded DeRosear and was editor from November 10, 1896 until he left the position on April 28, 1900 to move to Willcox, Arizona and purchase the Arizona Range News.

H. A. Pease was editor from May 5, 1900 to January 1903. On May 12, 1900, The Argus changed its name to the Holbrook Argus.

L. D. and J. H. Divelbess were jointly editors from February 7, 1903 to 1906. In 1906, under their editorship, the Holbrook Argus returned to supporting the Democratic Party.

Lloyd C. Henning became editor in 1907. In October 1909, Henning sold the Holbrook Argus, along with The Winslow Mail, another newspaper he was in charge of, to John F. Bauer, a newspaper publisher in Arizona and Henning's business partner. Henning remained editor of the Holbrook Argus.

== Works cited ==
- Lutrell, Estelle (1949). "Newspapers and periodicals of Arizona, 1859-1911". archive.library.nau.edu.
- McClintock, J. H. (1916). Arizona, Prehistoric, Aboriginal, Pioneer, Modern.
