= Wick Communications =

American media company

- Type: Private
- Industry: Newspapers
- Founded: July 30, 1984
- Founder: Milton I. Wick and his James L. Wick
- Headquarters: Sierra Vista, Arizona, U.S.
- Key people: Francis Wick, President and CEO; Susan Ellis, CFO; John D'Orlando, COO; Reilly Kneedler, CoS
- Number of employees: 400+
- Website: wickcommunications.com

Wick Communications (formerly known as Wick Newspaper Group) is a family-owned media company with 18 newspapers in 3 states. It also publishes websites and other specialty publications. The home offices are in Sierra Vista, Arizona, and it has newspapers in Arizona, Oregon and Washington.

== The Wick family ==
While in college, brothers Milton I. Wick and James Lester Wick started a business employing college students to sell books to farmers during the summer months. The two purchased their first newspaper in 1926. Over the years Milton managed the business and acquired 27 papers across the country. At the same time his business partner James worked as a foreign correspondent in Europe and focused on politics. After returning stateside he became editor of the newsletter What's Happening in Washington. In 1952, James published a book titled "How Not to Run for President, A Handbook for Republicans."

In 1953, James organized a European tour with a group of 37 newspaper editors, including his brother. The venture was called Wick Editors Tours. The group were the first Americans to enter and report from Hungry and Romania after the raising of the Iron Curtain. The Wick brothers were among the first party of U.S. journalists allowed inside the Soviet Union after the death of Joseph Stalin. At the time of his death in 1964, James was the editor and publisher of Human Events, a Conservative newsletter. Right before passing, he sold his interest in Wick Newspapers to his brother Milton's sons Walter M. Wick and Robert J. Wick. The two took full ownership of the family business when their father Milton died on November 30, 1981. At that time the Wick Newspaper Group owned and operated 40 newspapers.

Milton I. Wick was inducted posthumously into the Arizona Newspapers Hall of Fame in 1996, and Walt M. Wick and Robert J. Wick were also inducted in September 2004.

In 2016, Robert's son Francis Wick was named CEO of Wick Communications. That same year Walter M. Wick died of pancreatic cancer. Robert J. Wick died in 2022. In August 2024, Francis Wick announced he will step down as company CEO. He was replaced by Josh O'Connor, an executive with Black Press.

== Acquisitions and sales ==
The company originated in 1926 when the Wick family purchased the Niles Daily Times in Niles, Ohio. The company bought The Daily Herald in 1947, and Williston Herald in 1961. Also in 1961, the Wick sold the Niles Daily Times and three nearby newspapers (the Girard News, the Hubbard News and the Suburban Reporter) to a newly formed enterprise. In 1962, Wick purchased a stake in the Sidney Herald.

The Wicks acquired the Sierra Vista Herald in 1967, the Argus Observer in 1968, Bisbee Review in 1974 and Green Valley News in 1978, Arizona Range News in 1981, Eastern Arizona Courier in 1983, KFMM and KCUZ in 1983, the Parker Pioneer in 1985, the L'Observateur in 1986, Half Moon Bay Review in 1986, Ojai Valley News in 1987, Richland County Leader in 1988, Douglas Daily Dispatch in 1989; The Daily Territorial, The Weekly Territorial and Ore Valley Territorial in 1990, Inside Tucson Business in 1992, Mat-Su Valley Frontiersman in 1996, Montrose Daily Press in 1997, Tucson Weekly in 2000, Capital Journal in 2005; and Anchorage Press in 2006.

Wick sold the LaPlace L'Observateur and Bogalusa Daily News in April 2014 to Carpenter Media Group, a division of Boone Newspapers. That same month, Wick sold the Tucson Weekly and Inside Tucson Business to 10/13 Communications. In January 2018, Wick sold The Daily Herald to Paxton Media Group and also sold the Half Moon Bay Review in May 2018. The company purchased The Wenatchee World in March 2018 Acadiana LifeStyle in July 2018, Delta County Independent in Colorado in May 2019 and The Daily Journal in June 2019. The company closed the Independent-Enterprise of Payette, Idaho in 2020.

Wick purchased the Madison Daily Leader in South Dakota in March 2021. In September 2023, Wick bought the Arizona Daily Sun from Lee Enterprises. In April 2024, Wick Communications sold The Daily Iberian and Acadian LifeStyle to Carpenter Media Group. In October 2024, the company purchased the television station, NCWLife channel.

Wick sold seven newspapers to Forum Communications Company in January 2026. The deal included The Daily Journal in Minnesota; Wahpeton Daily News, Hankinson News Monitor and Williston Herald in North Dakota; Capital Journal and Madison Daily Leader in South Dakota; and Sidney Herald in Montana. In March 2026, the company sold the Delta County Independent and Montrose Daily Press in Colorado to the Seaton Publishing Company. In May 2025, the Mat-Su Valley Frontiersman and Anchorage Press were sold to the Mat-Su Sentinel. In October 2026, Wick acquired the Sedona Red Rock News and the Camp Verde Journal.

== River City Newspapers ==
River City Newspapers, LLC is a joint venture between Wick Communications and Western News & Info. It was established in August 1995 to manage the Today's News-Herald, a newspaper based in Lake Havasu City, Arizona formed from the merger of Wick's Daily Herald and Western's Today's Daily News. Wick also transferred ownership of the Parker Pioneer over to River City.

In 2022, River City purchased the Mohave Valley Daily News, Wickenburg Sun, Laughlin Times and Needles Desert Star from Brehm Communications. Also, River City acquired The Kingman Daily Miner and the Central Printing Facility in Golden Valley, Arizona from Western News&Info. In 2026, River City acquired the Williams-Grand Canyon News, Verde Independent, Camp Verde Bugle and Navajo-Hopi Observer from Western News&Info.

== Newspapers ==
| State | City | Newspaper |
|---|---|---|
| Arizona | Flagstaff | Arizona Daily Sun |
| Arizona | Willcox | Arizona Range News |
| Arizona | Bisbee | Bisbee Review |
| Arizona | Sonoita | The Weekly Bulletin |
| Arizona | Camp Verde | Camp Verde Journal |
| Arizona | Clifton | Copper Era |
| Arizona | Douglas | Douglas Dispatch |
| Arizona | Safford | Eastern Arizona Courier |
| Arizona | Green Valley | Green Valley News & Sun |
| Arizona | Nogales | Nogales International |
| Arizona | Benson | San Pedro Valley News-Sun |
| Arizona | Sahuarita | Sahuarita Sun |
| Arizona | Sedona | Sedona Red Rock News |
| Arizona | Sierra Vista | Herald Review Media |
| Arizona | Tucson | The Daily Territorial |
| Oregon | Ontario | Argus Observer |
| Washington | Wenatchee | The Wenatchee World |
