= Boxfire Press =

American science fiction/fantasy publisher

- Parent company: Boxfire, LLC
- Founded: 2010
- Country of origin: United States
- Headquarters location: Washington, D.C.
- Distribution: Worldwide
- Publication types: E-books and books
- Fiction genres: Science fiction, Superhero, Mystery, Fantasy
- Imprints: ca.lamito.us
- No. of employees: 3
- Official website: boxfirepress.com

Boxfire Press is an American science fiction and fantasy publisher based in Washington, D.C.

From 2009 to early 2012, most of Boxfire's publications were short e-books. One 2010 example was Kuro Crow, an e-book of three short stories by San Diego CityBeat writer Dave Maass.

In May 2012, Boxfire Press announced it would stop selling individual short stories and instead offer them for free download in a shift toward long-form novels and anthologies. Instead, each month, a new short story would be made available to Boxfire Press' Storyed members.

== Published works ==
Full-length works

- McLachlan, Justin (1 March 2012). Star. Boxfire Press. ISBN 978-0983986126.
- Goldsmith, Kris, ed. (30 November 2011). Red: Several Marvelous, Sensational, Absurd, Visionary, Peculiar, Unthinkable, Wicked and Totally Untrue Stories. Boxfire Press. ISBN 978-0983986102.
- McLachlan, Justin (8 August 2011). Time Up. Boxfire Press. ISBN 978-0982767511.
- McLachlan, Justin (23 April 2013). Treknology. Boxfire Press. ISBN 978-1938191022.
- Lindemoen, Shane (8 August 2013). Artifact (Gold, 2014 Independent Book Awards). Boxfire Press. ISBN 978-1938191053.
- Gale, Rebecca (10 December 2012). Trying. Box Fire Press. ISBN 978-1938191909.
- Thomas, Matt (14 March 2013). A Breach In Death. Boxfire Press. ISBN 978-1938191015.
- McLachlan, Justin (1 February 2013). This Time Around.
- Milbrodt, Teresa (1 September 2013). The Patron Saint of Unattractive People.
- McCaffrey, John (10 October 2013). The Book of Ash.

Short works

- Thomas, Matt (25 January 2012). Happiness USA. ASIN B00721EY1Q.
- Pacheco, Michael M. (28 December 2011). Harmonic Signs. ASIN B006R0ITVE.
- Thomas, Matt (26 September 2011). Resetting the Armageddon Clock. ASIN B005PZ94SY.
- Lewis, Jason T. (21 September 2011). Heroic Measures. ASIN B005OS3BZ4.
- McLachlan, Justin (22 March 2011). Where Doubt Remains. ISBN 978-0982767504.
- Maass, Dave (2 December 2010). Kuro Crow. ISBN 978-0982767566.
- Fitzgerald, L. G. (16 November 2010). Sic Transit Gravitas. ISBN 978-0982767542.
- O'Connor, Shauna (12 November 2010). Curtains. ISBN 978-0982767559.
- McLachlan, Justin (25 September 2010). Sitting for the Superkids. ISBN 978-0982767528.
- Scott, J. Allen (20 August 2010). Fear of Flying. ASIN B00486U5T8.
- McLachlan, Justin (15 February 2010). Kurt: Thought Patterns. ASIN B0038M2LKY.
- McLachlan, Justin (19 August 2009). Ian: Next Year. ISBN 978-1452438511.
