= Anarchestra =

- Website: www.anarchestra.org

Anarchestra is a collection of approximately 200 musical instruments (as well as a collection of works composed for them) built by the musician, composer, and music theorist Andy Thurlow between 2000 and 2020. The instruments were designed to be outside the norm of traditional Western instruments, with the explicit goal of opening the practice of music up to a wider audience. Many of the instruments are not tuned to the equal temperament system in order to allow musicians to produce pitches outside the range of traditional Western instruments. The Tucson Weekly described the instruments as "19th century industrial meets ancient folk instrumentation and punk-rock DIY frugality, and lots of childlike whimsy. Some creations recall instrument maker Harry Partch (who also composed), but are far more Road Warrior-esque. Some have familiar tones, but many do not, and there's a wealth in textures and tunings. All reflect the man's [Thurlow's] life, world and philosophies." The collection is based in Tucson, where it has been part of several arts events and festivals.

Much of the project's philosophy is reflected in its name, which is a portmanteau of "anarchy" and "orchestra". Anarchy, in this sense, means the absence of any central authority or hierarchy; that all participants in the musical experience of Anarchestra should have equal opportunity to join in both aesthetic critique and musical performance.

In addition to the instruments and the works composed for them, Anarchestra is the thousands of people who play and have played the instruments. Consistent with the underlying philosophy of the project, all Anarchestra presentations and performances do not draw a line between the audience and the performers. Attendees are free to participate in making music with the instruments to whatever degree they wish.
