= Lake Powell Chronicle =

Newspaper in Page, Arizona

- Type: Weekly newspaper
- Owner: O’Rourke Media Group
- Founded: August 11, 1965
- Language: English
- Headquarters: Page, Arizona
- Circulation: 1,313 (as of 2022)
- Website: lakepowellchronicle.com

The Lake Powell Chronicle is a weekly newspaper in Page, Arizona, United States.

== History ==
In August 1965, a corporation called Lake Powell Enterprises was formed to purchase the radio station KPGE and launch a newspaper called the Lake Powell Chronicle, which would be freely mailed to residents of Page, Arizona. A month prior another paper called the Page News ceased. Royce Knight was named president of the new company.

The paper was acquired by Dennis Lippert in April 1966, Errol G. Brown, former owner of the Southern Utah News, in February 1968, Jake E. Highers and James D. "Jim" Stubbs in December 1968. In June 1978, the paper added a second weekly edition.

In November 1981, Stubbs launched the Navajo-Hopi Observer, expanding his chain to six papers. In February 1983, Stubbs sold his six papers to Western Newspapers. The Chronicle was purchased by Mike and Pat Lindsey in May 1988, followed by Ron and Jeanette Rieb in June 1989. At that time it's circulation was 3,000.

By 2005, News Media Corporation owned the Chronicle. The company closed the paper in 2025. It was then sold to and revived by O’Rourke Media Group.
