= John F. Brown =

John F. Brown may refer to:

- John Brown (Seminole chief) (1842–1919), Seminole Chief and Confederate Army officer
- J. F. Brown (1877–1950), Arizona rancher and politician
