= Kelly Davis (reporter) =

American journalist

- Born: March 17, 1973
- Died: July 1, 2026 (aged 53); San Diego, California
- Occupation: Investigative reporter
- Known for: Launching of San Diego CityBeat

Kelly Lynn Davis was a journalist and investigative reporter from San Diego, California.

== Career ==
Davis helped launch San Diego CityBeat in 2002 with David Rolland and was one of the main editors. In March 2015, Davis left Southland Publishing, Inc, the publisher of San Diego CityBeat. After leaving CityBeat, Davis became a freelance writer. In May 2020, Davis joined The Appeal as a senior editor. Davis has covered California laws about sex offenders, and has investigated San Diego's homeless situation.

Davis was named Journalist of the Year by the San Diego Pro Chapter of Society of Professional Journalists in 2023.

=== Inmate deaths ===
Davis and Dave Maass released a 5-part investigative series starting in 2013 in San Diego CityBeat about inmates dying in San Diego jails at the highest rates in the state, many of which were preventable deaths. This series won investigative awards and resulted in new policies and training to reduce suicides. In 2014, after the series had received widespread media attention, an inmate hanged himself while imprisoned and his widow sued San Diego county for negligence. In 2017, San Diego county claimed they didn't know about any problems with inmate deaths despite the widespread media coverage, and demanded that Davis provide her private investigative "notes, interviews and recordings" to help in San Diego's case against the widow. Davis refused. Many media outlets decried the request as inappropriate and a judge ordered a stay. It's been insinuated that San Diego county is trying to target or punish Davis for bringing negative media attention regarding the inmate deaths.

=== California right-to-die law ===
Davis received national attention in 2016 for an essay she wrote about her sister Betsy, who suffered from late-stage ALS and legally ended her life under California's right-to-die law.

== Personal life ==
Davis was born in 1973 and grew up in Irvine, California. She played guitar and vocals in indie bands Super Thirty-One and Aberdeen. She met her future bandmate and husband Brian Espinosa at a Jesus and Mary Chain/Spiritualized concern in Hollywood. Davis survived a bout with breast cancer and was in remission for over a decade. In 2026, the cancer returned; she died at the UC San Diego Health East Campus Medical Center on July 1, 2026.
