= Argus Observer =

Weekly newspaper published in Ontario, Oregon

- Type: Weekly newspaper
- Owner: Wick Communications
- Publisher: Leslie Thompson
- Founded: January 6, 1897; 129 years ago
- Language: English
- Headquarters: Ontario, Oregon, U.S.
- Circulation: 4,987
- Website: argusobserver.com

The Argus Observer is a weekly newspaper in Ontario, Oregon, United States. It is owned by Wick Communications.

== History ==
The newspaper and went through several names and owners before becoming the Argus Observer, which is a reference to Argus Panoptes, a creature from Greek mythology that had 100 eyes.

The paper was established January 6, 1897 as a weekly publication in Vale, Oregon called the District Silver Advocate. The first proprietor was Bert Venable and editor John E. Roberts. The paper's name was in reference to the Free Silver Movement, which the publication supported along with politician William Jennings Bryan.

Roberts moved the paper from Vale to Ontario, changed its name to the Advocate and it became an organ of the Democratic Party. Don Carlos Boyd purchased the paper on November 28, 1900, changed its allegiance to Republican and assumed the name Argus. In the paper's first decade it was generally a weekly newspaper, with at least two short-lived efforts to switch to daily publication.

In January 1947, Ralph Curtis sold The Ontario Argus to Bernard Mainwaring and Don Lynch. At the time the two men owned The Idaho Press. That same year In August they bought the Eastern Oregon Observer, a paper founded in Ontario by Elmo Smith in 1936. Smith sold the Observer to Jessica Longston and Robert Pollock in December 1946 and eight months later they sold it again to Mainwaring and Lynch. It was then the Argus and Observer were merged to form the Argus Observer. Mainwaring sold his interests in the paper to Lynch in February 1953. Lynch sold the paper in 1962 to William F. MacKnight, publisher and president of Malheur Publishing Co. He sold it to Wick Communications in 1968. Two years later the paper assumed a daily publication schedule in 1970.

In summer 2020, the Independent-Enterprise in Payette, Idaho was folded into the Argus Observer. In January 2024, the newspaper notified readers it plans to cut print days from four to two starting March 1. Also, delivery will transition from carrier to postal and the paper's Ontario printing operation will shutter. Moving forward, the paper will be printed in Nampa, Idaho. About a year later the Argus Observer announced it will cease it's Saturday print edition and moving forward will only publish once a week on Wednesdays.

In April 2025, Wick announced it was looking to sell the Argus Observer.

== See also ==
- List of newspapers in Oregon
