= The Kingman Daily Miner =

Newspaper in Kingman, Arizona

The Kingman Miner
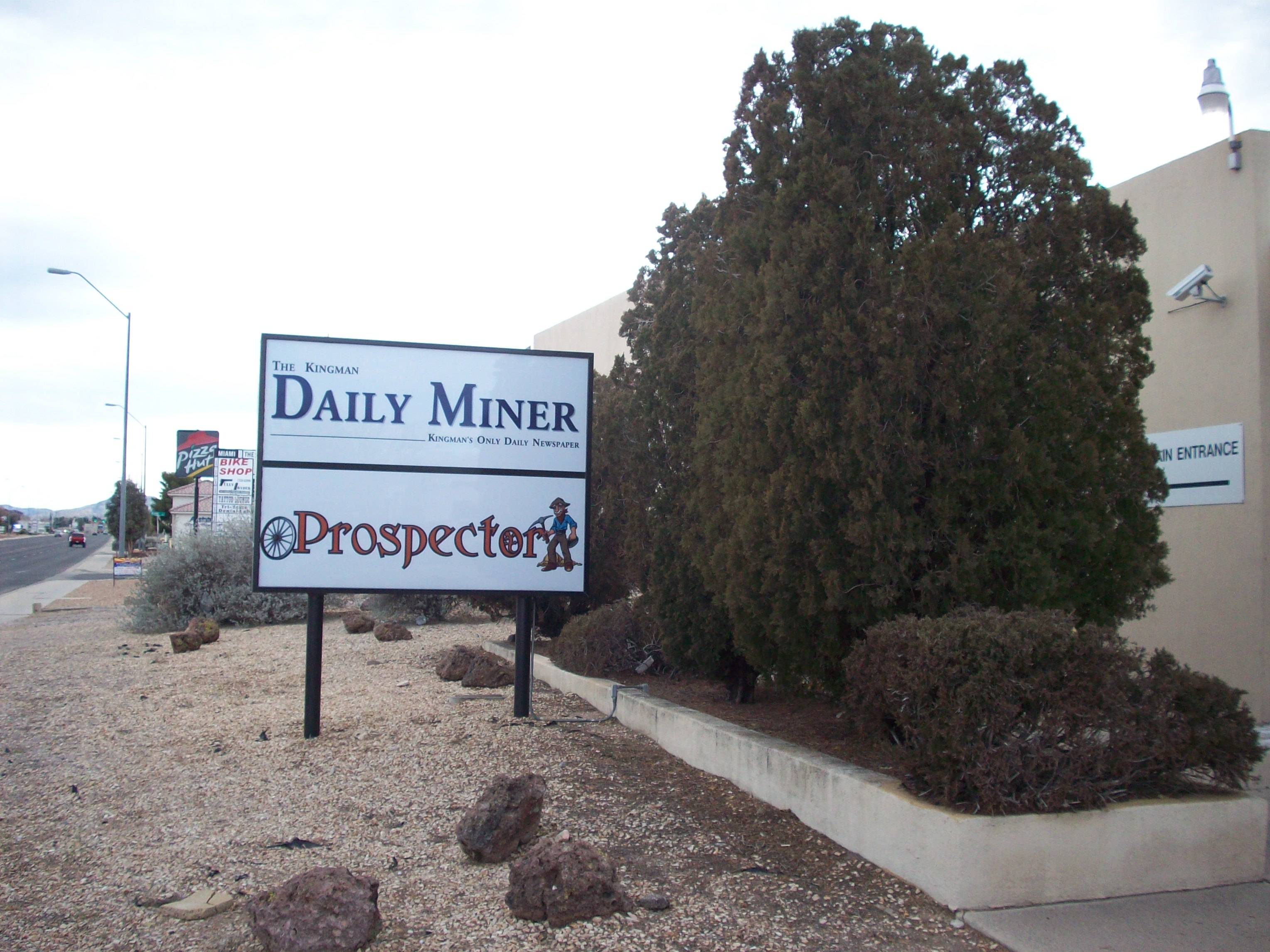
- Offices in Kingman
- Type: Weekly newspaper
- Format: Broadsheet; Internet
- Owner: River City Newspapers
- Founder: Anson H. Smith
- Founded: 1882
- Language: English
- Headquarters: 701 Stockton Hill Rd., Suite P, Kingman, AZ 86401 United States
- Circulation: 3,904 (as of 2022)
- ISSN: 1535-9913
- Website: kdminer.com

The Kingman Miner is a local newspaper in Kingman, Arizona, owned by River City Newspapers.

== History ==
The Mohave County Miner was first publish on November 5, 1882. Anson H. Smith, with J.J. Hyde as editor. Smith sold the paper to M.O. Ream in 1933. J. James Glancy bought the paper from Ream in 1941. Glancy sold out to C.R. Walters and Donald N. Soldwedel in 1968.

The Soldwedel owned their papers under the company name Western News & Info. In 1995, they founded a joint venture with Wick Communications called River City Newspapers. Ownership of the Miner was transferred to River City in 2022.
