= The Wenatchee World =

Daily newspaper in Wenatchee, Washington, U.S.

- Type: Daily newspaper
- Format: Broadsheet
- Owner: Wick Communications
- Founder(s): C.A. Briggs and Nat Ament
- Publisher: Sean Flaherty
- Editor: Nancy Niles
- Founded: 1905
- Language: English
- Headquarters: 14 N. Mission Street, Wenatchee, WA 98801
- Circulation: 15,001 (as of 2022)
- ISSN: 2328-3882
- OCLC number: 14402228
- Website: wenatcheeworld.com

The Wenatchee World is the leading daily newspaper in Wenatchee and East Wenatchee, Washington, United States. It has been published since 1905.

== History ==
The World Publishing Company was founded in 1905 by businessmen C.A. Briggs and Nat Ament. On July 3, 1905, the company published the first issue of The Wenatchee Daily World. The issue included a pledge "to be an active, helping factor in not alone the city of Wenatchee and the county of Chelan, but also in our neighbor counties of Douglas and Okanogan."

Two years later, the newspaper was purchased by Rufus Woods and his twin brother Ralph. Rufus published the newspaper while Ralph, a Tacoma attorney, provided legal advice to the fledgling paper. Later, their cousin Warren W. Woods joined the company to handle the newspaper's finances as treasurer.

Rufus Woods and the Daily World became integrally involved in the 23-year battle for Coulee Dam, and the Columbia Basin Irrigation Project. Woods wrote the first story about the proposal in 1918, which was followed by hundreds of articles about the project and editorials promoting the concept.

Upon Rufus Woods' death in 1950, his son Wilfred R. Woods became editor and publisher. Warren Woods' son, Robert W. Woods, eventually became executive editor. In 1956, W.W. Woods died. In 1990, Robert was promoted to associate publisher and Wilfred's son Rufus G. Woods was named managing editor. In 1996, Robert E. Ficken published a biography on Rufus Woods.

In 1997, Wilfred Woods retired and turned the management of the company over to his son, Rufus G. Woods. In 2007, the paper acquired The Quincy Valley Post-Register. In 2017, W.R. Woods died. In March 2018, Rufus Woods announced that the Woods family had sold the newspaper to Wick Communications. All of the employees at that time were offered jobs with the new owners.

On April 1, 2015, the newspaper switched to morning delivery, ending the practice of youth carriers delivering the paper. At that time, there were about 50 youth carriers still employed by the paper. In September 2023, the newspaper transitioned from carrier to postal delivery via the U.S. Postal Service. In October 2024, Wicks purchased Wenatchee television station NCWLife from LocalTel. In January 2026, Rick Boone, was named news director for the combined NCWLife and World newsroom.

== Motto ==
The newspaper prints on its front page that it is "Published in the Apple Capital of the World and the Buckle of the Power Belt of the Great Northwest".
