= Edible Baja Arizona =

- Categories: Food
- Founder: Douglas Biggers
- First issue: Summer 2013
- Final issue Number: November/December 2017; 27
- Company: Salt in Pepper Shaker, LLC
- Country: United States
- Based in: Tucson, Arizona
- Language: English
- ISSN: 2374-345X

Edible Baja Arizona was a magazine that published stories about the intersection of food and culture in Tucson and the Arizona/Sonora borderlands region. The magazine was published on a bi-monthly basis and was founded in 2013 by Tucson Weekly co-founder Douglas Biggers, its editor and publisher.

The magazine suspended publication in December 2017 after publishing 27 issues. The magazine earned more than three dozen awards for editorial and design excellence.
