= Mat-Su Valley Frontiersman =

Semi-weekly newspaper based in Alaska, US

- Type: Semi-weekly newspaper
- Format: Tall Tab
- Owner: Mat-Su Sentinel
- Founder: Viola Daniels
- Editor: Jeremiah Bartz
- General manager: Jay Curran
- Founded: 1947
- Language: English
- Headquarters: 5751 E. Mayflower Ct. Wasilla, AK 99654; United States
- Circulation: 1,500 (as of 2025)
- Website: frontiersman.com

The Mat-Su Valley Frontiersman is a newspaper serving the Matanuska-Susitna Valley of Alaska. It is owned by the Mat-Su Sentinel, publishing every Sunday, Wednesday, and Friday.

== History ==
On November 20, 1946, Miss Viola Daniels published the first edition of The Frontiersman in Seldovia, Alaska. It was a biweekly mimeographed created by Daniels, a former school teacher. On August 30, 1947, Daniels announced she had sold the paper to Pat and Lee O’Brien. It ceased that December.

On September 20, 1947, Daniels launched another paper called the Valley Frontiersman in Palmer, Alaska. In 1949, Alvin Jay DeJulio and his wife Billie Jean DeJulio bought the paper. DeJulio previously worked at the Anchorage Daily Times and was one of the co-founders of the Anchorage Daily News. On October 13, 1950, Daniels announced she was retiring from the paper. Miss Opal Lu Smith was then named editor. On March 23, 1951, Marian Badcon was named editor.

At age 47, A.J. DeJulio died from a brief illness in June 1959. His widow then remarried in May 1960 to Theodore "Ted" O. Schmidtke, who formerly worked at the Anchorage Daily News. Mr. Schmidtke at some point was elected mayor of Palmer, Alaska. The couple divorced in August 1973 and Mrs. Schmidtke moved to Winslow, Washington. Ted Schmidtke drowned in Wasilla Lake in October 1973. He was age 45. Mrs. Schmidtke then put the Frontiersman up for sale.

In March 1974, Jerome F. Sheldon bought the paper from her. In 1978, Leighton P. Wood, owner of the Skagit Valley Herald in Washington, purchased the paper from Sheldon. Wood's family also owned Pioneer Newspapers of Seattle. Following the sale, Dave Ward was then installed as publisher and soon faced competition from the newly-founded Valley Sun of Wasilla, Alaska, operated by Jack Sorgenfrei. The two paper's merged production operations in 1979 but maintained separate ownership. Former Wasilla mayor Harold Newcomb launched another rival paper in 1983 called the Valley Press, but it ceased after three years. By then the Valley Sun had been absorbed into the Frontiersman.

Shelly Gill, former editor of Alaska Woman Magazine, became publisher of the Frontiersman in 1983. During her five-year-reign, the Frontiersman won a 1986 National Newspaper Association award for a series on child sexual abuse. In 1987, Gill directed two reporters to eavesdrop at a cafe where a majority of borough assembly members had gathered after their regular meetings and reported on the overheard conversation. The paper then sued the assembly for violating Open meeting laws by discussing government issues in private and later reached a settlement.

In 1993, Wood sold the paper to Michael and Patricia Lindsey, of Wyoming, for more than $1 million. In 1996, the couple sold the paper to Wick Communications. At that time the Frontiersman had a circulation of 7,000. In 2006, Wick purchased Anchorage Press Publishing, which published the Anchorage Press.

In January 2025, Wick announced it was looking to sell the paper. In May 2026, the Frontiersman and Press were acquired by the Mat-Su Sentinel, a two-year-old digital-only nonprofit newsroom. Following the sale, the Frontiersman will discontinue it's print edition. Its archive will remain online for free while its newspaper and photo archive will be donated to a local museum or library. Wick retained ownership of the Wasilla printing facility and the paper's adjacent office building. Moving forward, new articles posted to the Frontiersman's website will redirect to the Sentinel's website. It's undecided whether or not the paper's four staff members will be retained or let go. The Press was sold off that June.

== Notable staff ==
Former Alaska governor and vice-presidential candidate Sarah Palin worked for the newspaper as a sports reporter. Longtime sports writer Jeremiah Bartz is the managing editor.
