= The Williams News =

Newspaper in Williams, Arizona

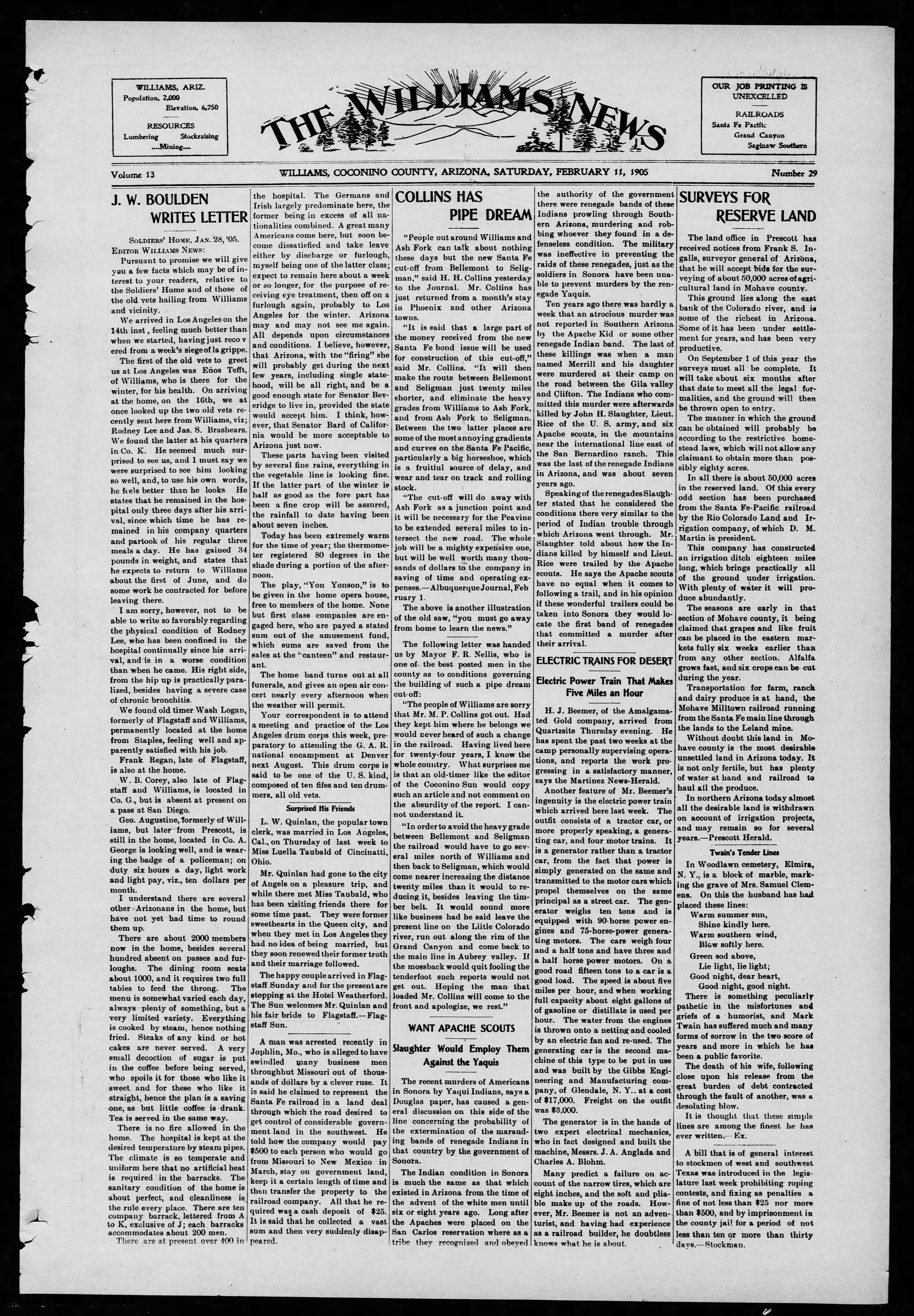
- Front page of paper, February 11, 1905
- Format: Weekly newspaper
- Owner: River City Newspapers
- Founder: J.F. Michael
- Publisher: Judy Martinez
- Editor: Doreen Holtje
- Founded: 1892
- Language: English
- Headquarters: 118 S. 3rd Street
- City: Williams, Arizona
- Country: United States
- ISSN: 2334-5861
- OCLC number: 213781138
- Website: williamsnews.com

The Williams News is a weekly newspaper published founded in Williams, Arizona.

== History ==
On Aug. 13, 1892, J.F. Michael published the first weekly edition of The Williams News. The paper was acquired by George W. Young in January 1896, Charles A. Neal in August 1901, Frank L. Moore in October 1906, and Frank Evarts Wells Sr. in November 1913.

Clifford S. Klock in December 1916 established a rival paper in town called The Williams Times, but it ceased in October 1917 after its subscription list was sold to the News.

Wells established another paper in 1936 called the Northern Yavapi Record which covered Ash Fork and Seligman. He published both titles until his death in January 1965 at age 77. His son Frank Evarts Wells Jr. became publisher and died in July 1978 at age 66. His son Doug Wells then inherited the two papers.

In November 1980, the Record was absorbed into the News, which at some point was renamed to the Williams-Grand Canyon-News. In November 1991, Western Newspapers acquired the News from the Wells family. In October 2026, ownership was transferred to River City Newspapers, a joint venture between Western News & Info and Wick Communications.
