= Anchorage Press =

- Type: Alternative weekly
- Owner(s): Veri di Suvero; Nathaniel Herz; Noisy Creek
- Publisher: Veri di Suvero
- Editor: Nathaniel Herz
- Founded: 1992; 34 years ago
- Headquarters: 540 East 5th Avenue; Anchorage, AK 99501; United States
- Circulation: 15,500 (as of 2020)
- Website: anchoragepress.com

The Anchorage Press is a free alternative weekly newspaper based in Anchorage, Alaska. Starting in 2022, the paper has been digital only, but new ownership announced that the print edition will be revived in 2026.

== History ==
In September 1992, Bill Boulay, Barry Bialik, and Nick Coltman established the Anchorage Bypass. In 1994, it was renamed the Anchorage Press. In 2006, Anchorage Press Publishing, which published the newspaper, was purchased by Wick Communications, the owner of the Mat-Su Valley Frontiersman. In 2022, the paper discontinued its print edition becoming an online only publication. Most staff were laid off; the paper had lost $150,000 in the past year.

In January 2025, Wick announced it was looking to sell the paper. In May 2026, the Frontiersman and Press were acquired by the Mat-Su Sentinel, a two-year-old digital only nonprofit newsroom, which announced plans to hand the Press over to a local entrepreneur interested in reviving the alt-weekly. In June 2026, the Press was sold to nonprofit manager Veri di Suvero and journalist Nathaniel Herz, along with Noisy Creek, a company in Seattle which owns The Stranger and the Chicago Reader.

== See also ==
- List of alternative weekly newspapers
