= Times Media Group (Arizona) =

American media company based in Arizona

- Formerly: Times Publications
- Founded: 2004; 22 years ago
- Founder: Steve Strickbine
- Headquarters: Tempe, Arizona
- Website: timespublications.com

Times Media Group is an American media company based in the state of Arizona.

Its publications include: 85085 Magazine, 85086 Magazine, Ahwatukee Foothills News, College Times Magazine, The Entertainer! Magazine, East Valley Tribune, Gilbert Sun News, Lovin' Life After 50, Nearby News, North Valley Magazine, SanTan Sun News, Scottsdale Airpark News, West Valley View, Scottsdale Airpark News, The Glendale Star and Peoria Times. TMG also owns and operates AZ Integrated Media, a media distribution and custom publishing company, and runs the website Phoenix.org.

Times Media Group was founded by Arizona publisher Steve Strickbine, and has its headquarters in Tempe, Arizona.

== The Valley Times ==
In 2004, Strickbine launched Times Publications, a family of features publications in Scottsdale, AZ. It became the highest-circulated family of free-distribution features publications in the state of Arizona.

== Acquisitions ==
In 2009, Times Media Group acquired the publication Lovin' Life After 50, a senior active adult publication founded in 1979. The publication hosts annual expos that cater to the Arizona senior market.

In 2010, the Group acquired Scottsdale Airpark News, a business-to-business publication founded in 1980. The publication is a magazine, with a circulation of 25,000 copies available at more than 1,000 locations throughout the Scottsdale Airpark area.

In 2011, the group acquired Nearby News Publications, a trio of direct-mailed publications based in east Phoenix metro area. Nearby News consists of The Groves Report, The View and The North Gilbert Breeze

In 2012, the group acquired AZ Integrated Media and its flagship publication College Times Magazine, a publication targeting 15- to 34-year-old young adults. The weekly entertainment magazine is published 24 times a year and distributed at 1,200 strategically chosen locations in and near Phoenix, and enjoys more than 130,000 readers. With the acquisition of AZ Integrated Media, Times Media Group became the largest distribution company of free media in Arizona, publishing numerous specialty and custom-published products, including the College Bowl Guide, the Spring Training Guide and the College Transfer Guide.

In 2013, the group acquired SanTan Sun News, a free newspaper published twice a month in southern Chandler, Arizona and Gilbert, Arizona, with a circulation of over 32,000. It was formerly known as Ocotillo News, but changed its name in 2005.

In late January 2016, the group acquired East Valley Tribune and Ahwatukee Foothills News from 1013 Communications and immediately assumed day-to-day operations; 1013's other Arizona community newspapers were not included in the sale.

On July 13, 2017, Times Media Group acquired West Valley View, a free weekly newspaper that covers the West Valley cities and towns of Avondale, Buckeye, Goodyear, Litchfield Park, Tolleson and Tonopah. It has a controlled circulation of 75,000+ and is published every Wednesday.

In September 2018, the group relaunched the Scottsdale Progress newspaper. The Scottsdale Progress originally began as a weekly newspaper in 1948, began daily publication in 1961, and ceased publication in 2009.

On October 31, 2018, the group acquired The Glendale Star, Peoria Times and a Luke Air Force Base community magazine which was re-branded with the name Sound of Freedom.

In August 2019, Times Media Group acquired Southland Publishing. The sale included five newspapers: Ventura County Reporter, The Argonaut (Santa Monica, California), Pasadena Weekly, LA Downtown News and San Diego CityBeat. The three magazines acquired included Ventana Monthly, Playa Vista Direct and Arroyo Magazine.

In 2020, Times Media Group acquired The Foothills Focus in New River.

In 2021, Times Media Group acquired the Tucson publications of 10/13 Communications (including The Explorer, the Marana News, Foothills News, Desert Times, Tucson Weekly, and Inside Tucson Business).

In 2022, Times Media Group launched the Queen Creek Tribune.

In 2023, Times Media Group acquired Picket Fence Media, publisher of The San Clemente Times, The Dana Point Times and The Capistrano Dispatch, as well as The Acorn Newspapers in Los Angeles and Ventura counties, California.

In 2024, Times Media Group relaunched The Tempe Tribune, a newspaper that ceased in 2009 after publishing for 122 years. That same year the company acquired four weekly community newspapers and one semi-monthly publication from Century Group Media. The sale included the Banning Record Gazette, the Redlands Community News, Fontana Herald News, along with Yucaipa and Calimesa News Mirror in the Inland Empire. In July, Times Media Group also acquired Firebrand Media. The sale included the Laguna Beach Independent, the Newport Beach Independent, the Coast Real Estate Guide, Laguna Beach Magazine and Newport Beach Magazine in Orange County.

In 2025, the company acquired 21 community newspapers near Denver, Colorado from the National Trust for Local New. In 2026, the company acquired 32 community newspapers in Texas from Moser Community Media.
