= The Daily Iberian =

Newspaper from Iberia, Louisiana, owned by Wick Communications

- Type: Daily newspaper
- Owner: Carpenter Media Group
- Founded: 1893
- Headquarters: 124 East Main Street, New Iberia, Louisiana 70560
- Circulation: 6,500 Daily; 6,800 Sunday
- Website: thedailyiberian.com

The Daily Iberian is a daily newspaper founded in 1893 in New Iberia, Louisiana, United States. It publishes editions on Wednesday, Friday and Sunday. The Daily Iberian is a sister publication of Acadiana LifeStyle.

== History ==
In May 2023, Ken Harty was named the publisher. In April 2024, Wick Communications sold The Daily Iberian to Carpenter Media Group.
