= Half Moon Bay Review =

American digital newspaper

- Type: Digital newspaper
- Owner: Coastside News Group
- Founder: Harry E. Griffiths
- Publisher: Emma Spaeth
- Editor: Peter Tokofsky
- Founded: 1905; 121 years ago
- Language: English
- Website: hmbreview.com

The Half Moon Bay Review is an American online news source that has been serving the Coastside area of San Mateo County, California, from Pacifica to the Santa Cruz County line since 1905. A broadsheet newspaper was published each Wednesday morning until 2024 when the publication switched to digital-only distribution.The Review is owned by Coastside News Group, Inc., a California Benefit Corporation created by a group of community members.

== History ==
In May 1905, Harry E. Griffiths, former editor of the Concord Transcript, established the Half Moon Bay Review. Griffiths sold the paper around 1913 to R.A. Bergthhold, who went on to own the Review for four and a half years. In 1917, George E. Dunn purchased the Review. He previously operated the Coastside Comet, started the Pacifica Tribune, and later created the Pescadero Pebble which was eventually merged into the Review. In his prime, Dunn smoked 15 cigars a day. He was a civic leader who was one of the main forces behind construction of the Pillar Point breakwater and the Coast Highway and the incorporation of Half Moon Bay.

In 1960, Dunn sold the paper to Edward M. Bauer. He and his wife, Marjorie Bauer, published the Review for 26 years until selling it in 1986 to Wick Communications. Three decades later, the company announced plans to sell the newspaper in September 2017. A group of community members, calling themselves the Coastside News Group, entered into an agreement to purchase the paper from Wick in February 2018, and the sale was completed in June 2018. Coastside News Group purchased the Pacifica Tribune in October 2020. The Review discontinued its print edition and went online-only in 2024.
