= Inside Tucson Business =

- Type: Weekly business newspaper
- Format: Tabloid
- Owner: Times Media Group
- Publisher: Thomas P. Lee
- Editor: David Hatfield
- Founded: 1990; 36 years ago
- Language: English
- Headquarters: P.O. Box 27087; Tucson, AZ 85726; United States
- Price: $1
- ISSN: 1069-5184
- Website: insidetucsonbusiness.com

Inside Tucson Business is a weekly newspaper published in Tucson that covers the business, financial, and economic news of Southern Arizona.

== History ==
Wick Communications published the paper from 1992 until 2014, when it was sold to 10/13 Communications. In 2021, Times Media Group acquired the Tucson publications of 10/13 Communications (including The Explorer, the Marana News, Foothills News, Desert Times, Tucson Weekly, and Inside Tucson Business).

== See also ==
- List of business newspapers
- List of newspapers in Arizona
