= Arizona Daily Sun =

Newspaper in Flagstaff, Arizona

- Type: Daily newspaper
- Owner: Wick Communications
- Founder: Artemis E. Fay
- Publisher: Doug Bauer
- Editor: Cody Bashore; Moriah Heberer
- Associate editor: Michael Hartman
- Managing editor: Chris Etling
- General manager: Angila Menter
- Photographer: Jake Bacon; Hattie Loper
- Founded: September 15, 1883 (as the Arizona Champion)
- Language: English
- Headquarters: Flagstaff, Arizona
- Circulation: 7,712 Daily; 7,354 Sunday (as of 2022)
- ISSN: 1054-9536
- OCLC number: 10668635
- Website: azdailysun.com

The Arizona Daily Sun is a three day newspaper in Flagstaff, Arizona, United States. It is published on Tuesdays, Thursdays, and Saturdays. The Sun is owned by Wick Communications and dates back to 1883.

== History ==
On September 15, 1883, Artemis E. Fay published the first edition of the weekly Arizona Champion in Peach Springs, Arizona. On February 2, 1884, he relocated the paper to Flagstaff. In September 1885, Fay sold the Champion to J.W. Spafford. In March 1886, Spafford sold the paper to the Flagstaff Publishing Company. In April 1891, C.M Funston, formerly of the Mojave Miner, bought the Champion. A month later, he renamed it to the Coconino Sun. In 1906, Funston sold the Sun to Lloyd C. Henning.

In 1908, Col. Fred Sylvester Breen bought the paper. He published it until his death in 1932. Del Strong then published the Sun for a year. In 1933, brothers George A. Giragi and Columbus T. Giragi, owners of The Winslow Mail and Holbrook News-Tribune, bought the Sun. In 1938, G.A. Giragi died. In 1945, C.T. Giragi sold the paper to W.J. McGissen. On August 5, 1946, the paper was expanded into a daily and renamed to the Arizona Daily Sun.

In 1957, Platt Cline bought the paper. He was associated with Burl C. Hagadone and Scripps League Newspapers. In 1996, Scripps was acquired by Pulitzer, which in 2005 was purchased by Lee Enterprises. In 2023, the Sun was sold to Wick Communications. Later that year, the paper reduced its print schedule to three days a week: Tuesday, Thursday and Saturday. Also, the newspaper switched from carrier to postal delivery.
