= Mohave Valley Daily News =

Newspaper in Bullhead City, Arizona

- Type: Daily newspaper
- Owner: River City Newspapers
- Founder: Lee B. Perry
- Publisher: Richard Macke
- Editor-in-chief: Daisy Nelson
- General manager: Nancy Novak
- Founded: 1964; 62 years ago
- Language: English
- Headquarters: 2580 Hwy 95 Ste 115, Bullhead City, Arizona 86442; United States
- Circulation: 5,190 Daily; 5,567 Sunday (as of 2022)
- Website: mohavedailynews.com

The Mohave Valley Daily News is a newspaper in Bullhead City, Arizona, United States. It is owned by River City Newspapers, LLC.

== History ==
The newspaper was started in 1964 by Lee B. Perry, then owner and publisher of the nearby Needles Desert Star, a weekly newspaper serving Needles, California and the southern Mohave Valley. In 2022, Brehm Communications sold the Mohave Valley Daily News to River City Newspapers, a joint venture between Wick Communications and Western News & Info.
