= William Henderson Kelly =

American anthropologist (1903–1980)

William Henderson Kelly (November 23, 1902 – February 9, 1980) was an American professor of anthropology at the University of Arizona. He was described in the Journal of Arizona History as "one of the foremost authorities on Southwest Indian tribes". He was a founding member of the Bureau of Ethnic Research in Arizona.

He mainly worked with the Cocopah Tribe located in the Southwestern United States and Northern Mexico in the 1940s and learned about their language, ceremonies, and traditional knowledge related to plant use. Resulting publications of his research include his thesis "A Preliminary Study of the Cocopa Indians of Mexico" and Cocopa Ethnography (1977). Throughout his career, Kelly was also a member of various organizations concerned with the study of Indigenous populations including the Inter-American Indian Institute (IAII) and the National Congress of American Indians (NCAI).

== Early life and education ==
Kelly was born in 1903 in Bisbee, Arizona, the son of Arizona newspaperman and politician W. B. Kelly. In the 1920s, he became a newspaperman himself, purchasing The Tombstone Epitaph and becoming its publisher. In 1930, he sold the Epitaph and began working for his father as advertising manager of the Arizona Daily Star. In the early 1930s, he also briefly owned the magazine Progressive Arizona.

He left the publishing business in 1934 to pursue the study of anthropology, with a specialty in the American Southwest, first earning a bachelor's degree at the University of Arizona in 1936 under the mentorship of Byron Cummings, and then continuing for his doctorate at Harvard University, where he worked with Clyde Kluckhohn and Leslie Spier. He defended his Ph.D. in 1943. His dissertation was A Preliminary Study of the Cocopa Indians of Mexico.

== Career ==
After completing his PhD at Harvard, Kelly and his wife returned to Tucson, Arizona, where he became a professor of anthropology at the University of Arizona. Kelly continued his work with the Cocopah tribe and joined a number of international and national organizations, mainly the Inter-American Indian Institute (IAII) and the National Congress of American Indians (NCAI) of which he was an active member.

Kelly was also a founder of the Bureau of Ethnic Research in Arizona, in 1952, which focused on researching and reporting on Indigenous peoples within the borders of the state. He was an active member of the bureau throughout his career.

Kelly died of cancer in Tucson, Arizona.

== Works ==
- Kelly, William H. (1953). Indians of the Southwest: A Survey of Indian Tribes and Indian Administration in Arizona. First Annual Report of the Bureau of Ethnic Research. University of Arizona Press.
- Kelly, William H., ed. (1954). Indian Affairs and the Indian Reorganization Act: The Twenty Year Record. University of Arizona Press.
- Kelly, William H. (1977). Cocopa Ethnography. Anthropological Papers of the University of Arizona. Vol. 29. University of Arizona Press.
