= Fontana Herald News =

Newspaper in Fontana, California, U.S.

- Type: Weekly newspaper
- Owner: Times Media Group
- Founder: Cornelius DeBakcsy
- Publisher: Steve Strickbine
- Editor: Christina Fuoco-Karasinski
- Founded: June 7, 1923; 103 years ago
- Language: English
- City: Fontana, California
- Country: United States
- OCLC number: 35649566
- Website: fontanaheraldnews.com

The Fontana Herald News is a weekly newspaper in Fontana, San Bernardino County, California. Cornelius DeBakcsy founded the Fontana Herald in 1923 and it merged with the Fontana News in 1948. The Herald News is owned by Times Media Group.

== History ==
Cornelius DeBakcsy was a Hungarian journalist born on May 23, 1880 in Austria-Hungary. He was a foreign news correspondent who happened to be in Belgrade on the day of the May Coup where Alexander I of Serbia was assassinated. He claimed to have broken the story for the international press. DeBakcsy was also a close friend of Ahmed Pasha, a prominent member of the Young Turks, along with Hungarian politicians Ferenc Kossuth and Albert Apponyi. He later became editor of an official government-funded paper and helped established the first wire service between the Balkans and Western Europe.

Cornelius DeBakcsy

DeBakcsy came to visit his brother in Portland, Oregon and was prevented from returning home after the outbreak of World War I. He then got a job as associate editor of Szabadsag (Liberty), a Hungarian-language newspaper in Cleveland. A year later he was the Hungarian press representative covering the Panama–Pacific International Exposition in San Francisco. DeBakcsy moved to the San Fernando Valley in 1920, where he had a "poultry project," and then the same year he moved to Fontana and became associated with Azariel Blanchard Miller, founder of the community.

On June 7, 1923, DeBakcsy published the first edition of the weekly Fontana Herald. At that time Fontana had fewer than 500 residents. In July, 1931, the newspaper moved into a building formerly occupied by a justice of the peace and two businesses. An extensive remodeling was done to accommodate a new printing press. The new plant was dedicated with a banquet. Senator Samuel M. Shortridge was the featured guest, and other speakers were R.C. Harbison, editor of the San Bernardino Sun, Justus Craemer of the National Editorial Association, John B. Long of the California Newspaper Publishers Association and Burton L. Smith of the Los Angeles Times. Film star Bela Lugosi also spoke.

DeBakcsy was anti-communist, and a registered Republican. On August 26, 1939, he was honored with a dinner-tribute in Fontana on his 40th anniversary in the newspaper business. Former governors Friend W. Richardson and Frank F. Merriam were present. DeBakcsy died at his home on September 16, 1947. The paper was left to his widow and son Alex DeBakcsy, who was business manager of the Herald.

On November 30, 1944, the Fontana News began publication. It was founded by J. Clifton Toney, who worked as editor. His co-founder was Vernon Paine, publisher of the Upland News. In October 1946, Toney bought Paine's interest and established a plant for the newspaper in Fontana.

On January 26, 1948, a bas-relief plaque of DeBakcsy was presented to the Fontana Women's Club by artist Yucca Salamunich. It was unveiled by retired film actress Betty Blythe Scardon.

In June 1948, Robert K. Hancock, former publisher of the Santa Maria Times, purchased the Herald from Alex DeBakcsy. The Herald and the News were merged effective August 1, 1948, to form the Fontana Herald News, with Hancock and Toney as joint owners. In 1952, the newspaper was sold to Mynatt Smith and Wilbur Mackey of McAllen, Texas. Two years later William R. Fitzgerald acquired the Herald News. He sold it in 1967 to Philip F. Buckner, who was associated with the Scripps League Newspapers. The new owner's company, the Buckner News Alliance of Seattle, came to own eight dailies. By 1984, the Herald News was published five days a week with a circulation of 8,000. George Riggs worked as publisher.

In June 1989, Buckner sold the Herald News and Corona-Norco Independent to The Press-Enterprise Co., publisher of Riverside Press-Enterprise. The company was mostly owned by the Hays family. At that time the News Herald had a 3,220 circulation and the Independent had a 5,400 circulation. A year later the company decided to close the Herald News. Circulation had dwindled to 2,500, making it the fourth smallest daily out of 113 daily California newspapers. At that time the paper employed 24 full-time and 10 part-time workers. Company chairman Tim Hays, said "we took over sick newspaper, one that been losing money for years," and couldn't make it financially successful.

The newspaper was, however, rescued when Century Group Newspapers purchased it. Gerald Bean, head of the company, said he planned to revive the Herald News by only publishing local news, cutting staff from 34 to 21, cutting print days from five to two, and delivering 25,000 copies to local residents for free. In 2001, Cornelius DeBakcsy was posthumously inducted into the California Newspaper Hall of Fame. In 2024, Century Group Media sold the newspaper to Times Media Group.
