= Verde Independent =

Newspaper in Cottonwood, Arizona

- Type: Thrice-weekly newspaper
- Format: Broadsheet
- Owner: River City Newspapers
- Founder: Richard W. Brann
- Publisher: Babette Cubitt
- Editor: Dan Engler
- Founded: 1948
- Circulation: 2,267 Print; 233 E-Subscription (as of 2022)
- OCLC number: 8793570
- Website: verdenews.com

Verde Independent is a local newspaper serving Cottonwood, Arizona. It is published three times a week by River City Newspapers.

== History ==
In 1948, Richard W. Brann and his wife published the first edition of the Verde Independent. It was an eight-page tabloid. Brann previously worked at the Boulder City News.

Brann built the paper's first offices from World War II surplus Quonset huts. The original buildings were located on a river rock foundation in Smelter City, Arizona. Where the first buildings were enlarged and modernized, and they remain the offices for the Independent.

In 1979, Western News & Info bought the paper. In 2015, the paper was criticized for running a lightly edited Sheriff's office press release as if it was a news story. The paper said the lack of labeling was an oversight. In 2026, ownership was transferred to River City Newspapers, a joint venture between Western News & Info and Wick Communications.
