= Sedona Red Rock News =

Newspaper in Sedona, Arizona

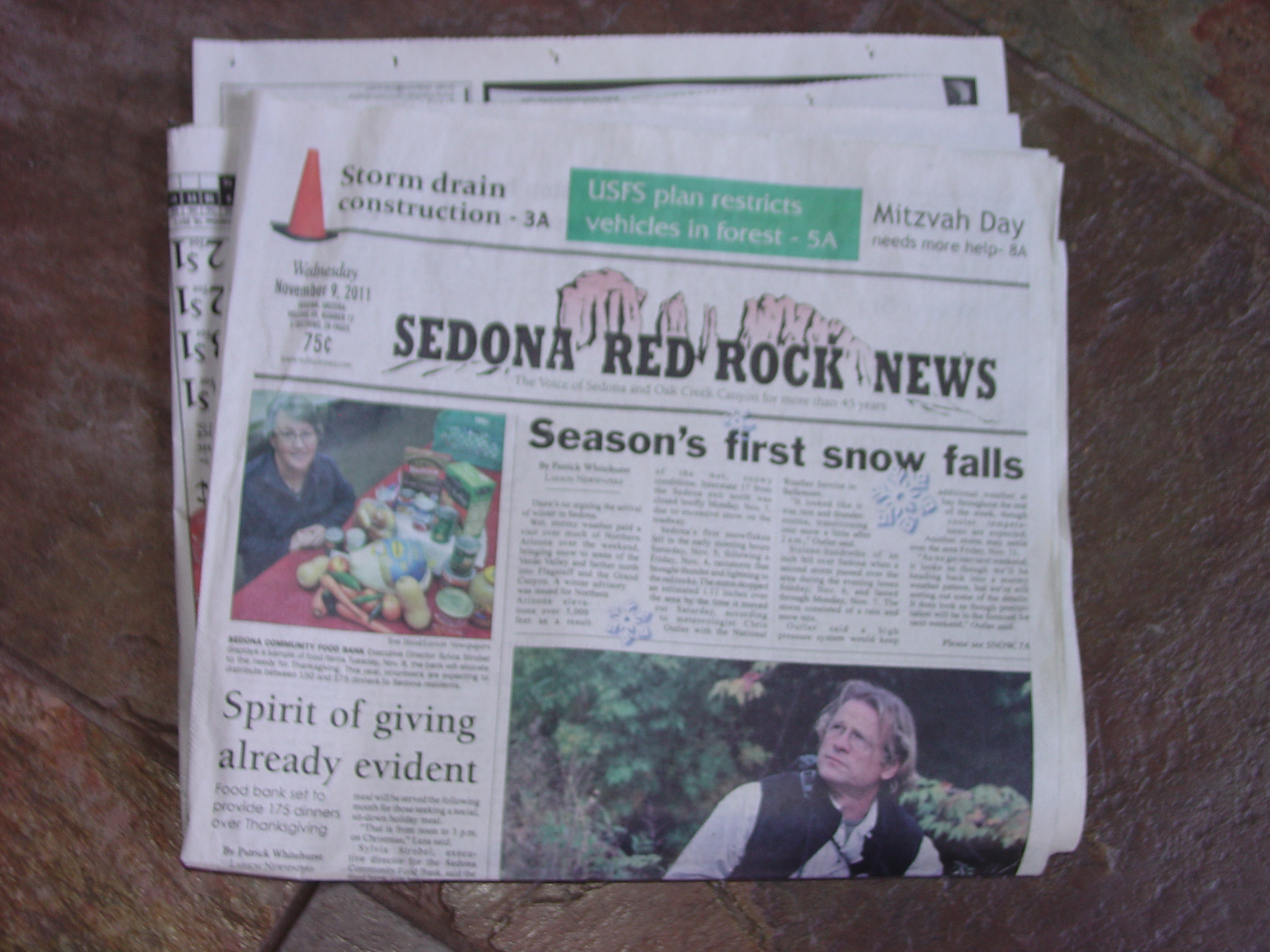
- Sedona Red Rock News
- Type: Twice weekly newspaper
- Format: Broadsheet
- Owner: Wick Communications
- Publisher: Robert B. Larson
- Editor: Christopher Fox Graham
- Founded: October 3, 1963
- Language: English
- Headquarters: 298 Van Deren Road; Sedona, Arizona 86336; United States
- Circulation: 4,295 Print; 428 E-Subscription (as of 2022)
- Sister newspapers: Camp Verde Journal
- ISSN: 1044-7555
- Website: redrocknews.com

The Sedona Red Rock News is a newspaper published in Sedona, Arizona, United States. It is owned by Wick Communications.

== History ==
In 1963, husband and wife Robert S. Larson and Loretta Larson founded the Red Rock News in Sedona, Arizona. Six years earlier the couple founded and continued to operate another paper called the Sunnyslope News. In 1982, the paper's name was changed to the Sedona Red Rock News. In 1989, the News added a second weekly print edition.

In 2013, Christopher Fox Graham was promoted from news editor to managing editor. In 2015, General Manager Kyle Larson, grandson of the paper's founders, took charge of the day-to-day operation. In 2026, Wick Communications acquired the News and the Camp Verde Journal from Larson Newspapers.
