= Southland Publishing =

American newspaper and magazine publisher

Southland Publishing, Inc.
- Predecessor: Ventura Newspaper, Inc. (founded Ventura County Reporter in 1978)
- Founded: 1997; 29 years ago
- Defunct: 2019; 7 years ago
- Successor: Times Media Group
- Country of origin: United States
- Headquarters location: Pasadena, California
- Key people: Bruce Bolkin, president; David Comden, vice-president
- Publication types: The Argonaut, Pasadena Weekly, San Diego CityBeat, Ventura County Reporter, Arroyo Monthly, Ventana Monthly, Playa Vista Direct, Ventura Direct, Los Angeles Downtown News
- Nonfiction topics: General news, arts & entertainment, politics
- Imprints: Newspapers, alternative weekly, magazines

Southland Publishing, Inc. was a publishing company from 1997 to 2019 based in Pasadena, California, with five offices in Southern California (Downtown Los Angeles, Ventura County, Santa Monica, Pasadena, and San Diego). The company published weekly newspapers, monthly magazines, direct mail products, and operated affiliated websites throughout California and selected states throughout the U.S.

== Publications ==
=== Alternative weeklies ===
- Pasadena Weekly
- San Diego CityBeat
- Ventura County Reporter

=== Community weekly ===
- The Argonaut
- Los Angeles Downtown News

=== Monthly magazines ===
- Arroyo Monthly
- Culture Magazine (sold Fall 2018)
- Ventana Monthly

==== Direct Mail monthly ====
- Ventura Direct

== History ==
Ventura Newspaper, Inc. had been founded in 1976, to publish the Ventura County & Coast Reporter. The company was purchased in 1997, and renamed Southland Publishing, Inc. in 1998, to reflect the new owner's vision of building a multi-media company throughout Southern California. Southland Publishing was named and spearheaded by David Comden, its first Group Publisher. The vision was to develop a group of newsweeklies that covered counties, cities and neighborhoods in Greater Los Angeles – the "Southland" – which were similar in concept but unique to each market served.

Southland Publishing grew to have a collective of newsweeklies, magazines and direct mail publications, all printed by Valley Business Printers in the neighborhood of Sylmar, Los Angeles. Amongst Valley Business Printers' third party customers, until the end of March 2003, was the city-wide LA Weekly; in June 2003, just three months after LA Weekly cancelled its contract for printing services, Southland Publishing launched its own publication, LA CityBeat, to compete with its former printing customer.

The first publication for Southland was the Ventura County Reporter, a newsweekly serving Ventura County, California. In January 2001, Southland purchased the Pasadena Weekly in 2001 from Tribune Company (then owners of the Los Angeles Times). Southland Publishing then purchased SLAMM magazine, a music biweekly, from publisher Kevin Hellman in 2002, changing the name to San Diego CityBeat.

Southland then purchased the "Inland Empire Weekly" ("IE Weekly"), another newsweekly serving the San Bernardino and Riverside Counties (The Inland Empire)founded by Jeremy Jachary.

Southland then purchased The Argonaut in 2013. The Argonaut, founded in 1971, was initially focused on the new Marina del Rey and has since expanded its coverage to include West Los Angeles: Santa Monica, Venice, Playa Vista, Playa del Rey, Westchester, and Marina del Rey. In 2017, Southland purchased the Los Angeles Downtown News from Sue Laris, who founded the publication in 1972.

=== Los Angeles Downtown News ===
The Los Angeles Downtown News was launched to serve the downtown commuter crowd of the 1970s. Since that time, Downtown Los Angeles has blossomed into a 24/7 live-work urban city with thousands of hotel rooms and condos built to accommodate the workforce. In addition, the area is now home to world class entertainment facilities, museums, and restaurants.

=== Pasadena Weekly ===
Pasadena Weekly was launched in 1984 by the Los Angeles Times, and purchased by Southland Publishing in 2001. It covers community news on Pasadena, such as city government, public safety, and events, along with opinion, arts, entertainment and dining listings, and an 8-days listing with events scheduled for the Pasadena community. It is published on Thursdays and it is available only on newsstands located in the downtown area for free. It also publishes "Happy Birthday, Pasadena" to celebrate the city's anniversary of incorporation in June, the "Best of Pasadena" edition in November, and a "Welcome Pasadena" edition in December during Christmas involving the Rose Parade.

=== San Diego CityBeat ===
San Diego CityBeat (formerly SLAMM magazine) was bought from Kevin Hellman by Southland in 2002, which converted it into an alternative newsweekly seeking to target young, educated readers in San Diego, an audience whose needs, Southland's owners felt, were not being met by the other two major publications in San Diego, The San Diego Union-Tribune and the San Diego Reader.

=== Ventura County Reporter ===
The Ventura County Reporter was founded in 1976 in Oxnard, California. Purchased from Nancy Cloutier in 1997, the paper was then known as the Ventura County & Coast Reporter, officed in the Ventura Harbor Village. The weekly was renamed the Ventura County Reporter (also known as the VC Reporter on its website) and David Comden was brought in to be publisher in 1998. The offices were located at 700 E. Main Street in downtown Ventura, before moving into the same building as the Pasadena Weekly in South Pasadena.

Among the magazines under the Southland banner, serving areas in Los Angeles County, were: Arroyo Monthly, serving the communities of the San Gabriel Valley; Ventana Monthly, serving the city of Pasadena and area; Playa Vista Direct focusing on the Playa Vista neighborhood of Los Angeles; and Culture Magazine, focusing on the cannabis culture – though Southland sold Culture to Hightimes Holding Corp., publisher of the similarly themed High Times, in 2018.

== Current Publisher ==
Southland Publishing, Inc. was sold in July 2019 to Times Media Group, which continued to publish several of the original titles.
