= The Daily Territorial =

Newspaper in Tucson, Arizona

- Type: Daily newspaper
- Owner: Wick Communications
- Founder: E. D. Jewett
- Editor: David Hatfield
- Founded: 1966
- Language: English
- Headquarters: PO Box 27087; Tucson, Arizona 85726; United States
- Circulation: 207 (as of 2022)
- Website: dailyterritorial.com

The Daily Territorial is a daily (Monday-Friday) newspaper in Tucson, Arizona, United States, covering local legal business news. Pima County's legal paper of record, it lists legal notices filed within the county as well as some business news.

== History ==
The newspaper was founded in 1966 by E.D. Jewett. After his retirement, his company Territorial Publishers was managed by his son Stephen E. Jewett. In 1990, The Daily Territorial and two other newspapers (The Weekly Territorial and Ore Valley Territorial) were sold to Wick Communications. At that time the paper had a circulation of 3,000. In 1993, E.D. Jewett died.
