= Casa Grande Valley Newspapers =

Arizona based newspaper company

Casa Grande Valley Newspapers Inc.
- Type: Private
- Industry: Publishing/ Commercial Printing
- Headquarters: Casa Grande, Arizona
- Key people: Ruth Kramer, President; Donovan Kramer Jr., Co-publisher/Managing Editor; Kara K. Cooper, Co-publisher/Advertising Director
- Number of employees: 100+
- Website: trivalleycentral.com

Casa Grande Valley Newspapers Inc. is a family owned and operated newspaper and commercial printing company based in Casa Grande, Arizona. Since its inception, it has grown to 6 community newspapers, 4 specialty publications, 3 news websites and a digital marketing division. CGVNI prints all of its publications and those of its sister company, White Mountain Publishing, at its plant in downtown Casa Grande. It recently built a 7,500-square-foot (700 m^{2}) warehouse to store its newsprint rolls in the Central Arizona Commerce Park. Its flagship is the Casa Grande Dispatch.

== Publications ==
| City | Publication | Description |
|---|---|---|
| Casa Grande | Casa Grande Dispatch | thrice-weekly newspaper (Tuesday, Thursday, Saturday) |
| Maricopa | Maricopa Monitor | weekly newspaper |
| Coolidge | Coolidge Examiner | weekly newspaper |
| Florence | Florence Reminder & Blade-Tribune | weekly newspaper |
| Eloy | Eloy Enterprise | twice-monthly newspaper |
| Arizona City | Arizona City Independent | twice-monthly newspaper |
| San Tan Valley | SanTanValleySentinel.com | local news website |
| Pinal County | Arizona Real Estate Buyers' Guide | real estate publication |
| Pinal County | Central Saver | direct-mailed shopper |
| Pinal County | Pinal Ways | quarterly magazine |
| Pinal County | BlossomMarketingAgency.com | social media, search engine marketing, geo-targeting, email marketing brand strategy |

== White Mountain Publishing ==
| City | Publication | Description |
|---|---|---|
| Show Low | White Mountain Independent | twice-a-week newspaper |
| Payson | Payson Roundup | twice-a-week newspaper |
