= SanTan Sun News =

Newspaper in Maricopa County, Arizona

The SanTan Sun News is a free bi-weekly newspaper published in southern Chandler and Gilbert, Arizona. It has a circulation of over 32,000. It was formerly known as the Ocotillo News, but changed its name in 2005.

== History of SanTan Sun News ==
The paper was founded as Ocotillo News by Sandy Holland of Clemente Ranch in 1995. Laurie Fagen and Geoff Hancock, as Fagen-Hancock LLC, purchased the Ocotillo News in 2000, when the page count was 16–20 pages and circulation at about 7,000. Within the next year, Ocotillo News was replaced in the masthead with Southern Chandler News. A name changing contest was held in the fall of 2004 and launched the new name, SanTan Sun News, in January 2005.

Fagen-Hancock LLC sold SanTan Sun News to Times Media in March 2013, following the death of Geoff Hancock.
