= J. F. Brown =

American politician in Arizona

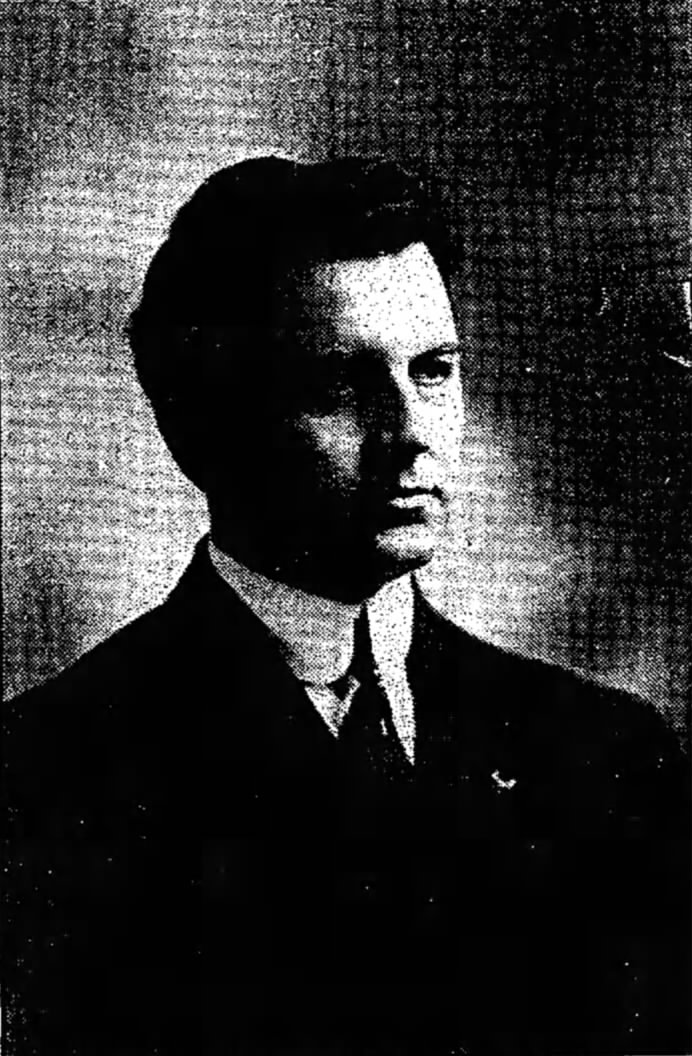
- Brown ca. 1914

Member of the Arizona Senate from the Pinal County district
- In office March 1912 – January 1915
- Preceded by: First Senator from Pinal County
- Succeeded by: Charles E. MacMillan

Personal details
- Born: June 9, 1877
- Died: December 19, 1950 (aged 73) Tucson, Arizona
- Party: Republican
- Profession: Politician

John Fred Brown was a politician from Arizona who served in the 1st Arizona State Legislature. He was known as "the father of modern Casa Grande". He was a long-time agent for the Southern Pacific Railroad, in charge of their Casa Grande station. He also served for 30 years as the U.S. land commissioner for Pinal County, from the state's inception in 1912 until 1943. He was also instrumental in the drive to get the San Carlos Irrigation Project passed through the U. S. Congress, eventually leading to the construction of the Coolidge Dam.

== Early life ==
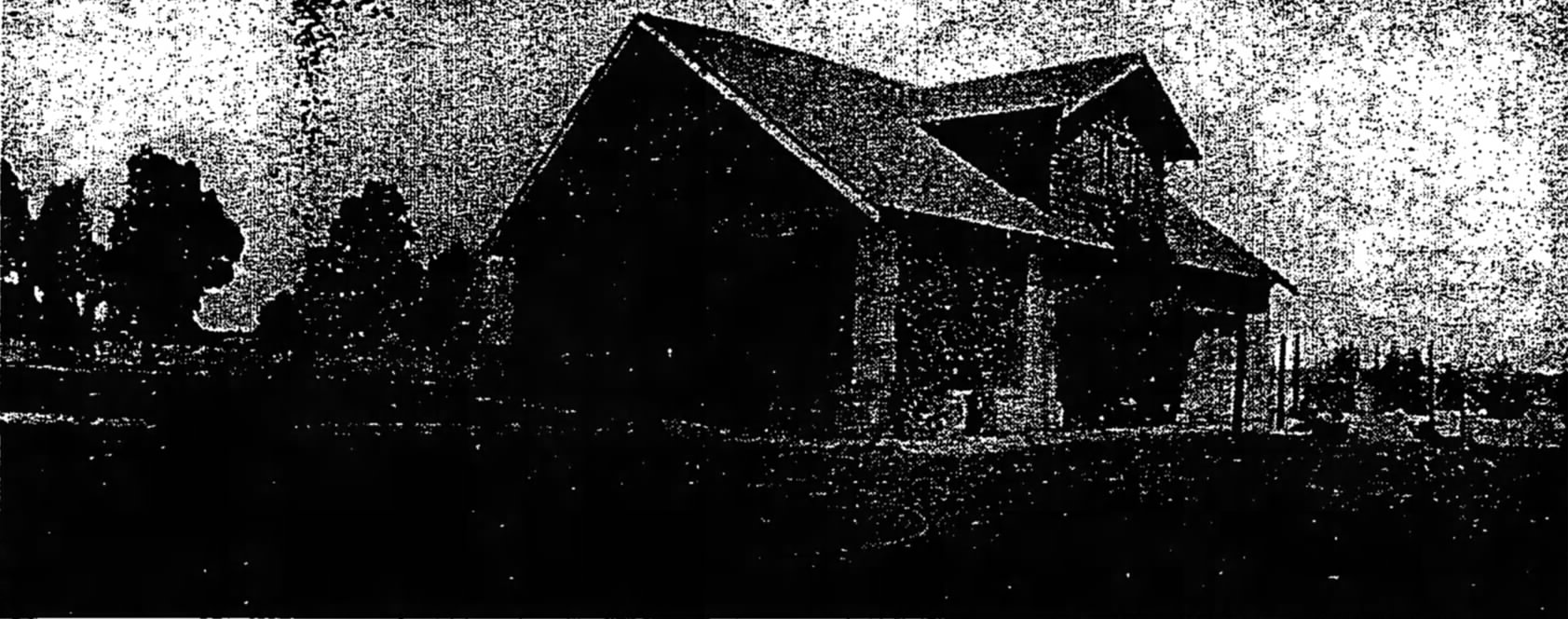
Brown's ranch outside Casa Grande, ca 1921

Brown was born on June 9, 1877, and came to Casa Grande, Arizona in 1908, sent by Southern Pacific to become their agent at the Casa Grande station. He would remain in that position until his retirement in 1942. He owned a 320-acre ranch in the Casa Grande Valley, 9 miles east of Casa Grande, where he grew alfalfa, maize, corn, cotton, barley, and wheat. He also raised Duroc pigs, Holstein cattle, sheep, turkeys, and chicken. His acreage was watered by the first large pumping plant and well in the valley. Erected in 1915, the pump was capable of handling 1800–2000 gallons per minute. Initially, when he purchased the acreage, it was nothing but desert. By 1930, Brown had enlarged his ranch to 700 acres.

Due to his efforts to improve the Casa Grand valley and its infrastructure, as well as his continuous encouragement to entice people to move to the area, he became known as "the father of modern Casa Grande". He was also appointed U. S. Land Commissioner for Pinal County in 1912, after Arizona was granted statehood, by Richard P. Sloan. He served seven consecutive terms, until 1943. He had been re-appointed for an eighth term by Dave W. Ling, but he declined the offer, instead tending his resignation, feeling that "30 years was long enough for anyone to hold an appointive office". Brown was the president of the Casa Grande Valley Water Users' Association. He was involved with the development of the San Carlos Irrigation Project. In 1911, he traveled to Seattle, Washington, to personally escort the Secretary of the Interior, Walter L. Fisher, to Arizona, and go into detail about the necessity of the irrigation project.

== Political career ==
In 1911, the Republicans of Pinal County urged Brown to run for the state senate. He refused to campaign for the position, saying that he was working for the Water User's Association, and while they were paying his salary, he would not take time to campaign. However, if he did receive the nomination, he would accept it. He was unopposed in the Republican primary, and won the general election in December 1911, becoming Arizona's first state senator from Pinal County.

During his time in the Senate he focused on water rights issues. He authored a bill establishing a $20,000,000 bond fund to purchase the bonds issued by state irrigation districts. This bill was deemed in violation of the state constitution by the state attorney general, stating that the constitution prohibited bond issues greater than $350,000. In response, he authored S. B 191, which reorganized state irrigation districts, and establishing the reclamation service. In the legislature's second special session, he authored S. B. 48, which proposed an amendment to the state constitution, allowing the $20,000,000 bond for the reclamation project. When this bill failed to pass the legislature, Brown began working on preparing a referendum on the issue. Eventually, the referendum was put on the ballot for the November 1914 election, reconfigured as a $5,000,000 bond, however, the measure was defeated in the general election.

In 1926, Brown ran on the Republican ticket for Pinal County supervisor. He lost by two votes in the November election, and demanded a recount, which came to the same result, but there were 50 contested ballots, 33 of which had been cast for Denton. Due to the contested ballots, the outcome of the election was given over to the Superior Court. However, in January 1927 Brown withdrew his challenge, which allowed Denton to be re-elected.

After his retirement from his Southern Pacific post, Brown decided to once again try his hand at politics. Arizona was strongly under Democrat control at that time, and Brown got the Republican nomination for state senator. However, he lost to L. E. Canfil in the November election by a margin of greater than 4-1: 941–219.

== Life outside politics ==
In 1912, Brown founded, and was the first editor of the Casa Grande Times, which later merged with the Casa Grande Dispatch in 1914. Also in 1912, Brown began his efforts to create a diversion dam on the Gila River, ten miles north of Florence, which would enable the irrigation of 75,000 acres of farmland. This effort would eventually culminate in the building of the Coolidge Dam in 1924. Brown's tireless efforts over the years to have a dam constructed on the Gila River came to fruition in 1924. Senator Ralph H. Cameron had put forth a bill in the U. S. Senate to appropriate $5,500,000 for construction of the Coolidge Dam, after the senate's passage, the bill was shepherded through the U.S. House of Representatives by Representative Carl Hayden, where it passed unanimously.

In 1920, he and four partners incorporated the Valley Hotel and Investment Corporation, with Brown serving as the first vice-president. The group was formed to manage rental properties, such as hotels, apartments, and bungalow courts.

The First National Bank of Casa Grande opened in 1920, with Brown on their board of directors, as well as being vice-president. In January 1922, Brown was promoted to president of the bank. As an offshoot of the bank, Brown and two other partners incorporated the Guaranty Mortgage Company of Casa Grande in 1922, to handle mortgages in the Casa Grande Valley. Brown was named president of the new corporation. Brown sold the bank in November 1925. In November 1926, Brown organized the Arizona Southwest Bank in Tucson. In 1928 the Arizona Southwest Bank, which had branches in Tucson and Douglas, Arizona, absorbed the First National Bank of Casa Grande. The bank closed in 1931, during the Great Depression. As a result of its closure, Brown was arrested in June 1932, and charged with forgery. He pleaded not guilty, and was held on a $2,000 bond, with a preliminary hearing set for September. Jury selection was held on October 10, and the trial began the following day. The state rested its case on October 12, after which the defense made a motion for an instructed verdict, claiming the state had failed to present a valid case. The judge agreed and dismissed the case.

Brown died in a hospital in Tucson, Arizona on December 19, 1950.
