= Nogales International =

Newspaper published in Nogales, Arizona

- Type: Tuesdays & Fridays Newspaper
- Format: Broadsheet
- Owner: Wick Communications
- Founder: Craig Pottinger
- Publisher: Manuel Coppola
- Editor: Manuel Coppola
- Founded: 1925; 101 years ago
- Language: English
- Headquarters: 268 W. View Point Drive; Nogales, Arizona 85621; United States
- Circulation: 980 (as of 2022)
- ISSN: 2998-0984
- OCLC number: 36034126
- Website: nogalesinternational.com

Nogales International is a newspaper, based in Nogales, Arizona, United States, founded in 1925. It is published on Tuesdays and Fridays and is a division of Wick Communications. Nogales is located on the U.S.–Mexico border. It is 60 miles south of Tucson, Arizona, and 150 miles south of Phoenix, Arizona. The International also publishes The Weekly Bulletin in Sonoita.

Nogales International reports on issues affecting residents of Santa Cruz County, Arizona, including Nogales, Rio Rico, Tumacacori, Tubac, Amado, Patagonia, Sonoita and Elgin. Articles about issues and activities in Nogales, Sonora, Mexico, are also published.

== History ==
On May 25, 1925, Craig Pottinger published the first edition of the weekly Nogales International. He published the paper for 46 years. As his health declined Pottinger sold the paper in 1971. It was purchased by Steve Emerine and Ted Turpin, co-publishers of the Green Valley News. In 1974, James Afinowich bought the International.

In October 1979, the paper expanded into a daily. In April 1980, Pottinger died. In October 1980, the International became a semi-weekly due to rising production costs. In 1982, a judge placed the business into Chapter 7 bankruptcy and turned it over to a creditor for liquidation of assets. At that time Afinowich decided to end the International, which had a 3,000 circulation. A skeleton crew made up of 18 laid-off employees volunteered to put out the final edition. However, a group of local businessmen formed the Appleton Group, which acquired the paper's name and subscription list and relaunched the International, having only missed one issue. The paper was soon acquired by Wick Communications.
