= White Mountain Independent =

Newspaper published in Slow Low, Arizona

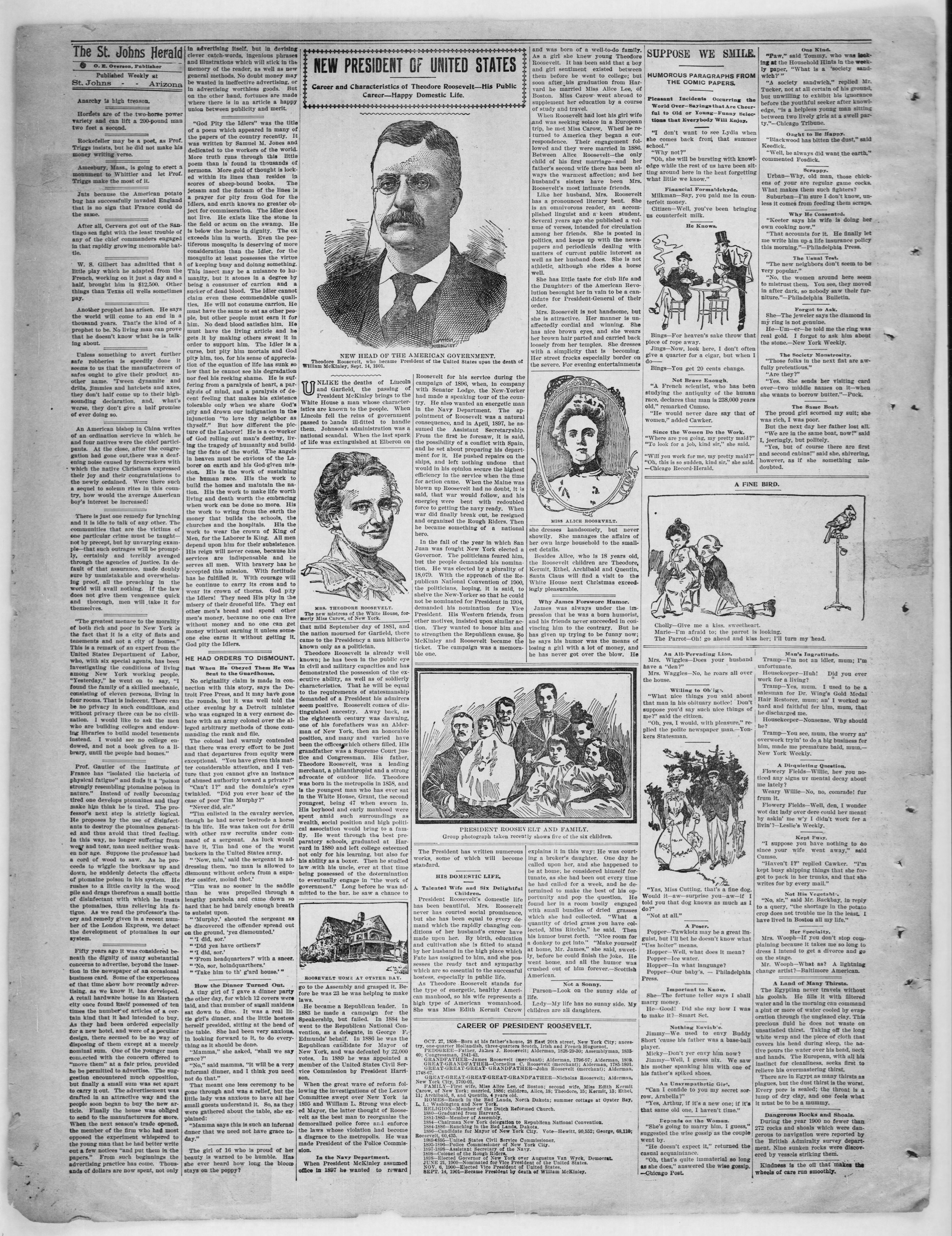
- Cover of paper on January 25, 1902
- Format: Weekly newspaper
- Owner: Casa Grande Valley Newspapers
- Founder: Henry Reed
- Publisher: Brian Kramer
- Editor: Warren Adams-Ockrassa
- General manager: Shannon Bryant
- Founded: January 15, 1885 (as The St. Johns Herald)
- Language: English
- Headquarters: 3191 S. White Mountain Rd. #3; Show Low, AZ 85901
- Country: United States
- ISSN: 2166-9767
- OCLC number: 33314404
- Website: wmicentral.com

The White Mountain Independent is a weekly newspaper published in Show Low, Arizona.

== History ==
On Jan. 15, 1885, Henry Reed published the first edition of The St. Johns Herald in St. Johns, Arizona. He was succeeded as editor by Barry Mathews in April 1886, followed by J.F. Wallace in February 1887. Mathews was fatally shot by a saloon owner in May 1889.

Art McDonald became editor in September 1894, followed by Alfred Ruiz in February 1895, W.H. Burbage in July 1895, J.T. Lesueur in February 1897, George E. Waite in July 1898, and Eli S. Perkins in July 1899.

Reamer Ling joined Perkins as partner in December 1899, and exited the business after 10 months. In January 1901, Perkins sold the Herald to Waite, who was succeeded in March 1901 by O.E. Overson. In September 1901, Perkins and Ling launched a rival paper called the St. Johns Snips.

In December 1901, J.S. Hayden purchased the Herald, and a few weeks later sold it to Perkins and Ling. Overson remained as editor and business manager, and the two papers were consolidated as the Snips-Herald. In May 1903, Perkins purchased the Wickenburg News-Herald, and then sold the Snips-Herald to Loyd C. Henning in July 1903 in order to focus on his other paper.

In October 1904, Ling launched another rival paper called the Apache News. In January 1905, Ling purchased the Snips-Herald from Henning, and consolidated the two paper's under the Herald name. In May 1905, the paper's printing plant was damaged in a flood caused by a dam burst. Overton eventually joined Ling as partner and in May 1910 Waite took over again.

In January 1931, Waite died after operating the Herald for decades. In February 1938, Isaac Barth, owner of the St. Johns Observer, purchased the Herald from Mrs. Bertha and Mrs. J.W. Waite and merged the two to form the St. Johns Herald-Observer. In November 1945, Barth died at age 69. His estate sold the paper in April 1946 to Myrlan G. Brown, owner of the Apache County Independent-News, who then absorbed it into his paper. In November 1947, Brown bought and absorbed the McNary Pine Knot Post, making his the lone newspaper in Apache County at that time.

Brown launched the White Mountain Eagle of Show Low in February 1956, and the White Mountain Roundup of Springerville in September 1957. Later that same month, Brown sold his three papers to Byron D. Box. The papers were acquired by James F. Hudson in September 1961, followed by Victor H. Dittmar in June 1968. Former owner Brown died in November 1969. Dittmar merged the three papers sometime around 1974 to form the White Mountain Independent.

In December 1977, Donovan N. Kramer, owner of the Casa Grande Dispatch, acquired the Independent. In May 1981, Dittmar died. In 1984, D.N. Kramer fired his son Eric Kramer from the Independent over a printing dispute, later rehired him, and then fired him again in January 1985. Eric Kramer claimed his father was mismanaging the business, and when he attempt to see the financial records, his mother called the police and he was arrested for trespassing in December 1986. The charges were later dismissed.

Eric Kramer launched a civil lawsuit and started is own rival paper called the Slow Low Falcon, which his father called a "Mickey Mouse throwaway." By August 1986, the Independent was run by Eric's sister Diana Kramer who managed 13 reporters. The Independent had 8,000 paying subscribers, while the Falcon was mailed for free to 18,600 residents. D.N. Kramer was inducted into the Arizona Newspaper Hall of Fame in 1998, and died in 2009. His widow Ruth A. Kramer continued to manage the business until her death in 2025. At that time the company was passed down to their children.
