= The Winslow Mail =

Former newspaper in Winslow, Arizona

- Type: Weekly newspaper
- Format: Broadsheet
- Owner: Western News & Info
- Founder(s): Edward N. Buck; Charles A. Buck
- Founded: 1894
- Ceased publication: 2007
- Language: English
- Headquarters: Winslow, Arizona

The Winslow Mail was formerly a newspaper in Winslow, Arizona, United States. It was published from 1894 to 2007.

== History ==
In January 1894, the first edition of the Winslow Mail was published. The weekly paper was founded by brothers Edward N. Buck, and Charles A. Buck. In January 1895, the Buck brothers sold the paper to James F. "Uncle Jim" Wallace, who previously owned The St. Johns Herald.

In December 1901, Wallace died from injuries sustained after he was thrown from a buggy. In January 1904, the Mail was sold at public auction for $575 to Frank F. Flickinger. Horace H. Herr was named editor, and he eventually acquired the paper. In December 1904, Herr sold the paper to C.M. Funston, who sold it to Lloyd C. Henning in October 1906. Henning purchased the Holbrook Argus in January 1907, and sold both paper to Wilfred Waddell and John F. Bauer in September 1909.

Floyd Hampton bought the Mail in November 1913. An electrical fire destroyed Hampton's cottage and seriously burned him and one of his children in February 1914. The paper was acquired by J.H. Chapman in July 1915, G.C. Bazell in August 1919, Judge L.V. Root in December 1920, Sam W. Proctor in August 1922, and the Giragi Brothers (Columbus P., Carmel L. and George), publishers of The Tombstone Epitaph, in January 1926. The Epitaph was sold off two months later.

The "Giragi Gang" expanded the Mail from a weekly into a daily in December 1926, and a month later acquired the Holbrook Tribune from the Bryan Brothers. In June 1945, V. Paul Richards purchased the Mail and Holbrook Tribune-News from the Giragi family. His brother, state senator Joseph Morris Richards, co-owned the paper and later became its publisher. In February 1965, Mabel Nagel and her husband and James Nagel bought the paper after J.M. Richards got another job. S.M. Nations was named editor. A few months later the city declared August 13, 1965, as "J. Morris Richards Day." V.P. Richards died that October.

In February 1968, Bruce Wright and Robert L.Cribbs bought the paper. In August 1969, Paul Barger became publisher and editor. In May 1980, a plane crashed in front of the Mail's printing plant. Two people died, and an engine sailed into the plant. In February 1994, Barger's wife and co-publisher, June Elaine Hamm Barger, died. At that time the couple published the Mail, Tribune-News and Snowflake Herald. In June 1998, Western News & Info acquired the Mail. In 2007, the paper ceased after 144 years.
