= West Valley View =

Newspaper in Goodyear, Arizona

- Type: Weekly newspaper
- Owner: Times Media Group
- Founder: Elliott Freireich
- Publisher: Steve T. Strickbine
- Editor: Niki D'Andrea
- Managing editor: Christina Fuoco-Karasinski
- Founded: 1986
- Language: English
- Headquarters: Avondale, Arizona
- Circulation: 69,485 (as of 2022)
- OCLC number: 31717921
- Website: westvalleyview.com

The West Valley View is a newspaper in the Phoenix Metropolitan Area serving the West Valley cities and towns of Avondale, Buckeye, Goodyear, Litchfield Park, Tolleson and Tonopah. It has a controlled circulation of 75,000+ and is published every Wednesday.

== History ==
Elliott Freireich founded the paper in 1986 as a twice-weekly paper, published on Tuesdays and Fridays. The West Valley View replaced the original newspaper serving Avondale/Goodyear which was known as the Westside Enterprise and later the Westsider. The View is not related to those publications other than it covers some of the same communities and that Freireich's parents were owners of the Enterprise for a couple of years in the '60s.

As of July 13, 2017, West Valley View was acquired by Times Media Group, which took over daily operations.
