= Apache Junction News =

Newspaper in Apache Junction, Arizona

Apache Junction & Gold Canyon News
- Type: Weekly Newspaper
- Format: Broadsheet, Online
- Owner(s): Chuck & Pattie Baker
- Founded: 1997
- Language: English
- Headquarters: Apache Junction Pinal County, Arizona
- Circulation: 35,000
- OCLC number: 47227043
- Website: http://www.ajnews.com/

Apache Junction News is a newspaper in Apache Junction, Arizona, United States. It was founded in 1997 by current owners Chuck and Pattie Baker. The paper, now known as The Apache Junction & Gold Canyon News, serves the communities of Apache Junction and Gold Canyon in Pinal County, Arizona.

The newspaper features "The Kollenborn Chronicles", authored by noted author and historian of the Superstition Wilderness Tom Kollenborn. His weekly column in the Apache Junction & Gold Canyon News is published on his blog by Apache Junction library staff one week after publication in the newspaper.
