= San Diego CityBeat =

Newspaper in San Diego, California

- Owner: Times Media Group
- Ceased publication: September 4, 2019
- Headquarters: San Diego, California
- Circulation: 49.750 (2011)

San Diego CityBeat was an alternative weekly newspaper in San Diego, California, that focused on local progressive politics, arts, and music. It was published every Wednesday and distributed around San Diego County, although with a focus on the city of San Diego itself, with a weekly circulation (as of January 2011) of 49,750.

== History ==
Southland Publishing purchased SLAMM magazine, a music biweekly, from publisher Kevin Hellman in 2002. It planned to target young, educated readers in San Diego, an audience whose needs, Southland's owners felt, were not being met by the other two major publications in San Diego, the San Diego Union Tribune and the San Diego Reader. David Rolland, a journalist and editor with more than 10 years experience, was named editor of CityBeat, while Hellman, the former publisher of SLAMM, was named the entertainment/promotions manager of the new weekly. Hellman, who organizes the annual North Park Music Thing music festival and San Diego Music Awards, is the weekly's publisher. CityBeat continues to sponsor the San Diego Music Awards, which was initially organized by Hellman's SLAMM magazine.

Rolland appeared on the Editor's Roundtable, a radio show on local public radio station, KPBS, from 2004. The addition of Rolland and other local editors to the show's guest list led Bob Kittle, then editor of the San Diego Union Tribune editorial page, and the editors of the San Diego Voice and Viewpoint and San Diego Metropolitan magazine, who until then had been the show's only panelists, to leave the show.

Rolland left CityBeat in March 2015. He was replaced by Ron Donoho, who was fired in November 2016 and replaced with Seth Combs.

Times Media Group acquired CityBeat in August 2019, fired Combs within a month, and stopped publishing soon after. As of 2024 the paper remains closed.

== Awards ==
In 2013 and 2014, Kelly Davis and Dave Maass co-authored a series of stories in CityBeat on dozens of deaths in San Diego county jails between 2007 and 2012 and citing its extremely high county-jail mortality rate. In 2014 Davis and Maass won two journalism awards for this reporting: first place for investigative reporting at the Association of Alternative Newsmedia's AAN Awards, and first place for investigative/enterprise reporting in the non-daily category from the San Diego chapter of the Society of Professional Journalists. In 2017, county attorneys subpoenaed Davis for her work, a measure that was seen as city officials stifling criticism and intimidating investigative journalism.
