= Kingman Standard =

Weekly newspaper in Mohave County, Arizona

The Standard Newspaper
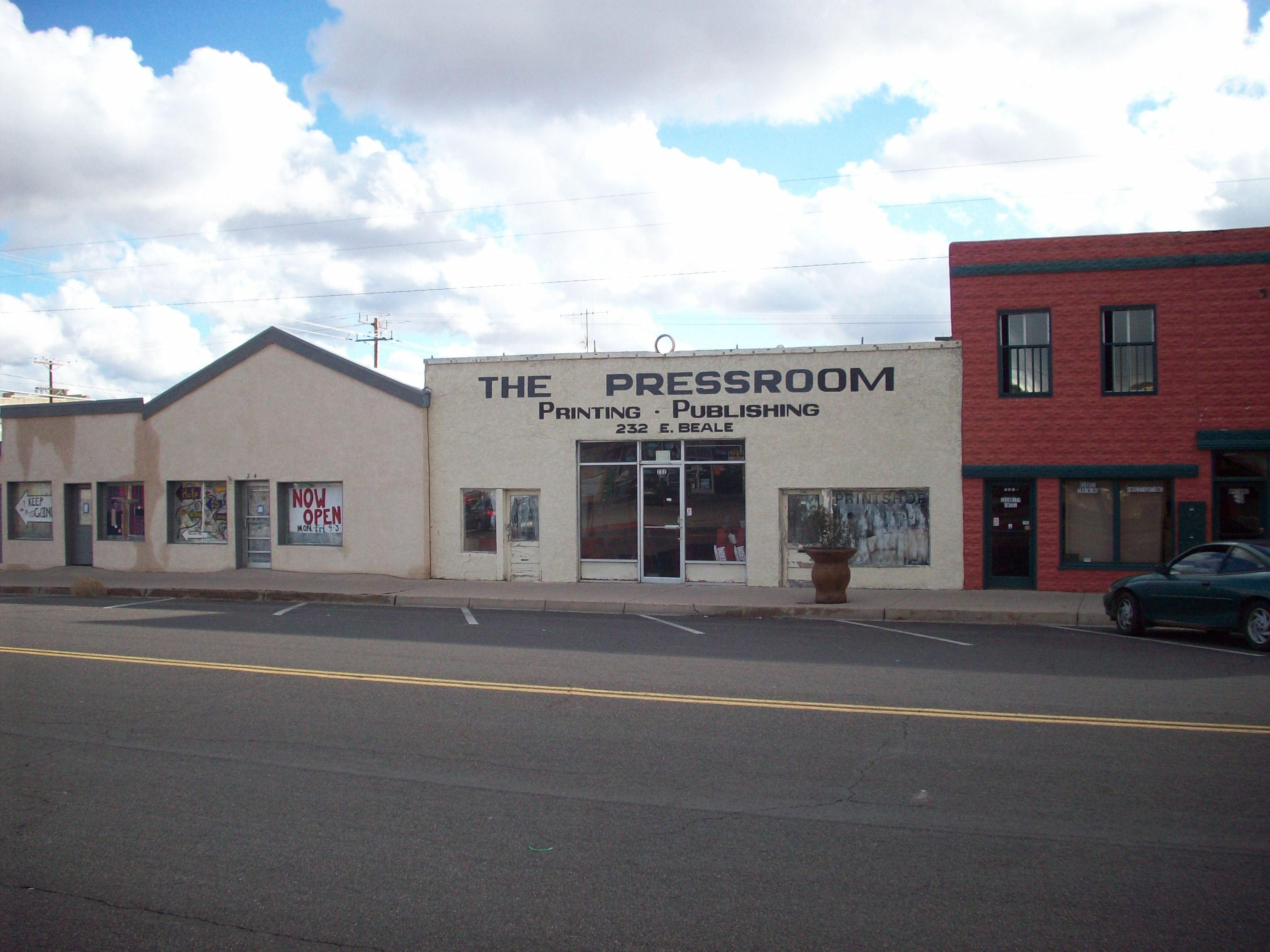
- Press offices of the Kingman Standard in Kingman, AZ.
- Type: Weekly newspaper
- Format: Broadsheet, online
- Publisher: Mathew Wanner
- Editor: Pamela Wanner
- Founded: November 7, 1991
- Headquarters: 221 E. Beale Street, Kingman, AZ 86401 United States
- Circulation: 7,925 (as of 2022)
- OCLC number: 41284168
- Website: thestandardnewspaper.net

The Standard Newspaper (formerly The Kingman Standard), is a local weekly newspaper in Kingman owned by Mohave County Newspapers, Inc. The newspaper is published once a week on Wednesday, and is distributed in Kingman, Bullhead City, Lake Havasu City and Laughlin, Nevada.

== History ==
The Standard Newspaper was founded in November of 1991 by Don Wanner and Matthew Wanner. In 1998, the newspaper became a county-wide publication and was incorporated under the name of Mohave County Newspapers, Inc. The name was also changed from The Kingman Standard to The Standard Newspaper.

== Associated Brands ==
The Standard Newspaper is associated with several brands, including: Senior Living of Mohave County, Everything Kingman, and Mohave County Business Journal.
