= The Daily Courier (Arizona) =

Newspaper in Yavapai County, Arizona

- Type: Daily newspaper
- Format: Broadsheet
- Owner: Western News & Info
- Founder: John H. Marion
- Publisher: Megan Smith
- Editor: Tim Wiederaenders
- Founded: 1882
- Language: English
- Headquarters: Prescott, Arizona, United States
- Circulation: 10,875 Daily; 13,760 Sunday; (as of 2022)
- OCLC number: 34038415
- Website: dcourier.com

The Daily Courier is a newspaper for Yavapai County, Arizona, owned by Western News & Info. The paper features local, regional, national, and international news and opinions. In addition to its primary circulation in Prescott, Arizona, subsidiary editions are also published throughout Yavapai County, including in Prescott Valley, Chino Valley, and Camp Verde.

The Daily Courier was known as Prescott Morning Courier (1881–1909), Prescott Evening Courier (1909), Prescott Courier (1909–1920), Prescott Evening Courier (1920–1970), Prescott Courier (1970–1981), Courier (1981–1987), and Prescott Courier (1987–1994).

== History ==
In 1882, John H. Marion founded the Prescott Morning Courier. Marion died suddenly in 1891. J. Ralph Dillon and E.A. Rogers bought the paper a few months later. Dillion retied in 1896 and sold his half-interest to Rogers. In 1920, Rogers sold the paper to attorneys A.H. Favour and Howard W. Cornick, who expanded it into an afternoon daily called the Prescott Evening Courier.

In 1922, editor W.P. "Bill" Stuart became the paper's sole owner. Stuart published the paper for the next three decades. In 1958, he sold the Courier to a new corporation operated by Donald N. Soldwedel and the other owners of the Yuma Daily Sun. In 1978, a holding company called Western News & Info was established and Soldwedel was named president. The Soldwedel family owned all the stock.
