= Arizona Miner =

Former newspaper published in Prescott, Arizona

- Arizona Miner, March 9, 1864
- Type: Weekly newspaper
- Founded: 1864
- Ceased publication: 1868
- Language: English
- Headquarters: Prescott, Arizona, Arizona Territory
- ISSN: 2165-9206
- OCLC number: 9251680

Weekly Arizona Miner
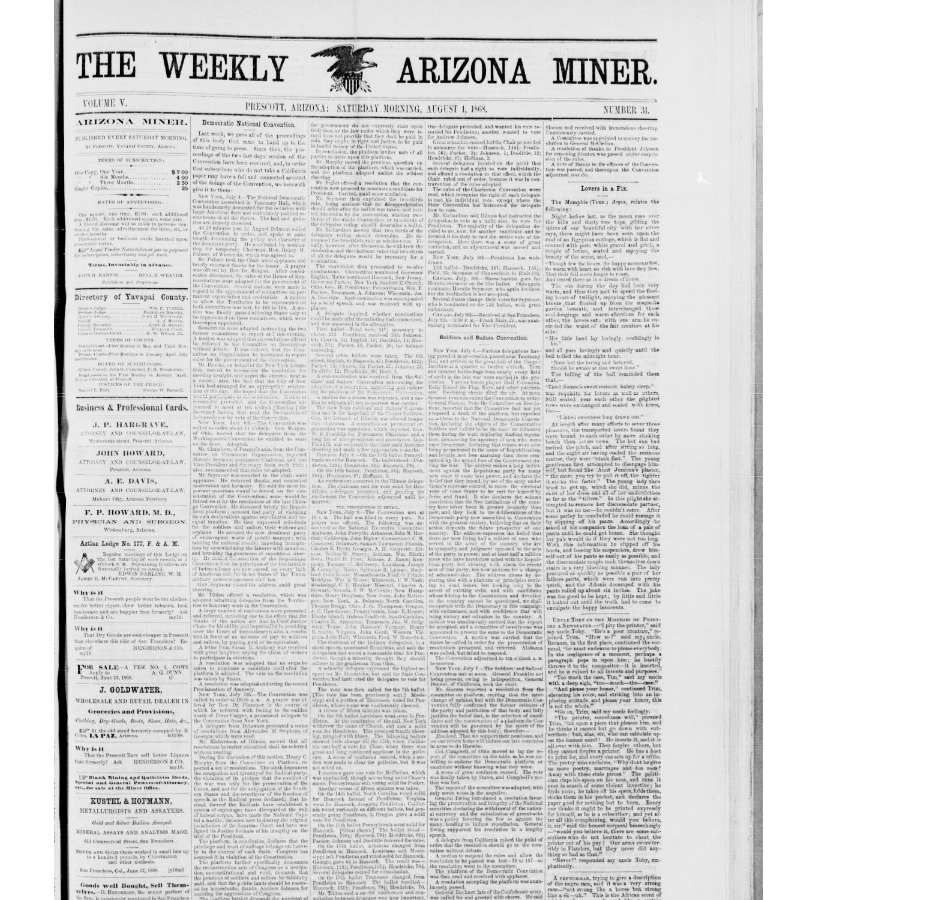
- Weekly Arizona Miner, August 8, 1868
- Founded: 1868
- Ceased publication: 1873
- ISSN: 2165-9060
- OCLC number: 8793533

Arizona Weekly Miner
- Arizona Weekly Miner, January 2, 1874
- Founded: 1874
- Ceased publication: 1877
- ISSN: 2165-9052
- OCLC number: 8793499

The Weekly Arizona Miner
- The Weekly Arizona Miner, June 8, 1877
- Founded: 1877
- Ceased publication: 1885
- ISSN: 2165-9044
- OCLC number: 8793462

Arizona Weekly Journal-Miner
- Arizona Weekly Journal-Miner, January 1, 1886
- Founded: 1885
- Ceased publication: 1903
- ISSN: 2166-5877
- OCLC number: 13019318

Weekly Arizona Journal-Miner
- Weekly Arizona Journal-Miner, March 3, 1903
- Founded: 1903
- Ceased publication: 1908
- ISSN: 2166-5893
- OCLC number: 12956138

Weekly Journal-Miner
- Weekly Journal-Miner, September 20, 1908
- Founded: 1908
- Ceased publication: 1934
- ISSN: 2166-5915
- OCLC number: 12956074

Arizona Miner (alternatively the Arizona Weekly Miner, Miner, or Weekly Miner) was a newspaper published in Prescott, Arizona Territory, from 1868 to 1885 and circulated throughout Yavapai County. The paper merged with the Arizona Weekly Journal in 1885 to create the Arizona Weekly Journal-Miner, which was published until 1934. It underwent a succession of owners and changes in its publishing frequency and political leanings.

== History ==
The predecessor paper, the Republican Fort Whipple Arizona Miner, was established in 1864 at Fort Whipple as a monthly. It was owned by then Territorial Secretary Richard C. McCormick, who purchased a press in Santa Fe, New Mexico, on his initial journey to the territory and transported it in government wagons and other personal belongings. The first publisher was Tisdale A. Hand. The first issue was published on March 9, 1864, making it the oldest newspaper in Arizona. The paper was published under military protection by staff who had "rifles strapped to their backs." Later that year, after the first six issues, McCormick moved the publication to Prescott, the new capital of the Territory. Emmet A. Bentley, editor from July 1866, was shot by Apache Indians on Weaver Mountain in February 1867 and died a few days later in the paper's office at age 27. Bentley was born in Burlington, Iowa and came to Arizona in 1863.

Although McCormick established the paper as "the creature of the new territorial government," the paper had little political content in its early years, aside from reporting on the reelection of President Lincoln in 1864 and meetings of the Arizona Territorial Legislature. Still, William F. Turner, the Chief Justice of the Territorial Supreme Court of Arizona and a political foe, felt that McCormick unduly benefited from being the owner and controller of the Miner.

In 1867, McCormick sold the paper to John H. Marion, a native of New Orleans, Louisiana, who came to Arizona in his 20s to prospect. He stayed to promote mining and Arizona's political rights. During Marion's tenure, the paper became highly politicized. Marion, a Democrat, was said to have a "combative and racist perspective that made itself known through his often aggressive and biting criticism of others." Marion intended the Miner to be both "The Official Paper of Arizona" and an "Organ of the White People of Arizona." Marion published weekly beginning in August 1867 and said he grew the paper from a circulation of less than 75 with a half column of paid advertising to 672 with "several columns" of paid advertising.

In 1868, Benjamin H. Weaver joined the publishing staff, and the paper's frequency increased from semi-monthly to weekly; it was also renamed the Weekly Arizona Miner. After Weaver left in 1874, the paper was renamed the Arizona Weekly Miner. Over the next few years, the staff changed again, with Thomas J. Butler becoming editor and part-owner in 1875, then selling his interest in 1876. Charles W. Beach thereafter assumed the editor duties, and Marion sold his interest to Beach in 1877. Under Beach, the paper's political leanings returned to their Republican roots, and the name was changed to the Weekly Arizona Miner. In 1882, Beach planned to sell the paper to Samuel N. Holmes, but Holmes died before the deal was signed.

== Merger ==
Despite ongoing financial difficulties, Beach continued publishing the newspaper for several years. In late 1885, John C. Martin, the editor of Prescott's Arizona Weekly Journal, (Note: Established in 1880 as the Arizona Democrat before becoming the Arizona Weekly Journal in 1882) proposed a merger deal. The two papers combined created the Arizona Weekly Journal-Miner, with Martin as editor.

== Later history ==
A fire on July 14, 1900, destroyed the publishing office. In response, a temporary daily was published for about a month until regular operations could resume in a small brick building on West Gurley Street.

In 1903, the paper's name was again changed to the Weekly Arizona Journal-Miner. In 1904, the paper began using a linotype machine and became a franchise of the Associated Press.

In 1908, John W. Milnes purchased the paper and became editor; he changed the name to the Weekly Journal-Miner. Milnes retained control of the paper for nearly fifteen years. Needing more space, the publishing office moved to a two-story building at Cortez and Union streets in 1914 with a Goss web-perfecting press.

The last proprietors of the paper were Arthur John Doud, publisher, and A. V. Napier, manager, who acquired the publication on July 1, 1929, and operated it until its closure in April 1934.

== Daily edition ==
From December 1873 (Note: Some sources say the daily began in 1876) to August 1885, a daily edition, the Arizona Daily Miner, was also published. The Arizona Journal, a Republican-leaning paper established in 1883, merged with the Daily Miner to become the Prescott Journal-Miner.

== Mastheads ==
Masthead	Frequency			Notes
Republican Fort Whipple Arizona Miner	monthly	1864	1868	
Weekly Arizona Miner	weekly	1868	1874	
Arizona Weekly Miner	weekly	1874	1877	
Weekly Arizona Miner	weekly	1877	1885	
Arizona Weekly Journal-Miner	weekly	1885	1903	after merger
Weekly Arizona Journal-Miner	weekly	1903	1908	after merger
Weekly Journal-Miner	weekly	1908	1934	closure

== Key people ==
Name			position
Richard C. McCormick	1864	1867	owner
Tisdale A. Hand	Mar 1864	Oct 1864	publisher
Emmet A. Bentley	Jul 1866	Feb 1867	editor
Randall Meacham	Feb 1867	Jul 1867	editor
William Ford	Jul 1867	Sep 1867	publisher
John H. Marion	Sep 1867	1877	editor/owner/part-owner
Benjamin H. Weaver	1868	Feb 1875	editor/part-owner
E.S. Penewell	Dec 1873	Feb 1875	part-owner
C.F. Mitchell	Dec 1873	Feb 1875	part-owner
Thomas J. Butler	Feb 1875	Dec 1876	editor/part-owner
Charles W. Beach	Dec 1876	Mar 1877	editor/part-owner
Charles W. Beach	Mar 1877	1884	editor/owner
William O. O'Neill	1884	Feb 1885	editor
Charles W. Beach	Mar 1885	Aug 1885	editor/owner
John C. Martin	Sep 1885	Mar 1904	editor/owner
John W. Milnes	Apr 1904	Jun 1929	editor/owner
Arthur John Doud	Jul 1929	Apr 1934	owner/publisher
A. V. Napier	Jul 1929	Apr 1934	managing editor
