= Arizona Range News =

Newspaper in Willcox, Arizona, US

- Type: Weekly newspaper
- Owner: Wick Communications
- Founder(s): Phil Montague; George McFarlin
- Founded: 1884 (as Sulphur Valley News)
- Language: English
- Headquarters: Willcox, Arizona
- Circulation: 2,650
- OCLC number: 31613557
- Website: willcoxrangenews.com

Arizona Range News is a weekly newspaper in Willcox, Arizona, United States. It is owned and published by Wick Communications.

== History ==
In May 1884, Phil Montague and George McFarlin founded the Sulphur Valley News in Willcox, Arizona. A few months later the News merged with the Arizona Livestock Journal to form Southwestern Stockman.

In January 1887, Dan N. Hunsaker assumed control. In December 1890, Hunsaker died. In February 1891, Charles W. Pugh bought the paper from his estate. On April 3, 1894, Pugh relaunched the Sulphur Valley News.

In August 1896, Horace E. Dunlap bought the News, and renamed it to the Arizona Range News in January 1897. C.O. Anderson sold the Holbrook Argus and bought the News in May 1900. S.N. Kemp and his brothers acquired the paper in December 1902. Anderson reacquired the News in September 1917, and was succeeded by L.J. Fulmer in June 1926, E.H. Beverly bought the paper in August 1929, who was then elected Willcox mayor in April 1940.

The paper was purchased by Dale F. Mullenbruch in October 1940, followed by Clayton A. Smith and George A. Bideaux in January 1946. The sale included the San Pedro Valley News of Benson. Smith published The Tombstone Epitaph and Bideaux edited the Southwest Veteran of Tucson and was a former secretary of Sen. Ernest W. McFarland. In April 1948, Bideaux became sole owner of the News. C.O. Steppe soon became a co-owner, but was bought out by D.F. Mullenbruch in January 1950. His wife Ruth Mullenbruch acquired full ownership in March 1955.

Grady Hollifield become a co-owner at some point and sold out to Clyde S. Roberts in May 1958. Ruth Mullenbruch was bought out by Roberts in January 1959. A new printing press was installed at the paper's plant In March 1960. Roberts was elected president of the Arizona Newspaper Association in January 1975. Former owner Bideaux died in August 1978. Wick Communications acquired the paper from Roberts in 1981.
