= Casa Grande Dispatch =

Newspaper in Casa Grande, Arizona

- Type: Thrice-weekly newspaper
- Format: Broadsheet
- Owner: Casa Grande Valley Newspapers Inc.
- Founder: J. F. Brown
- Founded: January 1912 (as Casa Grande Times)
- Language: English
- Headquarters: 200 West Second Street; Casa Grande, Arizona 85122, United States
- Circulation: 5,606 (as of 2022)
- OCLC number: 16877473
- Website: trivalleycentral.com

The Casa Grande Dispatch is an American newspaper published Tuesdays, Thursdays and Saturdays in Casa Grande, Arizona. The paper is circulated in Casa Grande and Pinal County. It originated in 1912 and has been published by Casa Grande Valley Newspapers Inc. since 1963.

== History ==
In January 1912, the Casa Grande Times was founded by J. F. Brown. Evans T. Richardson was the paper's first publisher and editor. After a year, Richardson acquired the paper, and sold it in June 1913 to Wainwright "Bunny" Randall.

In September 1913, a rival paper called the Casa Grande Bulletin was founded by Angela Hutchinson Hammer and Ted Healy. Hammer left after a few months. In January 1914, she started a third paper called the Casa Grande Valley Dispatch, which quickly absorbed the Times from Randall.

In 1924, Hammer sold the Dispatch to A.C. Wrenn, owner of the Arizona Blade Tribune. His son Harold H. Wrenn was put in charge of the Dispatch. In 1928, Wrenn acquired the Bulletin from Healy and merged it into the Dispatch. The paper was acquired by E.C. Grasty in January 1930, followed nine months later by William R. Mathews and Ralph Ellinwood in August 1930. At that time, A.N. Boyd was put in charge. E.H. Boyd soon became editor and owner. In 1935, Healy died.

In 1941, E.H. Boyd sold the Dispatch and the Coolidge News to Thomas L. Robinson. The Dispatch was acquired by Clyde A. Eckman in 1946, followed by C.W. Cleary in 1948. Dispatch founder Angie Hammer died in 1952. The paper was sold to Walter A. Averill in 1954, Donald N. Soldwedel in 1960, and Donovan M. Kramer in 1963. Hammer became the first woman inducted Arizona Newspaper Hall of Fame in 1965. Kramer was also was inducted into the hall of fame in 1998, and died in 2009. His widow Ruth A. Kramer continued to manage the business until her death in 2025. At that time the Dispatch was passed down to their children.
