= Sierra Vista Herald =

Newspaper in Cochise County, Arizona

The Herald / Review
- Type: Tri-weekly newspaper
- Format: tall tab
- Owner: Wick Communications
- Publisher: Jennifer L. Sorenson
- Editor: Timothy J. Woods
- Founded: 1955; 71 years ago
- Language: English
- Headquarters: 102 Fab Avenue; Sierra Vista, AZ 85635; United States
- Circulation: 4,392 Daily; 6,364 Sunday (as of 2022)
- ISSN: 8750-3891
- Website: myheraldreview.com

The Sierra Vista Herald / Bisbee Daily Review is a newspaper printed in Sierra Vista, Arizona, United States. Most of its circulation goes to Sierra Vista, Huachuca City, Hereford, Palominas, and Fort Huachuca. It is also circulated in Bisbee.

== History ==
Ky Richards Jr. and his wife, Lois Richards, originally from Hawaii, started printing the Huachuca Herald on Fridays starting October 7, 1955. They put out the first editions on a typewriter, composing stories on their kitchen table. On October 8, 1967, the couple started printing the paper twice a week. At that time, the newspaper hit the streets on Sundays and Wednesdays.

On May 22, 1968, the couple sold the newspaper to Sig H. Atkinson of Chandler and Milton I. Wick, co-founder of Wick Communications. The Sierra Vista Herald started publishing via offset with 3,000 subscribers in 1968. In 1969, the Herald merged with the Douglas Daily Dispatch, forming the Sierra Vista Herald-Dispatch.

In 1971, Bill Epler bought the Bisbee Daily Review from Phelps Dodge and changed it from a daily to a weekly. In 1974, he sold it to the Wick family. On October 5, 1976, the Review was merged into the Herald-Dispatch and publishing was expanded from three to five days a week. At that time the combined circulation was over 10,000.

The newspaper added Associated Press wire service news. On June 14, 1981, a Sunday edition was added. In 2004, the Herald / Review changed into a morning, seven-days-a-week newspaper. In 2017, the print schedule was reduced to five days a week, and then to three days in 2020.

== Building ==
The Herald building has undergone a series of additions since the first office was built at 102 Fab Avenue in 1961. It was expanded by 1,800 square feet (170 m2) in 1968. In 1975, a new press room and business offices were added, with the area of the building going from 4,907 square feet (455.9 m2) up to 8,400 square feet (780 m2). In 1985, extra newsprint storage was needed, so an additional 1,862 square feet (173.0 m2) was added. In 1996 the front office/classified spaces/spaced was built. In 2004, a new press room facility opened. The Hager Building at 400 Veterans Drive added 9,100 square feet (850 m2) to the newspaper's still-growing facilities. Along with the new building came a new press with more color capability and a higher printing speed.
