= Tucson Weekly =

Newspaper in Arizona

- Type: Alternative weekly
- Format: Tabloid
- Owner: Times Media Group
- Founded: 1984; 42 years ago
- Headquarters: Tucson, Arizona, United States
- Circulation: 33,000 (2019)
- ISSN: 0742-0692
- Website: tucsonweekly.com

The Tucson Weekly is an alternative newsweekly that was founded in 1984 by Douglas Biggers and Mark Goehring, and serves the Tucson, Arizona, metropolitan area of about 1,000,000 residents.

The paper is a member of the Association of Alternative Newsmedia. New issues arrive at kiosks throughout Tucson every Wednesday. Jim Nintzel is the current editor. Staff members include Logan Burtch-Buus, Tirion Morris, Christopher Boan, Jeff Gardner, Kathleen Kunz and Chelo Grubb.

== History ==
The founding editor was Douglas Biggers, who served as editor and publisher and also founded Edible Baja Arizona. He sold the paper to Wick Communications in 2000.

Longtime editor Jimmy Boegle left the Weekly in late 2012 to start his own independent paper in Palm Springs, California.

In 2014, Wick sold the paper to 10/13 Communications. In 2021, Times Media Group acquired the Tucson publications of 10/13 Communications (including The Explorer, the Marana News, Foothills News, Desert Times, Tucson Weekly, and Inside Tucson Business).

== Notable journalists ==
Former editors include Dan Huff, Carol Ann Bassett, James Reel, Michael Parnell, Dan Gibson and Mari Herreras. Longtime Weekly and Arizona Daily Star reporter Chris Limberis was posthumously inducted into the Arizona Newspaper Association Hall of Fame in 2006.

== Red Meat ==
The Tucson Weekly was a launching point for the comic strip Red Meat, created by Tucsonan Max Cannon in 1989.

== See also ==
- List of alternative weekly newspapers
