= Eastern Arizona Courier =

Weekly newspaper in Safford, AZ

- Format: Weekly newspaper
- Owner: Wick Communications
- Founder: John J. Birdno
- Publisher: Ian Kirkwood
- Editor: Tom Bodus
- Founded: 1895 (as the Graham Guardian)
- Language: English
- City: Safford, Arizona
- Country: United States
- Circulation: 4,125 Wednesday; 3,700 Saturday (as of 2022)
- OCLC number: 31345114
- Website: eacourier.com

The Eastern Arizona Courier is a weekly newspaper published in Safford, Arizona. Its roots go back to March 1895, when it was founded as the Graham Guardian by the Guardian Publishing Company, and edited by John J. Birdno.

== History ==
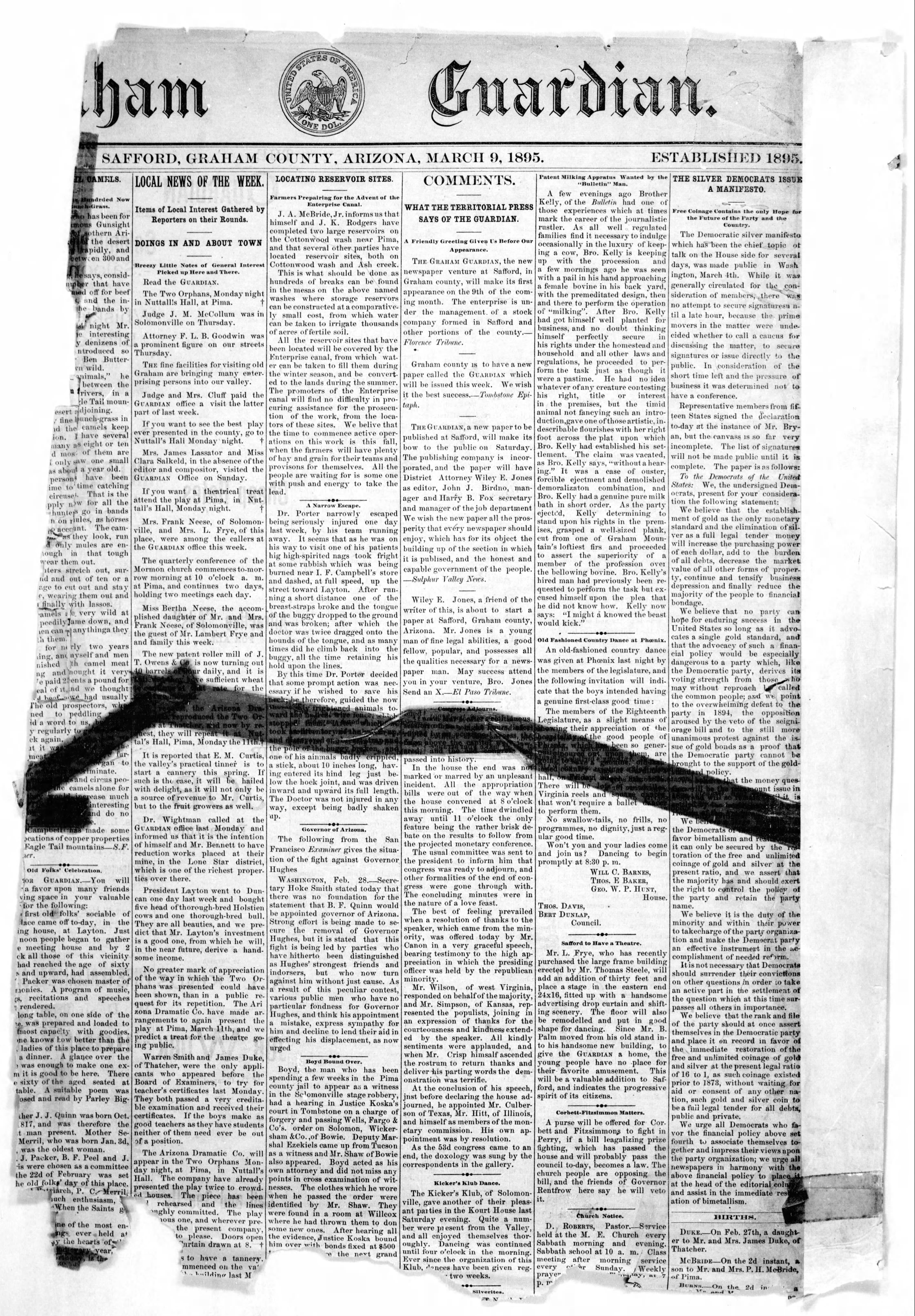
The front page of the first issue of the Graham Guardian

On March 9, 1895, John J. Birdno published the first edition of the Graham Guardian in Safford, Arizona. Birdno was the paper's editor and manager, and he co-founded it with district attorney Wiley E. Jones and Harry Fox. The paper was seen by some as an organ of the Church of Jesus Christ of Latter-day Saints.

Birdno eventually became the sole owner, and under him, the Guardian aggressively supported the US Democratic Party. At different times, Birdno served as an assessor for the county and a receiver for the Land Office. In July 1913, Birdno leased the paper to John F. Weber.

In 1916, Perry A. Burke founded the Gila Valley Farmer in Pima, Arizona. In March 1918, Guardian founder Birdno died. In January 1920, the Farmer relocated to Safford. In April 1920, David H. Gloss bought the Farmer, and sold it that September to J.B. Price and E.R. Carpenter.

W. M. Moore bought the Guardian from Weber in December 1920. Clyde W. Ijams became a co-owner in September 1921 and the paper was expanded from a weekly to a semi-weekly in February 1922. The Guardian in March 1922 acquired and absorbed the Farmer.

In 1923, William B. Kelly, publisher of the Clifton Copper Era, purchased the Guardian. In 1939, Kelly served as executive secretary to Gov. Robert Taylor Jones. In 1943, Kelly sold the Guardian to the Gila Printing and Publishing Company, which was mostly owned by the paper's employees. Ivan Bently was company president.

In 1967, Robert E. Gentry established the Eastern Arizona Courier in Safford. In 1975, Gentry acquired the Guardian from Gila Printing, which was owned by Louis F. Long. The Guardian was then merged into the Courier. In 1983, Gentry sold the paper to Wick Communications and died a year later. In 2025, Wick announced it was looking to sell the paper.
