= Navajo-Hopi Observer =

Newspaper in Flagstaff, Arizona

- Type: Weekly newspaper
- Format: Broadsheet; Internet
- Owner: River City Newspapers
- Publisher: Blake DeWitt
- Editor: Loretta McKenney
- Headquarters: 118 S. 3rd Street; Williams, AZ 86046; United States
- Circulation: 15,000 (as of 2022)
- Website: nhonews.com

The Navajo-Hopi Observer is a weekly newspaper serving the Hopi and Navajo nations and the city of Flagstaff in northern Arizona.
