= Western News & Info =

Newspaper publisher in Arizona, United States

Western News & Info, Inc.
- Company type: Private
- Industry: Media
- Headquarters: Prescott Valley, Arizona, United States
- Website: westernnews.com

Western News & Info, Inc. is a multi-media company owned by the Soldwedel family. In 2016, the company headquarters moved from Yuma, Arizona to Prescott Valley, Arizona.
