= List of defunct newspapers of the United States =

Thousands of United States newspapers have gone out of business. Some of the more notable ones are listed here, primarily major metropolitan dailies that have been published for 10 years or longer. (Some smaller papers, like those located in small towns, had a notable influence on their communities and may also be included.)

Newspapers are sorted by distribution and state and labeled with the city of publication if not evident from the name.

There are also lists of newspapers for each US state, each with a section on defunct newspapers in that state. These lists often include titles missing below.

== National ==
- Daily Worker (1924–1958)
- The National (1990–1991)
- National Anti-Slavery Standard (1840–1870)
- The National Era (1847–1860, abolitionist)
- Negro World (1914–1933)
- Police Gazette (1845–1977)
- The Spotlight (1975–2001)

== Metropolitan and local ==
=== Alabama ===
- Alabama Journal (Montgomery) (1940–1993)
- Birmingham Post-Herald (1850–2005)
- Daily Rebel (Selma) (1865)
- The Hoover Gazette (2006–2007)
- The Meteor, Alabama Insane Hospital (1872–1881)
- The Mobile Morning News (c. 1865)

=== Alaska ===
- Anchorage Times
- Insurgent49
- Tundra Times

=== Arizona ===
- Ádahooníłígíí
- The Argus (Holbrook) (1895–1900)
- The Bachelor's Beat
- Bisbee Daily Review (Bisbee) (1901–1971)
- The Border Vidette (Nogales) (1894–1934)
- El Fronterizo (Tucson) (1878–1930s)
- The Holbrook News (Holbrook)
- Mohave County Miner (Mineral Park, 1882–1887; Kingman, 1887–1974), called Mohave County Miner and Our Mineral Wealth between 1918 (after merger with Our Mineral Wealth) and 1922.
- Our Mineral Wealth (Kingman, 1893–1918), merged with Mohave County Miner in 1918.
- Phoenix Gazette (1881–1997)
- The Rep
- The St. Johns Herald (1885–1903; 1917–1938),
  - Snips and St. Johns Herald (1903–1905),
  - St. Johns Herald and Apache News (1905–1917),
  - St. Johns Herald-Observer (1938–1946),
  - Apache County Independent-News and Herald-Observer (1946–1956)
- Tucson Citizen (1870–2009)
- Weekly Arizonian

=== Arkansas ===
- Arkansas Gazette (Little Rock) (1819–1991)

=== California ===
- Alameda Times-Star
- Anaheim Bulletin
- Antioch Daily Ledger
  - Pittsburg Post-Dispatch, merged with the Daily Ledger on October 1, 1990
- The Argus (Fremont)
- Beverly Hills Post
- Burbank Daily Review (1948–1969)
- Byron Times
- Weekly Butte Democrat (Oroville), 1859–1862
- California Eagle (Los Angeles)
- The Californian (San Francisco)
- Chung Sai Yat Po (San Francisco, in Chinese)
- La Crónica (Los Angeles, in Spanish, 1872–1892)
- Clovis Independent
- Hayward Daily Review
- Daily Star-Progress (La Habra)
- Dinuba Sentinel
- Evening Outlook (Santa Monica)
- Fortuna Advance (Fortuna) (existed in 1905)
- Fullerton News Tribune
- The Golden Era (San Francisco)
- Hispano América (San Francisco, in Spanish, 1917–1934)
- Hokubei Mainichi Newspaper (San Francisco, in Japanese)
- Hollywood Citizen (1931–1970)
- Hollywood Star
- The Home Alliance
- Los Angeles Illustrated Daily News
- Los Angeles Examiner (1903–1962)
- Los Angeles Express (1871–1931)
- Los Angeles Herald Examiner (1962–1989)
- Los Angeles Herald-Express (1931–1962)
- Los Angeles Mirror
- Los Angeles Record (1895–1933)
- Los Angeles Saturday Night (1920–1934, illustrated weekly by Samuel Travers Clover)
- Los Angeles Star / La Estrella de Los Ángeles (bilingual English/Spanish, 1851–1879)
- Napa Sentinel
- The Nevada Journal (Nevada City)
- Nichi Bei Times (San Francisco, in Japanese)
- North County Times (Escondido)
- Oakland Tribune
- OC Weekly
- Oxnard Press-Courier
- The Pacific Ensign
- Progress Bulletin (Pomona)
- Sacramento Union (1851–1994)
- San Bruno Herald
- San Diego Daily Journal (1944–1950)
- San Francisco Bay Guardian
- San Francisco Call (1856–1913)
- San Francisco Evening Bulletin (1929–1959)
- San Francisco Frontiers (1994–2002)
- The San Francisco News (1903–1959)
- San Mateo County Times
- San Mateo Daily News
- Sanger Herald
- La Sociedad (San Francisco, in Spanish, 1869–1895)
- Viet Mercury (San Jose, in Vietnamese)
- La Voz de Méjico (San Francisco, in Spanish, 1862–1866)

=== Colorado ===
- Cherry Creek Pioneer (Denver) (1859)
- Colorado Mountaineer (established 1875)
- Colorado Springs Sun
- Rocky Mountain News (Denver) (1859–2009)
- Rolling Stock (Boulder)

=== Connecticut ===
- Bridgeport Evening Farmer (1866–1917)
- Farmington Valley Herald
- The Hartford Times (1817–1976)
- Manchester Herald
- The Meriden Journal
- The New Haven Courier
- Waterbury Democrat
- Winsted Evening Citizen

=== Delaware ===
- The Wilmington Mercury (1798)

=== Florida ===
- Boca Raton News
- The Clearwater Sun (1914–1989)
- Evening Independent (1906–1986)
- Jacksonville Journal
- The Miami News (1896–1988)
- Pasco News
- Sarasota Journal (1952–1982)
- Tampa Times (1893–1982)
- Tampa Tribune

=== Georgia ===
- Atlanta Georgian (1906–1939)
- Atlanta Southern Confederacy
- Cherokee Phoenix (1828–1834)
- Daily Intelligencer (Atlanta)
- Daily Sun
- The Great Speckled Bird (Atlanta) (1968–1976)
- The Luminary

=== Hawaii ===
- Hawaii Holomua (Honolulu) (1891–1895)
- Hilo Tribune (1895–1917)
- The Honolulu Advertiser (1856–2010)
- Honolulu Star-Bulletin (1882–2010)
- Honolulu Weekly
- Molokai Island Times
- Pacific Commercial Advertiser (Honolulu) (1856–1888)
- Polynesian (Honolulu) (1844–1864)

=== Idaho ===
- Bingham County News (Blackfoot) (1918–1930)
- Blackfoot Optimist (1907–1918)
- Camas Prairie Chronicle (Cottonwood) (1901–1917)
- Idaho Falls Free Press
- Idaho Observer (1997–2010)

=== Illinois ===
- Champaign-Urbana Courier
- Chicago Daily News (1875–1978)
- The Chicago Day Book (1911–1917)
- Chicago Democrat (1857)
- Chicago Evening Post
- Chicago Inter Ocean
- Chicago Press and Tribune (1857)
- Chicago Times
- Chicago's American (1900–1939)
- Commercial Bulletin (Troy)
- Congregational Herald (Chicago) (1857)
- Daily Commercial Bulletin (Chicago)
- Dziennik Narodowy (Chicago) (1899–1923)
- Free West
- Idisher ḳuryer : The Daily Jewish Courier (Chicago) (1887–1940s)
- Metro-East Journal (East St. Louis)
- The Northwestern Lumberman, Chicago
- Pochodeň (Chicago) (1896–1899)
- Post Amerikan (Bloomington-Normal)
- Skandinaven (Chicago)
- Springfield Republican-American
- Telegraf (Chicago) (1892–1900s)
- Vorbote (Chicago) (1874–1924)
- Western Citizen (Chicago) (1850s)

=== Indiana ===
- Amateur Reporter (Washington) (1882–1883)
- The Andrews Signal (1893–1952)
- Blackford County Democrat (Hartford City) (1857–1861) (Note: Also called the Democrat. Published by William McCormack and Samuel McCormack. Shut down when Civil War began so owners could join the Union Army.)
- Blackford County Gazette (Hartford City) (1901–1905) (Note: Started by Henry Geisler and Rolland B. Hubbard on August 3, 1901, as a Republican Party supporter. Included a column in French language to attract the city's Belgian glassworkers. Eventually combined with the Daily Gazette.)
- Blackford County News (Hartford City) (1852–1859) (Note: Started by E.B. Chamness in 1852, and sold two years later to A.D. Hook. Sold to John Bromagon who sold to J.D. Chipman. Chipman folded newspaper in 1859. One source considers Blackford County News to be the first newspaper in the county, possibly considering the Hartford City Times to be an advertiser and not a newspaper.)
- Brookville American (1858–1861)
- Carthage Record (1800s–190?)
- The Colored Visitor (Logansport) (1879–18??)
- Daily Gazette (Hartford City) (1901–1903) (Note: Began by Henry Geisler and Rolland B. Hubbard on November 18, 1901 as a daily version of the Blackford County Gazette)<ref="Indiana Bibliography"/>
- Daily Journal (Hartford City) (1909–1915)
- The Daily Republican (Seymour) (ceased 1899)
- The DePauw Daily (Greencastle) (ceased 1920)
- Daily State Sentinel (Indianapolis) (1861–1884)
- The Disseminator (New Harmony) (1828–1841)
- Evansville Press (1906–1998)
- Evening News (Hartford City) (1894–1937) (Note: Began in 1894 by Edward Everett Cox. (Other sources say February 1893 or 1892 was the first publish date.) Originally an independent newspaper, it became Hartford City's voice of the Democratic Party. Eventually became managed by Herbert E. Honey and James Chapman. Cox again became part of management around 1915, and was succeeded by Chapman in 1924, as Cox moved to editor. Nelson C. Townsend was editor in the late 1920s and early 1930s. Cox family sold to Ralph Monfort and Herbert Honey in 1937, causing the Hartford City News to be merged with the Times-Gazette into the Hartford City News-Times. The News-Times is the current (2009) newspaper in Hartford City. The American Newspaper Directory for March 1900 lists the start year for the Evening News as 1894.)
- Fort Wayne World (1884–1885)
- The Freeman (Indianapolis) (1884–1927)
- Gary Tribune/Gary Daily Tribune (1914–1921)
- Hagerstown Exponent (1876–2004)
- Hartford City Arena (1891–1895) (Note: Founded by William Noonan, who was head of Blackford County's Socialist Party. The paper was billed as Populist, and was the official organ of the Farmer's Mutual Benefit Association.)
- Hartford City Courier (1873–1875) (Note: Started by Richard G. Steele and James E. Williamson. Sold two years later and moved to Fort Wayne, Indiana.)
- Hartford City Democrat (1869–1872) (Note: Started by Charles F. Jackson, and sold to John M. Ruckman in 1872. Renamed News in 1873.)<ref="Indiana Bibliography"/>
- Hartford City Press (1892–1894) (Note: Started by M. Frash and son, sold a year later to George Dale and Charles Wigmore, ceased operations a year later.)
- Hartford City Telegram (1875–1914) (Note: Democratic Party weekly started by Charles U. Timmonds. Sold to Benjamin A. Van Winkle in 1883. Sold to Thomas S. and Samuel M. Briscoe in 1885. Sold to Edward E. Cox in 1891. Eventually folded into Hartford City News.)
- Hartford City Times (founded 1852) (Note: The Hartford City Times was mostly an advertiser printed by Dr. John E. Moler. Mr. Moler used a wooden press, and he had the capacity to print 1,000 papers per day (although the entire community numbered less than 400 people).)
- Hartford City Times (1885–1905) (Note: Not related to the 1852 Hartford City Times. Began as a weekly Republican Party newspaper published by Elwood Huffman and Frank Geisler. Sold to Enoch De Soto Moffett in 1888. Sold to Archie W. Tracy in 1895. Tracy purchased and absorbed Republican in 1896. A daily version of the Hartford City Times was started in 1896 with Archie Tracy as editor. Hartford City Times was purchased by Henry Geisler and Rolland B. Hubbard in 1902. Hubbard eventually sold his interest to Geisler. Merged with Blackford County Gazette to become the Times-Gazette in 1905. A second source lists the start date as 1884.)
- Hartford City Union (1861–1871) (Note: Started by James W. Ruckman, and sold to John M. Ruckman in 1864.)
- The Hazleton Herald (founded 1896)
- The Hazleton News (c. 1888)
- The Herald (Lynn) (ceased 1920s)
- Hoosier Topics (Cloverdale) (founded 1900s)
- Indiana Palladium (Lawrenceburg) (1825–1836)
- Indiana-Posten (South Bend) (founded 1899)
- Indiana State Sentinel (Indianapolis) (1845–1851)
- Indiana Tribüne (Indianapolis, in German) (1878–1907)
- Indianapolis Daily Herald (1865–1868)
- Indianapolis Journal (1867–1904)
- Indianapolis Leader (1879–1891)
- Indianapolis Ledger (1912–19??)
- Indianapolis News (1869–1999)
- Indianapolis Sentinel (1880–1904)
- Indianapolis Times (1888–1965)
- Indianapolis World (1880s–19??)
- Irvington Review and Irvingtonian (Indianapolis) (1937–1939)
- Jamestown Tribune (1800s)
- Jasper Weekly Courier (1858–1922)
- Jedność (Gary) (1975–19??)
- Kosciusko Co. Standard (Leesburg) (founded 1880s)
- Kurjer (Gary) (founded 1937)
- La Porte Chronicle (1874–1880)
- Lake City Commercial (Warsaw) (1859–1860)
- Leesburg Journal (Leesburg) (1900s)
- Leesburg News (1939–1999)
- Lyons Herald (c. 1939)
- Marshall County Democrat (1855–1859)
- Marshall County Republican (Plymouth) (1856–1878)
- Messenger Crier (Crawfordsville) (founded 1900s)
- The Microscope and General Advertiser (New Albany) (1824–1825)
- Muncietown Telegraph (1841–1842)
- Nasze życie (East Chicago, in Polish) (1936–19??)
- The National Republican (Muncie) (1914–1925)
- New Albany Daily Ledger (1849–1871)
- New-Harmony Gazette (1825–1828)
- Newport Hoosier State (1890–1895)
- News (Hartford City) (1873–1885)
- Noble County Herald (Albion) (1860–1866)
- The Paper (Elkhart) (ceased 2000)
- Plymouth Banner (1852–1855)
- Plymouth Democrat (1869–1941)
- Plymouth Tribune (1901–1911)
- Randolph County Journal (Winchester) (1855–1862)
- Record-Herald (Butler) (1928–1977)
- Register (Hartford City) (1856) (Note: Established by E.B. Chamness. A.B. Hook was editor. A "small paper of liberal principles" that did not last long.)
- Republican (Hartford City) (1895–1896) (Note: Frank and Henry Geisler purchased the Hartford City Arena and renamed it. Daily and weekly editions. Absorbed by Hartford City Times.)
- Richmond Palladium (Richmond) (1831–1837)
- Rockport Democrat
- Rockport Journal
- Rockport Weekly Democrat (founded 1855)
- The Sandborn Herald (Sandborn) (founded 1905)
- Saturday Siftings (Hartford City) (1891 – before 1895)
- The Semi-Weekly Dispatch (Winslow) (ceased 1904)
- Shelby Democrat (ceased 1947)
- Smithville News (1908–19??)
- The Statesman, and Clark County Advertiser (Charlestown) (1800s)
- Terre Haute Advocate (ceased 1970s)
- Times-Gazette (Hartford City) (1905–1937)
- Trainman (Indianapolis) (1947–1968)
- Vincennes Gazette (1830–1844)
- Wabash Express (Terre Haute) (1841–1860s)
- Walton Enterprise (1920s–19??)
- Weekly Post (Bethlehem) (founded 1892)
- Winchester Journal (1800s–1920)

=== Iowa ===
- Burlington Evening Gazette (Burlington, 1904–1911)
- Cedar Rapids Republican (Cedar Rapids, 1898–1921)
- Cerro Gordo County Republican (Mason City) (1893–1906)
- Cresco Plain Dealer (Cresco) (1913–1945)
- Decorah Posten (Decorah, in Norwegian)
- Delaware County News (Manchester) (1896–1912)
- Der Demokrat (Davenport) (186?–1868)
- Denison Herald
- Des Moines Tribune (Des Moines, 1906–1982)
- Evening Times-Republican (Marshalltown) (1890–1923)
- Express-Republican (Mason City) (1886–1893)
- Iowa State Bystander (Des Moines) (1894–1916)
- Manchester Democrat (1875–1930)
- Manchester Democrat-Radio (1930–1988)
- Mason City Express (1870–1886)
- The Morning Democrat (Davenport) (1855–1897)
- Ottumwa Tri-Weekly Courier (Ottumwa, 1903–1916)
- Political Beacon (Lawrenceburg) (1837–1845)
- Sioux City Tribune
- Der tägliche Demokrat (Davenport) (1860s–1918)

=== Kansas ===
- The Commercial Bulletin (Lane)
- Topeka State Journal (1892–1980)
- The Kansas City Kansan, Kansas City (1921–2009)

=== Kentucky ===
- The Adair County News (1887–1987)
- Big Sandy News (Louisa) (1885–1929)
- Hartford Republican (1800s–1926)
- The Independent Press (Whitesville) (until 1870)
- The Jeffersonian
- Kentucky Irish American
- The Kentucky Post
- The Louisville Herald-Post
- The Louisville Leader
- The Louisville Times (1884–1987)
- The Whitesville Independent Press (1989–1991)

=== Louisiana ===
- Avoyelles Pelican (Marksville) (1859–1860s)
- Baton-Rouge Gazette (1819–1856)
- Baton Rouge State-Times (1904–1991)
- Bogalusa Enterprise (1914–1918)
- Gazette and Sentinel (Plaquemine) (1858–1864)
- Houma Courier (1878–1939)
- Lafayette Advertiser (1865–1900s)
- Louisiana Cotton-Boll (Lafayette) (1872–1883)
- Le Louisianais (Convent) (1865–1883)
- Lower Coast Gazette (Pointe à la Hache) (1909–1925)
- The Lumberjack (Alexandria) (1913–1913)
- The Meridional (Abbeville) (1856–1906)
- Le Meschacébé (Lucy) (1853–1942)
- Le Messager (Bringier) (1846–1860)
- Natchitoches Union (Natchitoches) (1859–1864)
- New Iberia Enterprise (1885–1902)
- L'Abeille (The New Orleans Bee)
- New Orleans States-Item (1958–1980)
- New-Orleans Commercial Bulletin (1832–1871)
- Opelousas Courier (1852–1910)
- Opelousas Journal (1868–1878)
- Opelousas Patriot (1855–1863)
- El Pelayo (New Orleans) (1851–1852)
- Pioneer of Assumption (Napoleonville) (1850s–1895)
- Planters' Banner (Franklin) (1849–1872)
- Pointe Coupee Democrat (New Roads) (1858–1862)
- La Sentinelle de Thibodaux (Thibodaux) (1861–1866)
- The Shreveport Journal (1897–1991)
- The Voice of the People (New Orleans) (1913–19??)
- Weekly Louisianian (New Orleans) (1872–1882)

=== Maine ===
- Evening Express (Portland) (1882–1991)
- Portland Sunday Telegram
- The Maine Times (Portland)
- The Journal Tribune (Biddeford)

=== Maryland ===
- Allegheny Citizen (Frostburg) (1950–1961)
- Annapolis Gazette (1855–1874)
- Annapolis News (1940–1952)
- Baltimore American (1796–1964)
- Baltimore Chronicle (1976–2003)
- Baltimore Evening Herald
- Baltimore Evening Sun
- The Baltimore Examiner
- Baltimore Morning Herald
- Baltimore News (1873–1936)
- Baltimore News-American (1864–1986)
- Baltimore News-Post (1936–1964)
- Baltimore Patriot
- Baltimore Post (1922–1936)
- Bethesda Tribune
- Brooklyn-Curtis Bay Town Crier (Baltimore)
- Brooklyn News (Baltimore)
- Citizen (Cumberland) (1961–1982)
- Cumberland Freie Presse (1891–1896)
- Cumberland News (1865–1869)
- Cumberland Times-News (1987–2009)
- The Daily Mail (Hagerstown)
- Daily News (Cumberland) (1890–1896)
- Der Deutsche correspondent (Baltimore) (1841–1918)
- Elkton Press (1823–1830s)
- The Enterprise (Federal Hill)
- Frostburg Mining Journal (1871–1911)
- The Frederick Post
- Genius of Universal Emancipation (Baltimore) (1823–1839)
- Maryland Herald & Elizabeth-Town Advertiser (Hagerstown) (1797–1801)
- Montgomery Journal
- Mountain City Times (Cumberland) (1865–1869)
- The Morning Herald (Hagerstown)
- Maryland Advocate & Farmer's & Mechanics Register (Cumberland) (1831–1835)
- The News (Frederick)
- Northwest Star (Pikesville) (1966–1988)
- Owings Mills Times (1986–2006)
- Pioneer (Dundalk) (1938)
- Rockville Times
- Silver Spring Suburban Record
- The South (Baltimore)
- The Washington Spy (Hagerstown) (1790–1797)
- Weekly Civilian (Cumberland) (1892–1897)
- Western Maryland Voice of Industrial Labor (Cumberland) (1938–1942)

=== Massachusetts ===
- Boston Chronicle
- Boston Courier (1824–1915)
- Boston Daily Advertiser (1862)
- Boston Evening-Post (1735–1775)
- Boston Evening Transcript (1830–1941)
- Boston Gazette
- The Boston Journal
- The Boston News-Letter
- Boston Phoenix
- The Boston Post (1831–1956)
- Boston Post-Boy (1734–1754; 1757–1775)
- The Boston Record (1884–1961)
- Boston Traveler (1845–1967)
- Columbian Centinel
- Editorial Humor
- Essex Gazette
- Gwiazda
- Holyoke Transcript-Telegram
- La Justice
- The Liberator (1831–1865, abolitionist, Boston)
- The Lowell Courier
- Massachusetts Gazette
- Massachusetts Spy
- Neu England Rundschau
- New England Chronicle
- Plymouth Rock and County Advertiser (Plymouth)
- Provincetown Advocate
- Publick Occurrences Both Forreign and Domestick (Boston)
- Village Voice (Assonet)
- Weekly Journal (East Freetown)

=== Michigan ===
- The Alcona County Herald, a.k.a. Lincoln Herald, Lincoln. The Lincoln Herald began publishing on January 1, 1908 by D. C. Magahay. On March 10, 1910 it was renamed the Alcona County Herald with Rola E. Prescott as publisher. It was the only county weekly in the United States to have its own cartoonist, providing readers with cartoons on county subjects in every issue. While its print edition is defunct, it has been transmuted into a digital-only format.
- The Bay City Journal, Bay City
- Birmingham Eccentric, Birmingham – circulation was just in excess of 6,000. It ceased print publication in December 2022.
- Bronson Journal, Bronson – ceased publication on November 16, 2017.
- Copper Island News, Hancock
- Copper Island Sentinel, Calumet
- Daily Chronicle, Marshall (1879–1907)
- The Dearborn Independent (1919–1927)
- Detroit Sunday Journal
- Detroiter Abend-Post, renamed the Nordamerikanische Wochen Post in 1980, Detroit and Warren (1868–2022)
- Detroit Times, Detroit (1900–1960)
- Die Familienblätter, Detroit (1866–1868)
- Flint Flashes, Flint
- The Grand Traverse Herald, Traverse City
- Herald Press, St. Joseph
- The Hillsdale Standard, Hillsdale
- Hillsdale Whig Standard, Hillsdale
- Livonia Observer, Livonia, ceased printing in December 2022, but an online edition persists. The paper had a circulation of over 14,000. The Livonia Observer was one of six Gannett papers that lost their physical editions. The Plymouth Voice stated in 2022 that "the publisher said publications will continue online and there were no new layoffs associated with the print finale. Currently [there] are only five reporters to cover the communities that number about one million people. Gannett said they will maintain print editions in Northville, Novi, Milford and South Lyon."
- Iosco County Gazette Index, Iosco County
- Iron Ore, Ishpeming (1886–1951; Weekly Agitator and Ishpeming Iron Agitator; merged with Ishpeming Reflector)
- Mason County Record, Ludington
- Metro Community Newspapers, Livonia
- Michigan Journal, Detroit (1854–1868), "the first German newspaper in Detroit, that was founded in 1854 by two brothers: August and Conrad Marxhausen."
- The Michigan Tradesman, Petoskey
- Niles Daily Star, Niles (1887–1919)
- Saginaw Daily Journal, Saginaw
- St. Joseph Herald, St. Joseph
- St. Joseph Traveler Herald, St. Joseph
- The Weekly Press, St. Joseph

=== Minnesota ===
- The Appeal (Saint Paul) (1889–1900s)
- Bemidji Daily Pioneer (1904–1971)
- Echo de l'Ouest (Minneapolis) (1883–1929)
- Der fortschritt (New Ulm) (1891–1915)
- Katolik (Winona) (1893–1895)
- Minneapolis Evening Journal
- Minneapolis Star (1947–1982)
- Minneapolis-Tidende
- Minneapolis Times
- Minneapolis Tribune
- Minnesota Posten
- New Ulm Post (New Ulm) (1864–1933)
- Northwest Commercial Bulletin (Saint Paul)
- Der Nordstern (St. Cloud, in German) (1874–1931)
- The Progress (White Earth) (1886–1889)
- Red Lake News (Red Lake) (1912–1921)
- Staats-Zeitung (Saint Paul) (1858–1877)
- St. Paul Dispatch (1868–1984)
- The Tomahawk (White Earth) (1903–1920s)
- Twin City Commercial Bulletin
- Vinland (Minneota) (1902–1908)
- Western Appeal (Saint Paul) (1885–1889)
- Wiarus (Winona) (1886–1893; 1895–1919)

=== Mississippi ===
- Capitol Reporter
- Vicksburg Citizens' Appeal

=== Missouri ===
- Daily Commercial Bulletin and Missouri Literary Register (1836–1838)
- Daily Commercial Bulletin (1838–1841)
- Die Gasconade Zeitung (Hermann) (1873–1870s)
- Evening and Morning Star
- Hermanner Volksblatt u. Gasconade Zeitung (Hermann) (1872–1873)
- Hermanner Volksblatt (Hermann) (1875–1928)
- Kansas City Journal-Post (1854–1942)
- Kansas City Times (1867–1990)
- Missouri Democrat (St. Louis) (1858)
- Osage County Volksblatt (Westphalia) (1896–1917)
- St. Louis Commercial Bulletin and Missouri Literary Register (1835–1836)
- St. Joseph Gazette (1845–1988)
- St. Louis Globe-Democrat (1852–1986)
- St. Louis Republic (1808–1919)
- St. Louis Sun (1989–1990)

=== Montana ===
- Copper Commando
- The Daily Missoulian (Missoula) (1904–1961)

=== Nebraska ===
- Alliance Herald (1895–1922)
- Bellevue Gazette (1856–1858)
- The Capital City Courier – Lincoln (1887–1893)
- Cherry County Independent – Valentine (1892–1896)
- Columbus Journal (1878–1911)
- The Commoner – Lincoln (1901–1922)
- The Conservative – Lincoln (1898–1902)
- The Courier – Lincoln (1899–1910)
- Custer County Republican – Broken Bow (1887–1893)
- Dakota City Herald (1859–1860)
- The Falls City Tribune (1904–1908)
- Hesperian Student – Lincoln (1844–1890)
- Lincoln County Tribune – North Platte (1885–1890)
- The McCook Tribune (1885–1912)
  - McCook Weekly Tribune (1883–1885)
- Nebraska Advertiser – Brownville (1856–1899)
- The Nebraska Advertiser – Nemaha (1899–1908)
- Nebraska Palladium – St. Mary, Iowa (1854–1855)
- Nebraska State Journal
- The Norfolk Weekly News-Journal – Norfolk (1900–1912)
- The Norfolk Weekly News – Norfolk (1899–1900)
- The North Platte Semi-Weekly Tribune – North Platte (1895–1922)
- The North Platte Tribune – North Platte (1890–1894)
- Omaha Daily Bee – Omaha (1872–1927; Omaha Bee-News, 1927–1937)
- Omaha Sun – Omaha (1951–1983)
- Ozvěna západu – Clarkson (1914–1917)
- The Plattsmouth Daily Herald – Plattsmouth (1883–1892)
- The Plattsmouth Herald – Plattsmouth (1892–1910)
- The Plattsmouth Journal – Plattsmouth (1821–1939)
- The Plattsmouth Weekly Herald – Plattsmouth (1865–1900)
- The Plattsmouth Weekly Journal – Plattsmouth (1890–1901)
- Přítel lidu – Wahoo (1895–1904)
- The Red Cloud Chief (1873–1923)
- Saturday Morning Courier – Lincoln (1893–1894)
- Semi-Weekly News-Herald – Plattsmouth (1894–1898)
- Sunday Morning Courier – Lincoln (1893–1893)
- Valentine Democrat – Valentine (1900–1912)
- The Valentine Democrat – Valentine (1896–1898)
- Western news-Democrat – Valentine (1898–1900)
- Wilberské listy – Wilber (1905–1914)
- The huntsman's echo – Wood River (1860–1861)

=== Nevada ===
- Tonopah Daily Bonanza, Tonopah (1906–1929)

=== New Hampshire ===
- The Granite Monthly
- Morning Star (Dover)
- New Hampshire Weekly
- Laconia Citizen

=== New Jersey ===
- The Armenian Reporter (Paramus) (founded 2006)
- Atlantic City Jewish Record (1939–1996)
- Carteret Press (1922–1965)
- Centinel of Freedom (Newark) (1796–1823)
- The Daily Journal (Elizabeth) (1960–1992)
- Daily Advance (Dover) (1965–1985)
- Dover Advance (1903–1914) (1923–1965)
- Dover Advance and the Iron Era (1914–1923)
- The Elizabeth Daily Journal (1868–1960)
- Madison Weekly Eagle (1882–1891)
- Morning Star (Newark)
- Newark Evening News (1989–1990)
- The Newark Gazette (1799–1804)
- Newark Ledger
- Paterson Evening News (1890–1987)
- Paterson Morning Call (1885–1977)
- Paterson Morning News
- Paterson Press-Guardian
- Vineland Independent (1867–1931)

=== New York ===
- Bronxville Press (Westchester County, 1925–1937)
- Brooklyn Daily
- Brooklyn Citizen (1887–1947)
- Brooklyn Eagle (1841–1955)
- Brooklyn Weekly
- The Buffalo Commercial (Buffalo, 1890–1924)
- Buffalo Courier-Express (Buffalo, 1926–1982)
- Buffalo Enquirer
- Canisteo Times, Canisteo, weekly, ceased about 1958
- Citizen Sentinel (Westchester County, 1919–1932)
- Daily Graphic (New York City, 1873–1889)
- Dziennik Dla Wszystkich (Buffalo) (1907–1957)
- Elmira Evening News (1894–1907)
- Elmira Gazette and Free Press (1885–1907)
- Elmira Star-Gazette (1907–1963)
- Elmira Telegram (1888–1920s)
- The Evening News (Newburgh, 1961–1990)
- Freie Arbeiter Stimme (New York City, in Yiddish)
- Long Island Press (Jamaica, New York) (1921–1977)
- Nassau Daily Review-Star
- The Merchant's Ledger (New York City) (until 1851)
- National Guardian/The Guardian (New York City, 1948–1992)
- New York Age (New York City)
- New York Courier and Enquirer (1834, New York City)
- New York Daily Column (New York City, late 1960s)
- New York Daily Mirror (New York City) (1924–1963)
- New York Evening Journal (New York City) 1896–1937
- New York Herald (New York City) 1835–1924
- New York Herald Tribune (New York City) (1924–1966)
- New York Journal American (New York City) (1937–1966)
- New York Ledger (New York City) 1851–1903
- New York Morning News (New York City) (1844–1846)
- New York Morning Telegraph (New York City, merged with Daily Racing Form)
- New-York Tribune (New York City) (1866–1924)
- New York National Democrat (New York City, 1850s)
- New York Star (New York City, 1868–1891)
- The New York Sun (New York City) (2002–2008)
- New York Sunday News (New York City 1866–1900s)
- The New-York Weekly Journal (New York City, est. 1733)
- New York World (New York City) (1883–1931)
- New York World Journal Tribune (New York City) (1966–1967)
- New York World-Telegram (New York City) (1931–1966)
- The North Star (Rochester, 1847–1851, abolitionist)
- Open Air PM (New York City, 1990s)
- PM (New York City) (1940–1948)
- Il Progresso Italo-Americano (1880–1988)
- Rochester Daily American
- Standard Star (Westchester County, 1923–1998)
- The Sun (New York City) (1833–1950)
- Syracuse Herald-Journal (1925–2001)
- Troy News
- Utica Saturday Globe (Utica, 1881–1924)
- Weekly Anglo-African (1861, New York City)
- Yonkers Herald (1892–1932)

=== North Dakota ===
- Bismarck Daily Tribune (1881–1916)
- Jamestown Weekly Alert (Jamestown) (1882–1925)
- Neche Chronotype (1897–1928)
- Northern Express (Drayton) (1881–1883)
- Pembina County Chronotype-Express (Neche) (1929–1932)
- Pembina Pioneer (1879–1882)
- Pioneer Express (Pembina) (1883–1928)
- Sioux County Arrow (Fort Yates) (1928–1929)
- Sioux County Pioneer (Fort Yates) (1914–1929)
- Sioux County Pioneer-Arrow (Fort Yates) (1929–1967)
- Ward County Independent (Minot) (1902–1965)
- Washburn Leader (1890–1986)
- Wilton News (1899–1986)
- Wing Press (Wing) (1951)

=== Ohio ===
- The Akron Press (1898–1938), joined in 1925 with the Akron Times to become The Akron Times-Press.
- Celina Democrat (1895–1921)
- Cincinnati Herald
- The Cincinnati Post (1881–2007)
- Cincinnati Times-Star (1880–1958)
- Cincinnati Volksfreund
- Cleveland Leader
- Cleveland News (1905–1960)
- Cleveland Press (1878–1982)
- Commercial Register (Sandusky) (1859–1869)
- The Columbus Citizen-Journal (1959–1985)
- Columbus Star
- The Daily Sentinel-Tribune (Bowling Green) (1906–1987)
- Daily Register (Sandusky) (1856–1859)
- Dayton Journal-Herald (Dayton)
- Evening and Morning Star (Kirtland)
- The Jackson County Times-Journal (Jackson) (until 2018)
- Penny Evening Telegram (Springfield) (1860s)
- The Philanthropist (Cincinnati) (1836–1843)
- Sandusky Clarion (1822–1852)
- Sandusky News (until 1941)
- Sandusky Star-Journal (until 1929)
- Springfield Republic
- Tägliches Cincinnatier Volksblatt (1836–1919)
- Toledo News-Bee
- Toledo Commercial (1892–1900)
- Toledo Times (1900–1975)
- Union Gospel News (1888–1906)

=== Oklahoma ===
- Branding Iron (Atoka) (1884–1884)
- Cheyenne Transporter (Darlington Agency) (1879–1886)
- Daily Chieftain (Vinita) (1898–1902)
- Indian Advocate (Sacred Heart) (?–1910)
- Indian Chieftain (Vinita) (1882–1902)
- The Oklahoma (City) Times (1889–1984)
- Tulsa Tribune (1919–1992)
- Vinita Daily Chieftain (Vinita) (1902–1913)

=== Oregon ===
See List of defunct newspapers in Oregon

- Brownsville Times (1889–1960)
- Bulletin (Grants Pass) (1949–1960, 1964–1970)
- Commonwealth (Harrisburg) (191?–1916)
- Daily Grants Pass Courier aka Rogue River Daily Courier (1886–1934)
- Grants Pass Bulletin (1927–1949; 1960–1964)
- Greater Oregon (Halsey) (1929–1978)
- Halsey Enterprise (1927–1929)
- Halsey Journal (1932–1938)
- Halsey Review (1938–1963)
- The Oregon Journal (Portland)
- Oregon Observer (Grants Pass) (18??–1927)
- Portland Evening Journal
- Portland News-Telegram
- Portland Reporter
- Southern Oregon Spokesman (1924–1927)
- Toveritar Astoria, Oregon (?–1930)

=== Pennsylvania ===
- Adams Centinel (sic) (Gettysburg) (1800–1805; 1813–1826)
- Adams County Independent (Littlestown) (1890s–1943)
- Adams County News (Gettysburg) (1908–1917)
- Advance (Philadelphia) (1887–190?)
- Advocate (Philadelphia) (founded 1890)
- Advocate (Pittsburgh) (1832–1844)
- Afro-American (Philadelphia) (1934–1937)
- Age (Philadelphia) (1866–1874)
- Agents' Herald (Philadelphia) (1877–1896)
- Agitator (Wellsborough) (1854–1865)
- Alexander's Express Messenger (Philadelphia) (1844–1846)
- All-day City Item (Philadelphia) (1872–1875)
- Alleghanian (Ebensburg) (1859–1865)
- Allegheny Mountain Echo and Johnstown Commercial Advertiser and Intelligencer (Johnstown) (1853–1861)
- Allentown Chronicle and News and Evening Item (1921–1923)
- Allentown Critic (1884–1889)
- Allentown Daily Leader (1893–1903)
- Allentown Evening Item (1915–1921)
- Allied Mercury: or The Independent Intelligencer (Philadelphia) (1781–1781)
- Alt Berks, der Stern im Osten (Reading) (1840–1844)
- Die Alte und Die neue Welt (Philadelphia) (1834–18??)
- America (Philadelphia) (19??–2013)
- American Advocate (Philadelphia) (1844–1845)
- American Eagle and Philadelphia County Democrat (Philadelphia) (founded 1836)
- American Guardian (Philadelphia) (1860s–1870)
- American Patriot (Bellefonte) (1814–1817)
- American Pioneer, and Fireman's Chronicle (Philadelphia) (1831–1833)
- American Reformer and Pennsylvania State Temperance Organ (Harrisburg) (1840s–18??)
- American Saturday Courier) (1851–1856)
- American Weekly Mercury (Philadelphia) (1719–1749)
- Amerikanischer Correspondent für das In-und Ausland (Philadelphia) (1825–1829)
- Amerikanischer Republikaner (Pottsville) (1855–1909)
- Amerikanskij Russkij Sokol Sojedinenija (Homestead) (1926–1936)
- Amerikansky Russky Viestnik (Scranton) (1890s–1952)
- American Standard (Harrisburg) (1847–18??)
- Anti-Masonic Star, and Republican Banner (Gettysburg) (1830–1831)
- Der Anti-Freimaurer, und Lecha Caunty Patriot (Allentown) (1829–1831)
- Anti-Masonic State Democrat (Harrisburg) (1830s)
- Anthracite Monitor (Tamaqua) (1871–1875)
- Ashland Advocate (1867–1920)
- Ashland Daily News (1910s–1966)
- Ashland Record (1872–1909)
- Arthur's Home Gazette (Philadelphia) (1850–1855)
- Atkinson's Saturday Evening Post (Philadelphia) (1833–1839)
- Austin Autograph (1887–1911)
- Austin Messenger (founded 1916)
- Austin Republican (1898–1906)
- Avoca Times (1889–1890)
- Bache's Philadelphia Aurora (1797–1800)
- Baner America (Scranton) (1868–1877)
- Banner von Berks, und Wochenblatt der Reading Post (Reading) (1878–1909)
- Barnesboro Eagle (1917–1924)
- Barnesborský Orol (Barnesboro) (1914–1920)
- Barthe's Weekly Star (Plymouth) (1891–1895)
- Beacon (Philadelphia) (1940–1961)
- Bellefonte Advertiser (1867–1869)
- Bellefonte Morning News (1880–19??)
- Bellefonte National (1868–1870)
- Bellefonte Republican (1869–1909)
- Berks and Schuylkill Journal (Reading) (1816–1910)
- Berks Caunty Adler (Reading) (1826–183?)
- Berks County Free Press (Reading) (1830–1835)
- Berks County Press (Reading) (1847–1865)
- Berks County Record (Reading) (1959–19??)
- Berks County Reporter (Reading) (1967–19??)
- Bicknell's Reporter, Counterfeit Detector, and Philadelphia Prices Current (1835–1857)
- Die Biene (Reading) (1867–1913)
- Bituminous Record (Philipsburg) (1885–1907)
- Blade (Scranton) (1888–1892)
- The Blue Stocking (Harrisburg) (1842–1844)
- Bomb-Shell (Harrisburg) (1848–18??)
- Borough Item (Harrisburg) (1852–1854)
- Bradford Reporter (Towanda) (1844–1884)
- Bratstvo (Wilkes-Barre) (1944–1990s)
- Call (Schuylkill Haven) (1903–1951)
- Cambria Dispatch (Portage) (1929–1948)
- Cambria Freeman (Ebensburg) (1867–1938)
- Cambria Gazette (Johnstown) (1841–1853)
- Cambria Herald (Ebensburg) (1871–1898)
- Cambria Tribune (Johnstown) (1853–1864)
- Campaigner (Bellefonte) (founded 1867)
- Capitolian (Harrisburg) (1842–18??)
- Carbondale Advance (18??–1889)
- Carbondale Advance and Jermyn Advocate (1889–1899)
- Carbondale Leader (1872–1944)
- Carbondale Transcript, and Lackawanna Journal (1851–1857)
- Carbondale Weekly Advance (1861–18??)
- Carrolltown News (1883–1950)
- Catholic Record (Scranton) (1887–1890)
- Der Centre Berichter (Aaronsburg) (1827–1847)
- Centre Democrat (Bellefonte) (1848–1989)
- Centre Reporter (Centre Hall) (1871–1940)
- Century (Gettysburg) (1874–1878)
- Der Christliche Botschafter (New-Berlin) (1836–1946)
- Die Christliche Zeitschrift (Gettysburg) (1838–1848)
- Chronicle, and Harrisburg Advertiser (Harrisburg) (1818–1820)
- Chronicle of the Times (Reading) (1823–1831)
- Chronicle, or, Harrisburgh Visitor (Harrisburg) (1813–1818)
- Church Advocate (Lancaster) (1846–1981)
- Citizen (Honesdale) (1908–1914)
- Citizen-Standard (1942–1966)
- Clearfield Citizen (1878–1885)
- Clearfield County Times (Curwensville) (1872–1884)
- Clearfield Democrat (1833–1839)
- Clearfield Progress (1913–1946)
- Clearfield Republican (1851–1937)
- Clearfield Times (1937–1944)
- Coaldale Observer (Coaldale) (1910–1958)
- Coalport Standard (1884–1934)
- Comet (Bellefonte) (1857–18??)
- Commercial Journal (Pittsburgh)
- Commonwealth (Pittsburgh)
- Commonwealth (Harrisburg) (founded 1897)
- Commonwealth (Tionesta) (1880–1885)
- Compiler (Gettysburg) (1857–1866)
- Coudersport Democrat (founded 1898)
- Country Dollar (Clearfield) (1849–1851)
- Country Mirror and Lackawannian (Scranton) (1845–1847)
- County Review (Curwensville) (1882–1910)
- Courier (Harrisburg) (1903–1924)
- Country Impressions (Sweet Valley) (1965–1974)
- Country Mirror and Lackawannian (Scranton) (1845–1847)
- Courier Herald (Wilkes-Barre) (1894–1953)
- Cresson Gallitzin Mainliner (1975–1999)
- Cross Fork News (1902–1906)
- Crystal Fountain and Pennsylvania Temperance Journal (Harrisburg) (1853–1856)
- Curwensville Herald (1915–1944)
- Daily American (Harrisburg) (1850–1851)
- Daily Bulletin (Hazleton) (1879–1893)
- Daily Chronicle and News (Allentown) (1883–1895)
- Daily Dawn (Harrisburg) (1870s–18??)
- Daily Democrat (Scranton) (1869–1870s)
- Daily Evening Mercury (Harrisburg) (1873–1874)
- Daily Intelligencer (Harrisburg) (1841–1847)
- Daily Legislative Union (Harrisburg) (1854–1850s)
- Daily News (Hazleton) (1870–1875)
- Daily News-Dealer (Wilkes-Barre) (1889–1894)
- Daily Public Spirit (Clearfield) (1901–1920)
- Daily Record of the Times (Wilkes-Barre) (1873–1876)
- Daily Review (Reading) (1895–1899)
- Daily Sentinel (Hazleton) (1869–1879)
- Daily Times (Scranton) (1874–1883)
- Dauphin Caunty Journal (Harrisburg) (1877–1887)
- Demokratischer Wächter, Luzerne und Columbia County Anzeiger (Wilkes-Barre) (18??–1909)
- Deutsch-Amerikanischer Volks-Freund (Wilkes-Barre) (1880–1884)
- Deutsches Wochenblatt (Abbottstaun [sic]) (1848–18??)
- Di Idishe Shṭime (Reading) (1922–1929)
- Diocesan Record (Scranton) (1890–190?)
- Dollar Weekly News (Scranton) (1800s)
- Draugas (Wilkes-Barre) (1909–1916)
- The Druid (Scranton) (1907–1914)
- DuBois Daily Express (1909–1927)
- DuBois Courier Express (1947–1964)
- DuBois Weekly Courier (1882–1917)
- East Berlin News (East Berlin) (1893–1925)
- East Berlin news and Biglerville News (East Berlin) (1925–1930)
- East Penn Free Press (Emmaus) (1984–1988)
- Echo Polskie (Kingston) (1927–19??)
- Elk Advocate (Ridgway) (186?–1868)
- Evening Chronicle (Allentown)
- Evening Express (DuBois) (1892–1909)
- Evening Gazette (Pittston) (1882–1900)
- Evening Herald (Shenandoah) (1891–1966)
- Evening Leader (Wilkes-Barre) (1884–1898)
- Evening News (Wilkes-Barre) (1909–1939)
- Evening Public Ledger (Philadelphia) (1914–1942)
- Exeter Echo (1939–1956)
- Farmers' and Mechanics' Journal (Gettysburg) (1842–18??)
- Fest-Zeitung (Scranton) (1884–18??)
- Forest Republican (Tionesta) (1869–1952)
- Free Lance (State College) (1887–1904)
- Freeland Progress (1881–1890)
- Free Patrol (Scranton) (1877–18??)
- Free Press (Emmaus) (1980–1984)
- Galeton Dispatch (1896–1903)
- Galeton Democrat (1903–1909)
- Garfield Thomas Watertunnel (University Park) (1969)
- Gazette of the United States, & Philadelphia Daily Advertiser (Philadelphia) (1796–1800)
- Genesee Times (1899–1902; 1903–1914)
- Gettysburg Compiler (Gettysburg) (1866–1961)
- Gettysburg Star (Gettysburg) (1864–1867)
- Gettysburg Truth (Gettysburg) (1887–1891)
- Gleaner (Wilkes-Barre) (1812–1818)
- Glen Summit Breeze (1893–1902)
- Górnik (Wilkes-Barre) (1920s–1940s)
- Greater Hazleton Mirror (1972–19??)
- Gwerinwr Cymreig (Scranton) (founded 1800s)
- Gwiazda (Philadelphia) (1902–1985)
- Harrisburg Telegraph (1879–1948)
- Hazleton Journal (1936–19??)
- Hazleton Patriot (1975–19??)
- Hazleton Sentinel (1866–1880)
- Hazleton Standard-Speaker (1961–1980)
- Das Hazleton Volksblatt (1872–1906)
- Herald of the Union (Scranton) (1856–1860s)
- Der Herold (Scranton) (founded 1870s)
- The Hershey Chronicle
- The Hershey News
- The Hershey Press
- Highland Patriot (Coudersport) (1854–1858)
- Honesdale Democrat (1844–1864)
- Houtzdale Citizen (1900–1934)
- Houtzdale Citizen and Coalport Standard (1934–1942)
- Houtzdale Observer (1882–1899)
- Howard Hustler (1898–1915)
- Howard Weekly Hornet (1894–1898)
- Hyde Park Item and Real Estate Journal (Scranton) (1874–18??)
- Index (Scranton) (1887–1899)
- Industrial Advocate (Scranton) (1877–1878)
- Investigator (East-Berlin) (1844–18??)
- Jednota (Scranton) (1902–1904)
- Jeffersonian (Littlestown) (1899–190?)
- Jewish Journal of the Anthracite Region (Wilkes-Barre) (1930s)
- Journal (White Haven) (1900–1981)
- Keystone Gazette (Bellefonte) (1937–1959)
- Kingston Times (founded 1880s)
- Lackawanna Herald and American Advocate (Scranton) (founded 1850s)
- Lackawanna Intelligencer (Scranton) (1882–1886)
- Lackawanna Register (Scranton) (1863–186?)
- La Libera Parola (Philadelphia) (1918–1969)
- Leader-Courier (Osceola Mills) (1890–1922)
- Leader-Dispatch (Galeton) (1903–1958)
- Lebanon Semi-Weekly News
- Der Lecha Caunty Patriot (Allentown) (1859–1872)
- Der Lecha Patriot und Northampton Demokrat (Allentown) (1839–1848)
- Lehigh Regiater (Allentown), 1846–1912
- Der Liberale Beobachter und Berks, Montgomery und Schuylkill Caunties Allgemeine Anzeiger (Reading) (1839–1864)
- Light on the Hill (Scranton) (1873–18??)
- Literary Visitor (Wilkes-Barre) (1813–1815)
- Littlestown News (1874–1878)
- Luzerne Federalist and Susquehannah Intelligencer (Wilkes-Barre) (1801–1809)
- Luzerne Union (Wilkes-Barre) (1853–1879)
- Marienville Express (1890–1952)
- McKeesport Daily News
- Millheim Journal (Millheim) (1876–1984)
- Il Minatore (Scranton) (1912–1940)
- Monitor (Clearfield) (1892–1905)
- Montgomery County Record
- Mountaineer (Curwensville) (1903–1915)
- Mountain Times (Bellefonte) (1918–1933)
- Multum in Parvo, and Plain Talker (Clearfield) (1833–1885)
- Narodna voli︠a︡ (Scranton) (founded 1910)
- National Gazette and Literary Register (Philadelphia)
- New Oxford Item (1879–1967)
- News (Cross Fork) (1897–1902)
- News Comet (East Berlin) (1930–1952)
- Oswayo Valley Mail (Shingle House) (1901–1962)
- Oswayo Valley Record (1900–1902)
- Palladium (Shinglehouse) (1882–1884)
- The Patriot (Indiana) (1914–1955)
- The Patriot (Harrisburg) (1891–1996)
- Penn State Collegian (State College) (1911–1940)
- Pennsylvania Chronicle (Philadelphia) (founded 1767)
- The Pennsylvania Journal (Philadelphia) (founded 1742)
- Pennsylvania Mirror (State College) (1968–1977)
- True American (Philadelphia)
- Pennsylvania Packet (Philadelphia)
- Pennsylvanische Staats Zeitung (Harrisburg) (1843–1887)
- The People (Scranton) (1886–1892)
- People's Journal (Coudersport) (1850–1857)
- Petroleum Centre Daily Record (1868–1873)
- Philadelphia Afro-American (1937–1965)
- Philadelphia Aurora
- Philadelphia Bulletin (1847–1982)
- Philadelphia Demokrat
- Philadelphia Evening Telegraph
- Philadelphia Journal (1977–1981)
- Philadelphia North American
- Philadelphia Press (1885–1920)
- Philadelphia Record (1877–1947)
- Pittsburgh Commercial
- Pittsburgh Dispatch
- Pittsburgh Leader
- Pittsburgh Mercury
- Pittsburgh Press (1884–1992)
- Pittsburgh Sun-Telegraph (1927–1960)
- The Pittsburg Times
- Pittsburgh Tribune-Review (print edition 1992–2016)
- Polish American Journal (Scranton) (1948–1972)
- Potter County Journal (Coudersport) (1880–1969)
- Potter Democrat (Coudersport) (1893–1919)
- Potter Enterprise (Coudersport) (1931–1950; 1950–1987)
- Potter Journal (Coudersport) (1857–1872)
- Potter Pioneer (Coudersport) (1843–1851)
- Press (Philadelphia) (1880–1885)
- Providence Echo (Scranton) (1879–1881)
- Potter enterprise and the Potter Independent (Coudersport) (1920–1931)
- Public Ledger (Philadelphia) (1836–1942)
- Quakertown Free Press
- La Ragione (Philadelphia) (1917–?)
- La Rassegna (Philadelphia) (1917–?)
- Republic (Honesdale) (1864–1868)
- Republican Compiler (Gettysburg) (1818–1857)
- Roulette Recorder (1903–1919)
- Sprig of Liberty (Gettysburg) (1804–1807)
- Tribune-Republican (Scranton) (1910–1915)
- Scranton Republican (1877–1910)
- Scranton Tribune (1891–1910)
- Scranton Wochenblatt (Scranton) (1865–1918)
- Sokol Sojedinenija = Sokol Soedynenii︠a︡ (Homestead) (1914–1926)
- Star (Scranton) (1871-18??)
- Star and Banner (Gettysburg) (1847–1864)
- Star and Republican Banner (Gettysburg) (1832–1847)
- Star-Independent (Harrisburg) (1904–1917)
- State College Times (1932–1934)
- Sunbury American (1848–1879)
- The Sunday Morning News (Scranton) (1878–1901)
- Sunday News (Wilkes-Barre) (1899–1904)
- Sunday News Dealer (Wilkes-Barre) (1833–1898)
- Der Susquehanna Beobachter, und Luzerne und Columbia Caunty Advertiser (Wilkesbarre) (1826–1830)
- Times (State College) (1898–1932)
- True Democrat (Wilkes-Barre) (1852–1854)
- True Republic (Scranton) (founded 1882)
- Turtle Creek Independent
- Ulysses Sentinel (1881–1916)
- Der Vaterlands-Wächter (Harrisburg) (18??–1876)
- Wage-earner's Journal (Philipsburg) (1885–1907)
- Wayne Citizen (Honesdale) (1868–1873)
- Weekly Press (Philadelphia) (1857–1861, 1883–1905)
- West Oak Lane Beacon (Philadelphia) (1951–1965)
- West Philadelphia Saturday Star (Philadelphia) (1860–1872)
- West Philadelphia Times (Philadelphia) (1924–1946)
- West Side Progress (Scranton) (1884–18??)
- Whig State Journal (Harrisburg) (1851–1853)
- Wilkes-Barre Times Leader (1907–1939, 1978–1982)
- Wilkes-Barre Weekly Times (1894–1904)
- Workingman (Pottsville) (1873–1876)
- Wyoming Herald (Wilkes-Barre) (1818–1835)
- Wyoming Observer (1967–1970)
- Wyoming Republican (Kingston) (1832–1835)
- Wyoming Valley Observer (1970–1979)

=== Puerto Rico ===
- El Imparcial (San Juan)
- El Mundo (San Juan)
- El Reportero (San Juan)

=== Rhode Island ===
- Providence Evening Bulletin (1863–1995)

=== South Carolina ===
- Abbeville Medium (1871–1923)
- Abbeville Press (1860–1869)
- American General Gazette
- Anderson Gazette (1843–1854)
- Charleston Mercury (1819–1868)
- Columbia Record (1897–1988)
- Deutsche Zeitung (Charleston) (1853–1917)
- Evening Medium (Abbeville) (1923–1925)
- The Evening Post
- Gazette and Advocate (Anderson) (1855–185?)
- The Greenville Piedmont
- Herald and News (Newberry) (1903–1937)
- Highland Sentinel (Calhoun) (1840–1843)
- Press and Banner (Abbeville) (1924–1925)
- The South-Carolina
- Southern Rights Advocate (Anderson) (1852–185?)

=== South Dakota ===
- Dakota Farmers' Leader (Canton) (1890–19??)

=== Tennessee ===
- Afro – American Sentinel (Jackson) (1890–1891?)
- Chattanooga Daily Rebel
- The Chattanooga Star
- Chattanooga Times (1869–1999)
- The Commercial Bulletin (Jackson) (founded 1880)
- Memphis Avalanche (1866–1885)
- Memphis Daily Appeal (1847–1886)
- Memphis Daily Commercial (1889–1891)
- Memphis Morning News (1902–1904)
- Memphis Press Scimitar (1907–1983)
- Nashville American
- Nashville Banner (1876–1998)
- The Nashville City Paper (2000–2013)
- Tennessee Staatszeitung (Nashville) (1866–1870s)
- Wochenblatt der Tennessee Staatszeitung (Nashville) (1867–1867)

=== Texas ===
- A.M. Journal Express (Dallas)
- Brazos Pilot (Bryan) (1877–1913)
- Bryan Daily Eagle and Pilot (1909–1918)
- Cedar Creek Pilot (Gun Barrel City) (ceased 2011)
- Dallas Dispatch-Journal(1906–1938)
- Dallas Herald
- Dallas Journal (1914–1942)
- Dallas Times Herald (1879–1991)
- El Democrata Fronterizo (Laredo) (1896–1920)
- El Paso Herald-Post
- Fort Worth Press
- Houston Evening Journal (−1885)
- Houston Morning Chronicle (−1885)
- Houston Post (1880–1995)
- Houston Press (1911–1964)
- Jewish Monitor (Fort Worth) (1910s–1921)
- The Lone Star (El Paso) (1881–1886)
- San Antonio Gazette (1904–1911)
- San Antonio Evening News (1918–1984)
- San Antonio Light (1881–1993)

=== Utah ===
- The Broad Ax (Salt Lake City) (1895–19??)
- Goodwin's Weekly (Salt Lake City) 1902–1929
- Intermountain Catholic (Salt Lake City) (1899–1920)
- Iron County Record (Cedar City) (1893–1982)
- Salt Lake Herald (1870–1909)
- Salt Lake Telegram (1915–1952)
- Topaz Times (1942–1945)
- Truth (Salt Lake City) (1901–1908)

=== Vermont ===
- Bennington Evening Banner (ceased 1961)
- Cronaca sovversiva (Barre) (1903–1920)
- Le Patriote Canadien (Burlington) (1839–1840)

=== Virginia ===
- Alexandria Gazette (1834–1974)
- Arlington Daily (1939–1951)
- Arlington Sun
- The Hook (Charlottesville) (2002–2013)
- News & Messenger
- Port Folio Weekly
- Richmonder Anzeiger (1854–18??)
- Richmond Chronicle (1969–1970s)
- Richmond Enquirer
- The Richmond News Leader (1888–1992)
- Richmond Planet (1883–1938)
- The Richmond State
- Richmond Whig

=== Washington ===
- Columbia Basin News
- Journal-American (operating in Bellevue, Wash. originally as the Journal-American, from 1979-1996, and later as the Eastside Journal, from 1996-2003)
- King County Journal (mainly print, operating as the South County Journal in Kent, Wash., from 1996-2003, and then later, from 2003-2007, as a combination of the Valley Daily News, which had ceased publication in 1990, and the Journal-American, with the online edition operating from 2003-2007)
- Seattle Post-Intelligencer (print edition 1863–2009, online-only since 2009)
- The Seattle Star (1899–1947)
- Seattle Union Record
- Spokane Daily Chronicle
- Valley Daily News (print only, based in Kent, Wash., 1986-1996)

=== Washington, DC ===
- The Bee (1882–1884)
- The Colored American
- Daily National Era (1854–1854)
- Daily News (1921–1972)
- National Intelligencer
- National Forum (1910–19??)
- New National Era (1870–1874)
- Voice of the Hill
- Washington Globe
- Washington Herald (1906–1939)
- Washington Star (1852–1981)
- Washington Times-Herald (1939–1954)

=== West Virginia ===
- Charleston Daily Mail
- Charleston Gazette
- Huntington Advertiser (ceased 1979)
- Richwood News Leader
- La Sentinella del West Virginia (Thomas) (1905–1913)
- Virginia Argus and Hampshire Advertiser
- West Virginia Hillbilly

=== Wisconsin ===
- Green Bay News-Chronicle (1972–2005)
- La Crosse Democrat
- Milwaukee Advertiser
- Milwaukee Herold
- Milwaukee Journal (1882–1995)
- Milwaukee Sentinel (1837–1995)
- Milwaukee Telegram
- The Paper for Central Wisconsin (Oshkosh)
- Wisconsin News

=== Wyoming ===
- Cheyenne Daily Sun-Leader (1895–1900)
