= List of newspapers in Georgia (U.S. state) =

This is a list of newspapers in the U.S. state of Georgia.

== List of newspapers ==
Title	Locale	Year est.	Frequency	Publisher/parent company	Notes
Albany Herald	Albany		Sun - Fri	Southern Community Newspapers, Inc. (SCNI)	Newspaper in Albany, Georgia, United States, and serves as the county's official legal organ.
Alma Times	Alma		Weekly		
Athens Banner-Herald	Athens		Daily	USA Today Co.	
Americus Times-Recorder	Americus		Daily		
Atkinson County Citizen	Atkinson		Weekly		
Atlanta Business Chronicle	Atlanta	1978	Weekly	American City Business Journals	
Atlanta Daily World	Atlanta		Weekly		
Atlanta Inquirer	Atlanta		Weekly		
Atlanta Journal-Constitution	Atlanta	1868	Daily		Began as Constitution in 1868; merged with Journal in 2001 to form Journal-Constitution
Atlanta Voice	Atlanta	1966	Weekly		
Augusta Chronicle	Augusta	1785	Daily	USA Today Co.	Began as Augusta Gazette in 1785
The Augusta Press	Augusta	2021	Daily		
Barnesville Herald-Gazette	Barnesville	1867	Weekly		
Berrien Press	Nashville		Weekly		
Blackshear Times	Blackshear		Weekly		
Brunswick News	Brunswick	1902	Tue - Sat	Brunswick News Publishing Co.	
Bryan County News	Fitzgerald		Weekly		
Cairo Messenger	Cairo				
Calhoun Times	Calhoun	1870	Weekly	Times-Journal Inc	
Camilla Enterprise	Camilla				
Catoosa County News	Ringgold		Weekly		
Champion Newspaper	Decatur		Weekly		
Charlton County Herald	Folkston		Weekly		
Cherokee Tribune & Ledger	Canton		Daily		
Clayton News	Jonesboro	1950	Wed	Times-Journal Inc	Published once a week newspaper in Clayton County, Georgia, United States, and serves as the county's official legal organ.
Clayton Tribune	Clayton		Weekly	Community Newspapers, Inc.	
The Claxton Enterprise	Claxton	1912	Weekly		
Clinch County News	Homerville		Weekly		
Coastal Courier	Hinesville		Weekly		
Cochran Journal	Cochran		Weekly		
Colonnade	Georgia College & State University, Milledgeville		Weekly		
Cordele Dispatch	Cordele		Tues-Fri & Sun		
Courier Herald	Dublin	1876	Weekly		
Covington News	Covington		Wed, Fri & Sun		
Creative Loafing	Atlanta		Weekly		
The Crossroads Chronicle	Swainsboro		Wed		
CrossRoadsNews	South DeKalb/East Metro Atlanta		Weekly		
The Dahlonega Nugget	Dahlonega		Weekly	Community Newspapers, Inc.	
Daily Citizen	Dalton		Daily	Community Newspaper Holdings, Inc.	
Daily Tribune News	Cartersville		Daily		
Dawson County News	Dawsonville		Weekly		
Dodge County News	Eastman		Weekly		
Donalsonville News	Donalsonville				
Douglas Enterprise	Douglas		Weekly		
Dunwoody Crier	Alpharetta		Weekly	Appen Media Group	
Early County News	Blakely				
Effingham Herald	Rincon		Weekly		
Elberton Star	Elberton		Weekly	Community Newspapers, Inc.	
Fannin Sentinel	Blue Ridge		Weekly		
Forest-Blade	Swainsboro		Weekly		
Forsyth County News			Wed/Fri/Sun		
Franklin County Citizen-Leader	Lavonia		Weekly	Community Newspapers, Inc.	
Fulton County Daily Report	Atlanta				
George-Anne	Georgia Southern University, Statesboro		Weekly		
Georgia Fire News	Georgia				
Georgia Post	Roberta		Weekly		
The Georgia Voice	Atlanta	2009	Bi-weekly	Rough Draft Atlanta	LGBTQ Newspaper
Gwinnett Daily Post	Lawrenceville		Wed, Fri & Sun	Times-Journal Inc	Newspaper in Lawrenceville, Georgia, United States, and serves as the county's official legal organ.
Hartwell Sun	Hartwell			Community Newspapers, Inc.	
Henry Herald	McDonough	1847	Wed, Sat/Sun	Times-Journal Inc	Henry County’s News Source Since 1874. Published twice weekly newspaper in McDonough, Georgia, United States, and serves as the county's official legal organ.
Herald-Leader	Fitzgerald		Weekly		
Houston Home Journal	Perry		Weekly		
Jackson Herald	Jefferson		Weekly	MainStreet Newspapers Inc.	
Jackson Progress-Argus	Jackson		Wed	Times-Journal Inc	Newspaper in Jonesboro, Georgia, United States, and serves as the county's official legal organ.
Jeff Davis Ledger	Hazlehurst		Weekly		
Jones County News	Gray	1895	Weekly		
LaGrange Daily News	LaGrange				
Lake Oconee Breeze	Milledgeville		Weekly		
Lanier County News	Lakeland		Weekly		
Lee County Ledger	Leesburg	1978	Weekly		
Ledger-Enquirer	Columbus	1828	Daily	McClatchy Company	Began as Columbus Enquirer in 1828, became daily Ledger-Enquirer in 1988
Marietta Daily Journal	Marietta				
Miller County Liberal	Colquitt				
Morgan County Citizen	Madison				
Metter Advertiser	Metter		Weekly		
Monticello News	Monticello		Weekly		
Moultrie Observer	Moultrie			Community Newspaper Holdings, Inc.	
Newnan Times-Herald	Newnan				
News-Observer	Blue Ridge		Weekly	Paxton Media Group	
News-Reporter	Washington		Weekly	Wilkes Publishing Co., Inc.	Merger of The Washington News and The Washington Reporter
Northeast Georgian	Cornelia		Weekly	Community Newspapers, Inc.	
North Georgia News	Blairsville	1909	Weekly	Kenneth West	
Ocilla Star	Ocilla				
Pelham Journal	Pelham				
Post-Searchlight	Bainbridge				
The Press-Sentinel	Jesup			Community Newspapers, Inc.	
Quitman Free Press	Quitman		Weekly		
Red and Black	University of Georgia, Athens		Weekly		
Rockdale-Newton Citizen	Conyers		Wed & Sun	Times-Journal Inc	Newspaper in Conyers, Georgia, United States, and serves as Rockdale county's official legal organ.
Rockdale News	Conyers		Sat		
Rome News-Tribune	Rome		Daily		
Savannah Morning News	Savannah	1850	Daily	USA Today Co.	
Statesboro Herald	Statesboro		Daily		
Sylvester Local News	Sylvester	1884	Weekly		
Technique	Georgia Tech, Atlanta		Weekly		
Telegraph	Macon		Daily	McClatchy Company	
Thomasville Times-Enterprise	Thomasville		Daily	Community Newspaper Holdings, Inc.	
Tifton Gazette	Tifton		Mon, Wed & Fri	Community Newspaper Holdings, Inc.	
Times-Courier	Ellijay	1875	Weekly	Paxton Media Group	
Times-Georgian	Carrollton		Daily		
The Toccoa Record	Toccoa	1873	Weekly	Community Newspapers, Inc.	
Today News Africa	Georgia	2014	Daily	TNA, LLC	African-American online and newspaper
Towns County Herald	Hiawassee	1928	Weekly		
Tribune and Georgian	St. Marys		Weekly	Community Newspapers, Inc.	
True Citizen	Waynesboro		Weekly		
Union Recorder	Milledgeville		Daily	Community Newspaper Holdings, Inc.	
Valdosta Daily Times	Valdosta		Daily	Community Newspaper Holdings, Inc.	
Waycross Journal Herald	Waycross		Daily		
Wheeler County Eagle	Alamo				
White County News	Cleveland			Community Newspapers, Inc.	
Wiregrass Farmer	Ashburn				

== 18th century ==
Newspapers published in 18th-century Augusta, Georgia

- Augusta Herald. W., July 17, 1799-Dec. 31, 1800+
- Georgia. The Augusta Chronicle And Gazette Of The State. W., Apr. 11, 1789-Dec. 27, 1800+
- The Georgia State Gazette, Or, Independent Register. W., Sept. 30, 1786-Apr. 11, 1789.
- Southern Centinel And Gazette Of The State. W., Dec. 5, 1793-Nov. 7, 1799.

Newspapers published in 18th-century Savannah, Georgia

- Columbian Museum & Savannah Advertiser. S.W., Mar. 4, 1796-Dec. 29, 1800+
- The Gazette Of The State Of Georgia. W., Jan. 30, 1783-Oct. 16, 1788.
- The Georgia Gazette. W., Apr. 7, 1763-Feb. 7, 1776.
- Georgia Gazette. W., Oct. 23, 1788-Dec. 25, 1800+
- The Royal Georgia Gazette. W., Jan. 21, 1779-June 6, 1782.
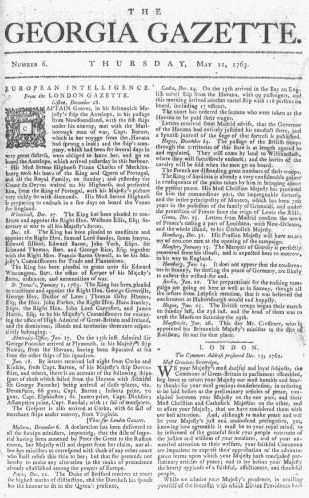
Georgia Gazette, 1763

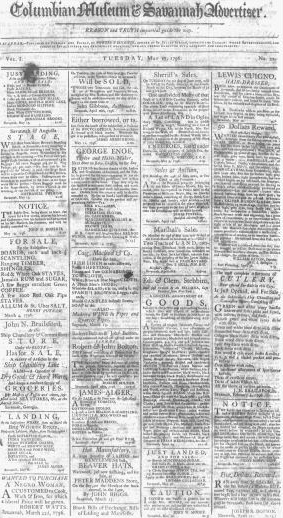
Columbian Museum & Savannah Advertiser, 1796

== Defunct ==
Title	Locale	Year est.	Ceased	Notes
Atlanta Georgian	Atlanta	1906	1939	
Atlanta Southern Confederacy				
Cherokee Phoenix	New Echota	1828	1834	
Colored American	Augusta	1865		
Columbus Messenger	Columbus	1887		
Daily Intelligencer	Atlanta			
Daily Sun				
Great Speckled Bird	Atlanta			
Luminary	Atlanta	1846	1848	Founded by Reverend Joseph S. Baker
Milledgeville Federal Union	Milledgeville			Was being published in 1835.
Savannah Georgian	Savannah			Was being published in 1834; in Newspaperarchive
The Macon News	Macon	1884	1983	Merged into The Telegraph
Union Sentinel	Blairsville	2001	2012	

== See also ==
- Georgia media
  - List of radio stations in Georgia (U.S. state)
  - List of television stations in Georgia (U.S. state)
  - Media of cities in Georgia: Athens, Atlanta, Augusta, Columbus, Macon, Savannah
- Journalism:
  - Category:Journalists from Georgia (U.S. state)
  - University of Georgia Henry W. Grady College of Journalism and Mass Communication, in Athens
- Literature of Georgia (U.S. state)
U.S. newspapers

Comprehensive

- Lists of newspapers
- List of newspapers in the United States

Frequency

- List of free daily newspapers in the United States
- List of weekly newspapers in the United States

Circulation

- List of international newspapers originating in the United States
- List of national newspapers in the United States
- List of newspapers in the United States by circulation

Foreign language

- List of French-language newspapers published in the United States
- List of German-language newspapers published in the United States
- List of Spanish-language newspapers published in the United States

Specialty

- List of African-American newspapers in the United States
- List of alternative weekly newspapers in the United States
- List of business newspapers in the United States
- List of family-owned newspapers in the United States
- List of Jewish newspapers in the United States
- List of LGBTQ periodicals in the United States
- List of student newspapers in the United States
- List of supermarket tabloids in the United States
- List of underground press in the United States

Other

- List of defunct newspapers of the United States

== Bibliography ==
- S. N. D. North; United States Department of the Interior (1884). "Catalogue of Periodical Publications: Georgia". History and Present Condition of the Newspaper and Periodical Press of the United States. Washington, D.C.: Government Printing Office. p. 214+. OCLC 1850475. (+ List of titles 50+ years old)
- James T. Haley, ed. (1895), "Newspapers: Georgia", Afro-American Encyclopaedia, Nashville: Haley & Florida, hdl:2027/inu.30000029292855, OCLC 219597043
- "Georgia". American Newspaper Directory. New York: George P. Rowell. 1900. pp. 121+. hdl:2027/umn.31951002273861a.
- "Georgia". American Newspaper Annual & Directory. Philadelphia: N. W. Ayer & Son. 1922. pp. 161+. hdl:2027/umn.31951001295695n – via HathiTrust.
- Raybun Lee Brantley (1929), Georgia Journalism of the Civil War Period, Nashville: George Peabody College for Teachers, OCLC 2590417
- Federal Writers' Project (1940), "Press and Radio", Georgia: a Guide to Its Towns and Countryside, American Guide Series, Athens: University of Georgia Press, pp. 110–116, ISBN 9781603540100 – via Google Books
- Thomas D. Clark (1948). Southern Country Editor. Bobbs-Merrill. OCLC 525858. (Includes information about weekly rural newspapers in Georgia)
- Louis Turner Griffith; John Erwin Talmadge (1951). Georgia Journalism, 1763-1950. University of Georgia Press. OCLC 1405638.
- Millard B. Grimes (1985). The Last Linotype: The Story of Georgia and Its Newspapers Since World War II. Mercer University Press. ISBN 978-0-86554-190-0.
- Cal M. Logue; et al. (1998). "Press under Pressure. How Georgia's Newspapers Responded to Civil War Constraints". American Journalism. 15.
