= Madison Haugen =

American soccer player (born 2001)

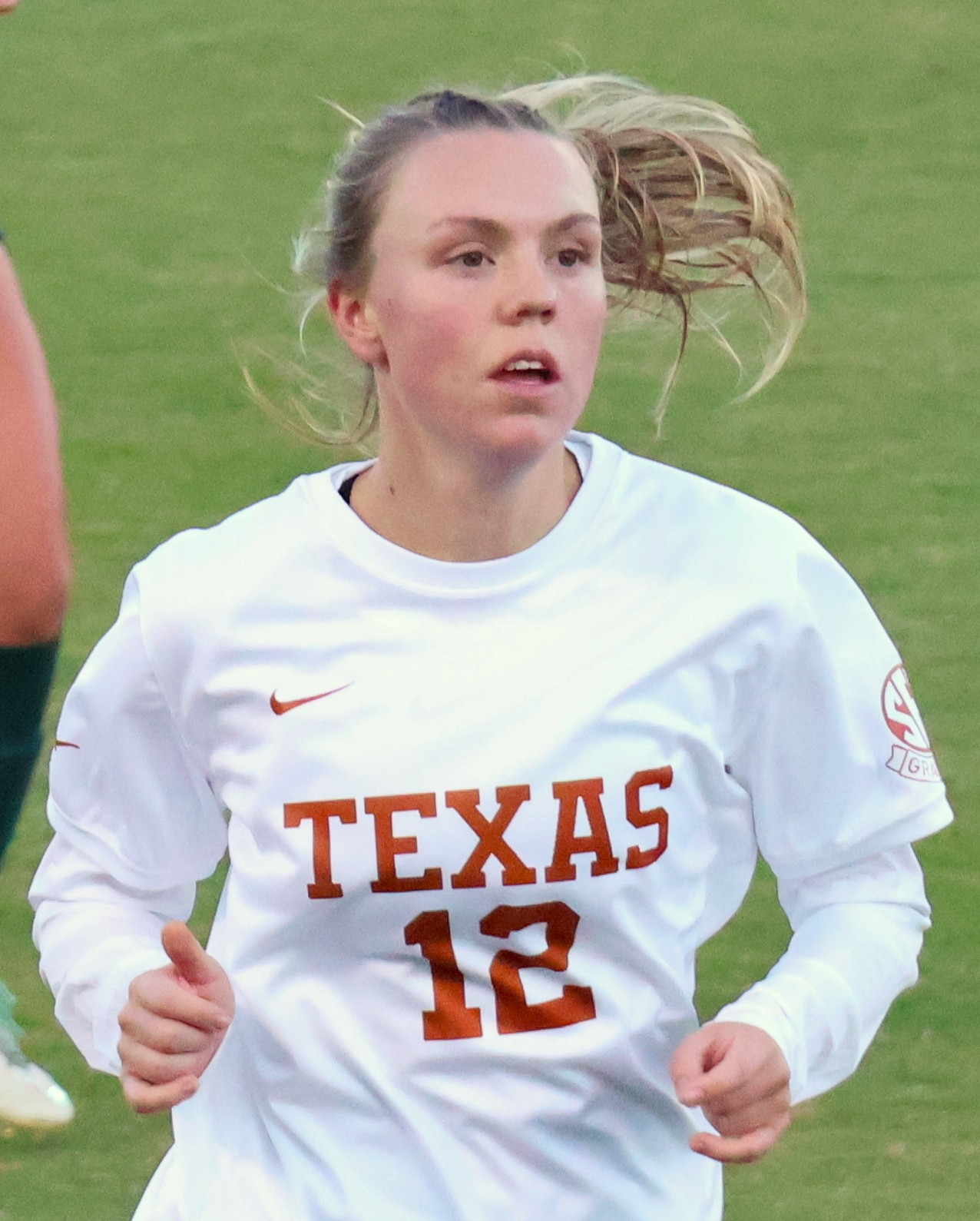
- Haugen with Texas in 2024

Personal information
- Full name: Madison Kathryn Haugen
- Date of birth: November 30, 2001 (age 24)
- Height: 5 ft 6 in (1.68 m)
- Position: Left back

Team information
- Current team: Washington Spirit
- Number: 35

Youth career
- Concorde Fire

College career
Years	Team	Apps	(Gls)
2020–2023	Georgia Bulldogs	78	(8)
2024	Texas Longhorns	26	(0)

Senior career*
Years	Team	Apps	(Gls)
2025	Sporting CP	11	(4)
2026–	Washington Spirit	6	(0)
- * Club domestic league appearances and goals as of 05:25, November 15, 2026 (UTC)

Madison Kathryn Haugen (born November 30, 2001) is an American professional soccer player who plays as a left back for the Washington Spirit of the National Women's Soccer League (NWSL). She played college soccer for the Georgia Bulldogs and the Texas Longhorns. She began her professional career with Sporting CP in 2025.

== Early life ==
Haugen grew up in Cumming, Georgia, the daughter of Michael and Jill Haugen, and has two siblings. She attended Lambert High School in Suwanee, Georgia, and became the top scorer in school history. She led the team to the GHSA Class 7 state championship as a freshman in 2017. She committed to Georgia during her sophomore year. She was named the Forsyth County News Player of the Year as a junior after leading Lambert to another state title game appearance in 2019. She was named United Soccer Coaches high school All-American in 2019 and 2020. She played ECNL club soccer for Concorde Fire.

== College career ==
Haugen played four seasons for the Georgia Bulldogs, making 78 appearances, scoring 8 goals, and providing 15 assists. After a freshman year disrupted by the COVID-19 pandemic, she started every game as a sophomore in 2021. She again started every game and led the team in assists as a junior in 2022. She assisted in the opening NCAA tournament game and scored against North Carolina in a second-round loss. She co-captained the Bulldogs to their first SEC tournament title in 2023, providing an assist in the semifinals, and reached the NCAA tournament third round.

Haugen then transferred to the Texas Longhorns in 2024, using a fifth year of eligibility extended due to the COVID-19 pandemic. She started all 23 games and provided 6 assists as a graduate student, with only Lexi Missimo playing more minutes for the squad. She contributed to the Longhorns winning the SEC tournament in their first season in the conference and making the NCAA tournament second round.

== Club career ==
=== Sporting CP ===
Portuguese club Sporting CP announced on February 5, 2025, that they had signed Haugen to her first professional contract. She made her professional debut as a second-half substitute for Miri O'Donnell in a 0–0 draw with Racing Power on March 16. On April 12, she made her first start and scored her first professional goal in a 6–0 win over Albergaria. Sporting ended the season as league runners-up.

On September 11, 2025, Haugen made her debut in continental competitions and provided a stoppage-time assist to Telma Encarnação to secure a 2–1 win over Roma in the UEFA Women's Champions League third qualifying round, but Sporting were eliminated after the return leg. On October 7, she scored her first continental goal to open a 3–0 win over Rosengård in the UEFA Women's Europa Cup second qualifying round, going on to help Sporting reach the quarterfinals. She played in 21 games and scored 5 goals before leaving the club at the end of the year.

=== Washington Spirit ===
On January 27, 2026, Haugen returned to the United States, signing a short-term injury replacement contract with the Washington Spirit. On June 30, she re-signed with the Spirit through the end of the year. She made her NWSL debut against the Utah Royals on July 30, replacing Trinity Rodman as a second-half substitute in a 1–0 victory.

== International career ==
Haugen was called into training camp with the United States under-17 team in 2018.

== Honors ==
Georgia Bulldogs

- SEC women's soccer tournament: 2023

Texas Longhorns

- SEC women's soccer tournament: 2024
