= The Flint Flashes =

Newspaper

The Flint Flashes was a weekly paper, published by the Socialist Party in Flint, Michigan during the early 20th Century, possibly beginning around 1907. G. W. Starkweather was its manager and G. N. Lawrence its editor. In 1911, its circulation exceeded 3,000 copies.

== See also ==
- List of defunct newspapers of the United States
