= Boston Weekly Advertiser =

Newspaper, 1757–1775

The Boston Weekly Advertiser
- Type: Weekly newspaper
- Publisher: Green & Russell
- Founded: 1757
- Ceased publication: 1775
- Language: English
- Headquarters: Boston, Massachusetts

The Boston Weekly Advertiser (1757–1775), also called The Boston Post-Boy & Advertiser was a weekly newspaper published in Boston, Massachusetts by John Green (1727–1787) and Joseph Russell (1734–1795).

The paper "loyally sustained the British Government" during the American Revolution.

Nathaniel Mills and John Hicks published the paper in its final years, 1773–1775.

== Varying titles ==
- The Boston Weekly Advertiser. Aug. 22, 1757- Dec. 25, 1758.
- Green & Russell's Boston Post-boy & Advertiser. Jan. 1, 1759-May 23, 1763.
- The Boston Post-Boy & Advertiser. May 30, 1763- Sept. 25, 1769.
- The Massachusetts Gazette, and the Boston Post-Boy and Advertiser. Oct. 2, 1769-Apr. 17, 1775.

== See also ==
- Boston Post-Boy, published 1734–1754
