= Tree of Liberty (newspaper) =

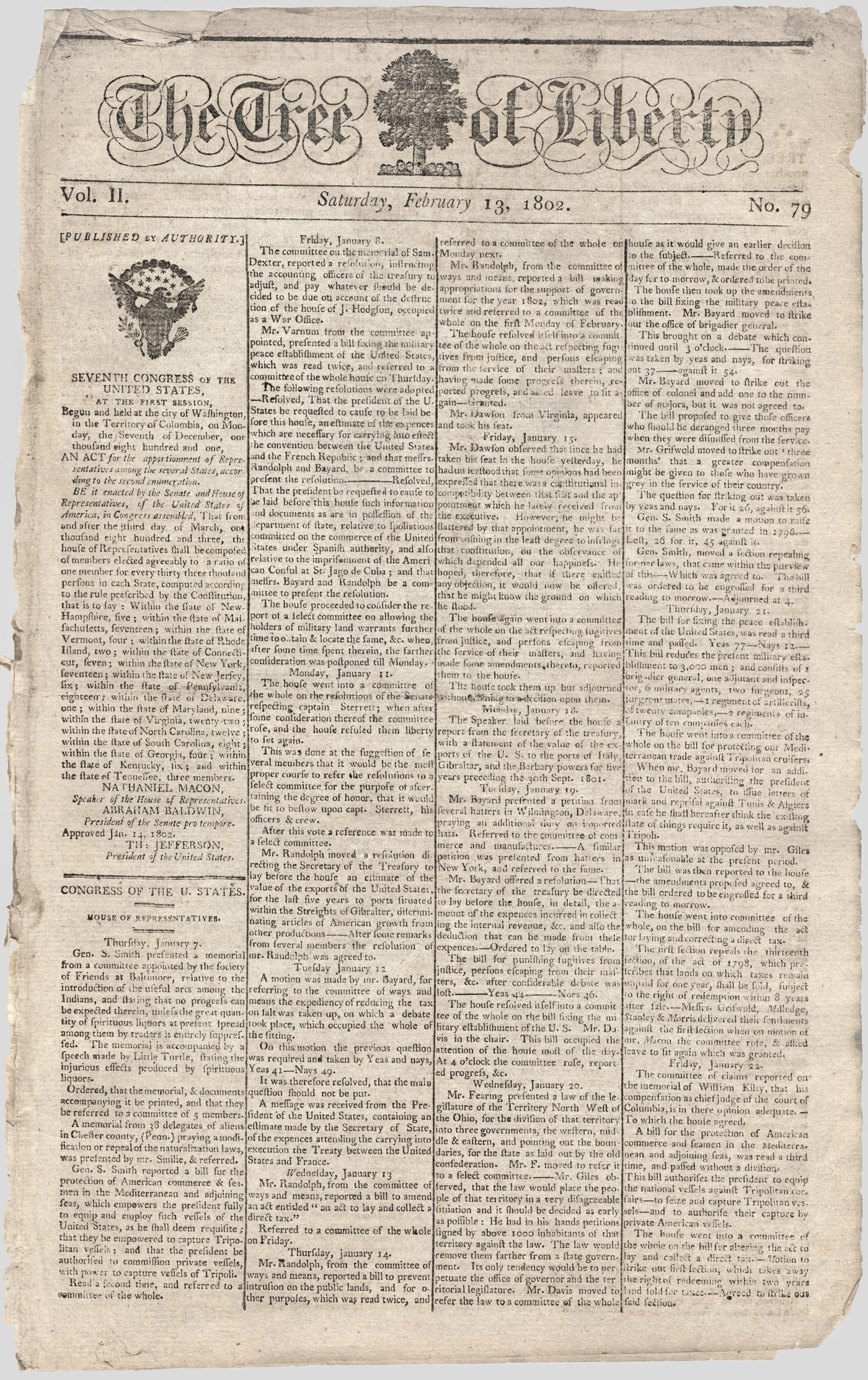
- Front page, 13 February 1802
- Type: Weekly newspaper
- Founder: John D. Israel
- Founded: 16 August 1800
- Ceased publication: circa 1810
- Political alignment: Democratic-Republican
- Language: English
- City: Pittsburgh, Pennsylvania
- Country: United States

The Tree of Liberty, published weekly from 1800 to about 1810, was the second newspaper in Pittsburgh, Pennsylvania, United States. John D. Israel established the paper and issued it from a building owned by Hugh Henry Brackenridge. Israel's columns promoted the Democratic-Republican politics of Thomas Jefferson while denouncing Federalists and their local organ, the Pittsburgh Gazette.

With the issue of 24 December 1805, Walter Forward assumed control of the paper with the participation of his friends Henry Baldwin and Tarleton Bates. In that time of disunity among Pennsylvania's Democratic-Republicans, the Tree sided with the moderate wing of the party supporting Governor Thomas McKean and clashed with the Commonwealth, a mouthpiece for the party's radical anti-McKean faction. Tensions with the Commonwealth came to a head when that paper's editor, Ephraim Pentland, wrote attacks on Bates and Baldwin. Bates retaliated by lashing Pentland with a whip, causing further confrontations that ended with Bates's death in a duel with one of Pentland's associates.

The Tree changed hands from Forward to William Foster in April 1807, after which it remained in publication for approximately three years.

== Bibliography ==
- Field, Alston G. (December 1937). "The Press in Western Pennsylvania to 1812". The Western Pennsylvania Historical Magazine. 20 (4): 231–264.
- Van Trump, James D.; Cannon, James Brian (July 1974). "An Affair of Honor: Pittsburgh's Last Duel". The Western Pennsylvania Historical Magazine. 57 (3): 307–315.
