= Hartwell Sun =

Newspaper in Hartwell, Georgia

The Hartwell Sun
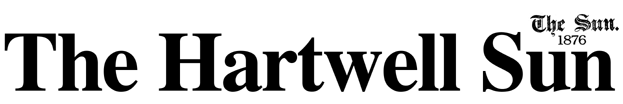
- Type: Weekly newspaper
- Owner: Community Newspapers Inc.
- Publisher: Dan Hunt
- Editor: Dan Hunt
- Founded: 1876 (The Sun); 1879 (The Hartwell Sun)
- Language: English
- Headquarters: 8 Benson St. Hartwell, GA 30643
- Circulation: 6,059 (as of 2013)
- OCLC number: 19617276
- Website: thehartwellsun.com

The Hartwell Sun is a local newspaper based in Hartwell, Georgia, that publishes articles weekly. Under the parent company of Community Newspapers Inc., The Hartwell Sun is part of a network of other papers from regions such as Florida, North Carolina, and the greater Georgia area. Community Newspapers Inc. is currently owned by President W.H. "Dink" NeSmith, Jr. and Chairman Tom Wood. The Hartwell Sun is currently published and edited by Dan Hunt. The newspaper is based out of its headquarters at 8 Benson Street in Hartwell, GA and mostly serves the Hartwell and Hart counties. The Hartwell Sun circulates 6,771 papers per day.

== History ==
The Hartwell Sun has been reporting on local news in the Hartwell and Hart counties for over 140 years. Initially titled The Sun, the first issue was printed on August 16, 1876, by the paper's first editor, John Magill. Magill, a South Carolina native, worked for the paper for 34 years. In May 1879, Magill and E.B Benson, the owner of the newspaper, renamed it the Hartwell Sun. On February 25, 1880, the paper released one of its most notable editorials, condemning the increase import duties imposed on printing paper. At the end of the century in 1896, former editor John Magill and his cousin James Magill acquired ownership of the Hartwell Sun.

The 20th century marked an era of immense change for the paper. In preparation for his retirement and with the intent of keeping the paper in the family, John Magill, along with James Magill, sold the Hartwell Sun to their cousin Leon Morris in 1909. Leon was then joined by his brother Louie Morris, who was a teenager at the time. In 1913 the new owners decided they wanted to phase out their use of handset type letter pressing. They developed a new newspaper plant on Depot street that utilized a new Linotype machine, which casts hot metal types with individual letters or symbols onto the paper in order to print text. On September 28, 1926, Leon Morris died at the age of 37, leaving Louie Morris as the sole owner of the paper.> Running the paper during the height of the Great Depression, Louie wanted the Hartwell Sun to "fill a long felt want in this community", as he declared in the 1925 National Publicity Edition. Along with running the paper, Louie founded the WKLY Radio Station in 1947 with his son-in-law Max Pfaeder, who had married Louie's daughter Edna. Louie Morris died on May 10, 1955, at the age of 62. After his death, Max Pfaeder acquired the editor's position and served for the paper for 7 years. Pfaeder was most notable for his coverage and leadership of the newspaper in the aftermath of the Brown v. Board of Education Supreme Court ruling, which desegregated public education systems. In August 1962, Neil S. "Buddy" Hayden succeeded Pfaeder as editor. Under Hayden's leadership, the Hartwell Sun began to report on the Hart County Board of Finance, a controversial decision met with pushback from the Board. Hayden would then go on to be president and publisher of the Philadelphia Bulletin as well as the president and chief operating officer for the Los Angeles Herald Examiner. In June 1968, Bill Bridges became the editor of the paper. In 1970, the Hartwell Sun fully transitioned to an offset printing system. On November 15, 1979, Morris Communications Corp. purchased the Hartwell Sun from Bridges, along with two other Georgian newspapers, The Elberton Star and The Newsleader. The ownership of the paper then transferred to Southern Publications of Jonesboro to Community Newspaper Holdings, Inc. and finally, in 1999, the paper was bought by Community Newspaper Inc. who is the current owner.

The 21st century began with several changes in leadership for the Hartwell Sun. Robert Rider, the first publisher under the new ownership, was regional publisher for the Lake Hartwell Region. This jurisdiction included the Hartwell Sun, The Toccoa Record, The Elberton Star, The Franklin County Citizen and The News Leader, all under the control of Community Newspaper, Inc. In 2000, previous editor Wassie Vickery resigned after 6 years and was replaced by Scooter MacMillan, who severed in the position for a year. MacMillian was succeeded by Judy Salter. In 2011, Salter was succeeded by Mark Hynds, who serves as the current editor of the Hartwell Sun. In 2015, Peggy Vickery became publisher and served for three years, resigning in 2018. In January 2019, Michael Hall became publisher of the paper. The current publisher and editor is Dan Hunt, who has been in the role since March 2021.

September brought a new face to The Hartwell Sun, Patrick Farguson. Patrick, a Georgia Southern graduate, moved from Tallahassee Florida with his family to northeast Georgia. He excepted the role as Editor/Publisher of The Hartwell Sun in September 2023.

== Coverage ==
The Hartwell Sun consists of news, sports, opinions and obituaries sections. The opinions section publishes opinion articles every Thursday, often addressing issues directly affecting the Hart and Hartwell county communities or the greater nation at large. Furthermore, throughout its history, the Hartwell Sun has published several notable articles. In 1880 the paper published an opinion editorial protesting the increase in import duty imposed on paper and other likewise materials. Additionally, the Hartwell Sun published a 64-page National Publicity Edition on February 27, 1925. The lengthy article was intended to address the issues directly facing the communities the paper served. One excerpt of the publication, stating that the edition “fills a long felt want in this community, a concrete means of telling the facts of its business, its commerce, its social and professional life, its schools, churches, industries and its climate, wealth, advantages of all kinds," became the unofficial motto of Louie Morris, who served as the co-owner at the time. Additionally, Louie Morris used his influence as the owner of the Hartwell Sun to contribute to the efforts of creating the Hartwell dam. He published many articles about It in the paper itself and, although the dam was unrealized at the time of his death, there is currently a dedication in his honor on the bridge crossing over the dam. Additionally, under the leadership of editor Mac Pfaeder, the Hartwell Sun published an article addressing the Brown v. Board of Education case and the resulting school and societal integration occurring. In one article from the 1950s, Pfaeder stood up for the Hartwell Sun, stating that "The Hartwell Sun is going to say what it thinks.. If you can’t see it our way, it doesn’t mean we are enemies. It simply means we don’t agree.”

== Awards ==
The papers under the ownership of Community Newspapers, Inc. have cumulatively won over one hundred state and national awards each year for several years. Individually, the Hartwell Sun has won several General Excellence awards presented by the National Newspaper Association for both Editorial and Advertisement in the last couple of decades. Bill Powell, a part-time photographer at the Hartwell Sun, won a photo recognition award in 2018 for a photo essay. Additionally, former editor Wassie Vickery was recognized with a state award for covering the Georgia Board of Education. Former editor Bill Bridges was also recognized with the national first place Freedom of Information award in 1975 for his work on the Hartwell Sun.

== See also ==
- List of Newspapers in Georgia
- List of Newspapers
- List of Newspapers in the United States
- List of Weekly Newspapers in the United States
