= The Wilmington Mercury =

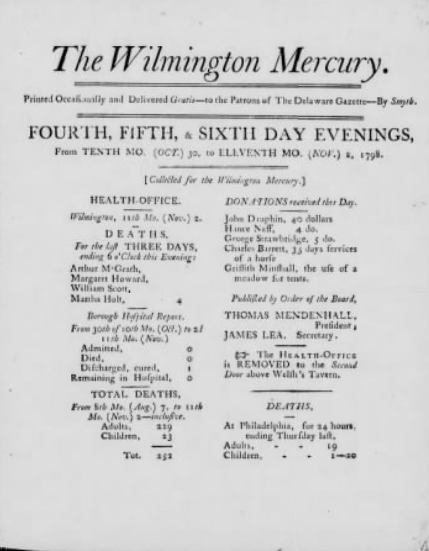
- Front page on October 30, 1798.
- Type: Daily newspaper
- Founder: W. C. Smyth
- Founded: September 1798
- Ceased publication: November 1798
- Language: English
- Headquarters: Wilmington, Delaware
- ISSN: 2639-6262

The Wilmington Mercury was a newspaper based in Wilmington, Delaware. It was the state's first major newspaper, having been founded in September 1798.

== History ==
The Mercury was founded by W. C. Smyth in September 1798 as a response to the outbreak of yellow fever going through Wilmington, Philadelphia, and New York City. It was published daily and given without charge. All issues included the names of those who had died in the last 24 hours, as well as encouraged donations to the Board of Health. Though it first had just listed deaths in Wilmington, by October 4 it listed Philadelphia and New York City too. It also listed the names of people who contributed to the Board of Health as well as gave important advice about dealing with the outbreak. When the epidemic subsided in November, The Mercury closed. Its last issue was published on October 30.
