= The Ocilla Star =

American newspaper

- Type: Weekly newspaper
- Owner(s): B&H Publications Inc.
- Editor: Luke Roberts
- City: Ocilla, Georgia
- Website: theocillastar.com

The Ocilla Star is a newspaper based out of Ocilla, Georgia. It is the legal organ for Irwin County. It is printed weekly.

The current editor is Luke Roberts. The paper is owned by B&H Publications Inc., which also owns The Wiregrass Farmer and The Adel News Tribune.
