= Boston Post-Boy =

Weekly newspaper, 1734–1754

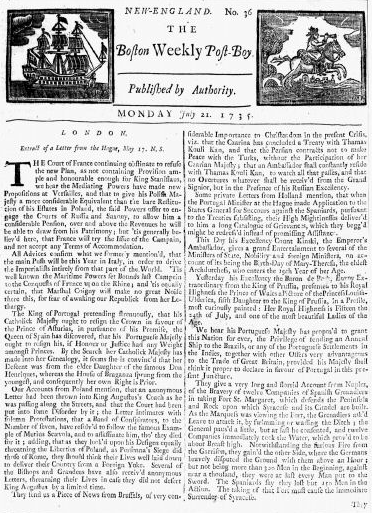
Boston Weekly Post-Boy, July 23, 1735

The Boston Weekly Post-Boy (1734–1754) and later Boston Post-Boy was a newspaper published by postmaster Ellis Huske in 18th-century Boston, Massachusetts. The paper appeared weekly, on Mondays.

Although the paper ceased in 1754, it was more or less later "revived Aug. 22, 1757, by new publishers, under the title Boston Weekly Advertiser."
