= Napa Sentinel =

Weekly newspaper from Napa, California

- Type: Weekly newspaper (from 8 January 1993; previously semi-weekly
- Publisher: Harry V. Martin
- Editor: Harry V. Martin
- Founded: 1985
- Ceased publication: c. 2011
- Language: English
- OCLC number: 28399541

The Napa Sentinel (often referred to as the Napa Valley Sentinel) was a weekly newspaper published in Napa, California. Harry V. Martin, who served 12 years on the Napa city council, was its editor and publisher for 25 years. Over the course of its publication, it was perpetually involved in legal disputes ranging from the accuracy of its reporting, the legal status of the newspaper and its corporate ownership. Martin's style of journalism was controversial, leading some to describe it as "tabloid-style journalism", "libelous", "insensitive and irresponsible" and "conspiracist".

The newspaper published articles on various topics, ranging from mind control, conspiracy theories about the Zodiac Killer, alongside various local reporting. There was repeated controversy in local news over the accuracy of some of its reporting, sometimes leading to retractions.

== History ==
The newspaper was first published on 20 September 1985. At the time, Harry Martin served as the editor, journalist and publisher of the publication. It operated out of an office in the Village Square Shopping Center and Martin stated he had hired two former Napa Valley Times advertisers and a writer for the Napa Register. At first, the newspaper was aimed only at covering the city of Napa and was to be delivered only to city residents, in contrast to the Napa Valley Times, which had debuted only shortly before the Sentinel.

The newspaper was close to shutting down following a legal dispute resulting from divorce proceedings with Martin's wife in November 1985. Martin also had heart surgery and a ruling from the NLRB that his newspaper carriers were not independent contractors forced the newspaper to choose an alternative distribution system. It was amidst these legal battles that he closed the newspaper in December, before changing his mind and reopening it by the middle of the month.

In 1995, the Napa Superior Court ruled that the Napa Sentinel could not publish legal ads because it did not have a significant paid subscribership to count as a "newspaper of general circulation". It was reported at the time that the newspaper had 611 paid subscribers.

In 2008, the newspaper's publisher Sonoma Valley Publisher closed down.

== Content ==
Over the years, the newspaper covered various topics. The original scope of the newspaper was intended to focus directly on the City of Napa, and this matched Martin's critiques of city council, police and other local government actions.

Later, the newspapers scope broadened and it published articles on a wide variety of topics like corruption, mind control, the zodiac killer, and other unsolved murders like the 1981 Cabazon tribal murders.

His reporting on government corruption achieved popularity among the political left, despite Martin's political positioning as a conservative.

== Controversy ==
In the span of its publication, Harry Martin's Napa Sentinel was subject to significant criticism and various controversies. One local organization referred to his reporting as "sensationalizing of unsubstantiated complaints under the guise of reporting", while Paula LaRosa stated that Martin "presses people's buttons and does it intentionally". Over the years, the Sentinel feuded with other local newspapers, being described as the "anti-Register" in reference to the Napa Valley Register and was often in opposition to the local Napa Valley Times.

In 1985, employees for the newspaper were locked out of the newspaper's offices following a dispute with his ex-wife as a result of their divorce proceedings. His wife Martha Cosgriff-Martin alleged that he was using funds from their joint military publications to fund his new newspaper venture, which violated their divorce agreement.

In 1987, the Sentinel published an article about police misconduct in a drug case. This prompted a response from the Napa Chief of Police, Dan Monez.
