= The Commonwealth (Pittsburgh) =

The Commonwealth The Statesman
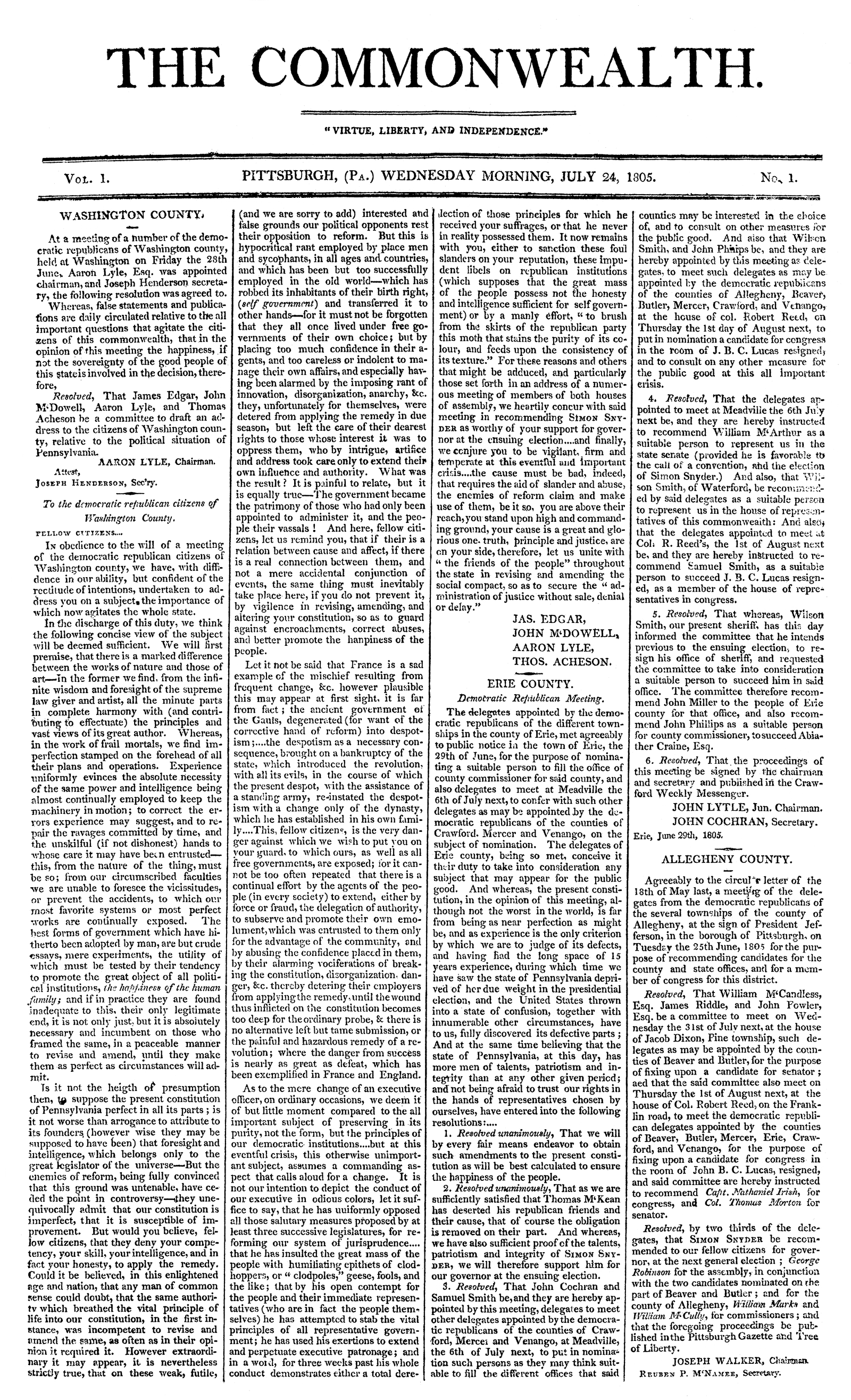
- First issue of The Commonwealth
- Type: Weekly newspaper
- Founder: Ephraim Pentland
- Founded: 24 July 1805 (as The Commonwealth)
- Ceased publication: 24 February 1836 (as The Statesman)
- Language: English
- City: Pittsburgh, Pennsylvania
- Country: United States

The Commonwealth was a weekly newspaper published in Pittsburgh, Pennsylvania from 1805 to 1818, before continuing as The Statesman until 1836. It was the city's third newspaper, and one of several in the ancestral lineage of the Pittsburgh Post-Gazette.

== Origin ==
The Commonwealth was born out of dissension in the ranks of the Democratic-Republican Party in Pennsylvania. The conflict pitted a moderate "Constitutionalist" faction (called "Quids" by opponents), supporting Governor Thomas McKean, against the "Friends of the People," who favored radical legal and judicial reform and sought to defeat the governor's re-election. Ephraim Pentland, a 20-year-old journalist who had been employed at the Aurora in Philadelphia, established the Commonwealth to give voice in Pittsburgh to the radical cause in opposition to the Quid-oriented Tree of Liberty and the Federalist-leaning Gazette. The paper first appeared on 24 July 1805 as a four-column folio sold at $3 per year. It adopted the Pennsylvania state motto — "Virtue, Liberty and Independence" — as its own.

== Stewart-Bates duel ==
Pentland's columns teemed with personal abuse, which grew especially bitter following McKean's victory over Simon Snyder in the 1805 gubernatorial election. An editorial on Christmas Day bashed Tarleton Bates and Henry Baldwin, associates of the Tree of Liberty's nominal publisher Walter Forward, as "despicable sycophants" and "two of the most abandoned political miscreants that ever disgraced the state." Bates struck back at his detractor on the street, with two or three lashes of a cowhide whip. Pentland some time later issued a challenge to a duel, which Bates declined. In publishing his account of the affair in the Tree of Liberty, Bates gave offense to Thomas Stewart, a merchant who had carried Pentland's challenge to Bates. Stewart, after failing to receive an apology, challenged Bates, who fatefully accepted. In the duel Bates was killed on the second exchange of fire.

== Pentland departure, successors ==
In 1810 Pentland left journalism to focus on his law practice and political career. The Commonwealth passed under the direction of Benjamin Brown, previously associated with the Washington, Pennsylvania Reporter. Brown, whose political views were similar to Pentland's, remained with the paper until 1814.

Following Brown's departure, a succession of others carried on the Commonwealth until 1818. Members of one publishing group, upon taking charge, complained that "They have found the establishment which has fallen into their hands sickening from the neglect of its former friends, and drooping from the desertion of its old patrons."

== The Statesman ==
In 1818, Pentland re-established control of the paper with printer Silas Engles and renamed it The Statesman. Pentland had by this time become less radical in his politics.

Pentland's father-in-law, Senator Abner Lacock, who had regularly contributed columns to the Commonwealth, used the Statesman as a political weapon and was sometimes suspected of writing for the paper under the alias "Hannibal."

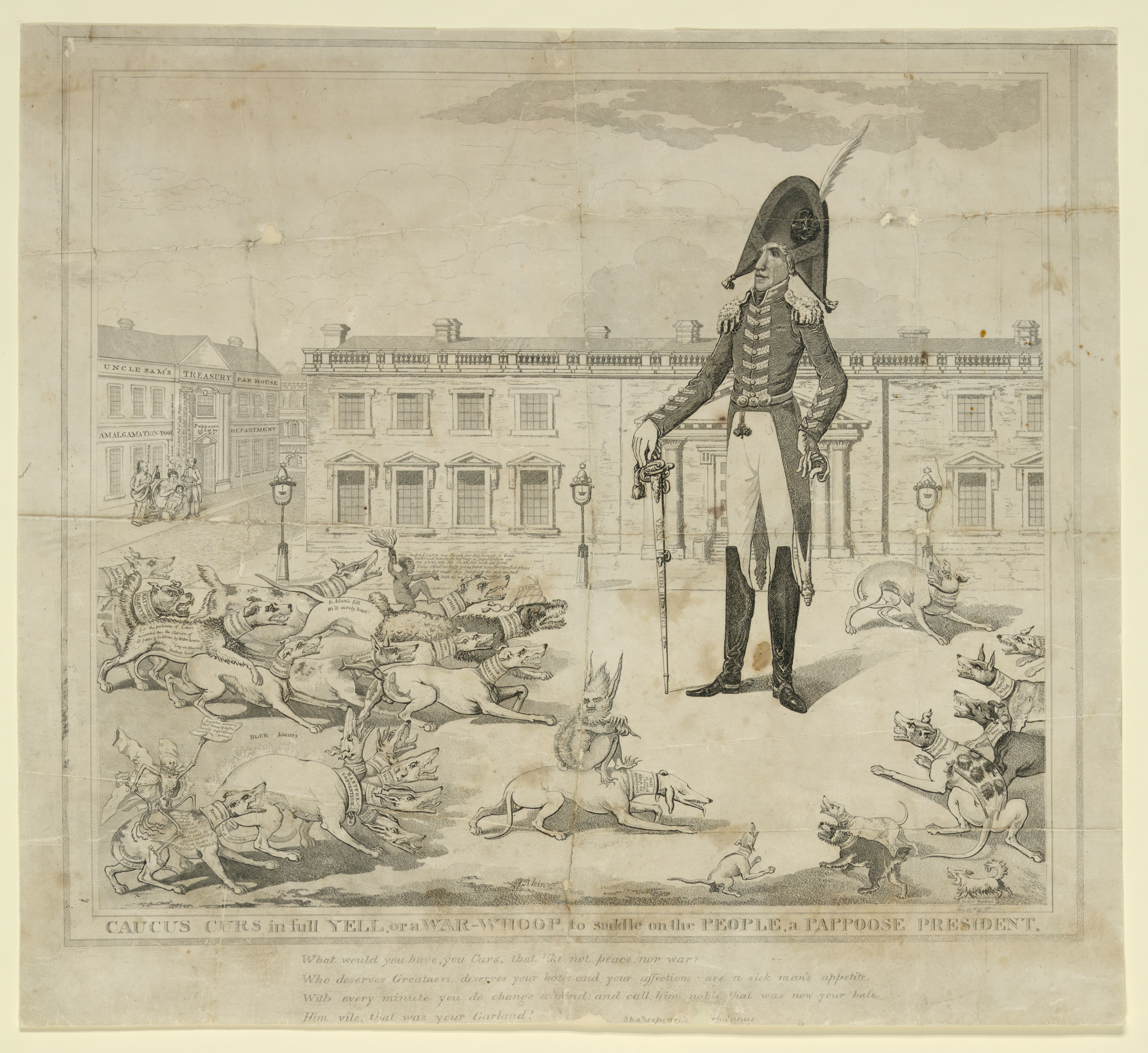
Detail of an 1824 cartoon representing the Statesman and other papers as a pack of dogs snarling at Andrew Jackson

The Statesman passed through the hands of John W. Young, and was owned in 1824 by John C. and P. C. M. Andrews. Looking toward that year's presidential election, the latter editors came out for caucus candidate William H. Crawford and against the popular Andrew Jackson. Opposition to Jackson was to be an enduring characteristic of the journal.

An 1826 directory spoke of the Statesman as "in a more flourishing condition than it has been for many years, owing to the late improvement of its appearance and the addition to the editorial department." In the same year the paper announced a semiweekly edition with the title Statesman and Pittsburgh Public Advertiser, which is not known to have lasted long.

== Butler era ==
In July 1827, John B. Butler, formerly of the Ravenna, Ohio Western Courier, bought the Statesman and assumed its management. Butler continued the paper's anti-Jackson stance, and during the presidential campaign of 1828, supposedly put out Coffin Handbills attacking Jackson.

Under Butler's direction, the Statesman became supportive of the nascent Whig Party.

An active Freemason, Butler feuded editorially with the Times and the Gazette, which in the 1830s were the local Anti-Masonic organs.

Pittsburgh newspaper consolidation timeline

== Consolidation ==
In 1836 the Statesman was sold to and consolidated with another Whig journal, the Advocate. Published daily, the Advocate also issued a weekly edition, which, as the successor of the weekly Statesman, was renamed the Weekly Advocate and Statesman. The Advocate was eventually absorbed by the Gazette, a predecessor of the Pittsburgh Post-Gazette.
