= Pasco News =

Defunct newspaper in Florida

The Pasco News
- Type: Weekly newspaper (every Thursday)
- Ceased publication: November 2006; 19 years ago
- City: Dade City, Florida
- Country: United States
- OCLC number: 33857545
- Website: thepasconews.com

The Pasco News (also known as The Dade City Banner and The Pasco County News) is the name of a now-defunct newspaper that served the Dade City, Florida area for 102 years.

== History ==
For most of its existence the paper operated under the name The Dade City Banner, a name that many longtime residents never stopped calling it. That name probably derived from the fact that when Pasco County, Florida was formed, with Dade City as its seat of government, Banner was the name intended by the residents for the new county. At the last minute, the county had to accept the name Pasco, the name of a then popular legislator in order to get approval by the state legislature.

For much of that time, it was operated by the Bazzell family. The paper changed hands in 1973 and was renamed The Pasco News. The paper, which had been a weekly published on Thursdays, briefly became a daily paper. It soon reverted to a being a weekly, once again publishing on Thursdays.

Many of the longtime residents remember enjoying reading the society column back when it was still The Dade City Banner describing in great detail events such as weddings, complete with descriptions of the dresses worn by the bride, the bride's maids, the bride's mother, and any other significant female attendees. There were articles about children's birthday parties, and families entertaining out of town relatives and other guests.

This sort of purely local coverage was a major part of the paper's charm for Dade City area residents for many years. There was no door to door delivery; subscribers received the paper in the mail. Local residents who were serving in the military could learn about what was happening back home by having the paper mailed to them.

== Later years ==
In more recent years, the paper began to move away from this type of local coverage, omitting the society column and trying to provide the kind of local news that could be found in the local sections of the major newspapers.

The paper did in some ways continue to provide the kind of local coverage it had become famous for, especially in the pages about local sports which provided coverage of local school athletic teams and even some little league games. The paper always provided local residents with a forum to write about anything that was on their minds on the letters to the editor page. There were also a few unpaid local columnists who wrote about almost anything, almost like a weekly letter to the editor. These were not necessarily on local subjects and were often local only in the sense that they were written by local residents. For the last few years of its existence, the most popular feature of the paper was a column highlighting a few bits of news from the Dade City Banner exactly 63 years earlier and 35 years earlier.

The last issue was published at the end of November, 2006. Just a few months earlier, the paper underwent a final name change, to The Pasco County News.
