= The Holbrook News =

Newspaper published in Holbrook, Arizona

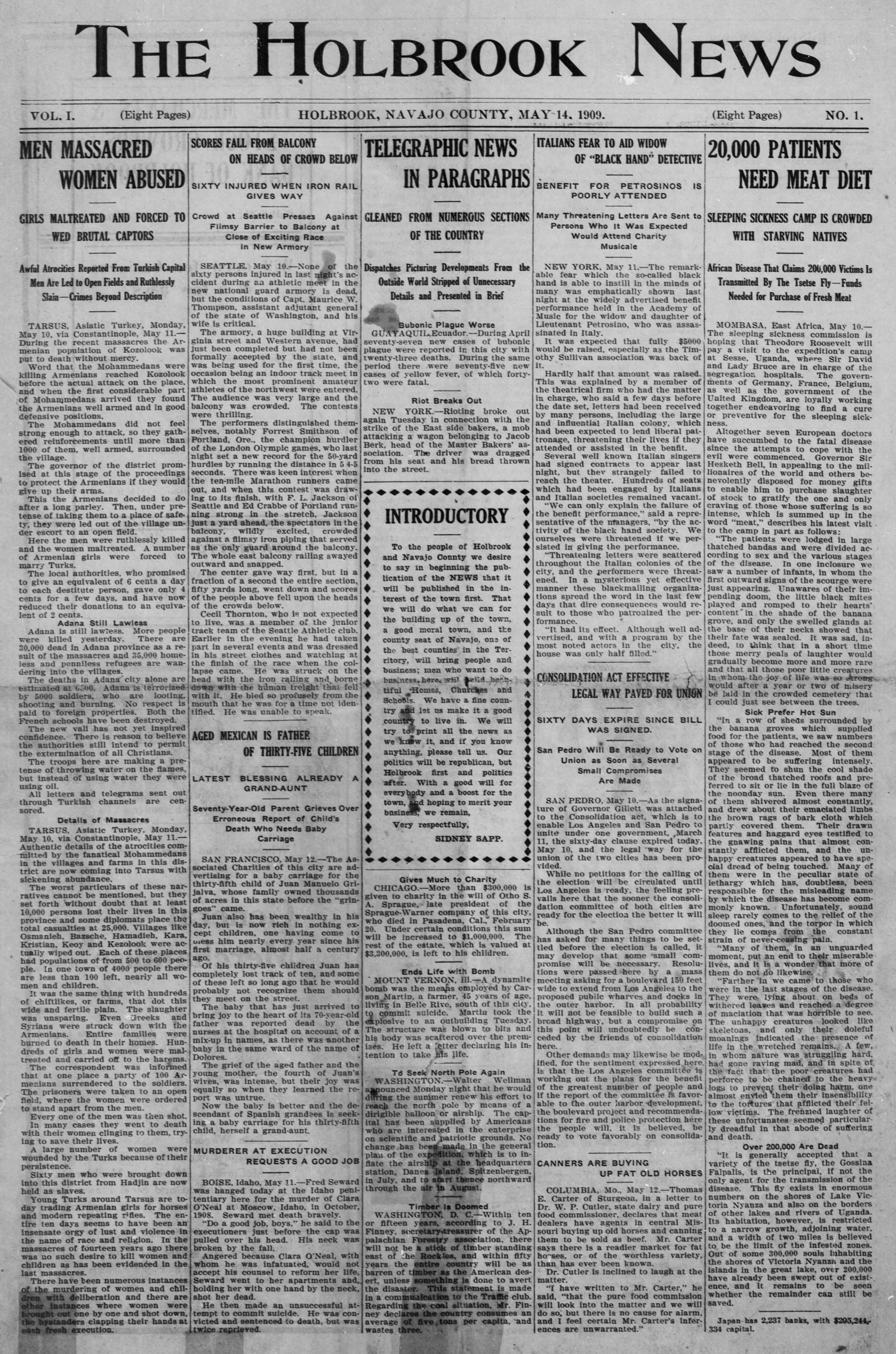
- Front page of the premiere edition
- Format: Weekly
- Founder: Sidney Sapp
- Editor: Sidney Sapp
- Founded: May 14, 1909
- Ceased publication: February 9, 1923
- Language: English
- City: Holbrook, Arizona
- Country: United States
- ISSN: 2375-1762
- OCLC number: 30632666

The Holbrook News was a newspaper established in Holbrook, Arizona, in 1909. Its founder and initial editor was Sidney Sapp. The paper ceased publication when it merged with The Holbrook Tribune in 1923, and began to be published under the title, Holbrook Tribune and Holbrook News, edited by V. P. Richards. The Tribune had begun publication in 1918. The combined paper continued in publication until January 1934.
