= The Bachelor's Beat =

Defunct newspaper in Las Vegas, Nevada

- Type: Weekly newspaper
- Format: Tabloid
- Owner: Jerry Jay Evenson
- Founded: 1964; 61 years ago
- Ceased publication: 2008; 17 years ago
- Headquarters: Las Vegas, Nevada, United States]
- Country: United States
- OCLC number: 182581450
- Website: thebachelorsbeat.com

The Bachelor's Beat (commonly referred to as The Beat) was a paid-circulation, tabloid-style weekly newspaper published in Las Vegas, Nevada, United States. Its content centered on local events, bands and clubs. It also contained editorials and commentary critical of local politicians.

== History ==
The paper started in 1964 (several years before the much larger New Times got their start). The Beat, as it is referred to, was initially distributed free in bars and restaurants. The newsrack price was 25 cents.

The newspaper's founder was Jerry Jay Evenson, author of the book Break The Rules And Win, Surviving AIDS and Other Disasters and When All Else Fails, R.T.D.D. (Read The Damn Directions)

The Bachelor's Beat ceased its publication in 2008.
