= The Border Vidette =

Newspaper published in Nogales, AZ

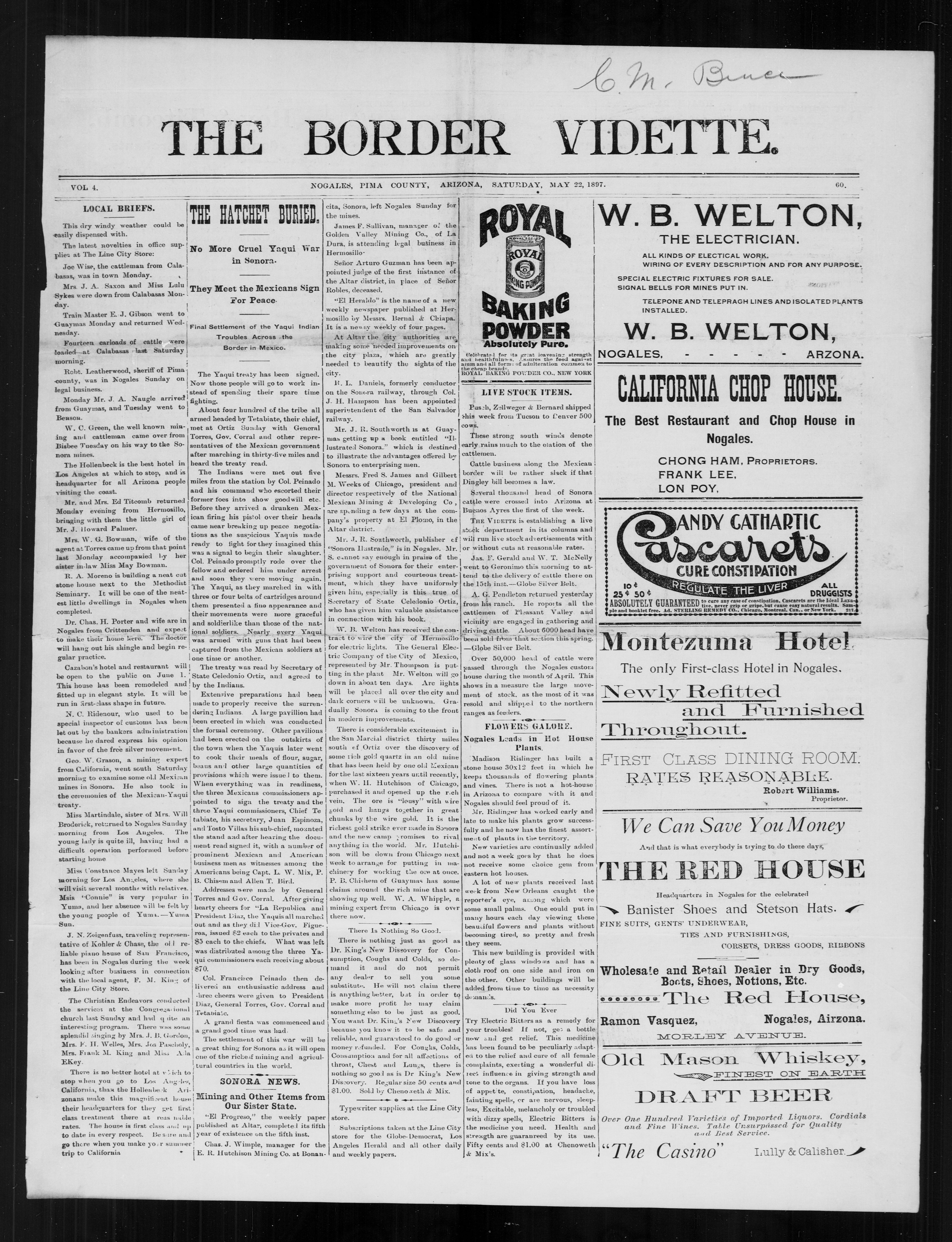
- Format: Weekly
- Owner: Vidette Publishing Co.
- Founder: Harry Woods
- Publisher: Vidette Publishing Co.
- Editor: Frank M. King
- Ceased publication: July 7, 1934
- Language: English
- City: Nogales, Arizona
- Country: United States
- ISSN: 2375-1789
- OCLC number: 34509708

The Border Vidette was a newspaper published in Nogales, Arizona with a slant towards the Democratic Party founded in 1894, by Harry Woods. The original editor was Frank M. King, who purchased the paper in 1897. King left in 1898 when Emory D. Miller purchased the paper. He would remain the editor/publisher until the paper ceased operations in 1934.
