= The Rockdale News =

Newspaper serving Conyers, Georgia

- Type: Weekly newspaper
- Format: Tabloid
- Owner: Morris Multimedia
- Publisher: T. Pat Cavanaugh
- Editor: Michelle Kim
- Founded: April 4, 2009
- Ceased publication: September 26, 2015
- Headquarters: 974 Klondike Court SW; Conyers, Georgia 30094; United States
- Circulation: 10,500
- Website: rockdalenews.com

The Rockdale News is a newspaper serving Conyers, Georgia, and surrounding Rockdale County. The newspaper publishes once per week on Saturdays.

== History ==
The newspaper was first published on April 4, 2009, under editor Tisa Smart Washington. On May 22, 2009, Michelle Kim took over as the paper's editor. The Rockdale News previously reached 10,500 homes through free and paid distribution. The paper was a tall tab format and featured color on every page. Content was completely local with no use of wire. The newspaper was owned by Morris Multimedia of Savannah, Georgia. The Rockdale News shut its doors and printed its last edition on Saturday, September 26, 2015.
