= Adair County News =

The Adair County News
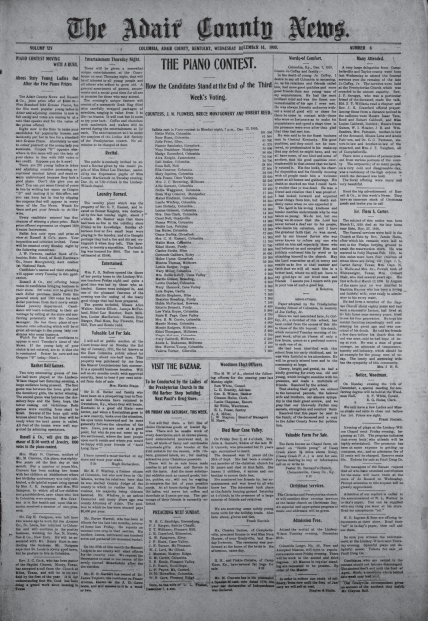
- The December 14, 1910, front page of The Adair County News
- Type: Weekly newspaper
- Format: Broadsheet
- Publisher: Adair County News Company
- Founded: 1887
- Ceased publication: 1987
- Language: English
- Headquarters: Columbia, KY

The Adair County News was a weekly newspaper published on Wednesdays, in Columbia, Adair County, Kentucky The Adair County News was first published in 1887, and was last published in 1987.

== History ==
=== Beginning ===
The Adair County News was founded by Charles S. Harris in 1887 as a Democratic alternative to Alvin A. Strange's Republican Columbia Spectator, in its first issue it was stated that the purpose of the News was that it was to serve as "a true Democratic paper, come to advocate honest convictions and defend noble principles."
