= Garfield Thomas Water Tunnel (newspaper) =

- Publisher: State College Free Press
- Language: English
- Headquarters: State College, Pennsylvania
- OCLC number: 17692761

The Garfield Thomas Water Tunnel was a counterculture underground newspaper based in University Park, Pennsylvania. It was named after a military research facility at the nearby Pennsylvania State University and also in honor of a graduate of Penn State's journalism program who was killed during World War II. The first issue was sold January 27, 1969.

== History of publication ==
The newspaper was offset printed by an Industrial Workers of the World printer in the basement of Canterbury House, an off-campus organisation not otherwise associated with the publication, and usually referred to by its unofficial name, The Shelter.

The first issue was published on January 27, 1969. About 5,000 issues were printed, with a cover price of 15¢. The front page featured a nude photograph of John Lennon and Yoko Ono that the couple had used on the cover of Unfinished Music No. 1: Two Virgins. After the initial issue, sale of the paper on campus was banned by Charles Lewis, the Vice President for Student Affairs at Penn State, on the grounds that it violated a rule prohibiting "conduct detrimental to the good name and welfare of the University". The University Student Government declared the ban "null and void" and vowed to continue to sell the paper. Future editions were sold off-campus in the town, notably by Nittany News.

On February 18, 1969, police made six arrests in connection with the paper. Four students involved in publishing the paper and a store clerk alleged to have sold it were charged with distributing obscene material to minors. Charges against two of the students were dismissed, while those against the other two–Alvan Youngberg and Russell Farb–and the clerk proceeded to trial. Donald L. Smith, a First Amendment expert, and professors Philip Klass and Robert Frank testified on behalf of the defense. The trial ended in a conviction for the clerk and a hung jury for the student publishers, who were not further prosecuted.
