= Pochodeň =

Pochodeň ('The Torch') was a Czech language left-wing weekly newspaper published from Chicago, United States, between June 1896 and May 1899.
