= Copper Commando =

- Type: Biweekly newspaper
- Format: Tabloid
- Owner: Anaconda Copper Mining Company
- Publisher: Victory Labor Management Committees
- Editor: Robert Newcomb
- Founded: 1942
- Ceased publication: 1945

The Copper Commando was the official newspaper of the Victory Labor-Management Committees of the Anaconda Copper Mining Company (ACM) and its Union representatives of Butte, Anaconda, and Great Falls, Montana. Published bi-weekly from August 1942 to August 1945, the Copper Commando was established at the recommendation of, and with an editor appointed by, the U. S. War Production Department. The intended audience was workers and their families. as a means to encourage metals production during World War II. A tabloid pictorial newspaper, it reported news and events at the mines and plants with photographs and illustrations.

The editorial offices were located in Butte at the Finlen Hotel, the Copper Commando was an early instance of joint Labor-Management industrial journalism in the United States, with labor and management working together to create periodical of common interest to members of both groups. Readers were encouraged to submit story and column suggestions.

Robert I. Nesmith, the Copper Commando chief photographer, documented the day-to-day work of ACM employees and illustrated how Montana metal workers were helping to win the war. The company and the unions worked together to produce a publication with policies that were developed with input from both labor and management.

An index listing people, places and processes featured in all issues of the Copper Commando was created by, and is freely available from, the Montana Tech Digital Commons.
