= Advocate (Pittsburgh) =

19th-century newspaper published in Pittsburgh, Pennsylvania, United States

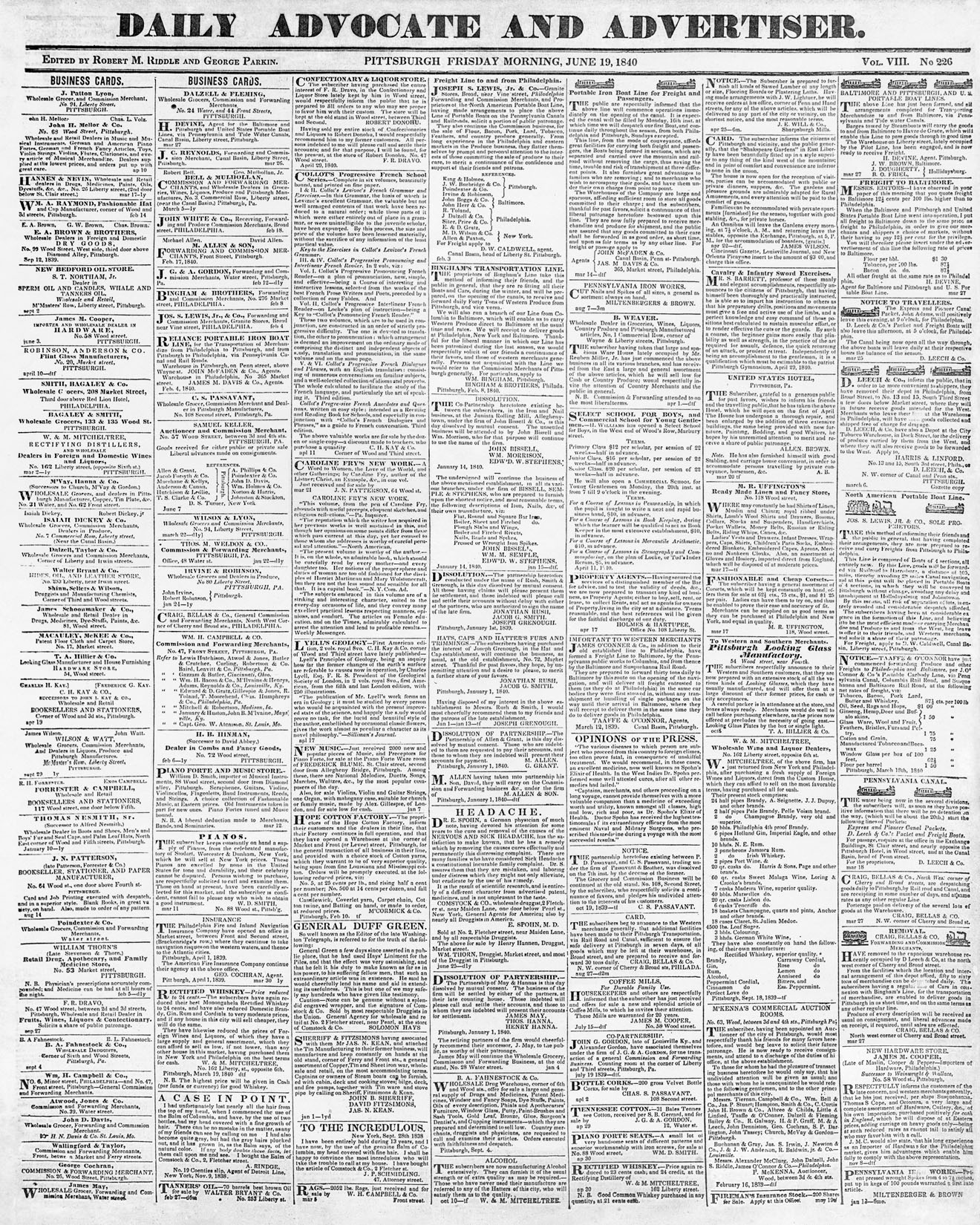
- Front page of daily edition, 19 June 1840
- Type: Daily newspaper
- Founder: James Wilson
- Founded: 13 August 1832; 1 October 1833 (daily)
- Ceased publication: 29 February 1844
- Political alignment: Anti-Jacksonian, Whig
- Language: English
- City: Pittsburgh, Pennsylvania
- Country: United States

Pittsburgh newspaper consolidation timeline

The Advocate was a newspaper published in Pittsburgh, Pennsylvania, under several title variants from 1832 to 1844. It was the second daily newspaper issued in the city, the first being its eventual purchaser, the Gazette. Politically, the paper supported the principles of the Whig Party.

== History ==
On 13 August 1832, The Pennsylvanian Advocate was started by James Wilson (paternal grandfather of U.S. President Woodrow Wilson), then of Steubenville, Ohio. Wilson announced in his prospectus that as editor, he would promote protectionism, internal improvements, a sound currency, the independence of Congress and the preservation of the Union, which, at that time, was threatened by a faction in South Carolina and elsewhere in the South. Important to all of these missions, Wilson believed, was to defeat the re-election of President Andrew Jackson.

The first few issues were printed on a weekly basis at Steubenville and sent to Pittsburgh for distribution. Very soon, Wilson had a press set up in a Pittsburgh office and began turning out a tri-weekly edition. According to William Bayard Hale, the press was the first west of the Allegheny Mountains that could print a double-page form (one side of a whole sheet) at one impression.

Born during Andrew Jackson's Bank War, the paper met controversy early on when Jacksonian newspapers accused it of accepting payments from the United States Bank to publish pro-Bank propaganda. It was reported that a letter intended for James Wilson was mistakenly received by another man of the same name, who opened it and found a $580 check from Nicholas Biddle, the Bank's president. Wilson published an affidavit denying that he had been bribed or corrupted.

With the Advocate about a year old and on its feet, Wilson left the paper to be carried on by his eldest son William Duane Wilson, at first in partnership with Alfred W. Marks. Upon this change, the paper issued its first daily edition, under the name Pennsylvania Advocate and Pittsburgh Daily Advertiser. This was the second daily newspaper published in Pittsburgh, debuting just nine weeks after the Pittsburgh Gazette went daily.

In keeping with its founding political views, the Advocate became an organ of the newly formed Whig Party. In 1836 it absorbed another Whig paper, the weekly Statesman, which had been established over thirty years earlier as the Commonwealth.

Control of the paper passed in 1837 to Robert M. Riddle, who would later be Whig mayor of Pittsburgh and editor of the Commercial Journal. In 1839 George Parkin merged his weekly Western Emporium into the Advocate and joined Riddle as co-editor. Parkin assumed sole editorship when Riddle left the following year.

The last editor-proprietor of the Advocate, Judge Thomas H. Baird, who took over from Parkin in 1843, sold the paper a year later to be merged with the Gazette. The titles of the daily editions of the two papers, Pittsburgh Daily Gazette and Daily Advocate and Advertiser, were combined as Pittsburgh Daily Gazette and Advertiser (the word "Advocate" was dropped to avoid confusion with two religious papers known by that name). In his farewell address, Baird wrote, "Thus two of the oldest papers in the Western country will be coalesced in the support of Henry Clay and the American system. This consummation has been desired for some time, by many leading Whigs of the District, and to their wishes I have yielded."

== Titles and editions ==
The full title of the Advocate varied over time and between editions. Because of gaps in the survival of the newspaper, the following list is not necessarily complete.

Years	Edition	Title
1832–1833	Triweekly	The Pennsylvania Advocate
1833–1834	Daily	Pennsylvania Advocate and Pittsburgh Daily Advertiser
1834–1836	Daily	Pittsburgh Daily Advocate and Advertiser
1836–1844	Daily	Daily Advocate and Advertiser

Years	Edition	Title
1832	Weekly	The Pennsylvanian Advocate
? (incl. 1834)	Weekly	Weekly Pennsylvania Advocate
1836–1839	Weekly	Weekly Advocate and Statesman
1839–1844	Weekly	Weekly Advocate and Emporium
