= Daily Sun (Warner Robins, Georgia) =

The Daily Sun was a daily newspaper founded in 1969 by Foy Evans to serve Warner Robins, Georgia.

Evans sold the paper to Roy H. Park in 1972. Park's papers were acquired by Media General in 1996. In 1997, Media General sold 43 papers to Community Newspaper Holdings. CNHI sold The Daily Sun to Knight Ridder, owner of The Macon Telegraph, later in the year as part of a newspaper trade. It was published in Warner Robins from 1969 until 2003, when it was merged with The Macon Telegraph. The merged newspaper became known as The Telegraph. The final edition of The Daily Sun was published February 2, 2003.

From 2002 to 2008, a weekly section of The Telegraph known as "Houston Peach" covered news in Houston County. Since 2008, a free weekly newspaper and portion of The Telegraph website known as The Sun News has been dedicated to news from Houston County.
