= Forsyth County News =

Subscription-based local newspaper presiding over Forsyth County in Georgia

- Type: Weekly Newspaper
- Format: Broadsheet
- Owner: Metro Market Media
- Publisher: Stephanie Woody
- Editor: Michelle Hall
- Founded: 1908
- Political alignment: Central
- Headquarters: Forsyth County, Georgia
- Circulation: 11,680 (as of 2013)
- Website: forsythnews.com

Forsyth County News is a subscription-based local newspaper covering news in Forsyth County in Georgia. It is published twice a week on Wednesday and Sunday, with a weekend e-edition available on Fridays and is entirely owned by Metro Market Media. Stephanie Woody is the publisher. The Forsyth County News serves a population of 227,967.

== History ==
Joe Patterson founded Forsyth County News as a weekly paper in 1908 in downtown Cumming, Georgia. Patterson grew the paper steadily, reaching 1,000 subscribers by 1910 and doubling that by 1920.

In 1927 Patterson sold the newspaper to Roy P. Otwell, who then combined the North Georgian and Forsyth County News into one newspaper, which he would edit for 27 years. In 1954, Charles Smithgall Sr. bought the newspaper and eventually sold it to News Corp in the 1970s. News Corp had been publishing Gwinnett Daily News, Forsyth County News, and Winder News. Robert Fowler sold News Corp to The New York Times for 103 million dollars in 1987. By 1994, Swartz-Morris Media acquired Forsyth County News and the Forsyth Forum newspaper, the county legal organ, and merged them into the new Forsyth County News.

During 2018, the newspaper was purchased by Metro Market Media in a family transaction. The Gainesville Times and Dawson County News also became part of Metro Market Media in the same transaction.

== Coverage ==
Forsyth County News is based out of Forsyth County, Georgia and delivers news content to that local area.

- Local News Coverage
  - Education
  - Crime & Courts
  - Local Government
  - Business
  - Community
  - Community Calendar
  - Weather
- Sports Coverage
  - East Forsyth High School
  - Forsyth Central High School
  - Lambert High School
  - North Forsyth High School
  - West Forsyth High School
  - South Forsyth High School
  - Pinecrest Academy
  - Horizon Christian Academy
  - Denmark High School
- Obituaries
- The Best of Forsyth contest is owned and managed by the Forsyth County News.
