= Question 1 =

Question 1 is the name of various ballot measures:

- 2020 Iowa Question 1, an Iowa ballot question on holding a constitutional convention
- Maine Question 1 (disambiguation):
  - 2009 Maine Question 1, a 2009 people's veto referendum to repeal a same-sex marriage law
  - 2011 Maine Question 1. a 2011 people's veto referendum to repeal a law ending Election Day voter registration
  - 2012 Maine Question 1, a 2012 citizen-initiated referendum to legalize same-sex marriage
  - 2014 Maine Question 1, a 2014 citizen-initiated referendum to ban certain bear hunting methods
  - 2015 Maine Question 1, a 2015 citizen-initiated referendum to revise the Maine Clean Elections Act
  - 2016 Maine Question 1, a 2016 citizen-initiated referendum to legalize the recreational use of marijuana.
  - 2017 Maine Question 1, a 2017 citizen-initiated referendum to legalize the construction of a casino in York County
  - June 2018 Maine Question 1, a 2018 people's veto referendum to repeal a law delaying ranked-choice voting.
  - November 2018 Maine Question 1, a 2018 citizen-initiated referendum to pass a law creating a home health care program for the elderly and disabled
- Massachusetts Question 1 (disambiguation)
  - Abolishing the state income tax, 2002 ballot
  - Sale of wine by food stores, 2006 ballot
  - 2008 Massachusetts Question 1, the Massachusetts State Income Tax Repeal Initiative
  - 2010 Massachusetts Question 1, the Massachusetts No Sales Tax for Alcohol Initiative
  - 2012 Massachusetts Question 1, the Massachusetts Right to Repair Initiative (2012)
  - 2014 Massachusetts Question 1, the Massachusetts Automatic Gas Tax Increase Repeal Initieative
  - 2016 Massachusetts Question 1, the Massachusetts Expand Slot Machine Gaming Initiative
  - Nurse-Patient Assignment Limits, 2018 ballot
  - 2020 Massachusetts Question 1, the Massachusetts Right to Repair Initiative (2020)
- 2020 New Jersey Public Question 1, a New Jersey ballot question to legalize marijuana
- 2020 Rhode Island Question 1, a Rhode Island ballot question to shorten the name of the state
- Virginia Question 1 (disambiguation):
  - 2006 Virginia Question 1, a ballot question to prohibit same-sex marriage
  - 2020 Virginia Question 1, a ballot question to change the congressional redistricting process
