= Maine Question 1 =

Maine Question 1 may refer to:

- 2009 Maine Question 1, a 2009 people's veto referendum to repeal a same-sex marriage law
- 2011 Maine Question 1. a 2011 people's veto referendum to repeal a law ending Election Day voter registration
- 2012 Maine Question 1, a 2012 citizen initiated referendum to legalize same-sex marriage
- 2014 Maine Question 1, a 2014 citizen initiated referendum to ban certain bear hunting methods
- 2015 Maine Question 1, a 2015 citizen initiated referendum to revise the Maine Clean Elections Act
- 2016 Maine Question 1, a 2016 citizen initiated referendum to legalize the recreational use of marijuana.
- 2017 Maine Question 1, a 2017 citizen initiated referendum to legalize the construction of a casino in York County
- June 2018 Maine Question 1, a 2018 people's veto referendum to repeal a law delaying ranked-choice voting.
- November 2018 Maine Question 1, a 2018 citizen initiated referendum to pass a law creating a home health care program for the elderly and disabled, funded by a tax
- 2024 Maine Question 1, a 2024 citizen initiated referendum to pass a law to impose a $5,000 limit on individual contributions to Super PACs
- 2025 Maine Question 1, a 2025 citizen initiated referendum to pass a law requiring photo identification for voters and make other changes to election laws.
