= Ewa =

Ewa or EWA may refer to:

== Places ==
Ethiopia

- Ewa (woreda)

Nauru

- Ewa District, Nauru

United States

- Eastern Washington, the portion of the state of Washington east of the Cascade Range
- ʻEwa Beach, Hawaii, a census-designated place
- Ewa District, Hawaii, an ancient Hawaiian district of Oahu
- ʻEwa Gentry, Hawaii, a census-designated place
- ʻEwa Villages, Hawaii, a census-designated place

== Other uses ==
- Earned wage access
- Eldercare Workforce Alliance
- Electronic-warfare aircraft
- Ewa (given name)
- Ewa, a sailing vessel later renamed Norda
- Ewá, Yoruba deity of death and decomposition
- Ewa Air, a French airline in Mayotte
- Ewa reactor, Poland's first research nuclear reactor
- Marine Corps Air Station Ewa, a former air station in Hawaii
