= Zawisza =

Zawisza, Záviš
- Pronunciation: [zaˈvʲiʂa]
- Gender: male

Origin
- Origin: Slavic
- Meaning: zawiść or záviš ("envy, jealousy")

Zawisza, Záviš, Zaviša or Zavisha is a Slavic name and may refer to:

== People ==
=== Zawisza ===
- Zawisza Czarny (1379–1428), known as Zawisza the Black, a Polish medieval knight and diplomat
- Zawisza Czerwony (died 1433), known as Zawisza the Red, a contemporary of Zawisza Czarny
- Zawisza (Szare Szeregi), the youngest Scouts, known for their resistance work during the Warsaw Uprising

Surname

- Artur Zawisza (born 1969), a Polish politician
- Marcelina Zawisza (born 1989), a Polish politician
- Oskar Zawisza (1878–1933), a Polish Catholic priest, composer and educational activist

=== Záviš ===
- Záviš of Zápy (1350–1411), a Czech theologian and composer
- Záviš, a name of Czech singer Milan Smrčka (born 1956)
- Záviš Kalandra (1902–1950), a Czech historian who was executed by Communists
- Záviš of Falkenstein (1250–1290), a Czech nobleman

=== Zaviša ===
- Zaviša Milosavljević (born 1961), Serbian football manager

=== Zavisha ===
- Brad Zavisha (born 1972), Canadian ice hockey player

== Other ==
- Zawisza Bydgoszcz, a sports club from Bydgoszcz, Poland
- Zawisza Pajęczno, a soccer club in Pajęczno, Poland
- Zawisza Rzgów, a sports club from Rzgów, Poland
- Zawisza Czarny (ship), the name of two sailing ships owned by the Polish Scouting and Guiding Association
