= Thomas Haskell =

Thomas Haskell may refer to:

- Thomas Haskell (historian) (1939–2017), American historian
- Thomas Haskell (journalist) (1833–1928), American journalist
- Thomas H. Haskell (1842–1900), Justice of the Maine Supreme Judicial Court
