= John Adams (journalist) =

American politician (1819–1897)

Colonel John Milton Adams (September 19, 1819 – October 29, 1897) was an American lawyer, politician, and journalist from Maine. He was the editor of the Eastern Argus newspaper, a daily published in Portland, Maine.

== Early life and education ==
Adams was born in the mountain town of Rumford, Maine in 1819. His father died when Adams was still young. He received instruction from a relative who had attended Bowdoin College, which inspired him to pursue higher education. He attended schools in Turner, Maine, Bethel, Maine, and Bridgton Academy. He taught in Bethel for a year prior to leaving education to join a volunteer force organized to fight the Aroostook War with Britain over Maine's northeastern boundary with the British Empire. Adams and his fellow enlistees never saw action and did not travel north of the state capital of Augusta. His Bowdoin College-educated relative was hired as a teacher in Maryland and invited Adams to join him in teaching there, which he did. He worked for two years in Maryland before returning to Maine following the death of his brother. Desiring to speak the French language fluently, he traveled northward and studied at St. Hyacinthe College in Quebec. While there, he boarded with the well-known Papineau family.

Adams died in Deering, Maine on October 29, 1897, at the age of 78. He is buried at Evergreen Cemetery.

== Politics ==
A Democrat, he also served in the Maine House of Representatives for two single-year terms in 1877 and 1878. In his second term, he was a candidate for House Speaker and received all of the votes of his fellow Democrats. However, the Republican Party dominated government in the state during this period and he lost to Henry Lord of Bangor.

== Journalism ==
In 1885, Adams was elected President of the Maine Press Association.
