= Press Herald Building =

Coordinates: 43.658895°N 70.256300°W

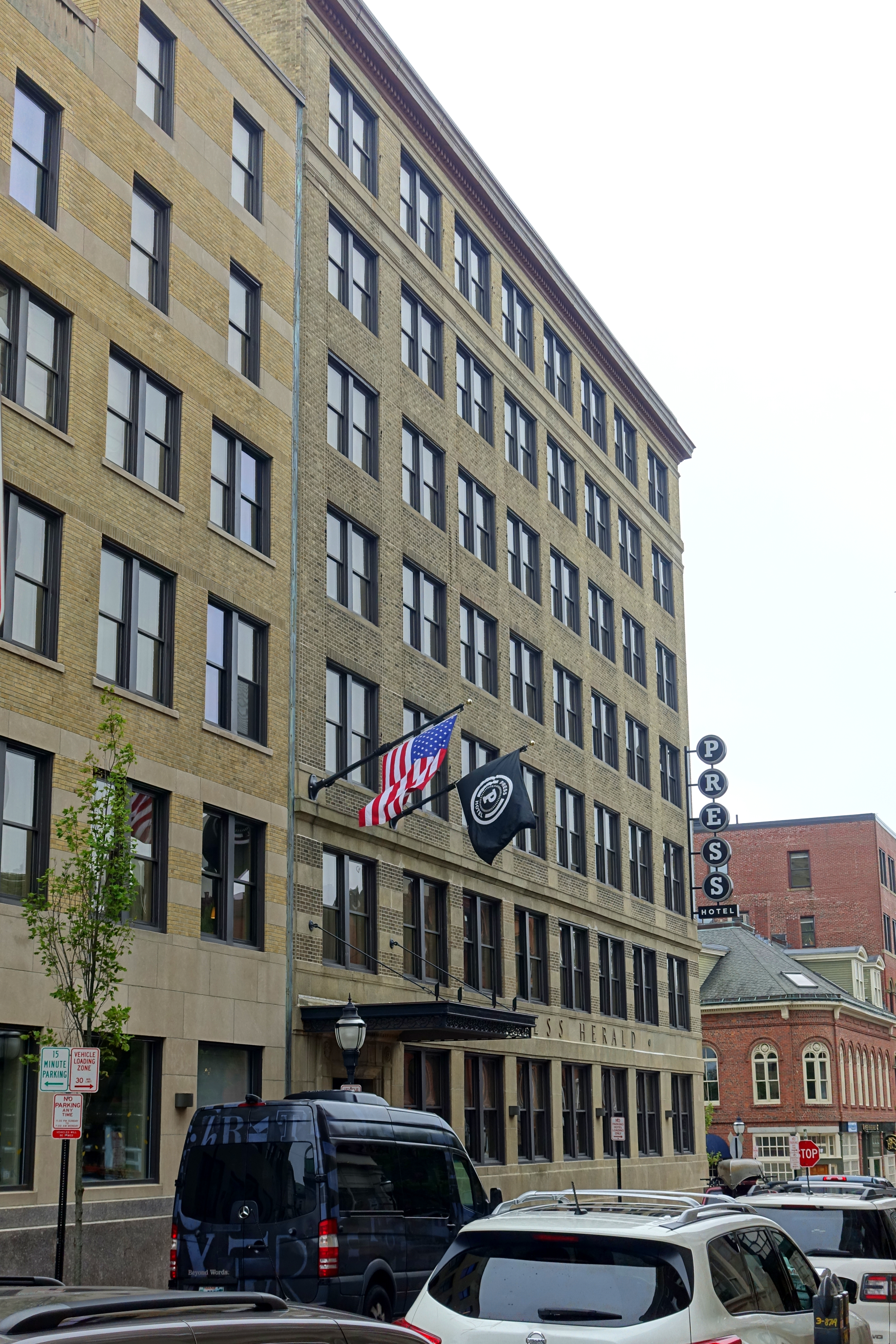
- Press Herald Building, built 1923, expanded 1948, now the Press Hotel circa 2018.
- Interactive map of Press Herald Building
- Alternative names: Gannett Building

General information
- Location: 119 Exchange Street, Portland, Maine
- Completed: 1923
- Owner: KHP

Technical details
- Floor count: 7

The Press Herald Building (also known as the Gannett Building) is a historic building in Portland, Maine, built in 1923 and expanded in 1948. It is strategically located across Congress Street from Portland City Hall. It was occupied by the Portland Press Herald newspaper until 2010. In 2015, the renovated building reopened as the Press Hotel.

== Portland Press Herald headquarters ==
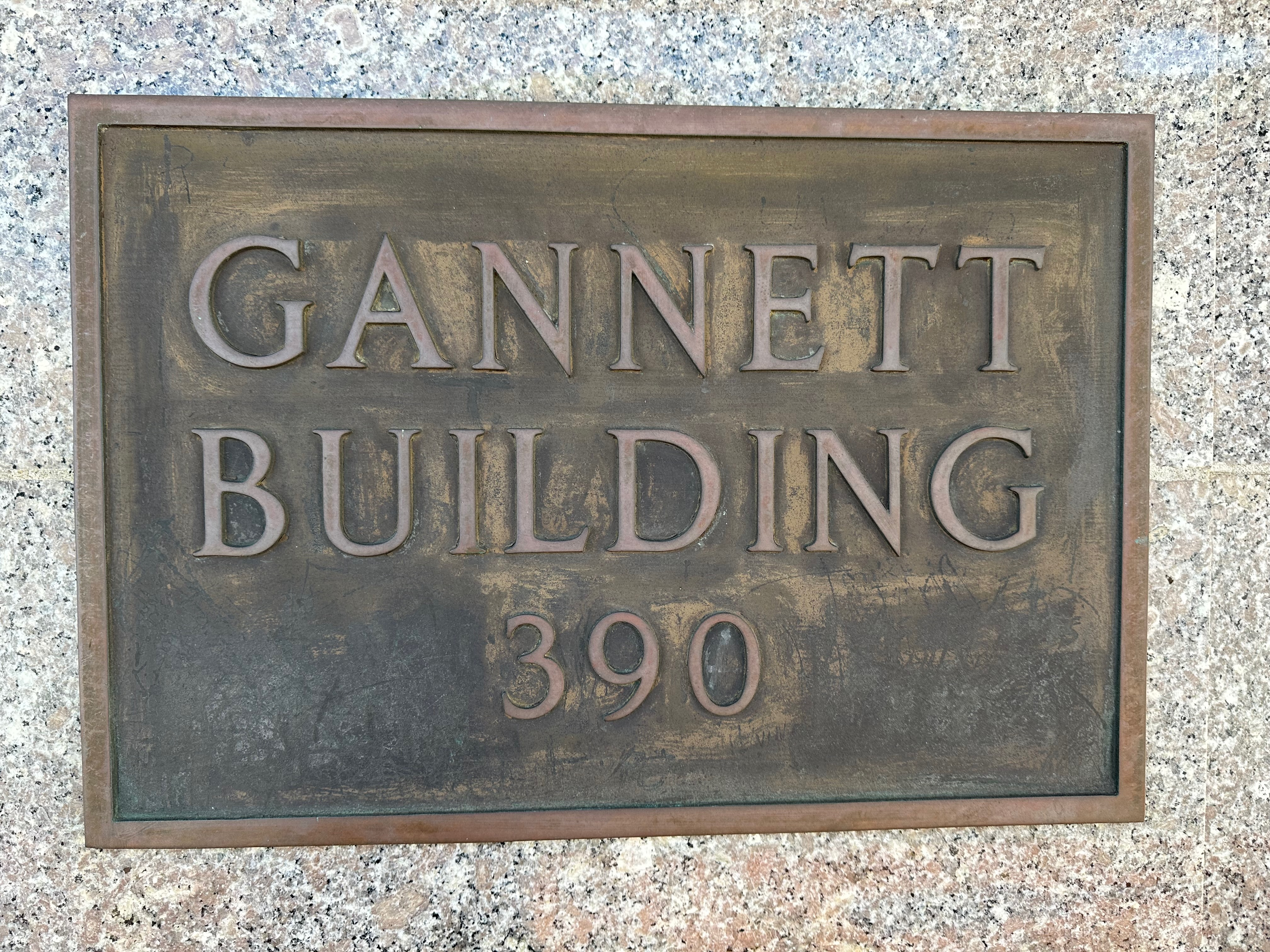
Plaque on the former Press Herald Building

Built in 1923, replacing the Portland Business College building, the seven-story structure held the offices of the Portland Press Herald from 1923 until May 2010. An addition was added to the north side of the building in 1948 after the former Davis Block at 390 Congress Street was demolished. In the 1940s, News of the Day bulletin boards outside the building's Federal Street entrance showed the day's headlines to street traffic.

The newsroom was located on the second floor. Smoking was allowed in the newsroom and waste basket fires were common.

The press was located in the basement. Later a press plant was built across the street at 385 Congress Street, connected to the Press Herald Building by a tunnel running under Congress Street. In 1988, the newspaper opened a $40 million print plant at 295 Gannett Drive in South Portland.

In 2010, under Richard Connor's ownership, the newspaper sold the building and adjacent former printing plant and moved its news staff to the nearby One City Center office building.

In 2016, the newspaper moved its newsroom from One City Center to its print plant in South Portland, but continues to keep an office at One City Center for use by news and advertising staff.

== Press Hotel ==
In 2012, the building was sold to developer Jim Brady with the aim of turning the structure into a hotel. In 2015, the renovated building reopened as a boutique 110-room hotel known as the Press Hotel. The hotel was sold to a San Francisco-based real estate private equity firm in 2021.

Guest rooms include custom wallpaper printed with headlines from the Portland Press Herald and each room has design elements take from a 1920s editor's office. A wall stacked floor-to-ceiling with typewriters is part of the front lobby design, and an art gallery and a gym are located in the basement.

== Preservation award ==
In 2016, Greater Portland Landmarks awarded a Preservation Award to the Press Hotel for the adaptive reuse of the Press Herald Building.
