= Massachusetts Question 1 =

Massachusetts Question 1 may refer to:

- Abolishing the state income tax, 2002 ballot
- Sale of wine by food stores, 2006 ballot
- Massachusetts State Income Tax Repeal Initiative, 2008 ballot
- Massachusetts No Sales Tax for Alcohol Initiative, 2010 ballot
- Massachusetts Right to Repair Initiative, 2012 ballot
- Massachusetts Automatic Gas Tax Increase Repeal Initiative, 2014 ballot
- Massachusetts Expand Slot Machine Gaming Initiative, 2016 ballot
- Nurse-Patient Assignment Limits, 2018 ballot
- Massachusetts Right to Repair Initiative (2020), 2020 ballot
