= Portland Daily Press =

The Portland Daily Press was a daily newspaper published in Portland, Maine, United States from 1862 to 1921.Founded on June 26, 1862, it was generally aligned with the Republican Party. In 1921, the Daily Press merged with the Eastern Argus to form the Portland Press Herald.

The Portland Daily Press was founded in June 1862 by J. T. Gilman, Joseph B. Hall, and Newell A. Foster as a new Republican paper. Its first issue, published on June 23, 1862, announced strong support for Abraham Lincoln and condemned slavery as "the foulest blot upon our national character." Its offices, along with the offices of all the newspapers in the city, were destroyed on July 4, 1866, in Portland's Great Fire. On the morning of July 6, the Portland Daily Press published a double-sided handbill about the fire.

The paper quickly gained the largest circulation in Portland, and was one of five daily newspapers in the city to survive to the 20th century. In 1904, the paper was bought by a syndicate of Maine Republicans, including Henry B. Cleaves and gubernatorial candidate Joseph Homan Manley, who the paper had previously opposed.
