= 2017 Maine referendum =

Two referendums were held in Maine, United States on November 7, 2017 alongside state and national elections. All were citizen-initiated proposals, which cover:

- York County casino proposal: A proposal to award a license to operate a casino in York County to a specific company. It was defeated with 83% voting no.
- Medicaid expansion: A proposal to accept and implement the expansion of Medicaid as called for by the Affordable Care Act. It was passed by voters with 59% voting yes.
