= November 2018 Maine Question 1 =

Question 1: Citizen Initiative
- An Act To Establish Universal Home Care for Seniors and Persons with Disabilities

Results
Choice	Votes	%
Yes	235,679	37.14%
No	398,819	62.86%
- No 50–60% 60–70%

Maine Question 1 is a citizen-initiated referendum that appeared on the November 6, 2018 statewide ballot. It sought to implement a tax on higher incomes in Maine to fund in-home health care services for elderly and disabled Mainers, as well as to create a government board to administer the funds. The vote coincided with general elections for governor, U.S. Senate, U.S. House, the Maine Legislature, and other local elections. It qualified for the ballot due to supporters collecting signatures from registered Maine voters. It was defeated 62.86% to 37.14%.

== Background ==
Supporters, led by the Maine People's Alliance, worked to place their proposal to increase access to home health care in Maine, in response to what they state is the fact that home health care workers have been overworked and underpaid for years. They note that wealthy Mainers have had three income tax reductions in the prior six years, and now pay a lower effective tax rate than most Mainers, while little has been done for home health care workers by the Legislature.

Maine Secretary of State Matthew Dunlap approved the wording of Question 1 on June 25, 2018. The question that will appear on the ballot is: "Do you want to create the Universal Home Care Program to provide home-based assistance to people with disabilities and senior citizens, regardless of income, funded by a new 3.8 percent tax on individuals and families with Maine wage and adjusted gross income above the amount subject to Social Security taxes, which is $128,400 in 2018? This tax is estimated to bring in $310 million a year. The proposal creates a nine member board called the Universal Home Care Trust Fund Board that would administer the funds. Its initial members would be chosen by the Governor, Maine Senate President, and Speaker of the Maine House, who would each choose three to serve a three year term. Subsequent members would be chosen in elections by home health care workers and patients.

Opponents have raised concerns that the proposal is unconstitutional. Former Maine Supreme Judicial Court Chief Justice Daniel Wathen has said the proposal is "deeply unconstitutional in many respects". Opponents also claim the proposal is a "trojan horse" to implement pro-labor union policies in the home health care field, as the proposal classifies home health care workers as state employees for purposes of collective bargaining. Opponents are further concerned that the additional tax will drive high-paid professionals from Maine. Supporters respond to the pro-labor claims of the proposal by conceding that language in the bill is meant to encourage, but not require, union membership, in order to improve working conditions and pay.

== Endorsements ==
Yes

Labor unions

- Maine AFL-CIO
- Service Employees International Union

Organizations

- Caring Across Generations
- Maine Alliance for Retired Americans
- Maine Education Association
- The National Consumer Voice for Quality Long-Term Care
- Paraprofessional Healthcare Institute
No

Statewide officials

- Terry Hayes, Maine State Treasurer and independent candidate for Governor of Maine in 2018
- Janet Mills, Maine Attorney General and Democratic nominee for Governor of Maine in 2018

Individuals

- Shawn Moody, businessman and Republican nominee for governor in 2018

Organizations

- Maine State Chamber of Commerce

Newspapers

- Bangor Daily News
- Kennebec Journal
- Morning Sentinel
- Portland Press Herald

== Polling ==
Date of opinion poll	Conducted by	Sample size (registered voters)	Yes	No	Undecided	Margin of Error
August 2–6, 2018	Suffolk University	500	51%	34%	14%	±4.4%

== Results ==
November 2018 Maine Question 1
Choice	Votes	%
For	235,679	37.14
Against	398,819	62.86
Total	634,498	100.00
