= 2017 United States ballot measures =

- June 11 to November 7, 2017

Part of the 2017 United States elections

A total of 30 ballot measures were placed on statewide ballots in 2017 across the United States while an additional ballot measure was placed on the ballot of Puerto Rico.

Measures are included whether they are initiated by a state legislature or by the citizens of said state. Subheadings are included under a state if there was a measure that was held on a different date with the subheading being the date of the ballot measures.

Results for each measure are included the "Results" heading and not under headings for each state with only whether they passed or not being included.

== By state ==
=== Louisiana ===
Origin	Status	Measure	Description (Result of a "yes" vote)	Date	Yes	No
Legislature	Approved	Louisiana Amendment 1, No Property Tax on Properties Under Construction Measure	Exempt construction projects from property taxes until construction is completed.	Oct 14	266,133; 65.60%	139,549; 34.40%
Legislature	Approved	Louisiana Amendment 2, Property Tax Exemption for Surviving Spouses of Emergency Responders Killed Performing Duties Measure	Provide a property tax exemption for the primary residences of surviving spouses of emergency responders killed while performing duties.	Oct 14	272,042; 67.38%	131,704; 32.62%
Legislature	Approved	Louisiana Amendment 3, Dedicate New Taxes on Fuel to Transportation Construction Fund Measure	Place revenue from new taxes on gasoline, motor fuels, or special fuels created on or after July 1, 2017, in a Construction Subfund for transportation infrastructure projects.	Oct 14	213,433; 53.13%	188,263; 46.87%

=== Maine ===
Origin	Status	Measure	Description (Result of a "yes" vote)	Date	Yes	No
Bond Issue	Approved	Maine Question 1, Technology Sectors Funds and Business Loans Bond Issue	Issue $50 million in bonds for infrastructure and equipment upgrades in the state's targeted technology sectors and loans to businesses with potential for growth and job creation.	Jun 13	63,468; 61.61%	39,549; 38.39%
Citizens	Failed	Maine Question 1, Casino or Slot Machines in York County Initiative	Authorize the Maine Gambling Control Board to accept an application for a license to operate slot machines or a casino in York County, Maine.	Nov 7	57,538; 16.71%	286,847; 83.29%
Citizens	Approved	Maine Question 2, Medicaid Expansion Initiative	Require the state to provide Medicaid through MaineCare for persons under the age of 65 and with incomes equal to or below 138 percent of the federal poverty line.	Nov 7	203,080; 58.95%	141,436; 41.05%
Bond Issue	Approved	Maine Question 3, Transportation Bond Issue	Issue $105 million in bonds for transportation infrastructure projects.	Nov 7	246,828; 71.99%	96,017; 28.01%
Legislature	Approved	Maine Question 4, Public Pension Unfunded Liabilities from Experience Losses Amendment	Increase from 10 years to 20 years the time required for the state to pay off the Maine Public Employees Retirement System's (MainePERS) unfunded liabilities created by experience losses (i.e., losses resulting from the difference between expected performance and the actual outcome in investments).	Nov 7	208,924; 63.03%	122,545; 36.97%

=== New Jersey ===
Origin	Status	Measure	Description (Result of a "yes" vote)	Date	Yes	No
Bond Issue	Approved	New Jersey Public Question 1, Bonds for Public Libraries Measure	Authorize the state to issue $125 million in bonds to provide grants to public libraries.	Nov 7	970,334; 60.03%	646,110; 39.97%
Legislature	Approved	New Jersey Public Question 2, Revenue from Environmental Damage Lawsuits Dedicated to Environmental Projects Amendment	Allocate state revenue from legal settlements related to natural resource damages in cases of environmental contamination toward restoring and protecting natural resources and paying the costs of pursuing the settlements.	Nov 7	1,093,448; 69.02%	490,763; 30.97%

=== New York ===
Origin	Status	Measure	Description (Result of a "yes" vote)	Date	Yes	No
Automatic Referral	Failed	New York Proposal 1, Constitutional Convention Question	Hold a constitutional convention to develop and propose changes to the state constitution that voters would vote on at the election on November 5, 2019.	Nov 7	594,820; 16.97%	2,910,868; 83.03%
Legislature	Approved	New York Proposal 2, Pension Forfeiture for Convicted Officials Amendment	Authorize judges to reduce or revoke the public pension of a public officer convicted of a felony related to his or her official duties.	Nov 7	2,512,671; 73.15%	922,195; 26.85%
Legislature	Approved	New York Proposal 3, Forest Preserve Land Bank Amendment	Create a 250-acre land bank, which would allow local governments to request state Forest Preserve land for qualifying projects in exchange for the state adding 250 new acres to the preserve; and allow bike paths, sewer lines, and utility lines within the width of highways on preserve land.	Nov 7	1,755,081; 52.31%	1,600,167; 47.69%

=== Ohio ===
Origin	Status	Measure	Description (Result of a "yes" vote)	Date	Yes	No
Citizens	Approved	Ohio Issue 1, Marsy's Law Crime Victim Rights Initiative	Repeal Section 10a of Article I of the Ohio Constitution, a section addressing the rights of crime victims, and replace the section with a Marsy's Law; a separate collection of specific rights for crime victims.	Nov 7	1,921,172; 82.59%	404,957; 17.41%
Citizens	Failed	Ohio Issue 2, Drug Price Standards Initiative	Require state agencies and programs to purchase prescription drugs at prices no higher than what the U.S. Department of Veterans Affairs pays for them.	Nov 7	483,983; 20.85%	1,837,608; 79.15%

=== Pennsylvania ===
Origin	Status	Measure	Description (Result of a "yes" vote)	Date	Yes	No
Legislature	Approved	Pennsylvania Allow Local Taxing Authorities to Exempt Full Value of Homestead Amendment	Allow the state legislature to increase the amount of a home's assessed value that local taxing authorities―counties, municipalities, and school districts―are permitted to exempt from taxes. The amendment increased the amount from up to 50 percent of the median value of all homesteads within their jurisdictions to up to 100 percent of the assessed value of each homestead.	Nov 7	963,324; 53.99%	821,002; 46.01%

=== Texas ===
Origin	Status	Measure	Description (Result of a "yes" vote)	Date	Yes	No
Legislature	Approved	Texas Proposition 1, Property Tax Exemption for Partially Disabled Veteran with Donated House Amendment	Allow the legislature to provide partially-disabled veterans or their surviving spouses with a property tax exemption equal to the percentage of their disability if the veteran's home was donated to him or her by a charity for less than market value.	Nov 7	754,739; 86.00%	122,864; 14.00%
Legislature	Approved	Texas Proposition 2, Home Equity Loan Amendment	Make changes to the home equity borrowing system in Texas. Changes included lowering the cap on home equity loan-related fees from 3 to 2 percent but excluding certain additional fees from counting towards this cap; allowing home equity loans against agricultural property; allowing the refinancing of a home equity loan with a purchase money loan; and allowing advances on a home equity line of credit as long as the principal amount remained below 80 percent of the fair market value of a borrower's house.	Nov 7	593,052; 68.85%	270,780; 31.35%
Legislature	Approved	Texas Proposition 3, Appointed Officer Term Expiration Amendment	Provide that unsalaried officials appointed by the governor with consent of the Senate cannot be in office beyond the end of the legislative session following the expiration of their terms.	Nov 7	722,753; 83.16%	146,390; 16.84%
Legislature	Approved	Texas Proposition 4, Require Court to Provide Notice to Attorney General Amendment	Allow the legislature to pass laws requiring courts to inform the state attorney general of a legal challenge to the constitutionality of a state law.	Nov 7	554,040; 64.87%	300,096; 35.13%
Legislature	Approved	Texas Proposition 5, Definition of Professional Sports Team in Charitable Raffles Amendment	Expand the definition of professional sports team for the purpose of deciding which charitable foundations are allowed to hold raffles.	Nov 7	510,363; 60.33%	335,582; 39.67%
Legislature	Approved	Texas Proposition 6, Property Tax Exemption for Surviving Spouses of First Responders Killed in Line of Duty Amendment	Allow the legislature to provide a property tax exemption for the residence homes of surviving spouses of first responders killed in the line of duty.	Nov 7	739,452; 84.64%	134,167; 15.36%
Legislature	Approved	Texas Proposition 7, Financial Institutions to Offer Prizes to Promote Savings Amendment	Authorize the legislature to allow banks, credit unions, and other financial institutions to promote savings by offering their customers prizes drawn at random.	Nov 7	511,806; 59.70%	345,556; 40.30%

=== Washington ===
Origin	Status	Measure	Description (Result of a "yes" vote)	Date	Yes	No
Advisory Question	Failed	Washington Advisory Vote 16, Commercial Fishing Licenses, Fees, and Taxes Bill	Support House Bill 1597, advising the legislature to continue the changes made to commercial fishing licenses, fees, and taxes to increase state revenue an estimated $6.4 million over 10 years.	Nov 7	671,095; 45.59%	800,896; 54.41%
Advisory Question	Failed	Washington Advisory Vote 17, Sales and Use Tax and Business and Occupation Tax Bill	Support to House Bill 2163, advising the legislature to continue eliminating sales and use tax exceptions for bottled water and self-produced fuel (except biomass fuels); requiring certain remote sellers to collect sales and use taxes or post info for consumers on filing a use tax return; and extending the economic nexus for the collection of business and occupation taxes, to increase state revenue $564.6 million over 10 years.	Nov 7	553,425; 37.66%	916,050; 62.34%
Advisory Question	Failed	Washington Advisory Vote 18, State Property Tax for Schools Bill	Support House Bill 2242, advising the legislature to continue increasing the state property tax to $2.70 per $1,000 of assessed value to provide $12.95 billion in estimated funding for state common schools over 10 years.	Nov 7	606,075; 40.95%	874,043; 59.05%

=== West Virginia ===
Origin	Status	Measure	Description (Result of a "yes" vote)	Date	Yes	No
Legislature	Approved	West Virginia Amendment 1, Bonds for Roads and Bridges Measure	Authorize the state to issue and sell up to $1.6 billion in state bonds to fund highway, road, and bridge construction and improvements.	Oct 7	89,186; 72.85%	33,233; 27.15%

== By jurisdiction ==
=== Puerto Rico ===
Origin	Status	Measure	Description (Result of a "yes" vote)	Date	Statehood	Free association/Independence	Current territorial status
Legislature	Approved	Puerto Rico Statehood, Independence, Free Association, or Current Status Referendum	A vote for statehood supported requesting the admission of Puerto Rico as a state of the United States of America. A vote for free association/independence supported requesting free association with the U.S. or independence from the U.S. A vote for current territorial status supported maintaining Puerto Rico's existing political status as subject to the Territory Clause of the U.S. Constitution.	Jun 11	502,801; 97.18%	7,786; 1.50%	6,823; 1.32%
