= Henry Lord =

Henry Lord may refer to:

- Henry W. Lord (1821–1891), American politician from Michigan
- Henry Lord (Maine politician), American politician from Maine
- Henry C. Lord (1824–1884), president of the Atchison, Topeka and Santa Fe Railway
