= NCCN =

NCCN may refer to:

- National Competitiveness Council of Nigeria
- National Comprehensive Cancer Network
- NCCN, the molecular formula of cyanogen

== See also ==
- The National Consumer Voice for Quality Long-Term Care (formerly abbreviated to NCCNHR)
