= Eldercare Workforce Alliance =

- Abbreviation: EWA
- Formation: 2009
- Type: Advocacy coalition
- Legal status: Fiscally sponsored project
- Headquarters: Washington, D.C., U.S.
- Members: 35 member organizations (including federal liaisons)
- Key people: Amy M. York (Executive Director)
- Website: eldercareworkforce.org

The Eldercare Workforce Alliance (EWA), a project of the Tides Center, is a coalition of 35 US national organizations that came together to focus on short- and long-term healthcare workforce issues relating to older adults. The Alliance helped pass the 2018 Raise Family Caregivers Act, supports ongoing funding for the Title VII Geriatrics Workforce Enhancement Program, and advocates for including elder care in government and professional policies, including related questions of educating and maintaining the labor force such care requires.

== History ==
EWA was announced in 2009 at a Washington, D.C. meeting of more than two dozen organizations concerned about shortages and training needs in geriatrics, long-term services and supports, and related care roles. The alliance’s formation followed the Institute of Medicine’s 2008 call for expanded education and training across disciplines to meet the needs of an aging population.

== Mission and activities ==
EWA describes its mission as advancing federal and state policies intended to strengthen and expand the eldercare workforce, including workforce recruitment and retention, education and training, and supports for family caregivers. The alliance publishes policy materials and advocacy resources and participates in policy discussions through letters, briefings, and submissions to government bodies.

=== Federal workforce training and geriatrics programs ===
EWA has advocated for funding and implementation of federal workforce programs related to geriatrics and eldercare, including training initiatives within the Public Health Service Act and workforce-related provisions in the Affordable Care Act.

== Membership ==
EWA is composed of national organizations spanning professional associations, providers, consumer and caregiver organizations, workforce groups, and research and education entities. As of 2026, EWA’s website listed 35 member organizations and several federal agency participants designated as liaisons:

- AARP
- Administration for Community Living
- Alzheimer's Association
- Alzheimer's Foundation of America
- AMDA: LTC Medicine
- American Academy of Nursing
- American Association for Geriatric Psychiatry
- The American Association of Post-Acute Care Nursing
- American Geriatrics Society (Alliance Co-Convener)
- American Health Care Association and National Center for Assisted Living
- American Nurses Association
- American Physical Therapy Association
- American Psychological Association
- American Society of Consultant Pharmacists
- American Society on Aging
- Caring Across Generations
- The Center for Aging & Disability Education & Research
- Center For Health and Social Care Integration
- Coalition of Geriatric Nursing Organizations
- Community Catalyst
- Cooperative Development Foundation
- Council on Social Work Education
- Family Caregiver Alliance
- Gerontological Society of America
- Hartford Institute for Geriatric Nursing
- Health Resources and Services Administration
- LeadingAge
- National Alliance for Caregiving
- National Association for Geriatric Education
- National Association of Social Workers
- The National Consumer Voice for Quality Long-Term Care
- National Council on Aging
- National Hispanic Council on Aging
- National Pace Association
- THE GREEN HOUSE Project
- Office of Women's Health (department of Housing and Human Services)
- New York Academy of Medicine/Social Work Leadership Institute
- PHI - Quality Care through Quality Jobs (Alliance Co-Convener)
- Service Employers International Union
- USAGING
- U.S. Department of Veterans Affairs (Federal Liaison)

== See also ==
- Geriatrics
- Long-term care
- Caregiver
