= Portland Sunday Telegram =

Portland Sunday Telegram was a newspaper published in Portland, Maine. It was founded in 1888 by C. B. Anderson and was first published on May 1, 1888, by C. B. Anderson & Company. Its first editor was George B. Bagley. Bagley, who was concurrently the publisher of The Portland Globe, acquired the Portland Sunday Telegram' from Anderson not long after the newspaper started publishing. At this point Thomas J. Flaherty became editor and manager of the paper; a position he maintained until his death in 1927. In 1928 the Portland Sunday Telegram merged with the Portland Press Herald to form the Portland Sunday Telegram and Sunday Press Herald.
