= Virginia Question 1 =

Virginia Question 1 may refer to:

- 2006 Virginia Question 1, a ballot question to prohibit same-sex marriage
- 2020 Virginia Question 1, a ballot question to change the congressional redistricting process
- 2026 Virginia Question 1, a ballot question to expand reproductive rights
