= Henri Seroka =

Belgian singer and composer (born 1949)

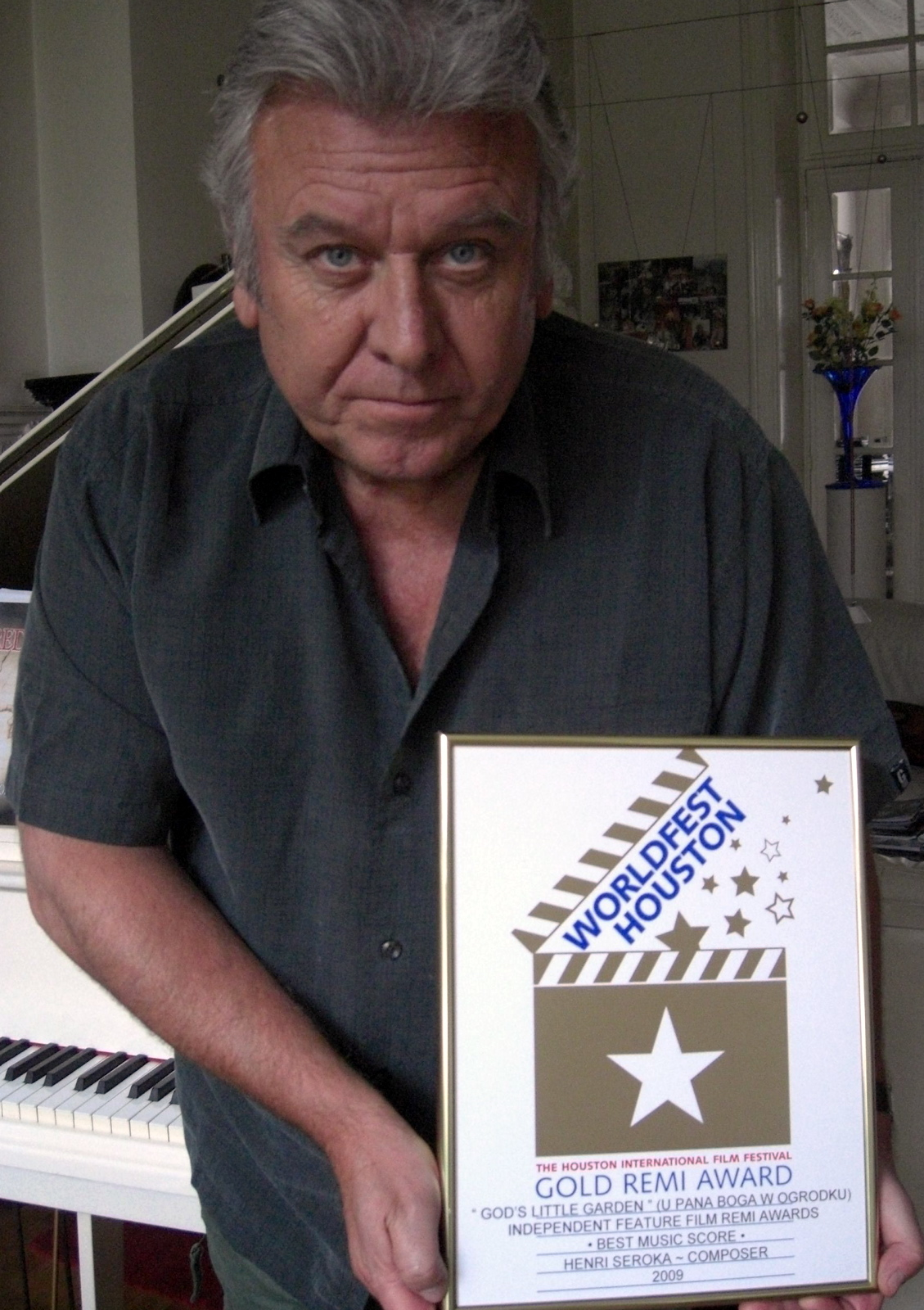
Henri Seroka, 2009

Henri Seroka (born 1949) is a Belgian singer and composer. Although he began his career as a singer, he is known mostly for his compositions, especially film music, and for composing Belgium's official song for the 1984 Olympic Games.

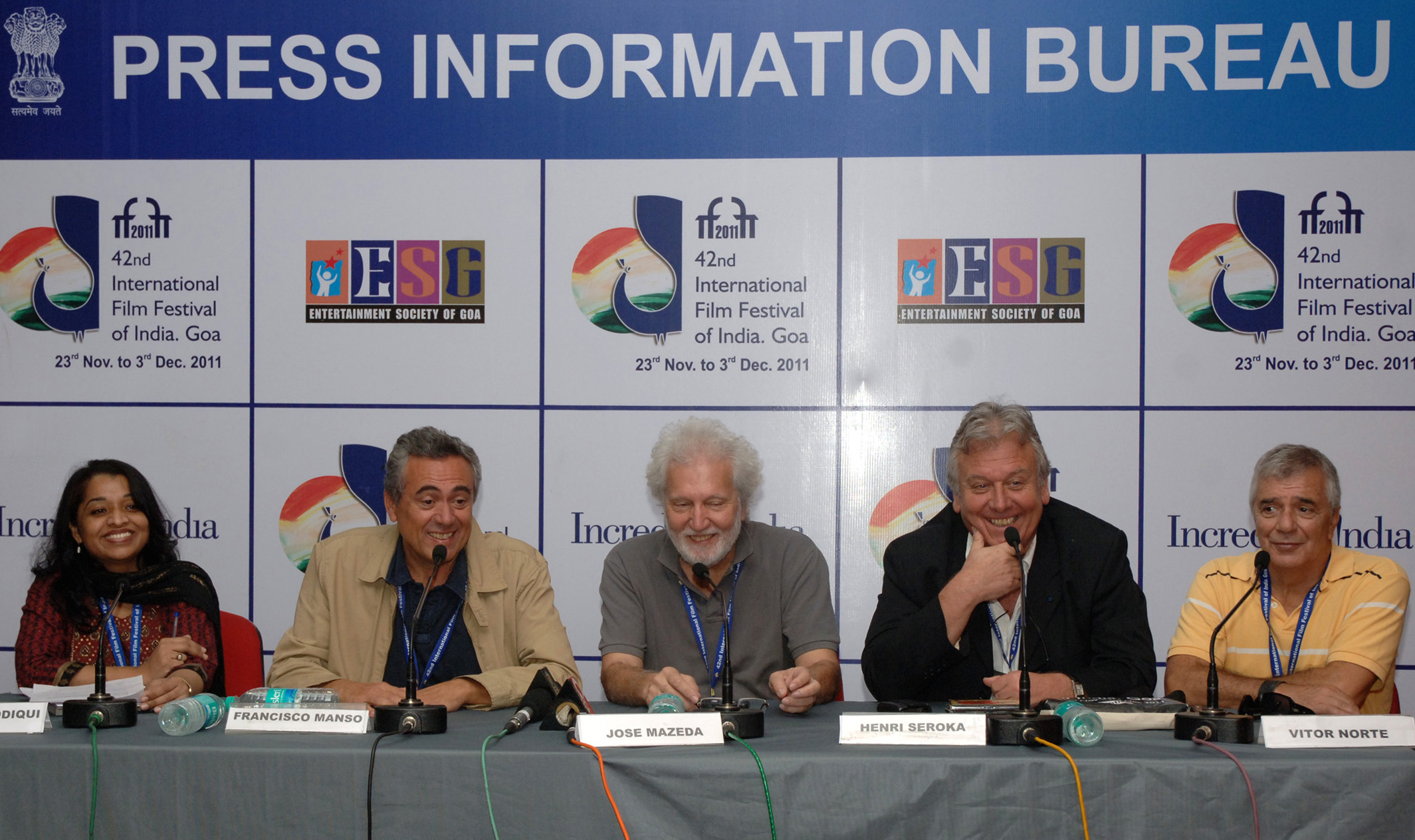
Henri Seroka (second from right), IFFI (2011)

== Biography ==
Seroka was born in Anderlecht. His father was Polish and served under General Stanisław Maczek during World War II, while his mother was German. His first record was "Laissez moi pleurer" (1968). In Poland, he is most well known for his film music in Jacek Bromski's films. They collaborated on Sztuka kochania (1989), U Pana Boga za piecem (1998), U Pana Boga w ogródku (2007), U Pana Boga za miedzą (2009) and on the TV serial U Pana Boga w ogródku (2007). Outside of Poland he is known for composing the music for the Smurfs cartoons.

In 2004 he composed Credo, a five-part classical piece for full orchestra and choir. It was performed several times, including on 1 September 2006 in a Berlin church and on 15 October 2006 in the Basilica of Jasna Góra. On 1 October 2008 it was played by 100 musicians in the Royal Conservatory of Brussels . The concerts were held in memory of General Stanisław Maczek and the Polish 1st Armoured Division. Seroka himself conducted the performances.

His first record was "Laissez moi pleurer" (1968), and one of his last is "Norda" (2008), music inspired by the old wooden sailing vessel Norda.
