= May Craig (journalist) =

American journalist (1889–1975)

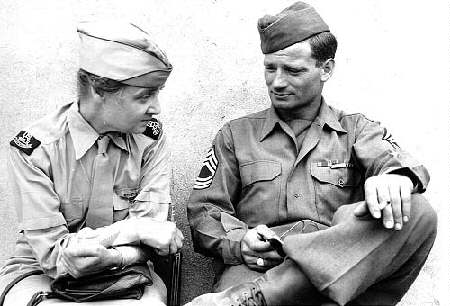
- Craig interviewing a soldier during the Second World War
- Born: December 19, 1889; Near Beaufort, South Carolina
- Died: July 15, 1975 (aged 86); Silver Spring, Maryland
- Occupation: Journalist

Elisabeth May Adams Craig (December 19, 1889 – July 15, 1975) was an American journalist best known for her reports on the Second World War, Korean War and U.S. politics. She was a member of the National American Woman Suffrage Association, and was also a campaigner for equality in children's education. She was the first woman journalist to be allowed on a battleship and the first to receive press credentials from the U.S. Navy. A section of the Civil Rights Act of 1964 is named for Craig. Due to her Maine connections, colleagues and politicians referred to her as “tough as a lobster.”

== Biography ==
May Craig was born in 1889, near Beaufort, South Carolina, where her father worked at the Coosaw Mines, a phosphate mine. Her mother died when she was young, and afterwards she became a foster child of the wealthy family who owned the mine. She was raised largely in Washington, D.C. She married Donald A. Craig, who was the Washington correspondent for the New York Herald. The couple had two children. She died in Silver Spring, Maryland, at age 86. The New York Times headlined her obituary "Feisty Capital Writer, Dies."

== Journalism career ==
=== Portland Press Herald ===
Although Craig was a Southerner, she got her break in journalism working for the Maine-based Guy Gannett chain of newspapers (including the Portland Press Herald). She became the company's Washington correspondent, and wrote her Inside Washington column for almost fifty years. She took on leadership roles within both the Women's National Press Club and Eleanor Roosevelt's Press Conference Association, both organisations supporting women in journalism.

During the Second World War, Craig secured a succession of postings to Europe. From this vantage point, she gave eyewitness accounts of the V-bomb attacks on London, the Battle of Normandy and the liberation of Paris. During the war, she constantly battled with the male military commanders and male journalists to have access to the news. One of her best-known quotations is a reference to facilities, the lack of which was often given as reason for not allowing Craig to follow up on the news. She joked that, "Bloody Mary of England once said that when she died they would find Calais graven on her heart" (in reference to a key French outpost lost during Mary's reign); "When I die, there will be the word facilities, so often it has been used to prevent me from doing what men reporters could do."

=== Meet the Press ===
With 243 appearances, Craig was second in the number of appearances on NBC's "Meet the Press" behind David Broder. Craig always wore a hat and gloves on the program, according to her, "so that people would remember who she is."

== May Craig Amendment ==
The May Craig Amendment to the Civil Rights Act of 1964 resulted from her suggestion to a Virginia congressman Howard Smith on an episode of NBC’s “Meet the Press" that employment discrimination on the basis of sex should be prohibited.

== Transcript of Craig at a White-House press conference ==
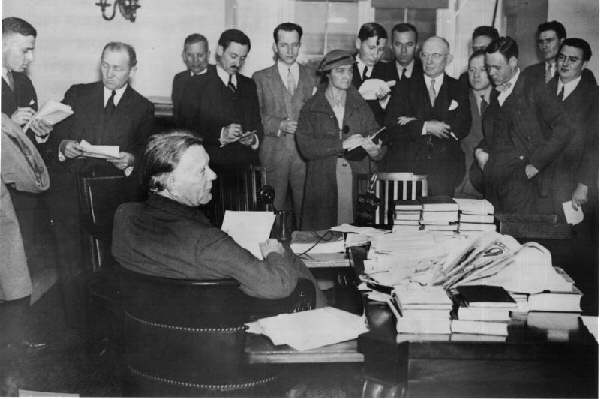
Craig interviewing William Edgar Borah

This is a transcript of a press conference held by Franklin D. Roosevelt on December 9, 1941, at 4:10 p.m. It was the first American news conference of the war.

MISS MAY CRAIG: You've got a new system out there. (Referring to security at the entrance.)

THE PRESIDENT: What?

MISS MAY CRAIG: A new system out there. It's going to take a long time to get in.

THE PRESIDENT: What's that? What do you have to do? Have they frisked you? (Laughter)

MISS MAY CRAIG: Practically.

THE PRESIDENT: Now May, I don't think that's nice.

MISS MAY CRAIG: They did Fred Hale once.

THE PRESIDENT: I will have to hire a female Secret Service agent around here to do the frisking.

MISS MAY CRAIG: Remember the time they frisked Senator Hale at a reception?

THE PRESIDENT: Terribly funny.

MISS MAY CRAIG: He never got over it.

THE PRESIDENT: He never got over it.

MISS MAY CRAIG: The sacred Hale person.

THE PRESIDENT: He was here before you and I were born. (Pause here as newspapermen continue to file in.)

...

THE PRESIDENT: Well, the only thing I can think of is—on that—you know occasionally I have a few people in to dinner, and generally in the middle of dinner some—I know she isn't—it isn't an individual, it's just a generic term—some "sweet young thing" says, "Mr. President, couldn't you tell us about so and so?"

Well, the other night this "sweet young thing" in the middle of supper said, "Mr. President, couldn't you tell us about the bombing? Where did those planes start from and go to?" And I said, "Yes. I think the time has now come to tell you. They came from our new secret base at Shangri-La!" (Laughter)

And she believed it! (More laughter)

Q: Mr. President, is this the same young lady you talked about -- (Loud laughter interrupted)

THE PRESIDENT: No. This is a generic term. It happens to be a woman.

MISS MAY CRAIG: Is it always feminine? (Laughter)

THE PRESIDENT: What?

MISS MAY CRAIG: Is it always feminine? (Loud Laughter)

THE PRESIDENT: Now May, why did you ask me that?

MISS MAY CRAIG: I wondered.

THE PRESIDENT: I call it a "sweet young thing." Now when I talk about manpower that includes the women, and when I talk about a "sweet young thing," that includes young men. (Again loud laughter)
