= Wishbone rig =

Type of sailboat rigging

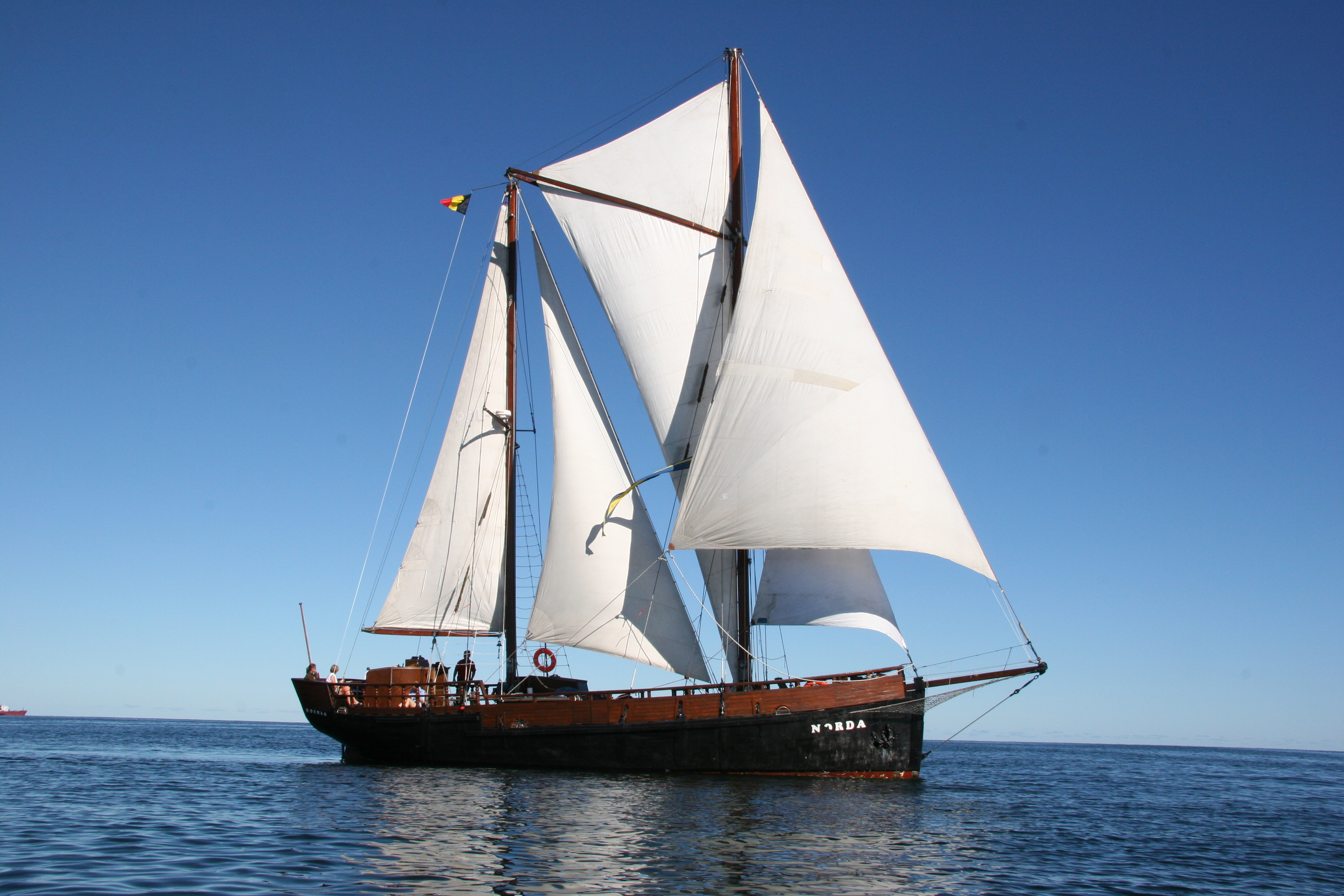
Example of wishbone ketch on S/Y Norda. Note that the gaff is fixed on the first mast and that it has one leg on both sides of the sail.

A wishbone rig, sometimes also known as fishbone ketch, is a type of rigging on sailboats. This rigging is most popular on heavy two-masted vessels. The rig gets its name from the wishbone, a V- or Y-shaped spar similar to the rig's gaff. A ketch rigged in this fashion is called wishbone ketch. Examples of wishbone-rigged boats include the Zawisza Czarny and the Norda.

== Definition ==
A wishbone ketch rigged vessel is a vessel that is rigged as a ketch where a permanent splitting gaff is mounted between two masts. Contrary to the gaff rig (where the gaff is hoisted together with the sail) the gaff stays in the mast. The gaff is typically fixed on the first mast (the one closer to the front) and fixed via a line to the aftmost mast. These lines allow the sail to be trimmed to suit the wind.

== Advantages and disadvantages ==
Advantages:

- Easier to hoist the sail than with a gaff rig
- Offers a large sail area (advantageous in light winds) - the entire area between the masts can be covered

Disadvantages:

- Potential dangerous situation in case of unplanned jibe, therefore difficult to use in broad reach (see points of sail)
- Puts significant strain on the top of the aft most mast
- Additional weight high in the mast (although this rig is generally used only on heavy boats)

== See also ==
- Sail-plan
- Ketch
