= Zawisza Czarny (ship) =

Polish scouts training sailing ships

Coordinates: 54°40′42″N 18°34′06″E

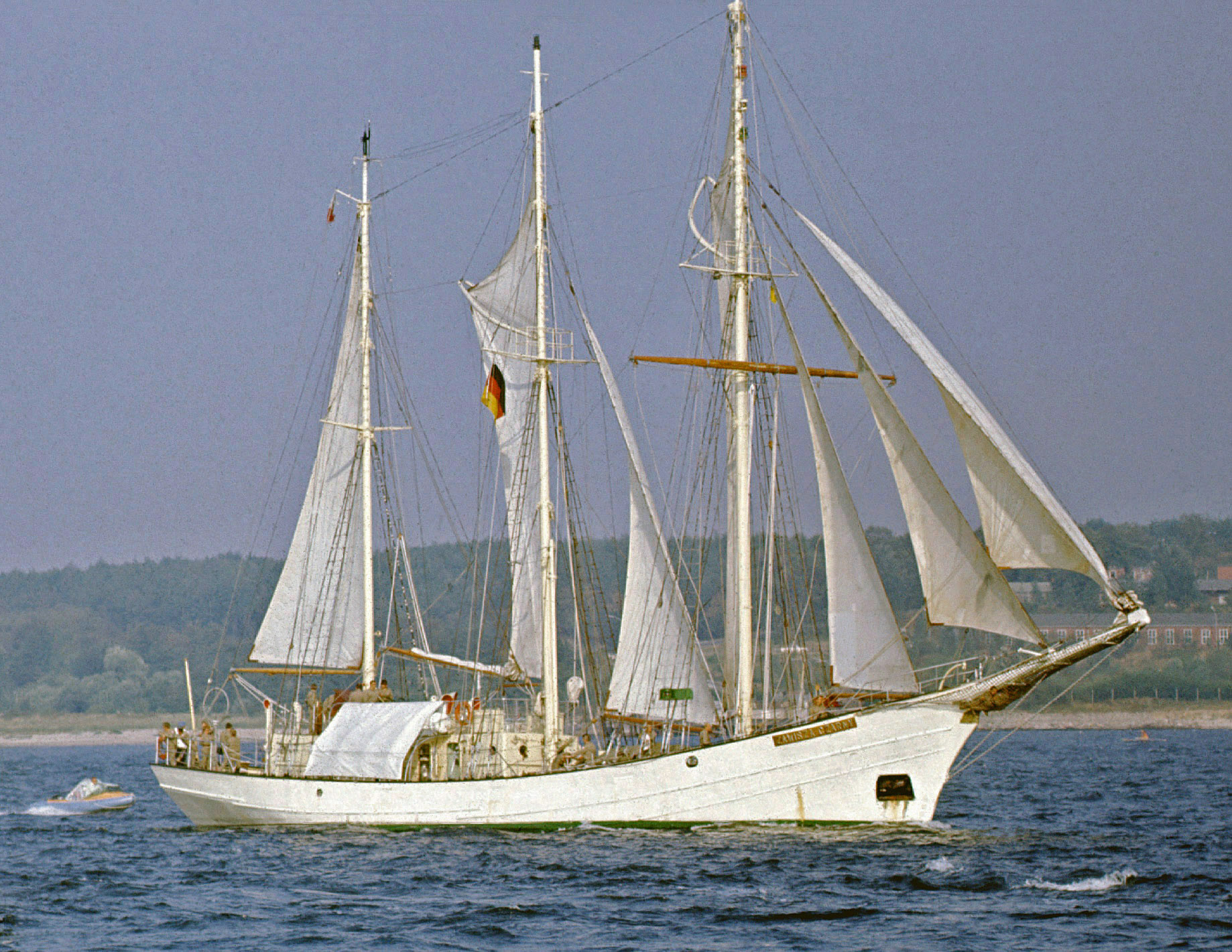
- Zawisza Czarny 1972 in Kiel

History

Poland
- Name: Zawisza Czarny
- Owner: Polish Scouting and Guiding Association, ZHP
- Builder: Remontowa Shipbuilding SA, Gdańsk
- Launched: 1952
- Renamed: Cietrzew
- Identification: MMSI number: 261334000; Callsign: SPGZ

General characteristics
- Class & type: Sailing yacht
- Tonnage: 164 GRT
- Length: 42.70 m (140 ft 1 in)
- Beam: 6.70 m (22 ft 0 in)
- Draught: 4.60 m (15 ft 1 in)
- Propulsion: 439 m^{2} (4,730 sq ft) Sail and 390 hp (290 kW) Krups diesel engine
- Sail plan: staysail schooner
- Complement: Up to 46

Zawisza Czarny is the name of two Polish sailing ships owned by the Polish Scouting and Guiding Association, ZHP.

== History ==
Zawsisza Czarny used to be a fishing vessel. After that use it was rebuilt to become a sailing vessel. Three masts were fitted on it and the motor that was built in was an old motor from a U-boat.

One of the most interesting sailing voyages is certainly its trip to Cape Horn.

Remarkable are also the sailing trips during which half of the crew consisted of blind people.

It is now owned by the Polish Scouting and Guiding Association, ZHP and its home harbor is Gdynia.

== Rig ==
The rig is one of a very rare kind. The three masts are rigged as a wishbone ketch. Only a few sailing vessels are using it today and it is mainly seen on smaller units.

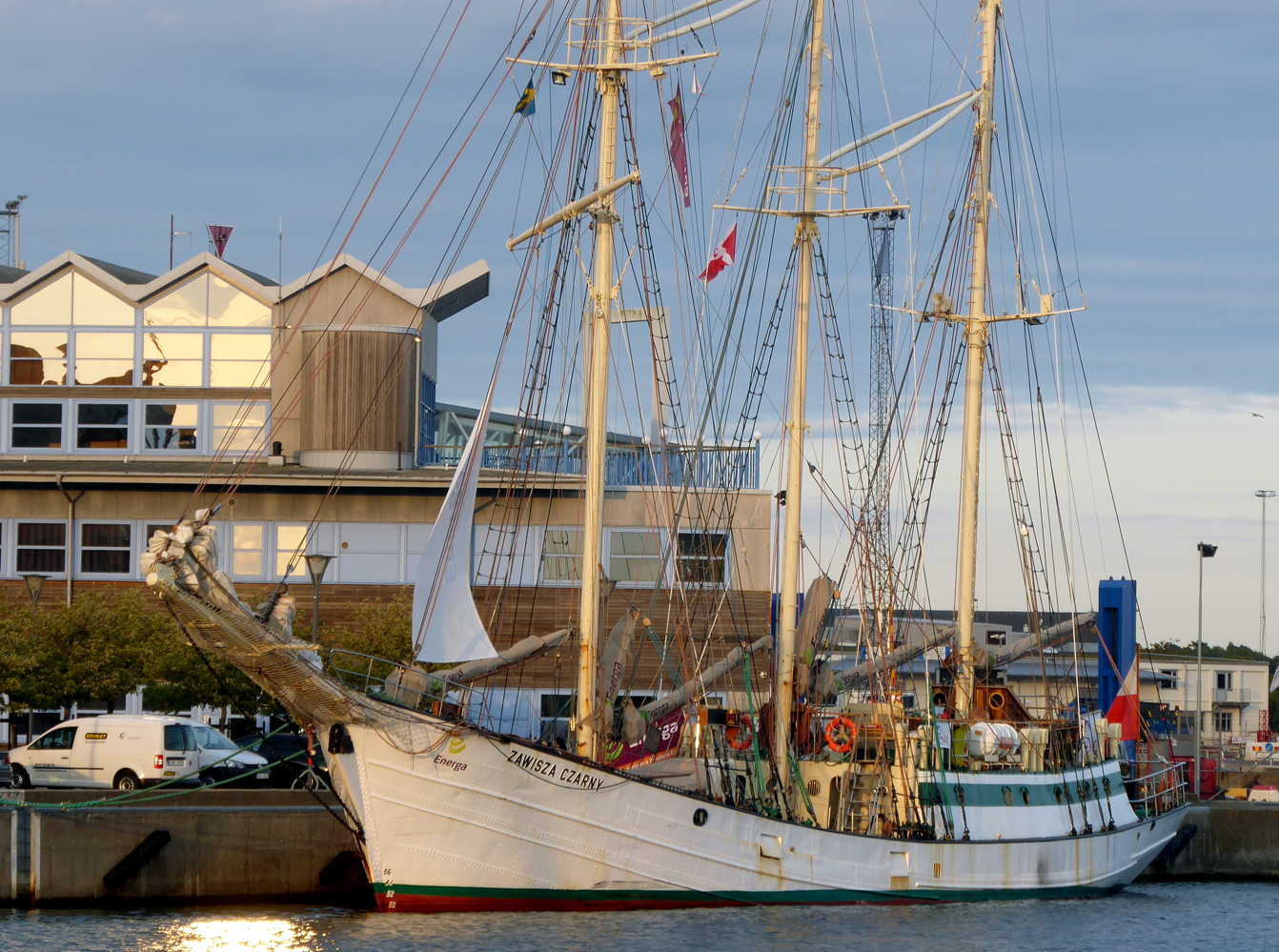
Zawisza Czarny in Ystad port on 15 August 2018.

== See also ==
- Zawisza Czarny
