= Companionship Exemption =

United States labor law

The companionship exemption refers to federal labor regulations in the United States that exclude workers providing companionship services to the elderly or disabled from the federal minimum wage and overtime protections that apply to most other American workers.

The exemption came into existence in 1974 through an amendment to the Fair Labor Standards Act (FLSA). While the main purpose of the amendment was to expand labor protections to domestic workers, two exceptions were included: one for those serving as “casual” babysitters and another for those providing “companionship services for individuals who (because of age or infirmity) are unable to care for themselves.”

== Controversy over application to home care workers ==
The United States Department of Labor (DOL) holds significant discretion over how the companionship exemption is interpreted and applied in the workplace. Under the DOL's current interpretation, the companionship exemption applies to most home care workers (also known as personal care assistants), allowing their employers—unless they are in a state with regulations superseding those at the federal level—to pay below minimum wage and avoid overtime compensation.

Since the companionship exemption was put in place, a variety of unsuccessful efforts have been made through legislation, court challenges, and by the DOL itself to narrow the exemption so that more home care workers become eligible for minimum wage and overtime. In 2007, the case Long Island Care at Home, Ltd. v. Coke brought the issue of the companionship exemption in front of the United States Supreme Court. In this case, home care worker Evelyn Coke claimed she was unfairly denied minimum wage and overtime pay by her employer. While the court ruled against Coke, its decision reaffirmed the DOL's authority to change its interpretation of the exemption at any time. The New York Times has written three editorials calling for an end to the companionship exemption.

The disability community and many home care workers are concerned that the proposed changes will force seniors and people with disabilities into institutions, cut the take-home pay of attendants, reduce the available attendant workforce, force people with disabilities to cut the hours of longtime attendants and bring strangers into their homes, and devastate consumer directed services. They point out that the administration failed to adequately engage the disability community as described in Executive Order 13563. The National Council on Disability sent a letter urging the Obama administration to use a negotiated rule-making to address this oversight.

== Current status ==
The Obama administration announced in December 2011 that it has proposed a regulation amending the companionship exemption. If implemented, the regulation would grant minimum wage and overtime protections to home care workers throughout the U.S. The regulation will become a final rule following a 60-day comment period.

ADAPT still considers the issue unresolved.

On September 17, 2013, the U.S. Department of Labor announced a final rule extending the Fair Labor Standards Act's minimum wage and overtime protections to most of the nation's workers who provide essential home care assistance to elderly people and people with illnesses, injuries or disabilities. The Obama administration anticipated that this change would provide FLSA protections to nearly two million direct care workers—such as home health aides, personal care aides and certified nursing assistant and help guarantee that those who rely on the assistance of direct care workers have access to consistent and high-quality care from a stable and increasingly professional workforce. With an unprecedented 15-month implementation timeframe, the narrowing on the companionship exemption under FLSA, becomes effective January 1, 2015. The final rule, released October 2013, is intended to provide additional protections under FLSA for homecare workers and has been accompanied by dedicated webpages on the DOL's Wage an Hour website.
