= 2011 Maine Question 1 =

Question 1: People's Veto
- Do you want to reject the section of Chapter 399 of the Public Laws of 2011 that requires new voters to register to vote at least two business days prior to an election?

Results
Choice	Votes	%
Yes	237,024	60.44%
No	155,156	39.56%
Valid votes	392,180	99.08%
Invalid or blank votes	3,627	0.92%
Total votes	395,807	100.00%
Yes
60–70%
50–60%

Maine Question 1 was a 2011 people's veto referendum that rejected a bill repealing Election Day voter registration in Maine. The vote was held on November 8, 2011, after being placed on the ballot due to supporters collecting the necessary number of signatures. The veto effort was successful, with 237,024 votes in favor of repeal to 155,156 against repeal.

== Background ==
Maine has permitted same-day voter registration since 1973. Upon taking control of both houses of the Maine Legislature and the Governor's office simultaneously for the first time since 1963 in 2010, the Republicans passed LD 1376, which was signed by Gov. Paul LePage on June 21, 2011. The bill, sponsored by Speaker Robert Nutting, eliminated same-day voter registration along with prohibiting registration and absentee voting two business days before an election. Maine Secretary of State Charlie Summers, in announcing his support for the bill, stated that "This is designed to relieve stresses on the system. People can try to assign falsehoods and nefarious reasons behind it, but that’s not what this is about." Summers also wrote an editorial in which he stated that the bill was a proactive step to secure the integrity of elections, and not a step to prevent voter fraud. He also rejected the idea by opponents of the bill that same-day registration led to increased voter turnout, noting both that such turnout was high before same-day registration and increased with the passage of moter-voter legislation in 1990.

The Maine chapter of AARP testified in opposition to the bill, claiming that it would make it harder for some senior citizens to vote, who would then have to go to their town or city office twice to register and vote instead of once.

Maine Republican Party Chairman Charlie Webster generated controversy when claiming during the runup to LD 1376's passage that Democrats used same-day registration to "intentionally steal elections" and that they had "bused voters" into Maine to vote due to the allowing of same-day registration. He later toned down his comments to state that he thought Democrats used same-day registration to "influence" elections, especially through college students and Job Corps members voting. Democrats heavily criticized his comments, claiming it reflected a true agenda of wanting to make electoral gains at democracy's expense.

After passage of the bill, supporters of same-day registration launched a petition drive on July 8, 2011, to put the issue on the ballot though the group Protect Maine Votes. The question approved for circulation on the petition forms was "Do you want to reject the section of Chapter 399 of the Public Laws of 2011 that requires new voters to register to vote at least two business days prior to an election?" They did not seek to repeal the portion of the law regarding absentee voting. Some city clerks like the one in Bangor stated that they favored that portion of the law but had little issue with same-day registration.

During the petition drive, supporters were critical of Webster and Secretary Summers for holding press conferences discussing voter fraud, claiming they were doing so to "play politics" and distract from the petition gathering effort.

Supporters turned in over 68,000 signatures to Secretary Summers by the deadline of August 8, 2011, well over the required number of 57,277. Summers announced 30 days later that enough signatures were verified to place the question on the ballot. As the only people's veto question to reach the ballot, it was automatically numbered Question 1 per Maine law.

== Campaign ==
Nutting and other opponents of repeal stated that their primary intent in passing the original bill was to reduce the workload on municipal clerks, who saw increased absentee and same-day voting, in order to better prevent voter fraud, which they claimed was difficult to do with the constraints of same-day registration. Nutting further noted that Mainers would have still had 247 days a year to register to vote, other states have periods of up to 30 days they can't register before an election, and that thinking Mainers would not adjust to such a requirement was an insult to them. Some opponents of repeal also claimed same-day registration led to "lazy and uninformed people" voting. Opponents organized under the name Secure Maine's Ballot.

Supporters of repeal, led by Protect Maine Votes, stated claims by opponents of repeal about overworked municipal clerks were unsubstantiated, and that there was no evidence of a problem with voter fraud in Maine. They claimed that having same-day voter registration since 1973 is one reason for Maine's traditionally high rate of voter turnout, releasing studies to support their position, such as one that stated that the top five states in voter turnout all permitted same-day registration. They further claimed that the effort to pass the bill was an attempt to limit constituencies that traditionally vote Democratic from voting, such as college students.

Protect Maine Votes further noted that many Republican officials now opposed to same-day registration had made use of it in the past, including Governor LePage, two state senators, and eight state representatives. Protect Maine Votes spokesman David Farmer, in announcing that finding, noted that "The day and time you register is not an indicator of your interest in the election." They also noted that in 2010 roughly the same number of same-day registrants were Republicans as Democrats.

It was noted by outlets like the Bangor Daily News that, since the active People's Veto effort suspended the bill repealing it, Mainers could still register on Election Day to vote on the measure.

=== Notable endorsements ===
==== Supporters ====
- Phil Bartlett, Democratic State Senator (opposed the original bill)
- Shenna Bellows, Chair of the American Civil Liberties Union of Maine
- Ben Grant, Chairman of the Maine Democratic Party
- Bangor Daily News
- League of Women Voters Maine
- Maine AARP (opposed original bill)
- Maine Municipal Association
- Lewiston Sun Journal
- Portland Press Herald

==== Opponents ====
- Jon Courtney, Republican State Senator (supported the original bill)
- Paul LePage, Governor of Maine (signed the original bill)
- Robert Nutting, Speaker of the Maine House of Representatives
- Charlie Summers, Secretary of State of Maine (supported the original bill)
- Charlie Webster, Chairman of the Maine Republican Party

=== Polling ===
Date of opinion poll	Conducted by	Sample size	Yes	No	Undecided	Margin of Error
October 28–31, 2011	Public Policy Polling	673	48%	44%	7%	±3.8%
October 18–23, 2011	Critical Insights	600	51%	43%	6%	±4%
September 7, 2011	Pulse Opinion Research	500	53%	47%	-	±4.5%

== Results ==
Breakdown of voting by county
County	Yes	Votes	No	Votes
Androscoggin	54.6%	17,614	44.1%	14,229
Aroostook	56.8%	9,436	42.6%	7,076
Cumberland	63.1%	57,769	35.6%	32,582
Franklin	60.1%	5,333	39%	3,636
Hancock	62.2%	10,468	37.1%	6,250
Kennebec	60.1%	21,452	39%	13,914
Knox	65.8%	8,673	33.1%	4,362
Lincoln	59.5%	7,410	40.2%	4,999
Oxford	57.9%	10,120	41.3%	7,216
Penobscot	59.8%	24,586	39.4%	16,187
Piscataquis	54.6%	2,530	45%	2,084
Sagadahoc	60.1%	7,732	39.5%	5,078
Somerset	57%	7,396	42.1%	5,459
Waldo	62.5%	6,972	37.1%	4,140
Washington	55%	5,466	44.2%	4,387
York	58.6%	33,904	40.5%	23,442
Total	59.9%	237,027	39.2%	155,156
