= Eastern Argus =

Former newspaper in Portland, Maine

- Type: Daily newspaper
- Format: Broadsheet
- Founded: 1869
- Ceased publication: January 1922
- Headquarters: Portland, Maine, United States
- OCLC number: 2260559

The Eastern Argus was a newspaper published in Portland, Maine, United States, from 1803 to January 1921. In early 1921, it was succeeded by the Portland Press Herald.

== History ==
The newspaper was founded by Calvin Day and Nathaniel Willis. Its offices, along with the offices of all the newspapers in the city, were destroyed on July 4, 1866, in the Great Fire of 1866. At the time of its closure, it was the "oldest newspaper in Maine published continuously without change of name." Among those with a business interest in the paper at that time were Don Carlos Seitz and Ernest C. Bowler. It was owned by the Independent Publishing Company.

== Journalists ==
Prominent editors and journalists employed by the Eastern Argus included John Adams, Thomas Haskell and Seba Smith.

== Editorial positions ==
In 1803 "gentlemen of the Republican party" invited Nathaniel P. Willis, father of the journalist Nathaniel Parker Willis, to move from Boston to Portland to establish the Eastern Argus "in opposition to the Federalists." The paper was friendly to the French Revolution and opposed the Federalist Party. Later, it was friendly to the Democratic Party. It was strongly in favor of separation of Maine from Massachusetts and the formation of the U.S. state of Maine, which was accomplished in 1820.
