= Paraprofessional Healthcare Institute =

Paraprofessional Healthcare Institute, Inc.
- Abbreviation: PHI
- Formation: 1991; 35 years ago
- Type: Nonprofit
- Purpose: Improve long-term care for elders and individuals with disabilities
- Headquarters: New York City, United States
- Region served: United States
- President: Jodi M. Sturgeon
- Affiliations: Eldercare Workforce Alliance
- Staff: 25 (2010)
- Website: phinational.org

Paraprofessional Healthcare Institute (PHI) is an American non-profit organization based in New York City that works to improve long-term services and supports for elders and individuals with disabilities. In addition it works to improve the job quality of the direct-care workers who provide those services whether in people's homes or in nursing homes and other institutional facilities.

PHI also runs the National Direct Care Workforce Resource Center, an online library of over a thousand materials related to the direct-care workforce, and the State Index Tool, which helps policymakers, advocates, and other stakeholders understand how states support direct care workers, where they can improve, and how they compare to other states.

== History ==
Founded in 1991 and headquartered in New York, PHI has 25 staff members, and implements policy and practice initiatives across 26 states and nationally.

PHI has received state and national grants to run pilot training programs, which teach staff at long-term care organizations how to implement a "Coaching Approach" to communication, supervision, and problem-solving. As part of its “Health Care for Health Care Workers” campaign, PHI initiated a Come Care With Me program that paired policymakers with direct-care workers for a day on the job, so that they could learn firsthand about the day-to-day struggles associated with this workforce.

PHI supports revising the companionship exemption so that home care aides are no longer excluded from federal minimum wage and overtime protections. They have been opposed by many organizations which support the rights of people with disabilities such as ADAPT and Disabled In Action of Metropolitan New York which argue that revising the companionship exemption to require the payment of overtime rates for work performed beyond 40 hours a week will lead to reduced hours and take-home pay for home care workers and force many people with disabilities into nursing homes.

== Affiliates ==
PHI has a close association with three affiliates:

- Cooperative Home Care Associates (CHCA), a Bronx-based home care agency that employs 2,000 home health aides. CHCA is the largest worker cooperative in the country, managing an employer-based training program that enrolls 420 inner-city women annually.
- Home Care Associates (HCA), a worker-owned home care agency and training program with 170 staff, based in Philadelphia.
- Independence Care System (ICS), a nonprofit managed care program that coordinates services for more than 2,300 low-income adults living in their homes with physical disabilities.

PHI is also a member of the Eldercare Workforce Alliance, a group of 28 national organizations, joined together to address the immediate and future workforce crisis in caring for an aging America.
