= 2017 Maine Question 1 =

Referendum on allowing casinos in York County

Question 1: Citizen Initiative
- An Act To Allow Slot Machines or a Casino in York County

Results
Choice	Votes	%
Yes	57,280	16.72%
No	285,372	83.28%
Valid votes	342,652	100.00%
Invalid or blank votes	0	0.00%
Total votes	342,652	100.00%
No
90-100%
80-90%
70-80%

Maine Question 1, formally An Act To Allow Slot Machines or a Casino in York County, was a citizen-initiated referendum question that appeared on the November 7, 2017, statewide ballot in Maine. It sought to award a license for the construction and operation of a casino in York County, Maine by a qualified entity as spelled out in the proposed law, with tax revenue generated by the casino to go to specific programs. The wording of the proposed law effectively permitted only one company, Capital 7, to be awarded the license. The ballot measure was defeated, with 83% of voters opposing it.

The effort to put the question on the ballot generated controversy due to how the petition drive and campaign for the casino were funded and conducted, as well as the fact that the casino would have effectively not been given out by a competitive process. The campaign committees supporting the question had record fines levied against them from authorities related to violations of Maine campaign finance law.

== Background ==
An initial effort to place a referendum for a York County casino on the ballot for November 2016 failed after Maine Secretary of State Matthew Dunlap announced on March 2, 2016 that only 36,000 of the 91,000 signatures turned in were valid, when roughly 61,000 were required. 36,000 signatures were rejected because the signature of the petition circulators on the petitions did not match the signature on file. 19,000 more were invalidated because they did not belong to registered voters. Horseracing Jobs Fairness, the group supporting the proposal, sued Dunlap to get the signatures reinstated, but the suit was rejected.

The signature gathering effort was criticized by several state and local officials for alleged misleading claims by signature gatherers, such as one in Bangor telling potential signers that it would "help uplift the spirits of the people of Bangor" when York County is over 120 miles from Bangor. Dunlap's office received several complaints about false claims by petition gatherers, but said there was nothing they could do as false claims are constitutionally protected free speech, and that it was the responsibility of the signer to ask about the proposal.

Those collecting signatures in the 2016 effort were offered $10 a signature, compared to a 2014 effort to ban bear baiting while hunting, which offered $2 a signature.

Horseracing Jobs Fairness then resumed gathering signatures and submitted 65,000 more in December 2016, with Dunlap validating 53,000 of them on January 23, 2017, which when combined with previously validated signatures was enough to place the question on the November 2017 ballot.

Dunlap announced the final wording of the question that will appear on the ballot on September 7, 2017. It will read, "Do you want to allow a certain company to operate table games and/or slot machines in York County, subject to state and local approval, with part of the profits going to the specific programs described in the initiative?".

The proposal was criticized for limiting applicants for the license to "an entity that owned in 2003 at least 51 percent of an entity licensed to operate a commercial track in Penobscot County". The only entity that meets that criterion is Capital 7, which is largely owned by developer Shawn Scott. Though the company must be given the license, it can be sold after it is obtained. Shawn Scott did this in 2003 after convincing Maine voters to authorize the opening of the Hollywood Casino Bangor, selling it to Penn National Gaming.

Until April 2017, Shawn's sister Lisa Scott appeared as the sole funder of the campaign. After the Maine Ethics Commission began an investigation of the campaign, Lisa revealed that most of the money comes from both domestic and offshore investment firms connected to Shawn. The investigation revealed that $4 million was spent just to get the question on the ballot. Lisa stepped down from the campaign at the end of August 2017, stating that she did not want to be a distraction from the campaign.

=== Ethics commission fines ===
On November 3, 2017, the Maine Commission on Governmental Ethics and Election Practices voted in a series of 4-1 votes to levy fines totaling $500,000 against the four ballot question committees involved in the campaign for Question 1. The fines were related to violations of Maine's campaign finance disclosure laws from those committees and Lisa Scott, being what the commission called a pattern of evasion in disclosing who was funding the campaign. One commissioner said that there seemed to have been an effort to conceal the involvement of Shawn Scott in the funding of the campaign. The amount of the fines was a record for the commission, being almost 10 times that of the previous record, though it was not the maximum permitted by law. Members of the commission who voted for the high fines said that believed a law passed by voters in 2015 required the steeper fines, and they wished to send a message that the public has a right to know where money for campaigns comes from. The one commissioner who voted against the fines, Bradford Pattenshall, stated that the felt the high fines were "grossly disproportionate" to the offenses and did not see the violations as nefarious. Lawyers representing Lisa Scott and the campaign committees have said the fines were excessive and that the Commission had "put its thumb on the scale" for the upcoming vote. They pledged to appeal the fines in court.

The Commission also voted 5-0 that a campaign committee led by Shawn Scott was only a donor to the other committees, and as such did not need to register as a political action committee. A spokesperson for Shawn, former Maine Attorney General Andrew Ketterer, said that Shawn had been "vindicated" and that the ruling was proof he had complied with the spirit and letter of the law.

== Campaign ==
By September 15, 2017, no formal opposition to the proposal had emerged, and no television advertising had been purchased in Maine's media markets regarding the question. Supporters released a TV ad on September 27. Opponents, organizing under the name A Bad Deal for Maine PAC, launched a website the week of October 7. Supporters have spent $1.55 million on their campaign, as well as incurring $1 million in debt, according to their October 5 campaign finance report. The only contribution listed on the October 5th finance report of opponents was $30,000 on a poll funded by Churchill Downs Incorporated, which owns the Oxford Casino in Oxford County.

Shawn Scott began to take a higher profile as the election approached, appearing in advertisements, holding news conferences, and representing the campaign at debates.

=== Endorsements ===
==== Supporters ====
- Andrew Ketterer, former Maine Attorney General
- Aroostook Band of Micmac
- Lance Harvell, State representative (R-Farmington)
- Tom Saviello, State senator (R-Wilton)

==== Opponents ====
- Paul LePage, Governor of Maine
- Bangor Daily News
- MaineToday Media newspapers; Portland Press Herald, Kennebec Journal, Morning Sentinel

== Result ==
The Associated Press called the referendum at about 9 P.M. on election night for the no side. With 70 percent of precincts reporting, the no side had about 84% of the vote.
