= Thomas Haskell (journalist) =

American journalist

Thomas L. Haskell (1842 - September 30, 1928) was an American journalist from Maine. He was noted for his seventy years of marine news coverage in the shipping town of Portland, Maine. Haskell was "known to seafaring men the world over as 'Cap'n' Haskell," according to the New York Times.

== Journalism career ==
Haskell worked covering marine news for Portland, Maine's the Eastern Argus newspaper from 1857 to 1920. In that year, he joined the Portland Press. He continued with the newspaper when the Argus and Press merged to form the Portland Press Herald and continued working until 3 months prior to his death in 1928.

When the New York Times ran Haskell's obituary, the newspaper said he covered "full-rigged ships, which brought molasses and rum from Barbados" when he started his journalism career. At the close of his career, Haskell covered "transatlantic steamships."

In 1924, the Portland local of the International Typographical Union called him the "dean of active American newspaper reporters." He served for 24 years as treasurer of the city's branch of the ITU.

== Biography ==
Haskell was married and had four sons and a daughter. In 1924, he owned the house at 774 Forest Avenue in Portland.
