= Norda =

Wooden sailing ship

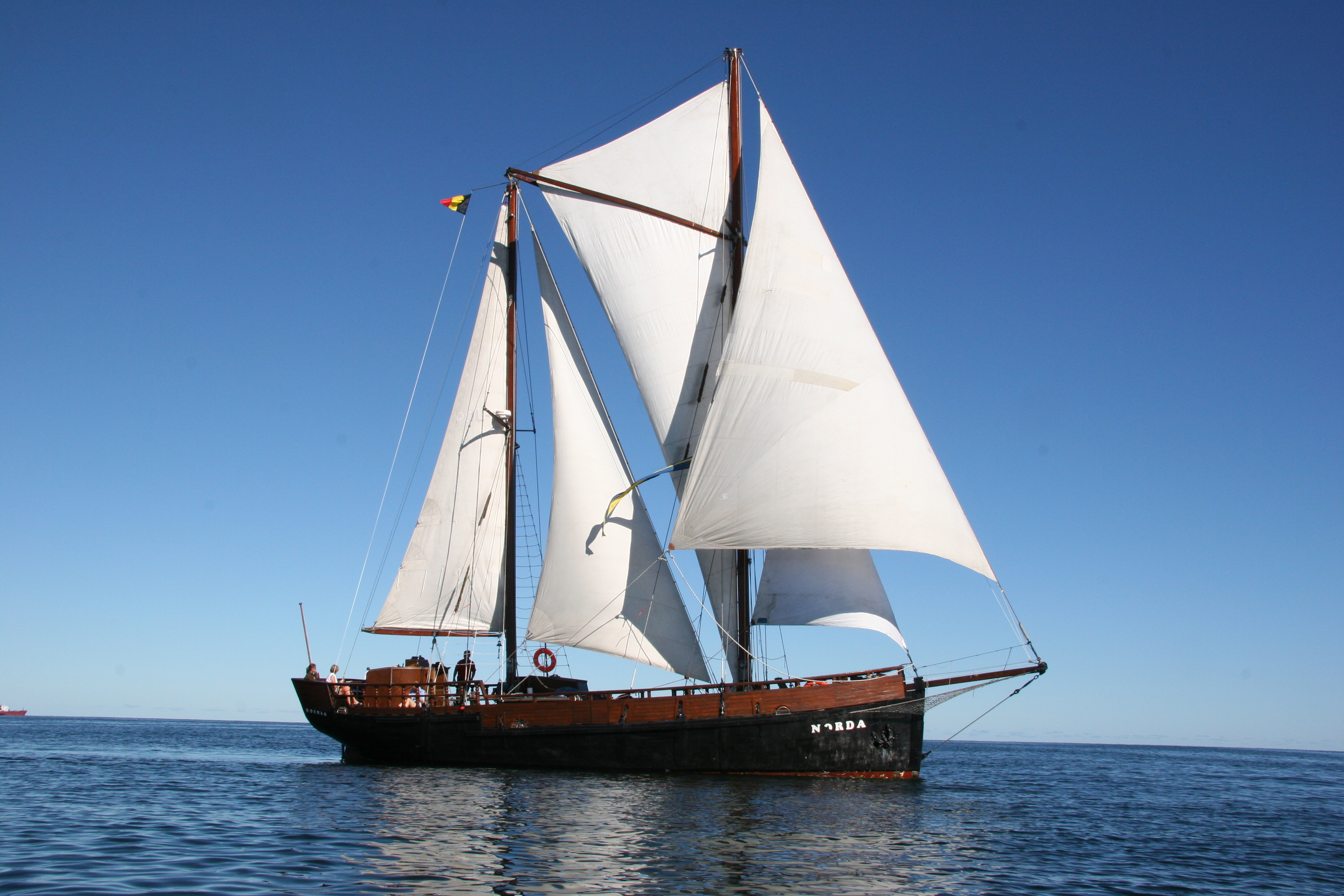
- Norda

History

Poland
- Name: Norda
- Owner: G.Weston & A.Graf
- Ordered: 1928
- Builder: K. Frederiksunde, Denmark
- Laid down: 1928
- Launched: 1929
- Christened: Ewa
- Commissioned: MIR (Polish Fishery Institute)
- Renamed: Putzig 2, Wla-17, Zag-9, Norda
- Refit: 1985-1995-2015
- Home port: Gdynia, Poland
- Status: active

General characteristics
- Type: Wishbone ketch
- Displacement: 45 tons
- Length: 20.5 m (67 ft)
- Beam: 5.43 m (17.8 ft)
- Draft: 2.85 m (9.4 ft)
- Decks: 1
- Propulsion: sail, 160 hp diesel
- Sail plan: wishbone ketch
- Crew: 2 to 40
- Notes: Sail area: 170 m²

Norda is a wooden sailing vessel that was commissioned in 1928, originally used as a research vessel in Poland. It served as research vessel, fishing vessel and is now a yacht.

== History ==
=== Research vessel ===
The vessel was commissioned in 1928 by MIR (Polish Fishing Institute). It was built in 1928 to order of in the Andersen Shipyard in Frederikssunde, Denmark. It was christened Ewa, inspired by the names of daughters of both Professor Michał Siedlecki and Dr Franciszek Lubecki, two distinguished scientists and maritime researches pioneers.

MIR owned another vessel that was almost the same: a few months earlier they acquired another cutter Starnia, which was also used for finding new fishing grounds and fisherman’s training. Both vessels played an important role in the development of the sea fishery industry in Poland.

The classical hull of the cutter, with straight bow and spoon shaped stern, was built from oak. The ship was built as a sailing vessel with an auxiliary motor. The propulsion system was composed of a two-cylinder Tuxham engine of 64-76 hp and ketch rigged gaff sails. The GRT was 29 ton and the NRT was 10 ton. The total area of the four sails was 160 m2. Under deck there was space for a crew of five, four scientists and laboratory. When already in use as research vessel, a wheel house was built on the aft deck.

The cutter was commanded by Jan Lemke until 1936. In that time Ewa sailed the Baltic and was used for research expeditions organized by scientists form MIR, The Department of Economy and Organization of Fishery in Bydgoszcz, The Sea Fishery Laboratory form Hel and departments of the Scientists Laboratory of Farming from Puławy. In 1932 those institutions were united in the maritime base in Hel, which was also the home harbour or Norda at that time. Those expeditions contributed to recognition of fishing grounds at the Baltic Sea and development of polish sea biology and ichthyology.

After six years of intensive exploitation Ewa had to be renovated. In 1939, during inspection at the Fishery Shipyard in Gdynia, it was ascertained that the hull had been seriously damaged (rotten) and the cutter was qualified to be destroyed. At that time Antoni Budzisz from Gdynia became interested in her. He bought the cutter from MIR and adapted her as a fishing boat. Ewa was being overhauled and the damaged parts of the hull were exchanged.

=== The German occupation during World War II ===
The overhaul was unfortunately interrupted by the Second World War, but later it continued and it was finally completed in 1942. The overhaul was done in such way that the masts were cut and a more powerful motor was the only power source.

The cutter, at that time named Putzig 2, was used as fishing boat with the base port in Władysławowo. Leon Budzisz was her captain. Leon was a cousin of Antoni Budzisz, who died during the war.

According to Mr Jerzy Budzisz, son of Leon Budzisz, the vessel was called Anne Marie between 1941 and 1945.

On March 3, 1945 the cutter was confiscated and used by a group of Germans to escape from Hel to Köln. The around 100 persons that escaped with Putzig-2 were mainly soldiers and postmen.

=== The swan-dance in Communist Poland ===
In 1946, she was traced down and brought back Gdynia. The General Sea Fishery Inspectorate assigned former Ewa to The Community “Rybak”, and she was renamed to Wła – 17. Leon Budzisz became once more her captain. After Community was closed down this same Leon Budzisz bought the cutter, and used it as a fishing boat till 1955 when he had to sell her due to financial problems. The cutter was bought by The Community “Gryf”. In 1958 the next overhaul had to be made. At that time the cutter was already deprived of sailing equipment and the spoon shaped overhang on the stern. Till half of the 1980s the boat, renamed to Zag-9, was being exploited by two individual ship-owners. The base port was Gdańsk, Górki Zachodnie. Later they decided that it was not worth it to make another repair of the hull.

=== Rebirth and new life ===
On July 1, 1986 the old cutter was bought from the fishermen Zygmunt Krukowski and Krzystof Klarwacki by Stanislaw Konopka. Later he would start the rebuild together with Grzegorz Wozniak, who is geographer by the profession and sailor by passion and the owner of tourist office “Nord”. The price was 15'000 old Polish Zloty; this is now (due to the high inflation that followed) about the price of one bread. The new ship-owner decided to rebuild the cutter as a sailing yacht so the boat was towed to Puck, where it was put out of the water and moved to the fishing harbor. In 1986 the hull and the used-out motor were dismantled. From the original vessel only the backbone, ribs and planks from underwater part were left. After that the hull was rebuilt in a slightly changed shape. The boards were made two planks higher along the side of the hull and four planks higher at the stern. Under the wooden backbone (keel) a six meter long, a I-shaped steel ballast beam was fixed. In 1990 the newly rebuilt hull was transported to Jastarnia were the reconstruction of the yacht was meant to be finished. Unfortunately the construction company did not fulfill the contract. The hull was this time transported to Gdynia and placed on the embankment of Yacht Club “Stal” from which the shipowner was a member. The last stage of the reconstruction lasted until October 1994. The interior was finished by boat builder Leszek Fryzkowski supported by the ship owner Grzegorz Woźniak.

The sailing plan has been designed by Jan Młynarczyk and consists of two glued spruce masts – 19.5 m main mast with wishbone boom and 17.5 bezan mast, and five sails with total area of 160 sq m . The masts were made by the boat builder Franciszek Lewiński. Under the deck there are a technical forecastle (with chain locker, diesel and storage), three berths for 3 persons, heads, a shower/wet gear room, a quite a big saloon with, a galley, a navigation cabin, an engine room and 3 berths for the crew. The yacht is equipped 110 hp Delfin motor built in 1978.

The nine-year effort resulted in a two-masted, classical yacht, which was named Norda (the word for the onerous, north winds in the local Kaszubian language). The length of the ketch including bowsprit was then 19.5 m. The vessels gained her first certificate still as Zag-9. On March 3, 1987 the newly rebuild yacht got its name Norda.

In 1995, Grzegorz Wozniak became the sole owner of the yacht, and in 2002 he changed the registration to motorsailer, as this had less strict regulations for the crew compared to a sailing vessel. The safety card of 2004, mentions only one owner: Grzegorz Woźniak, and another home harbour: Gdynia.

Norda was sold on December 31, 2004 to Philippe De Brouwer. who continued to restore Norda with original pieces: equipped both the mast-foots with pinrails, added some antique details to the interior, and even installed central heating and a woodstove. Smaller changes and repairs also resulted in a longer bowsprit. The LOA is now 20.5m, and Norda is again sailing the Baltic Sea, visiting many of the places where it sailed about 80 years ago and that it did not visit ever since.

=== Today and future ===
At the end of 2014, G.Weston and A.Graf, co-founders of WestOnBoats, became Norda's owners.

== Construction ==
Norda is a wooden sailing cutter built in Denmark in 1928. It is a construction with double ribs, and with 2 inch molded wooden planks on the outside. The complete hull structure, the underwater planking as well as part of the deck constructions are still original. Only a steel keel is added under the wooden keel, to provide more counterweight in order to add higher masts and more sail. Its sail plan is wishbone ketch.

- construction year: 1928
- shipwarf: Anderson, Frederikssunde (Denmark)
- GT: 46,40 ton
- NT: 13.92 ton
- LOA: 19,49 m
- width: 5,43 m
- minimal freeboard 0,70m
- draught: 2,85 m
- motor: PZM Puck (Delfin), UE 680/193, 121 kW, at 2200tpm, 6 cylinders, construction year 1979
- sail area: 170 sq m
- crew: 2 to 30
- maximal number of passengers on deck: 40
- number of berths: 2+3+3+4+1 = 13
- number of masts: 2
- number of sails: 5
- comfort: 2 heads, 1 shower, 1 gas-cooker with 4 burners, central heating and wood stove, hot and cold water

== Art ==
- Norda inspired the famous artist Henri Seroka to compose a CD of relaxing music
- Wieslaw Wilk painted Norda (painting entitled Norda)
- Norda was the location of two editions of the TV serial Święta wojna, with main artist Krzysztof Hanke.

== See also ==
=== More information ===
- Official website: http://www.westonboats.com
- Tall ship's fan: http://www.tallship-fan.de/index_e.htm
- The daily Dziennik Baltycki, December 9, 1994 has also a good description of the history of Norda.

=== Other mentionings on the web ===
- in the Zlot Old Timerow: http://www.zlotoldtimerow.pl/pages/_MKK3111.htm
- on the website of the daily Gazeta: http://www.sport.pl/sport/1,78990,5657507,Norda_swietowala_w_Gdansku.html
- in blogs:
  - http://kulinski.gdanskmarinecenter.com/art.php?id=826&fload=1
  - http://facetmorski.bloog.pl/id,2622250,index.html#form
