= Paul C. Paquet =

Canadian biologist

- Born: Paul Charles Francis Xavier Paquet; 6 December 1948 (age 77); Portland, Oregon, USA
- Citizenship: American, Canadian
- Education: PhD
- Alma mater: Santa Clara University
- Occupation: Biologist
- Writing career
- Language: English

Paul C. Paquet is an American and Canadian biologist who is best known for his ecological and behavioral research on large carnivores, especially regarding wolves and bears. He has graduate degrees in philosophy, wildlife behavior and conservation, biology, and a PhD in zoology from University of Alberta. His research focuses on the interface between ecological theory and conservation. He is an internationally recognized authority on mammalian carnivores; including their ecology, behaviour, and management. He has spent more than 40 years covering subjects ranging from the worldwide decline of large carnivores to the philosophical relationship of animal welfare and conservation, publishing more than 200 scholarly articles and several books addressing issues of ecology, conservation and environmental ethics. He is a graduate of Santa Clara University. Paquet is an educator and member of numerous government, industry, and advisory committees of organizations such as the International Union for Conservation of Nature, U.S. Fish and Wildlife Service, the Canadian Wildlife Service, WWF International, and the European Union.
