= 2014 Maine Question 1 =

Question 1: Citizen Initiative
- An Act To Prohibit the Use of Dogs, Bait or Traps When Hunting Bears Except under Certain Circumstances

Results
| Choice | Votes | % |
|---|---|---|
| Yes | 279,617 | 46.56% |
| No | 320,873 | 53.44% |
| Valid votes | 600,490 | 97.99% |
| Invalid or blank votes | 12,331 | 2.01% |
| Total votes | 612,821 | 100.00% |
No
70-80%
60-70%
50-60%
Yes
50-60%

Maine Question 1 (MQ1), "An Act To Prohibit the Use of Dogs, Bait or Traps When Hunting Bears Except under Certain Circumstances", was a citizen-initiated referendum measure in Maine, which was voted on in the general election of November 4, 2014. As the Maine Legislature declined to act on the proposed statute, it was automatically placed on the ballot. The proposal was defeated by 320,873 "No" votes to 279,617 "Yes".

== Background ==
In 2013, the Humane Society of the United States (HSUS) decided to push for a restrictions on bear hunting in Maine. Maine voters previously rejected a ban on using traps, bait, and dogs to hunt bears on 2 November 2004, with 389,455 opposed and 344,322 in favor.

With support from HSUS, some Maine residents formed Mainers for Fair Bear Hunting (MFBH). On 9 July 2013, MFBH began collecting 80,000 signatures to place the question on the November 2014 ballot. 57,277 signatures were required to do so. MFBH submitted the signatures on 3 February 2014. On 5 March, Maine Secretary of State Matthew Dunlap certified 63,626 valid signatures. Under Maine law, MQ1 was then submitted to the Maine Legislature for action as LD 1845 IB 1. On 25 March, the legislature indefinitely postponed action on MQ 5, thereby sending it to the voters.

Secretary Dunlap released the final wording of the question on 25 June. It was "Do you want to ban bear hunting using bait, traps or dogs except to protect property, public safety or for research?" As the only citizen referendum to reach the ballot, it was designated Question 1 per Maine law.

== Campaign ==
Opponents of the petition gathering effort announced the formation of Save Maine's Bear Hunt (SMBH) on September 23, 2013. SMBH had the support of the three major candidates for governor in 2014, and of 80 state legislators and 20 organizations. SMBH characterized the referendum as a vote on how to manage wildlife in Maine, and not on hunting methods, believing that wildlife professionals know best how to manage the bear population. They further criticized the intervention of HSUS in a local matter.

MFBH stated their goal was to end what they call "cruel and unsportsmanlike" practices, which they claimed were not necessary to control the bear population in Maine. They also claimed the previous referendum effort failed due to "scare tactics" and misinformation.

MFBH was almost entirely funded by HSUS. From 28 May to 15 July, HSUS gave $780,000 to MFBH. In the same period, SMBH and other opponents raised about $250,000. HSUS president Wayne Pacelle personally canvassed homes in Portland on August 10, and in Bangor on September 13.

The Maine Department of Inland Fisheries and Wildlife (DIF&W) and DIF&W Commissioner Chandler Woodcock officially opposed MQ1. MFBH sued DIF&W on September 30, demanding that DIF&W comply with MFBH's Freedom of Access Act requests, cease campaigning against Question 1, and repay state funds used for campaign activities. MFBH stated "We do respect the agency's right to provide factual information to voters, but they've repeatedly gone above and beyond that, and it's time for that to stop." Commissioner Woodcock called the lawsuit politically motivated and meant to "generate headlines". MFBH asked for an emergency injunction to stop DFI&W's campaigning.

In response, DIF&W announced on October 17 that it would stop using state funds to oppose the referendum, while maintaining that its actions were lawful.

Maine Superior Court Judge Joyce Wheeler denied the request for the injunction on October 22, stating that "The public interest would be adversely affected if plaintiffs' request for a temporary restraining order were granted when DIF&W's speech is on topics squarely within 'its competence as governor'" of Legislative directives. The Maine Attorney General's office called the ruling a victory for free speech, while MFBH said "Our government shouldn't be telling us how to vote."

After the failure of the referendum, it was speculated that its presence on the ballot aided Paul LePage's reelection as Governor, as it brought out voters also amenable to supporting LePage.

=== Polling ===
| Date of opinion poll | Conducted by | Sample size (likely voters) | Yes | No | Undecided | Margin of Error |
|---|---|---|---|---|---|---|
| October 23–29, 2014 | Bangor Daily News/Ipsos | 488 | 45% | 49% | 6% | ±5.1% |
| October 15–21, 2014 | University of New Hampshire | 667 | 36% | 57% | 7% | ±3.8% |
| October 6–12, 2014 | Bangor Daily News/Ipsos | 540 | 43% | 49% | 7% | ±4.8% |
| September 18–25, 2014 | University of New Hampshire | 441 | 41% | 53% | 6% | ±4.4% |
| June 12–18, 2014 | University of New Hampshire | 441 | 48% | 44% | 8% | ±4.4% |

=== Notable endorsements ===
==== Supporters ====
- American Society for the Prevention of Cruelty to Animals
- Humane Society of the United States
- International Fund for Animal Welfare
- People for the Ethical Treatment of Animals
- State Representative Alan Casavant (D-Biddeford), Mayor of Biddeford
- State Representative Ben Chipman (I-Portland)
- State Representative Denise Harlow (D-Portland)
- Kesha, musician
- Bernd Heinrich, naturalist, author, University of Vermont biology professor
- Bill Maher, comedian, TV host
- Paul C. Paquet, wildlife research biologist, University of Victoria professor
- Steve Woods, chairman of the Yarmouth Town Council, former U.S. Senate candidate
- Biddeford Journal Tribune
- Brunswick Times-Record
- Portsmouth, New Hampshire Herald

==== Opponents ====
- Angus King, Independent U.S. senator and former governor.
- AFL-CIO of Maine
- National Rifle Association of America
- Sportsman's Alliance of Maine
- Shenna Bellows, 2014 Democratic U.S. Senate candidate
- State Senator Emily Cain (D-Penobscot), candidate for U.S Representative
- Eliot Cutler, candidate for governor
- Paul LePage, Governor of Maine
- Kris MacCabe, Maine Game Warden, cast member of North Woods Law TV show
- U.S. Representative Mike Michaud, candidate for governor
- Ted Nugent, musician
- Bruce Poliquin, former state treasurer of Maine, candidate for U.S Representative
- Chandler Woodcock, Maine Department of Inland Fisheries and Wildlife Commissioner, former state senator
- Bangor Daily News
- MaineToday Media newspapers: Portland Press Herald, Kennebec Journal, Morning Sentinel

==== Declined to endorse ====
- U.S. Senator Susan Collins
