= Zawisza Czerwony =

Polish medieval nobleman and knight

Zawisza Czerwony aka Zawisza Oleśnicki (died 1433; "Zawisza the Red" a.k.a. "Zawisza of Oleśnica") was a Polish medieval nobleman and knight, courtier to Queen Jadwiga and member of the Kingdom of Poland's royal administration.

A lower judge at Sandomierz, for his services to Queen Jadwiga he was awarded a large estate in Sącz, which he sold to the town council for the establishment of a hospital. Jan Długosz, in his famous chronicle, repeats the anecdote about how Queen Jadwiga sent Zawisza the Red to observe the appearance of her husband, 31 years older than the Queen, to be and report his observations to her. Władysław Jagiełło, being very astute, quickly found out about the nature of this visit and invited the queen's courtier to the bath where he could observe the future king-consort in his full glory. The report given by Zawisza to his queen was favorable.

Zawisza the Red was of Dębno coat of arms.
