= 2015 Maine Question 1 =

Question 1: Citizen Initiative
- An Act To Strengthen the Maine Clean Election Act, Improve Disclosure and Make Other Changes to the Campaign Finance Laws

Results
Choice	Votes	%
Yes	119,912	54.94%
No	98,343	45.06%
Valid votes	218,255	98.83%
Invalid or blank votes	2,579	1.17%
Total votes	220,834	100.00%
Yes
60–70%
50–60%
No
50–60%

Maine Question 1, "An Act To Strengthen the Maine Clean Election Act, Improve Disclosure and Make Other Changes to the Campaign Finance Laws", was a citizen-initiated referendum measure in Maine, which appeared on the November 3, 2015 statewide ballot. As the Maine Legislature did not exercise its ability to pass the bill on its own, it was placed on the ballot and approved by Maine voters.

== Background ==
The Maine Clean Elections Act was passed as a citizen-initiated referendum titled Question 3 in 1996, making Maine the first state to adopt a public campaign financing law. It established a voluntary public campaign financing program for Maine gubernatorial and legislative elections, allowing candidates who demonstrated a certain level of community support through a limited number of 'seed money' contributions to qualify for public financing of their campaign. Candidates who accepted such financing could not subsequently accept any private contributions to their campaign.

Initially, the Act also provided for publicly financed candidates to receive additional matching funds should privately financed candidates in their race outspend them. In 2011, the United States Supreme Court struck down a similar provision in Arizona as unconstitutional, which led to a US District Court judge doing the same with Maine's provision later that year. Due to those court rulings, the Maine Legislature removed the matching funds provision from the Act.

The group Mainers for Accountable Elections turned in approximately 86,000 signatures to Maine Secretary of State Matthew Dunlap on January 21, 2015. Dunlap verified about 80,000 of them by February 18, 2015. That was about 16,000 more than required, which sent the question to the Legislature for consideration, though they did not do so and the question was sent to the ballot.

Republican State Senator Eric Brakey introduced a competing measure in the Legislature to ask voters to repeal the Act and redirect the intended funds to education costs. His proposal was rejected in committee on May 6, 2015 by a 9-1 vote.

The proposed changes to the Act include increasing the amount of money distributed to candidates, more disclosure requirements such as listing the top three donors that pay for political advertisements in the ad itself, and increased fines for violators.

== Campaign ==
Mainers for Accountable Elections launched its campaign on July 28, 2015, at a rally where Republican State Sen. Roger Katz spoke in support of the referendum.

Until September 2015, there was no organized opposition to the referendum. On September 23, it was reported a Facebook page was created called "No on Question 1". It was created in part by State Rep. Joel Stetkis (R-Canaan) who appeared on WVOM radio to call the proposal "nothing but a scam" and "an assault on the Maine people who want a citizen legislator to represent them."

Opponents of the Act as a whole include Governor of Maine Paul LePage who has attempted to remove funding for the Act from the state budget, calling it "welfare for politicians", without success as well as the aforementioned Sen. Brakey's effort to seek repeal of the law. The conservative Maine Heritage Policy Center supported court rulings against the Act. LePage has called Question 1 specifically a "scam" and that public campaign financing was like "giving your wife your checkbook".

On October 21, the Maine State Chamber of Commerce announced its opposition to the Question, due to disagreeing with its funding mechanism of eliminating corporate tax breaks. Chamber President Dana Connors stated that Maine's business incentive programs are modest and it would be difficult and harm the state's business climate to eliminate any of them. The opposition was notable it that it was not based on ideological opposition to public financing of campaigns as with other opponents.

=== Notable supporters ===
- Shenna Bellows, Democratic nominee for the U.S. Senate in 2014, former head of the American Civil Liberties Union of Maine
- Chris Johnson, Democratic State Senator
- Roger Katz, Republican State Senator
- Angus King, U.S. Senator and former Governor of Maine
- George Mitchell, former U.S. Senate Majority Leader
- George Smith, former executive director of the Sportsman's Alliance of Maine, TV host
- Groups affiliated with Mainers for Accountable Elections
  - American Civil Liberties Union of Maine
  - Maine Center for Economic Policy
  - Sierra Club Maine
  - Environment Maine
- Bangor Daily News
- MaineToday Media newspapers; Portland Press Herald, Kennebec Journal, Morning Sentinel
- Maine Small Business Coalition

=== Notable opponents ===
- John Baldacci, former Governor of Maine, former U.S. Representative
- Kenneth Fredette, Minority Leader of the Maine House of Representatives (R-Newport)
- Paul LePage, Governor of Maine
- Larry Lockman, State Representative (R-Amherst)
- Joel Stetkis, State Representative (R-Canaan)
- Michael Thibodeau, President of the Maine Senate
- Maine State Chamber of Commerce

== Results ==
Breakdown of voting by county
County	Yes	Votes	No	Votes
Androscoggin	49.55%	9,409	50.44%	9,578
Aroostook	48.61%	4,469	51.38%	4,724
Cumberland	63.88%	36,290	36.11%	20,514
Franklin	48.08%	2,037	51.91%	2,199
Hancock	57.82%	6,426	42.17%	4,687
Kennebec	52.82%	8,967	47.17%	8,007
Knox	59.49%	4,263	40.5%	2,902
Lincoln	54.64%	3,549	45.35%	2,946
Oxford	46.24%	3,341	53.75%	3,883
Penobscot	46.9%	10,202	53.09%	11,550
Piscataquis	40.1%	1,116	59.89%	1,667
Sagadahoc	55.85%	3,713	44.14%	2,934
Somerset	41.63%	2,809	58.36%	3,937
Waldo	55.24%	3,868	44.75%	3,134
Washington	43.24%	2,032	56.75%	2,667
York	57.16%	17,333	42.83%	12,988
Total	54.94%	119,912	45.06%	98,343
