= 2014 Massachusetts Question 1 =

Question 1
- Massachusetts Automatic Gas Tax Increase Repeal Initiative

Results
Choice	Votes	%
Yes	1,095,229	52.97%
No	972,271	47.03%
Valid votes	2,067,500	100.00%
Invalid or blank votes	0	0.00%
Total votes	2,067,500	100.00%

Yes
70–80%
60–70%
50–60%
No
90–100%
80–90%
70–80%
60–70%
50–60%
Other
Tie

The Massachusetts Automatic Gas Tax Increase Repeal Initiative, Question 1 was on the November 4, 2014 statewide ballot. Approved by voters, the measure repeals a 2013 law that would automatically adjust gas taxes according to inflation, allowing for automatic annual increases in the state's gas tax.

The law that this initiative repeals would also have put a minimum cap on gas taxes to prevent gas tax decreases in the case of deflation. The tax increase was part of a transportation funding package that was vetoed by Governor Deval Patrick (D) because he wanted an even greater tax increase. Patrick's veto was overruled by a House vote of 123 to 33 and a Senate vote of 35 to 5.

Tank the Gas Tax, an organization supporting the initiative, stated that they collected at least 18,500 signatures by June 9, 2014. They turned in the signatures on June 18, 2014 in an attempt to qualify the initiative for the ballot. The measure was certified for the 2014 ballot on July 2, 2014.

The question passed with 53% of voters in favor.

== Background ==
=== State gas tax ===
In 2013, the Democratic-controlled state legislature passed House Bill 3847, which raised the state's gas tax from 21 to 24 cents per gallon and automatically tied the tax rate to inflation for future years, meaning it would increase by the same annual percentage as the Consumer Price Index (CPI). This marked the first increase in the tax since 1991. Given that the CPI has averaged approximately one or two percent during the past several years, the tax would likely increase by half a penny or less per year.

== Support ==
The measure is sponsored by the group Tank the Gas Tax.

=== Supporters ===
==== Officials ====
- State Rep. Geoff Diehl (R-7)
- State Rep. Kevin Kuros (R-8)
- State Rep. Ryan Fattman (R-18)
- State Rep. Shaunna O'Connell (R-3)
- State Rep. Jim Lyons (R-18)

==== Individuals ====
- Jeffrey T. Kuhner, President of the Edmund Burke Institute for American Renewal
- Bill Vernon, Director and National Federation of Independent Business Massachusetts

=== Arguments ===
- Tank the Gas Tax deemed the tax a slippery slope.

=== Campaign contributions ===
Total campaign cash as of October 30, 2014
Support	$94,318
Opposition	$1,884,722

As of October 30, 2014, one campaign organization had received an aggregate total of $94,318 in contributions.

PAC info:

PAC/Ballot measure group	Amount raised	Amount spent
Committee to Tank the Automatic Gas Tax Hikes	$94,318	$75,173
Total	$94,318	$75,173

Top contributors:

A1 Auto	$10,000
Liberty Initiative Fund	$5,000
Strong Economy for Growth	$5,000
Strong Economy Massachusetts Independent Expenditures PAC	$5,000
Massachusetts Ambulance Association	$2,500

== Opposition ==
The official opposition campaign is called Vote No on Question One, in conjunction with the Committee for Safer Roads and Bridges.

=== Opponents ===
- Governor Deval Patrick (D)
- Medford Mayor Michael J. McGlynn
- Committee for Safer Roads and Bridges
- Kristina Egan, Director of Transportation for Massachusetts

=== Campaign contributions ===
As of October 30, 2014, one campaign organization had received an aggregate total of $1,884,722 in contributions.

PAC info:

PAC/Ballot measure group	Amount raised	Amount spent
NO on One Committee	$1,884,722	$438,200
Total	$1,884,722	$438,200

Top contributors:

CIM Advancement Fund	$200,000
American Council of Engineering Companies of Massachusetts	$145,000
Mass Aggregate & Asphalt Pavement Association	$100,000
Suffolk Construction Company, Inc.	$100,000
Utility Contractors Association of New England Inc.	$100,000
Flagship Associates LLC	$90,000

== Media editorial positions ==
=== Support ===
- The Worcester Telegram & Gazette recommended a "yes" vote.

=== Opposition ===
- The Boston Globe advocated a "no" vote.
