= 2020 Virginia Question 1 =

Question 1
- November 3, 2020
- Should the Constitution of Virginia be amended to establish a redistricting commission, consisting of eight members of the General Assembly and eight citizens of the Commonwealth, that is responsible for drawing the congressional and state legislative districts that will be subsequently voted on, but not changed by, the General Assembly and enacted without the Governor's involvement and to give the responsibility of drawing districts to the Supreme Court of Virginia if the redistricting commission fails to draw districts or the General Assembly fails to enact districts by certain deadlines?

Results
Choice	Votes	%
Yes	2,770,704	65.69%
No	1,447,390	34.31%
Total votes	4,218,094	100.00%
Registered voters/turnout	5,975,752	70.59%

Yes
90–100%
80–90%
70–80%
60–70%
50–60%
No
60–70%
50–60%
Other
Tie
No votes

The 2020 Virginia Question 1, also known as the Virginia Redistricting Commission Amendment, was a proposed amendment to the Virginia Constitution to establish a political commission in order to draw the districts of the U.S House of Representatives seats in Virginia, as well as the districts of the Virginia House of Delegates and State Senate. The amendment was on the November 3 ballot. According to a Christopher Newport University poll over 70% of Virginians support redistricting reform. The amendment shifted the power of redistricting from the Virginia General Assembly to a political commission composed of four members from the Virginia Senate, with two from each party; four members from the Virginia House of Delegates, with two from each party; and eight other citizens of Virginia. The amendment passed with 65.69% of the vote, winning a majority of support in every county and independent city with the exception of Arlington County, Virginia.

== Support ==
The initiative was supported by Republicans and had the support of the Virginia AARP and ACLU.

== Opposition ==
The initiative was opposed by the state Democratic Party and some elected Democrats on the grounds that it would give inordinate power to the judges tasked with selecting citizens for the commission and that the system would not guarantee the representation of minorities on the commission. In August 2020, Former Virginia Democratic Chairman and candidate for Lieutenant Governor in 2021 Paul Goldman wrote a letter to the Virginia Department of Elections, arguing the wording of the question was misleading. The Virginia Supreme Court rejected this challenge saying that the Department of Elections must put the question on the ballot with the wording agreed to by the legislature.

== Polling ==
Question 1

Poll source	Date(s) administered	Sample size (Note: Key: A – all adults RV – registered voters LV – likely voters V – unclear)	Margin of error	Yes (for the amendment)	No (against the amendment)	Other	Undecided
Roanoke College	October 23–29, 2020	802 (LV)	± 3.4%	48%	26%	3% (Note: "Refused" with 3%)	4%
Christopher Newport University	October 15–27, 2020	908 (LV)	± 3.4%	54%	24%	–	22%
Civiqs/Daily Kos	October 11–14, 2020	1,231 (LV)	± 3.1%	48%	30%	–	22%
Christopher Newport University	September 9–21, 2020	796 (LV)	± 3.9%	48%	28%	–	24%

== Results ==
The amendment passed with 65.59% of the vote. Only Arlington County voted against the amendment.

Question 1
Choice	Votes	%
For	2,770,704	65.69
Against	1,447,390	34.31
Total	4,218,094	100.00
