= Henry Lord (Maine politician) =

American politician

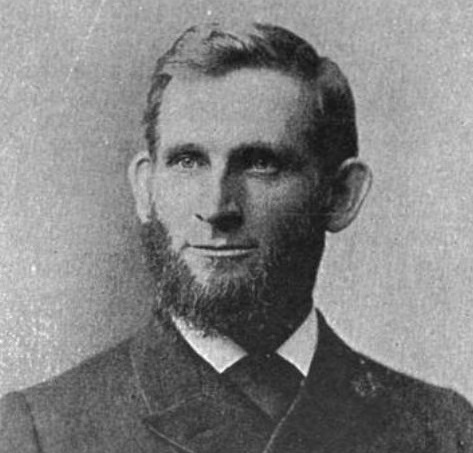
- From 1899's The City of Bangor: The Industries, Resources, Attractions and Business Life of Bangor and Its Environs

Member of the Maine Senate
- In office 1887–1891

Personal details
- Born: May 7, 1847 Bangor, Maine, US
- Died: August 18, 1932 (aged 85) Bangor, Maine, US
- Party: Republican
- Education: Bowdoin College (BA); Harvard University (LLB)

Henry Lord (born May 7, 1847 – August 18, 1932) was an American businessman and politician from Bangor, Maine. Lord served 4 terms in the Maine Legislature. In 1877 and 1878, he was elected to single-year terms to the Maine House of Representatives. In 1878, he was Speaker. In 1886, Bangor voters sent Lord back to Augusta to serve in the Maine Senate. He was re-elected two years later and chosen by his fellow Senators as Senate President. He also served on the Bangor City Council.

Outside of the legislature, Lord was a well-known businessman involved exporting products. He was also president of the board of trustees of the Maine State College and president of the board of Westbrook Seminary.
