= One City Center (Maine) =

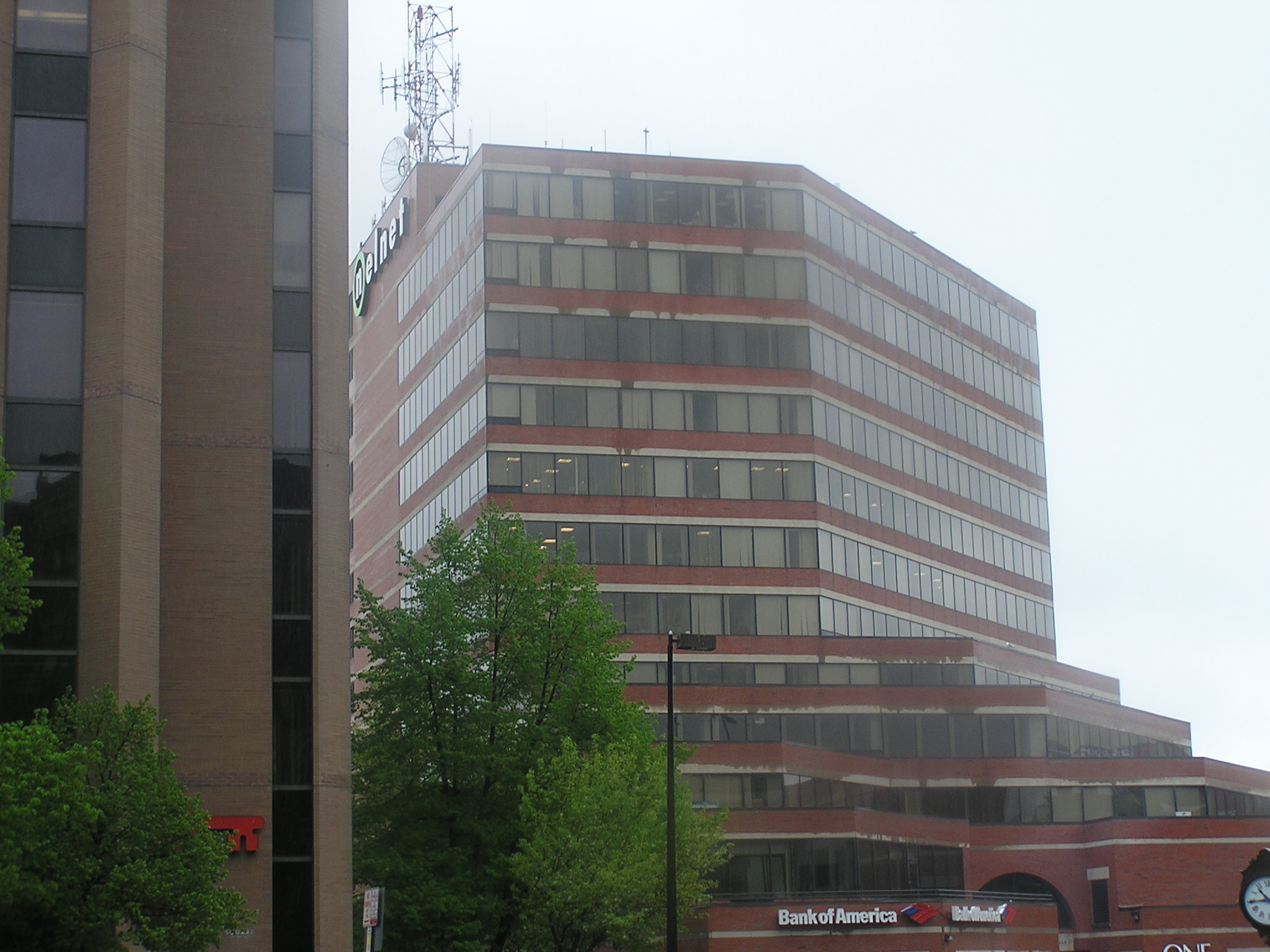
- The building in 2008

- Location within Maine

General information
- Type: High-rise building
- Location: Portland, Maine, United States, 1 City Center
- Coordinates: 43°39′27″N 70°15′26″W
- Completed: 1985; 41 years ago

Technical details
- Floor count: 13

One City Center is an office building located in Monument Square, Portland, Maine. The building serves as the northern New England offices for Bank of America, and a Bank of America logo is featured at the building's highest point. It consists of 13 floors and features a five-story atrium with a full-service food court inside the building. The building was completed in 1985. Its entrance is located on what used to be Middle Street, prior to this section being pedestrianized in the 20th century.
