= 2016 Massachusetts Question 1 =

Question 1
- Massachusetts Authorization of a Second Slots Location Initiative

Results
Choice	Votes	%
Yes	1,240,877	39.26%
No	1,919,893	60.74%
Valid votes	3,160,770	93.55%
Invalid or blank votes	218,031	6.45%
Total votes	3,378,801	100.00%
Registered voters/turnout	3,402,809	99.29%

No
90–100%
80–90%
70–80%
60–70%
50–60%
Yes
90–100%
70–80%
60–70%
50–60%
Other
Tie

The Massachusetts Expand Slot Machine Gaming Initiative was a 2016 Massachusetts ballot measure. Also known as Question 1, it was an indirect initiated state statute question that would allow the Massachusetts Gaming Commission to issue an additional license for another slot machine parlor to exist in the state. The referendum question said that the extra slots parlor could only be permitted on a site that was at least 4 acres (1.6 ha) in size and located within 1,500 feet (460 m) of a racecourse. The only location in the state where this would have applied was Suffolk Downs in East Boston.

- A "yes" vote would allow a second slots parlor to exist in Massachusetts.
- A "no" vote would leave the current number of one slots parlor place.

== Results ==
The measure was not approved, voting was 57% "no", 37% "yes", and 6% left blank.
