= The National Consumer Voice for Quality Long-Term Care =

American advocacy organization

- Formation: 1975
- Founder: Elma Holder
- Type: Non-profit
- Purpose: Elder Care in Long-term Residential Facilities
- Headquarters: Washington, D.C.
- Method: Advocacy
- Members: Over 1000
- Executive director: Lori O. Smetanka
- Revenue: Grants and Donations
- Staff: 9
- Volunteers: 3
- Website: www.theconsumervoice.org

The National Consumer Voice for Quality Long-Term Care (formerly NCCNHR) was founded by Elma L. Holder in 1975. It is an American non-profit advocacy group which focuses on improving the quality of care for long-term care consumers. The Consumer Voice is the source for long-term care education, advocacy, and policy analysis at both the state and federal level. The organization addresses issues such as inadequate staffing in nursing homes, maintenance of residents' rights and empowerment of residents, and support for family members and development of family councils.

== National Residents' Rights Month ==
Residents' Rights Month is designated by the Consumer Voice and is celebrated in October each year to honor residents living in all long-term care facilities, including nursing homes, sub-acute units, assisted living, board and care and retirement communities. It is a time for celebration and recognition offering an opportunity for every facility to focus on and celebrate awareness of dignity, respect and the value of each individual resident.
