= Portland Press Herald =

Daily newspaper in Portland, Maine, U.S.

- The April 4, 2007, front page of the Portland Press Herald
- Type: Daily newspaper
- Format: Broadsheet
- Owner: Maine Trust for Local News
- Founders: J. T. Gilman; Joseph B. Hall; Newell A. Foster
- Publisher: Stefanie Manning (Managing Director)
- Editor: Carolyn Fox (Executive Editor)
- Founded: 1921; 105 years ago
- Headquarters: 295 Gannett Drive; South Portland, Maine, U.S.
- Country: United States
- ISSN: 2689-5900 (print); 2689-5919 (web)
- OCLC number: 9341113
- Website: pressherald.com

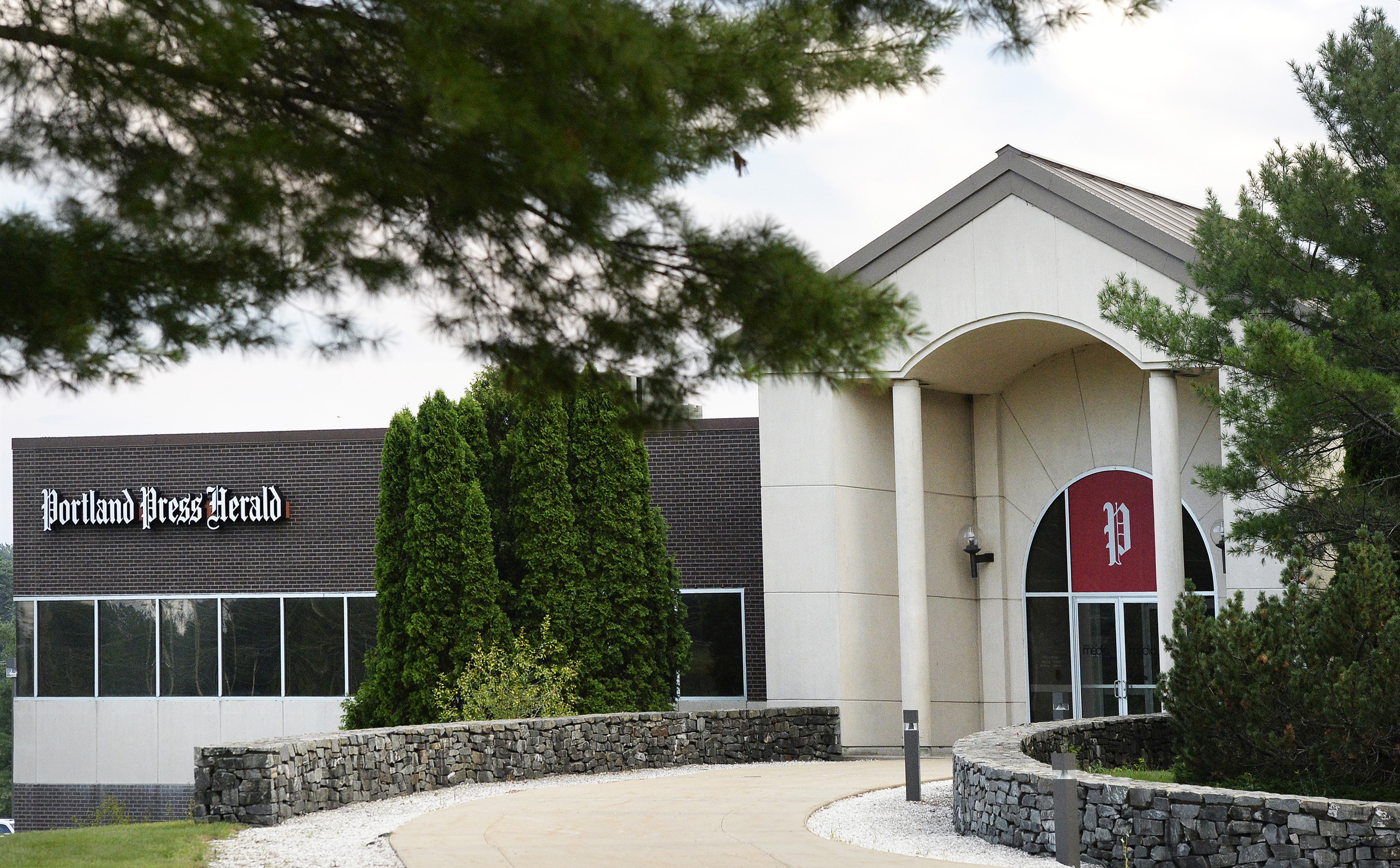
The Portland Press Herald is produced, printed and distributed from the company's headquarters in South Portland, Maine, with news bureaus in downtown Portland and at the State House in Augusta.

The Portland Press Herald is a daily newspaper based in South Portland, Maine, with a statewide readership. The Press Herald mainly serves southern Maine and is focused on the greater metropolitan area of Portland. It is the most distributed newspaper in the state of Maine.

Founded in 1921, its roots extend to Maine's earliest newspapers, the Falmouth Gazette & Weekly Advertiser, started in 1785, and the Eastern Argus, first published in Portland in 1803. For most of the 20th century, it was the cornerstone of Guy Gannett Communications, before being sold to The Seattle Times Company in 1998.

Since 2023, it has been a part of the Maine Trust for Local News (METLN), a nonprofit group run by the National Trust for Local News that includes four other daily newspapers and 17 weekly newspapers.

== History ==
=== Guy Gannett ownership ===
In 1921, the Portland Daily Press was merged with the Portland Herald to form the Portland Press Herald in a sale of the Press from then U.S. Senator Frederick Hale to Guy P. Gannett, who had bought the Herald earlier the same year. The first edition of the Portland Press Herald was published on November 21, 1921. The Press Herald's circulation skyrocketed in the first year of Gannett's ownership, when the paper sold for two cents; circulation went from a little over 18,000 to nearly 29,000. Under Gannett's ownership, the traditionally pro-Republican newspaper adopted a balanced editorial approach; during the 1922 gubernatorial campaign, the newspaper published Democratic candidate William Robinson Pattangall's criticism of the Republican incumbent, Governor Percival Baxter. In a letter to readers, Gannett wrote, "The American people think for themselves. They want and should be given the news and all the news fully and uncolored by any personal or political consideration."

In the 1920s, Gannett's media empire in Maine grew: he purchased the Portland Evening Express and Daily Advertiser in 1925 (whose name he shortened to Evening Express) and by 1929 also bought Augusta's Kennebec Journal and Waterville's Central Maine Morning Sentinel.

In 1923, Gannett built a new building to house all of the paper's operations on 390 Congress Street across from Portland City Hall.

In 1928, the Portland Press Herald merged with the Portland Sunday Telegram to form the Portland Sunday Telegram and Sunday Press Herald .

=== Blethen Maine Newspapers ===
In 1998, the family trust that ran what was by now Guy Gannett Communications decided to break up its media interests. Ultimately, it decided to sell the Press Herald to The Seattle Times Company. Gannett officials cited shared values; the Times Company was also a family-owned business, and its owners, the Blethen family, had roots in Maine. The Press Herald and its sister publications were reorganized as Blethen Maine Newspapers, an independent division of The Seattle Times Company.

A paid advertisement in the newspaper's February 3, 2007, "religion and values" section, placed by the First Baptist Church of South Portland, listed the sermon as "The Only Way to Destroy the Jewish Race"; this caused outrage in Greater Portland's Jewish community, and led to an apology by the minister of that church. Two weeks later, an ad for PeoplesChoice Credit Union ran, depicting a "Fee Bandit" character that used stock photography of a Hasidic Jew to represent the character rather than the Old West banker intended for the visual representation. This incident prompted investigations by the Anti-Defamation League; Steven Wessler, director of the Center for the Prevention of Hate Violence and the person in charge of dealing with hate crimes in the state; and the Jewish Community Alliance. The newspaper's management, as well as the credit union, later apologized for the advertisements; the newspaper said it would scrutinize ad content better in the future.

On March 17, 2008, the Press Herald converted from its traditional multi-section format to two sections. A brief editorial highlighted advertising concerns and said the other sections could be found online. The next day, the Blethens announced that they were putting the Press Herald and its other Maine newspaper properties up for sale. The Portland Press Herald also had three rounds of job cuts in 2008; in the third round of cuts, the newspapers' owner eliminated 36 jobs and closed the news bureaus in Augusta, Biddeford, Bath, and Washington, D.C., in response to declining newspaper ad revenue.

=== Richard Connor ownership ===
After more than a year on the market, on June 15, 2009, the papers were sold to MaineToday Media, Inc., headed by Richard L. Connor, publisher of Times Leader in Wilkes-Barre, Pennsylvania, with financing from HM Capital Partners and Citizens Bank. MaineToday also owned a variety of Maine press properties, including the Kennebec Journal, Morning Sentinel, and Bath's Coastal Journal, as well as mainetoday.com.

Although MaineToday originally announced a plan to move the paper's offices out of downtown into the South Portland printing plant, it was later reported that the company's headquarters would move to One City Center in downtown Portland. As part of the sale, Portland Newspaper Guild members took a 10% pay cut in exchange for 15% ownership in MaineToday Media. More than 30 non-union jobs were eliminated.

Connor's short tenure was characterized by controversy and a rapid decline in the newspaper's financial condition. On September 11, 2010, the Press Herald reported on local Ramadan celebrations with a front-page story. Later that day, Connor insisted on apologizing to readers for his editors' decision to run that story. "Many saw Saturday's front-page story and photo regarding the local observance of the end of Ramadan as offensive, particularly on the day, September 11, when our nation and the world were paying tribute to those who died in the 9/11 terrorist attacks nine years ago," wrote Connor.

Connor's apology attracted nationwide scorn. In Time magazine, critic James Poniewozik called Connor's behavior "craven" and "depressing for the state of journalism." In an appearance on NPR's On the Media, Connor admitted that "some of the people who complained about the lack of 9/11 coverage were really couching anti-Muslim and anti-Islamic attitudes," but refused to retract his apology, and he eventually hung up on host Bob Garfield before the segment was over.

Connor demonstrated a similar lack of ability in managing the business side of the newspaper. In 2011, he eliminated 61 positions, many of which were in the newsroom, and in November of that year, a paper supplier sued the newspaper for $124,000 in unpaid bills. Connor finally left the newspaper at the end of 2011 under strong pressure from the board of directors and a restructuring firm that had taken over day-to-day management.

=== S. Donald Sussman/Maine Values LLC ownership ===
Maine Values LLC, a company owned by wealthy businessman and philanthropist S. Donald Sussman, made a $3–4 million investment in MaineToday Media in February 2012, acquiring a 5% equity stake in the company and a seat on its board. The next month, Maine Values boosted its ownership stake in MaineToday to 75%. Sussman, who lived in North Haven, Maine, therefore held a majority stake in the newspapers.

In 2013, Travelers Casualty & Surety Co. paid MaineToday Media over $500,000 under the company's employee theft insurance policy to recoup money that former publisher Richard P. Connor had allegedly stolen from the company for unauthorized personal use. Forensic audits by MaineToday and its insurers had revealed that Connor had given himself unauthorized salary increases and used company funds to pay for personal expenses, including credit card bills, dental work, an SUV, vacation home rentals, and numerous other personal expenses.

=== Reade Brower ownership ===
In 2015, MaineToday Media was sold to Reade Brower, owner of a number of midcoast Maine newspapers and a printing operation in Brunswick, Maine. Over a decade, Brower has consolidated six of Maine's seven daily newspapers, as well as 21 weekly newspapers, under his ownership.

=== Maine Trust for Local News ===
In July 2023, it was announced that a national nonprofit, the National Trust for Local News, would buy the Press Herald from Brower. The Press Herald, along with 4 daily and 17 weekly Maine papers owned by Brower, is part of the new Maine Trust for Local News, a subsidiary of the National Trust for Local News. In 2024, the Maine Trust for Local News implemented a centralized organizational structure across its properties. Carolyn Fox serves as the trust's first executive editor, overseeing journalists across all titles, while Scott Monroe was named the first managing editor, overseeing newsroom production, digital operations, and community editors of weekly newspapers. As of 2025, the Maine Trust operates with 363 employees across Maine.

The company is the consolidated former media companies MaineToday Media, Alliance Media Group, and Sun Media Group. Organizational details of the trust are not public.

METLN's new ownership led to a number of leadership resignations. Managing editor Nita Lelyveld left. Executive editor Steve Greenlee left the paper one year later to become a Boston University professor. Greenlee told the Poynter Institute that his resignation came at "a time of great stress." In October 2024, Greenlee was replaced by Carolyn Fox, the former managing editor of the Tampa Bay Times. In late 2024, publisher Lisa DiSisto stepped down after 12 years. Advertising executive Stefanie Manning, who co-owns a Portland diner and the Harvest on the Harbor food festival, become managing director. Manning told staff the Maine Trust for Local News lost more than $500,000 in 2024.

In December 2024, National Trust for Local New co-founder and CEO Elizabeth Hansen Shapiro resigned, after her salary rise was criticized. Lewiston Sun Journal publisher Jody Jalbert, who worked for the paper for 36 years, also resigned. In January 2025, syndicated and freelance sports, culture and opinion writers for the Portland Press Herald were laid off. In March 2025, the Maine Trust for Local News announced 49 layoffs in production, circulation and advertising. In June 2025, the newspaper eliminated a managing editor position leaving it with only one managing editor.

In September 2025, nearly 50 reporters, photographers, copy editors, designers, advertising representatives and business staff at the Lewiston Sun Journal, The Times Record in Brunswick, and weekly newspapers voted to join the News Guild of Maine over concerns about pay equity and job security. Prior to the vote, the union represented more than 100 workers at the Portland Press Herald, Lewiston Sun Journal, Kennebec Journal and Morning Sentinel.

== Journalists ==
Notable alumni of the paper include Thomas Haskell, known as Cap'n Haskell, who covered marine news for the Eastern Argus newspaper from 1857 to 1920 until it merged with the Portland Press and stayed with the paper until three months prior to his death in 1928; May Craig, who was Washington correspondent from 1935 to 1965; sportswriter Steve Buckley, who later joined the Boston Herald; sportswriter Jerry Crasnick, who later worked for ESPN and is now senior advisor to the Major League Baseball Players Association; Marjorie Standish, who wrote a food column for the Maine Sunday Telegram for 25 years; former New York Times music critic Allan Kozinn, who was the classical music critic from 2015 to 2020; investigative journalist and book author Colin Woodard, who won a George Polk Award in 2012, was named Maine Journalist of the Year in 2015, and was a finalist for a Pulitzer Prize in 2016; food columnist Avery Yale Kamila, ranked by polling firm YouGov as one of The Most Popular Columnists in America; and sports broadcaster and NESN anchor Tom Caron.

== Awards ==
In 2006, the paper received a Missouri Lifestyle Journalism Award for General Excellence, Class III.

In 2012, Maine Sunday Telegram reporter Colin Woodard received a George Polk Award in the "Education Reporting" category "for detailing how online education companies steered development of Maine’s digital education policies."

In 2016, Colin Woodard of the Portland Press Herald was a finalist for the 2016 Pulitzer Prize in Explanatory Reporting for his "compelling account of dramatic ecological changes occurring in the warming ocean region from Nova Scotia to Cape Cod."

In 2016, the Portland Press Herald reporters Whit Richardson and Steve Mistler received a Gerald Loeb Award for their 2015 series "Payday at the Mill" in the "Local" category. The series detailed a lack of accountability in the Maine New Markets Capital Investment program, a state tax-incentive program.

== Editorial stance ==
The newspaper's predecessor, the Portland Daily Press, was formed as a pro-Republican newspaper in an era when most American newspapers had strong political allegiances. In the 1920s, under Guy P. Gannett's leadership, the newspaper adopted a more balanced editorial approach, and today the news and opinion sections of the paper are separate.

In 1929 and 1930, the Portland Press Herald and the Portland Evening News "waged an editorial war" about the Kellogg–Briand Pact and the 1930 London Conference on naval arms limitations: the Evening News took a pacifist view, arguing in favor of the Pact; the Press Herald took the opposite view, calling the Pact "a delusion and a dream." This dispute illustrated a political chasm within the Maine Republican Party at the time between "Old Guard regulars" and pacifists.

Later in the 20th century, the Press Herald was regarded as having a more liberal and pro-Democratic editorial stance than the Bangor Daily News, which once leaned toward conservatism and Republicans. Over its history, however, the Press Herald "has covered and endorsed candidates of various political persuasions, including independents Angus King, who was elected governor in 1994 and 1998, and Eliot Cutler, who came in second in the 2010 gubernatorial campaign." The Press Herald endorsed conservative Republican candidates (Dean Scontras and Jason Levesque) in both of Maine's congressional districts in 2010. They were defeated by the Democratic incumbents, Chellie Pingree and Mike Michaud. In the 2016 presidential election, the paper's editorial board endorsed Democratic candidate Hillary Clinton. The paper endorsed an override of Governor Paul LePage's veto of L.D. 1504, a pro-solar energy bill.

== Online ==
Content from the Portland Press Herald appears on its website, pressherald.com. The newspaper operates a metered paywall system where readers may access a limited number of articles before a subscription is required. Certain content including obituaries, classifieds, public notices, puzzles, podcasts, and events remains freely accessible. Digital subscribers receive access to the website, mobile apps, and digital replica ePaper editions, with household subscription sharing available for up to four email addresses. According to 2024 data, the newspaper maintains a digital audience averaging 1.5 million users monthly.

The Portland Press Herald acquired the domain name Portland.com in 1996 for free, using it as the Web address for the papers; Under Richard Connor, Portland.com was sold to a marketing firm and became a visitor's guide for the city of Portland, Oregon, in 2004.

== Press Herald Building ==
In 1923, Guy Gannett built the Press Herald Building to house all of the paper's operations at 390 Congress Street across from Portland City Hall. An addition was added to the north side of the building facing Congress Street in 1948. In 2010, under Richard Connor's ownership, the newspaper sold the building and printing plant (attached by a tunnel running under Congress Street) and moved its news staff to the nearby One City Center office building.

In 2015, the 110-room Press Hotel opened in the newspaper's former headquarters. It was developed by Jim Brady and sold to a San Francisco-based real estate private equity firm in 2021.

In 1988, the newspaper opened a $40 million print plant at 295 Gannet Drive in South Portland. In 2016, J.B. Brown & Co. purchased the print plant and its surrounding 21 acres in an office park for a reported $4.9 million. J.B. Brown & Co. then leased the building back to the newspaper. The newspaper's newsroom, printing press and distribution functions were moved to South Portland, where they remain to this day.
