= List of newspapers in Maine =

This is a list of newspapers in Maine.

== Daily newspapers ==
- Bangor Daily News – Bangor
- Kennebec Journal – Augusta
- Morning Sentinel – Waterville
- Portland Press Herald – Portland
- Sun Journal – Lewiston
- The Times Record – Brunswick
- The Daily Bulldog – Farmington (Online only)
- The County – Aroostook County

== Weekly newspapers ==
- The Advertiser Democrat – Norway
- American Journal – Westbrook
- Augusta Capital Weekly – Augusta
- The Bar Harbor Times – Bar Harbor
- The Bates Student – Lewiston
- The Boothbay Register – Boothbay Harbor
- The Bowdoin Orient – Brunswick
- The Bridgton News – Bridgton
- The Calais Advertiser – Calais
- The Castine Patriot – Castine
- The Ellsworth American – Ellsworth
- The Enterprise – Bucksport
- The Forecaster – Falmouth
- Fort Fairfield Journal – Fort Fairfield
- The Island Ad-Vantages – Stonington
- The Island Times – Casco Bay
- The Lincoln County News – Damariscotta
- The Livermore Falls Advertiser – Livermore Falls
- Machias Valley News Observer – Machias
- Magic City Morning Star – Millinocket
- The Maine Campus – Orono
- The Maine Edge – Bangor
- Maine Sunday Telegram – Portland
- Midcoast Villager – Camden
- Mount Desert Islander – Bar Harbor
- The Penobscot Times – Old Town
- Portland Phoenix – Portland
- The Quoddy Tides – Eastport
- Six Towns Times – Freeport
- Twin City Times – Auburn
- The Weekly Packet – Blue Hill
- The Weekly Sentinel – Wells
- Wiscasset Newspaper – Boothbay Harbor
- York County Coast Star – Kennebunk
- York Weekly – York

== Defunct ==
- Aroostook Republican & News (Caribou) (1880–2025) – Merged into The County
- Bangor Daily Commercial (1872–1949)
- Evening Express (Portland) (Portland) (1882–1991)
- Fiddlehead Focus (Fort Kent) (2013–2023) – Absorbed by The County
- Houlton Pioneer Times (Houlton) (1857–2025) – Merged into The County
- Portland Sunday Telegram
- The Journal Tribune (Biddeford)
- The Maine Times (Portland) – Ceased publication in 2002; not affiliated with the independently relaunched Maine Times (2025)
- The St. John Valley Times (Madawaska) (1957–2025) – Merged into The County
- The Star-Herald (Presque Isle) (1890–2025) – Merged into The County

== See also ==
Nearby states

- List of newspapers in Massachusetts
- List of newspapers in New Hampshire
- List of newspapers in Vermont

Comprehensive

- Lists of newspapers
- List of newspapers in the United States

Frequency

- List of free daily newspapers in the United States
- List of weekly newspapers in the United States

Circulation

- List of international newspapers originating in the United States
- List of national newspapers in the United States
- List of newspapers in the United States by circulation

Foreign language

- List of French-language newspapers published in the United States
- List of German-language newspapers published in the United States
- List of Spanish-language newspapers published in the United States

Specialty

- List of African-American newspapers in the United States
- List of alternative weekly newspapers in the United States
- List of business newspapers in the United States
- List of family-owned newspapers in the United States
- List of Jewish newspapers in the United States
- List of LGBTQ periodicals in the United States
- List of student newspapers in the United States
- List of supermarket tabloids in the United States
- List of underground press in the United States

Other

- List of defunct newspapers of the United States
