= 2016 Maine Question 3 =

Citizen-initiated referendum on gun background checks

Question 3: Citizen Initiative
- An Act To Require Background Checks for Gun Sales

Results
Choice	Votes	%
Yes	366,770	48.20%
No	394,157	51.80%
Valid votes	760,927	98.60%
Invalid or blank votes	10,781	1.40%
Total votes	771,708	100.00%
- County results No 70–80% 60–70% 50–60% Yes 60–70% 50–60%

Maine Question 3, formally An Act to Require Background Checks for Gun Sales, was a citizen-initiated referendum question that appeared on the Maine November 8, 2016 statewide ballot. It sought to require a background check for virtually all gun transfers in Maine, with some exceptions. As the Maine Legislature and Governor Paul LePage declined to enact the proposal as written, it appeared on the ballot along with elections for President of the United States, Maine's two United States House seats, the Maine Legislature, other statewide ballot questions, and various local elections.

The question was defeated, with 51.8% of voters opposed.

== Background ==
Efforts to expand background checks of gun buyers have not succeeded at the Maine State House. In 2013, an effort to create a civil penalty of someone not conducting a background check on a buyer later found to not be allowed to possess a gun passed the Maine Legislature, but was vetoed by Governor Paul LePage, a strong gun rights supporter. An outright requirement to conduct background checks on gun buyers in private sales failed to pass the Legislature that same year.

On August 24, 2015, the group Maine Moms Demand Action (MMDA) filed paperwork with the Maine Secretary of State's office to launch a petition drive to require virtually all gun sales to have a background check of the buyer conducted by a licensed gun dealer. The proposal includes exceptions for transfers between family members, temporary loans of firearms while hunting or sport shooting, an emergency need for self-defense, and other limited exceptions.

MMDA submitted the 84,600 signatures they gathered on January 19, 2016. The Secretary of State's office announced on February 18 that 65,821 signatures were validated, well over the 61,123 required to place a question on the ballot. The question will appear on the ballot as "Do you want to require background checks prior to the sale or transfer of firearms between individuals not licensed as firearms dealers, with failure to do so punishable by law, and with some exceptions for family members, hunting, self-defense, lawful competitions, and shooting range activity?"

== Campaign ==
Gun rights supporters criticized the proposal. The Sportsman's Alliance of Maine's executive director, David Trahan, stated that while background checks sound good in theory, they are difficult to implement and enforce, which is why there has been no national universal background check system. He also criticized the potential involvement of Michael Bloomberg and other out-of-state gun control groups spending large amounts of money in Maine. State Senator Eric Brakey criticized the effort as a back-door attempt to establish a gun registry.

Supporters officially launched their campaign on May 14, 2016, calling themselves Mainers for Responsible Gun Ownership. The group includes law enforcement officials, gun violence survivors, sportsmen, gun owners and gun violence prevention advocates. They state that background checks will close a loophole in existing gun laws which allow criminals, domestic abusers, and the mentally ill to obtain guns without a background check by not going to a licensed dealer. They also claim that states with expansive background checks experience lower rates of women being shot to death by their intimate partners, as well as lower rates of police officers being killed by handguns.

Governor Paul LePage, in expressing opposition to the referendum, called it unconstitutional. Referendum supporters cite a 2007 decision written by U.S. Supreme Court Justice Antonin Scalia stating that background checks are constitutional.

The Maine Warden Service, while not officially opposing the referendum, expressed concern that its passage "could make criminals out of responsible firearm owners" and that it would be difficult to enforce.

=== Notable endorsements ===
==== Supporters ====
- Maine Moms Demand Action
- Sean Geagan, chief, Bucksport Police Department
- Bucky Owen, former commissioner, Department of Inland Fisheries and Wildlife
- Bill Vail, former commissioner, Department of Inland Fisheries and Wildlife
- Michael Gahagan, chief, Caribou Police Department
- Bangor Daily News
- Equality Maine
- Maine Chiefs of Police Association
- Ellsworth American
- Maine Women's Lobby
- MaineToday Media newspapers; Portland Press Herald, Kennebec Journal, Morning Sentinel
- USA Today
- The Times Record, newspaper of Brunswick

==== Opponents ====
- Eric Brakey, Republican State Senator
- Darrell Crandall, Aroostook County Sheriff
- Barry Curtis, Washington County Sheriff
- Donna Dennison, Knox County Sheriff
- Wayne Gallant, Oxford County Sheriff
- John Goggin, Piscataquis County Sheriff
- Scott Kane, Hancock County Sheriff
- William King, York County Sheriff
- Dale Lancaster, Somerset County Sheriff
- Paul LePage, Governor of Maine
- Jeff McCabe, Majority Leader of the Maine House of Representatives
- Troy Morton, Penobscot County Sheriff
- Scott Nichols, Franklin County Sheriff
- Eric Samson, Androscoggin County Sheriff
- Jeffery Trafton, Waldo County Sheriff
- Gun Owners of Maine
- Sportsmen's Alliance of Maine
- National Rifle Association Institute for Legislative Action

=== Polling ===
Date of opinion poll	Conducted by	Sample size (likely voters)	Yes	No	Undecided	Margin of Error
October 20–25, 2016	University of New Hampshire	761	52%	43%	5%	±3.6%
September 15–20, 2016	University of New Hampshire	509	61%	33%	6%	±4.3%

== Results ==
Question 3 Results
County	Yes	Votes	No	Votes
Androscoggin	43.6%	24726	56.3%	31895
Aroostook	34.8%	12,386	65.1%	23,117
Cumberland	64.4%	112,537	35.5%	61,996
Franklin	33.9%	5,741	66.1%	11,169
Hancock	46.3%	15,135	53.6%	17,521
Kennebec	41.4%	27,859	58.5%	39,389
Knox	52.5%	12,373	47.4%	11,154
Lincoln	44.8%	9,851	55.1%	12,097
Oxford	33.8%	10,835	66.1%	21,165
Penobscot	38.4%	31,443	61.5%	50,432
Piscataquis	26.8%	2,520	74.2%	6,890
Sagadahoc	49.7%	11,002	50.2%	11,109
Somerset	27.2%	7,233	72.7%	19,282
Waldo	39.8%	9,193	60.2%	13,915
Washington	32.1%	5,373	67.9%	11,387
York	56.2%	65,385	43.8%	51,019
UOCAVA	83.7%	3,178	16.3%	620
Total	48.2%	366,770	51.8%	394,157
