= 2016 Maine Question 4 =

Question 4: Citizen Initiative
- An Act to Raise the Minimum Wage

Results
Choice	Votes	%
Yes	420,892	55.50%
No	337,486	44.50%
Valid votes	758,378	98.27%
Invalid or blank votes	13,330	1.73%
Total votes	771,708	100.00%
Yes
60–70%
50–60%
No
50–60%

Maine Question 4, formally An Act to Raise the Minimum Wage, is a citizen-initiated referendum question that appeared on the Maine November 8, 2016 statewide ballot. It sought to increase Maine's minimum wage from $7.50 per hour to $12 an hour by 2020, as well as increasing the minimum wage for tipped employees gradually to the same level by 2024. It would also index increases after 2024 to inflation. As the Maine Legislature and Governor Paul LePage declined to enact the proposal as written, it appeared on the ballot along with elections for President of the United States, Maine's two U.S. House seats, the Legislature, other statewide ballot questions, and various local elections. Efforts to place a competing, more moderate proposal alongside the citizen-initiated bill were unsuccessful.

The proposal was enacted by voters, with 55% in favor. The changes to the tip credit were later reversed by the Legislature.

== Background ==
Efforts to increase Maine's $7.50 minimum wage have been stymied at the Maine State House by Republican Governor Paul LePage, who vetoed a proposal to increase the wage to $9.50 over three years in 2013. Legislative Republicans sustained the veto, despite indications an increase has broad support from Mainers. One poll indicated that support for raising the federal minimum wage was at 75% of Mainers, including 59% of Republicans.

== Campaign ==
The Maine AFL–CIO and Maine People's Alliance launched a petition drive on April 16, 2015, seeking to collect upwards of the roughly 60,000 signatures needed to place a question on the ballot. The Maine Secretary of State's Office announced on February 16, 2016, that organizers had submitted over 75,000 valid signatures to place the question on the ballot. The bill went before the Legislature, which could have passed it and sent it to Governor LePage for his signature or rejection, or simply allowed it to go to the ballot. It also could have placed its own measure dealing with the minimum wage alongside the proposal as a competing measure. Business groups, including the Retail Association of Maine and the Maine Chamber of Commerce, considered a competing proposal to put before the Legislature to place on the ballot. The Chamber cited national polling indicating 6 in 10 Americans support a $12 per hour wage an indication that the referendum would likely pass, and is seeking to mitigate what it sees as harm to businesses.

=== Competing measures ===
The Bangor Chamber of Commerce announced their competing proposal on February 26, which is to raise the minimum wage to $10 an hour by 2020, starting with a $1 increase and then 50¢ a year thereafter until reaching $10. It would also maintain the tip credit towards the minimum wage, unlike the referendum. State Rep. Stacey Guerin (R-Glenburn) said she would sponsor the bill. Gov. LePage announced that he would support the competing proposal as he viewed it as less harmful to businesses, largely due to maintaining the tip credit.

The idea of a competing proposal does not have universal support among opponents of the referendum, with some like State Rep. Heather Sirocki (R-Scarborough) stating that they oppose any increase in the minimum wage and would rather focus on defeating the referendum than passing a more moderate proposal. House Majority Leader Jeff McCabe also indicated a more moderate proposal would face difficulty in the House, stating that "we had this opportunity last year" and that it was now too late for a compromise. One attempt by House Republicans to place a competing measure on the ballot was rejected by a 78–67 vote. The GOP-led Senate was able to vote on the proposal but without House support the effort failed. Competing proposals with citizen initiatives are rare in Maine. The previous one was in 2003. One in 1996, involving forest clearcutting, generated significant confusion for voters.

Minority House Republicans have said they will oppose efforts to allocate a $55 million revenue surplus to certain programs and the budget stabilization fund(also known as the rainy day fund) unless Democrats agree to permit the competing proposal to go to the ballot.

Governor LePage has also stated he will not consider any additional spending unless a competing measure is placed on the ballot. He submitted his own proposal for one on April 5, 2016, at the request of Senate Majority Leader Andre Cushing, which is similar to others that were already rejected by the House. LePage has claimed an increase will hurt elderly Social Security recipients and young people, who would be unable to get jobs due to more experienced people being unemployed as a result of the wage increase. House Majority Leader Jeff McCabe stated that while he expects further attempts at a competing proposal, they would likely be rejected.

A last-ditch effort by Republicans to pass an emergency bill to immediately institute a gradual increase to a $10 minimum wage, starting with an increase to $9 on July 1, 2016, cleared the Senate by a 22–10 vote but failed to get the necessary 2/3 vote required to enact an emergency measure. Republicans stated that the bill, submitted by Governor LePage, was made an emergency measure to avoid being considered a competing measure that would be required to appear on the ballot.

=== Question wording ===
On June 16, 2016, the Maine State Chamber of Commerce filed its objection to the proposed wording of the question that appears on the ballot. They criticized Secretary Dunlap for not including information about the indexing of the minimum wage to inflation after 2024 as well as the elimination of the tip credit. They proposed their own wording of the question which did contain those aspects of the question, which they claimed would be clearer and reflect the true intent of the referendum. Referendum supporters criticized the MSCC's proposed wording as "long, complex and byzantine", noting that Maine state statutes require referendum questions to be simple, concise, clear and direct. They called the proposal an effort to confuse voters.

Dunlap released the final wording of the question on June 23, which will read as "Do you want to raise the minimum hourly wage of $7.50 to $9 in 2017, with annual $1 increases up to $12 in 2020, and annual cost-of-living increases thereafter; and do you want to raise the direct wage for service workers who receive tips from half the minimum wage to $5 in 2017, with annual $1 increases until it reaches the adjusted minimum wage?"

=== Notable endorsements ===
==== Supporters ====
- John Baldacci, former governor of Maine
- Joe Baldacci, Bangor City councilor
- Maine AFL–CIO
- Maine People's Alliance
- MaineToday Media newspapers: Portland Press Herald, Kennebec Journal, Morning Sentinel
- Equality Maine
- Bangor Daily News

==== Opponents ====
- Andre Cushing, Maine Senate assistant majority leader
- Paul LePage, Governor of Maine
- Maine Heritage Policy Center
- Heather Sirocki, state representative (R-Scarborough)
- Ellsworth American

=== Polling ===
Date of opinion poll	Conducted by	Sample size (likely voters)	Yes	No	Undecided	Margin of error
October 20–25, 2016	University of New Hampshire	761	57%	35%	8%	±3.6%
September 15–20, 2016	University of New Hampshire	506	60%	12%	28%	±4.3%

== Results ==
Question 4 Results
County	Yes	Votes	No	Votes
Androscoggin	50.9%	28,795	49.1%	27,735
Aroostook	53.7%	19,010	46.3%	16,378
Cumberland	61.2%	106,325	38.8%	67,431
Franklin	51.9%	8,740	48.1%	8,108
Hancock	55.4%	18,037	44.6%	14,499
Kennebec	51.4%	34,519	48.6%	32,589
Knox	60.4%	14,169	39.6%	9,294
Lincoln	56.2%	12,297	43.8%	9,567
Oxford	53.2%	16,957	46.8%	14,919
Penobscot	46.9%	38,247	53.1%	43,383
Piscataquis	45%	4,214	55%	5,150
Sagadahoc	56.5%	12,446	43.5%	9,588
Somerset	46.9%	12,414	53.1%	14,036
Waldo	54.2%	12,484	45.8%	10,532
Washington	54.1%	9,050	45.9%	7,688
York	60.5%	70,203	39.5%	45,840
UOCAVA	79.5%	2,985	20.5%	769
Total	55.5%	420,892	45.5%	337,486

== Tip credit restoration ==
After passage of the referendum, some restaurant servers were concerned that loss of the tip credit would mean they would actually get less money than they did with the tip credit, though such a view was not universal among those workers. Restaurant owners were also concerned that their costs would go up, forcing them to reduce hours for workers or raise menu prices. State Sen. Roger Katz stated that voters supporting the referendum did not intend to drive down wages for any group of workers. A public hearing on a bill to restore the tip credit was one of the most heavily attended legislative hearings in all of 2017, with advocates on both sides of the issue testifying. The bill was passed by the Legislature and signed by Gov. LePage on June 27, 2017, to restore the tip credit, though the minimum wage itself was unchanged.
