= Glenwood Plantation, Maine =

- Plantation
- Location of Glenwood Plantation, Maine
- Coordinates: 45°48′38″N 68°07′05″W
- Country: United States
- State: Maine
- County: Aroostook

Area
  - Total: 39.5 sq mi (102.4 km^{2})
  - Land: 38.1 sq mi (98.8 km^{2})
  - Water: 1.4 sq mi (3.6 km^{2})
- Elevation: 558 ft (170 m)

Population (2020)
  - Total: 5
  - Density: 0.13/sq mi (0.051/km^{2})
- Time zone: UTC-5 (Eastern (EST))
  - Summer (DST): UTC-4 (EDT)
- ZIP code: 04497
- Area code: 207
- FIPS code: 23-27855
- GNIS feature ID: 582492

Glenwood Plantation is a plantation located in Aroostook County, Maine, United States. At the 2020 census, the plantation had a total population of 5, making it the least populated municipality in Maine.

== Geography ==
According to the United States Census Bureau, the plantation has a total area of 39.5 square miles (102.4 km^{2}), of which 38.1 square miles (98.8 km^{2}) is land and 1.4 square miles (3.6 km^{2}), or 3.48%, is water.

== Demographics ==
Historical population
Census	Pop.	Note	%±
1870	185		—
1880	198		7.0%
1890	183		−7.6%
1900	178		−2.7%
1910	128		−28.1%
1920	87		−32.0%
1930	77		−11.5%
1940	75		−2.6%
1950	53		−29.3%
1960	30		−43.4%
1970	9		−70.0%
1980	7		−22.2%
1990	8		14.3%
2010	3		—
2020	5		66.7%

== Politics ==
=== Federal politics ===
Glenwood Plantation is located in Maine's 2nd congressional district. Due to its low population, Glenwood Plantation only cast 2 votes in the 2016 presidential election, both of which for Republican nominee and winner Donald Trump. In the House of Representatives elections, it cast both of its votes for incumbent Republican representative Bruce Poliquin. Both ballots voted against legalizing marijuana and requiring background checks to purchase guns. However, they also voted in favor of instituting a surcharge of 3% on Maine income taxes for those with an annual income greater than $200,000 in order to fund public education, and in favor of raising the minimum wage to $12 an hour. The ballots were split on the issue of ranked choice voting. All of these initiatives, except for Question 3 (background checks), eventually passed.

In the 2018 elections, the plantation did not cast any votes.

In the 2020 presidential election, the one ballot cast its sole vote for President Trump and incumbent Republican Susan Collins in the Senate election. Trump would go on to lose Maine as a whole but win the electoral vote from 2nd congressional district, while Collins went on to win the Senate election. In the House of Representatives elections, Republican Dale John Crafts, won the solitary vote from the plantation, though he lost the overall election to incumbent Democrat Jared Golden.

=== State politics ===
In terms of statewide politics, Glenwood Plantation is in the 2nd Senate district of the Maine State Senate, currently represented by Republican, Harold L. Stewart III. Glenwood Plantation cast its sole ballot for Stewart. In the Maine House of Representatives, it is located within the 144th district, currently represented by Republican Gregory Swallow, who also won the plantation's vote in 2020.
