= National Trust for Local News =

American nonprofit news publisher

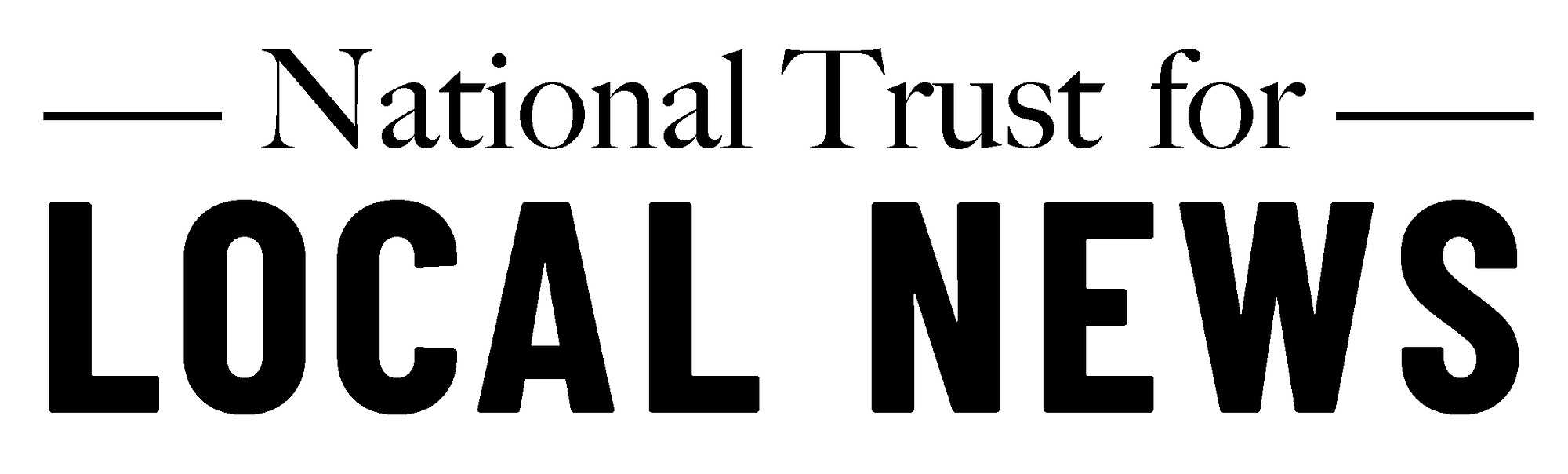
- Logo of the National Trust for Local News
- Abbreviation: NTLN
- Formation: 2021; 5 years ago
- Type: Nonprofit organization
- Legal status: 501(c)(3) public charity
- Headquarters: Englewood, Colorado, U.S.
- CEO: Tom Wiley
- Website: nationaltrustforlocalnews.org

The National Trust for Local News is a nonprofit organization and public charity founded in 2021 to acquire and continue the operations of local newspapers. As of 2025, it has established subsidiary trusts in the U.S. states of Colorado, Maine, and Georgia, through which it owns about 60 newspapers. In September 2026, the trust expanded into Vermont where it now owns five newspapers. The organization is a 501(c)(3) organization based in Englewood, Colorado.

== History ==
The National Trust for Local News was founded in 2021 to preserve newspapers using a different approach than earlier journalism-focused nonprofits. The Poynter Institute wrote: "Rather than grants, the trust makes investments. Advice and some control come with the help. But the point is for recipients to gather other investors and develop models for serving small-town news deserts that are losing all local coverage." Unlike most national media chains, the trust aimed to help its news outlets retain local ownership and operating control.

The co-founders were Elizabeth Hansen Shapiro, who became the organization's CEO, Fraser Nelson and others. In fiscal year 2021, the National Trust filed taxes in Lexington, Massachusetts. They have filed from Englewood, Colorado, every year since. As of 2022, the trust operated from 50 West Hampden Avenue in Englewood.

The National Trust's pilot project was to acquire, in partnership with The Colorado Sun, Colorado Community Media (CCM), a family-owned chain of 24 newspapers in the Denver area, in 2021. "The investment partnership is a first-of-its-kind in the country", Axios reported. The two partners established and co-own the Colorado News Conservancy to operate the CCM papers. In spring 2024, the Colorado operation bought a printing press after Gannett closed its printing operation in the state. Their press, The Trust Press, was started in Denver to publish Colorado Community Media's then-25 newspapers.

In summer of 2023, the National Trust purchased, for an undisclosed price from Reade Brower, the Portland Press Herald and a group of affiliated daily and weekly papers in Maine, including the Lewiston Sun Journal, Kennebec Journal, Waterville Morning Sentinel, Brunswick Times Record, and a dozen other weekly newspapers. These newspapers were consolidated into a subsidiary called the Maine Trust for Local News. The deal left Bangor Daily News as the only daily newspaper in the state not controlled by the National Trust.

The trust later bought newspapers in Georgia. In December of 2023, with financial support from multiple foundations, the NTLN announced its Georgia Trust for Local News would begin operations that January. In June 2024, it launched The Macon Melody in Macon, Georgia, its first startup focused on a single city. Mercer University partnered with the Georgia Trust to host the Melody's newsroom. The Georgia Trust also established a partnership with Indiegraf, a news entrepreneurship company, to launch websites for the paper-only acquired newspapers and create newsletters to reach new audiences. DuBose Porter, executive director of the Georgia Trust, stated that "our newspapers ... are producing more great community journalism than ever before".

By July 2024, it had raised $38 million from the Knight Foundation, Google News Initiative, Open Society Foundation, and several dozen more philanthropic foundations and individuals. Its leaders had also shifted from a hands-off model to a more centrally-directed one. "By early 2023, I knew what it would take to sustain local news nationwide: a non-profit owner/operator, with a strong central management team, scaled by philanthropy but sustained by earned revenue. Now we have built that model and it is quickly producing results”, co-founder and CEO Elizabeth Hansen Shapiro told the Poynter Institute.

The National Trust, under the leadership of Hansen Shapiro, "effectively strayed from its original mission", according to the Poynter Institute, when it began moving decision-making roles up to the national organization from the local newspapers themselves. Hansen Shapiro stepped down as CEO in January 2025. A board member said that Hansen Shapiro's transition was part of a movement "from inspiration to execution" within the trust. A committee led the organization in the interim period between CEOs.

That March, the National Trust ceased publication of two newspapers in Colorado. In April 2025, the owner of the Dawson News in Georgia donated his newspaper to the Georgia Trust. Also that April, Tom Wiley was named CEO of the trust; his term began on May 12. The following day, the trust announced that it had sold most of its Colorado-based newspapers to Times Media Group, a for-profit media company based in Arizona. The sale included the Arvada Press, Englewood Herald, Littleton Independent, and Parker Chronicle; the trust retained ownership of seven other newspapers and its community printing press. The Nieman Journalism Lab noted that Times Media Group had historically made staffing cuts or even closed local newspapers after acquiring them, which was contrary to the National Trust's mission of maintaining local outlets' vitality.

In July 2026, the Georgia Trust acquired the Columbus Ledger-Enquirer and The Macon Telegraph to from McClatchy. Following the sale, The Macon Melody will be merged into the Telegraph.

In September 2026, the National Trust purchased the Vermont Community Newspaper Group, assuming ownership of five weekly newspapers in northern and central Vermont: Stowe Reporter, The News and Citizen, The Citizen, Shelburne News, and The Other Paper.
