= 2016 United States House of Representatives elections in Maine =

- November 8, 2016

All 2 Maine seats to the United States House of Representatives
	Majority party	Minority party
Party	Democratic	Republican
Last election	1	1
Seats won	1	1
Seat change	Steady	Steady
Popular vote	386,627	357,447
Percentage	51.93%	48.01%
Swing	▲0.40%	▲9.51%

Democratic
50–60%
60–70%
Republican
50–60%
60–70%

The 2016 United States House of Representatives elections in Maine were held on November 8, 2016, to elect the two U.S. representatives from the state of Maine, one from each of the state's two congressional districts. The elections coincided with the 2016 U.S. presidential election, as well as other elections to the House of Representatives, elections to the United States Senate, and various state and local elections. The primaries were held on June 14.

== Overview ==
=== Statewide ===
Popular vote
Democratic	51.93%
Republican	48.01%

House seats
Democratic	50.00%
Republican	50.00%

=== By district ===
Results of the 2016 United States House of Representatives elections in Maine by district:

District	Democratic		Republican		Others		Total		Result
District	Votes	%	Votes	%	Votes	%	Votes	%	Result
District 1	227,546	57.99%	164,569	41.94%	276	0.07%	392,391	100.0%	Democratic hold
District 2	159,081	45.17%	192,878	54.77%	224	0.06%	352,183	100.0%	Republican hold
Total	386,627	51.93%	357,447	48.01%	500	0.07%	744,574	100.0%	

== District 1 ==
2016 Maine's 1st congressional district election
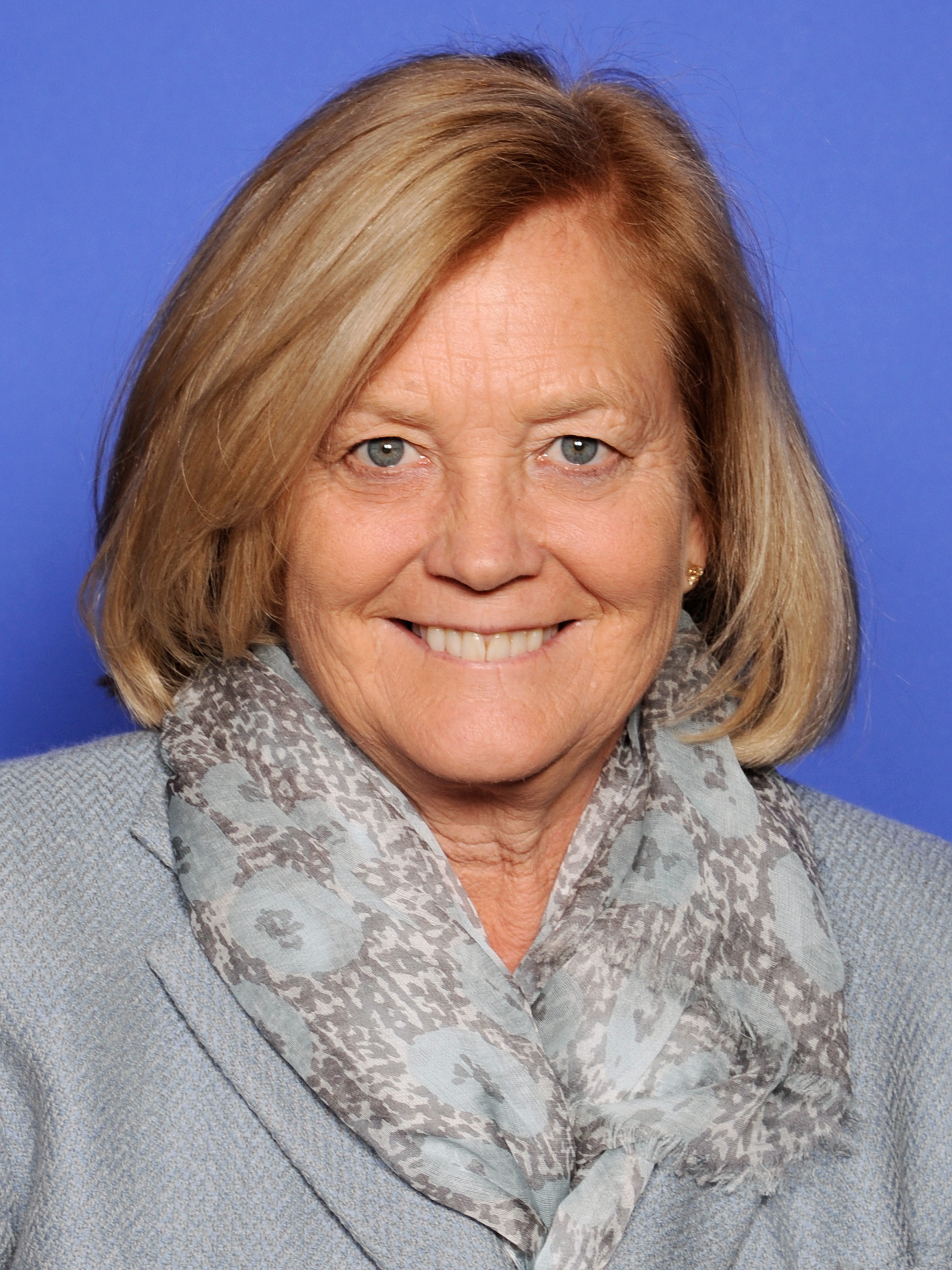

Nominee	Chellie Pingree	Mark Holbrook
Party	Democratic	Republican
Popular vote	227,546	164,569
Percentage	58.0%	41.9%
- County results Pingree: 50–60% 60–70%
U.S. Representative before election
Chellie Pingree
Democratic
Elected U.S. Representative
Chellie Pingree
Democratic

Incumbent Democrat Chellie Pingree, who had represented the district since 2009, ran for re-election. She was re-elected with 60% of the vote in 2014. The district had a PVI of D+9.

=== Democratic primary ===
==== Candidates ====
===== Nominee =====
- Chellie Pingree, incumbent U.S. representative

==== Results ====
Democratic primary results
Party	Candidate	Votes	%
Democratic	Chellie Pingree (incumbent)	28,143	100.0
Total votes		28,143	100.0

=== Republican primary ===
==== Candidates ====
===== Nominee =====
- Mark Holbrook, professional counselor

===== Eliminated in primary =====
- Ande Smith, United States Navy veteran and attorney

==== Debate ====
2016 Maine's 1st congressional district republican primary debate
No.	Date	Host	Moderator	Link	Republican	Republican
Key: P Participant A Absent N Not invited I Invited W Withdrawn						
Key: P Participant A Absent N Not invited I Invited W Withdrawn					Mark Holbrook	Ande Smith
1	Jun. 7, 2016	WMTW (TV)	Paul Merrill		P	P

==== Results ====
After a recount, Holbrook was declared the winner with a margin of 57 votes.

Republican primary results
Party	Candidate	Votes	%
Republican	Mark Holbrook	10,360	50.1
Republican	Ande Smith	10,303	49.9
Total votes		20,663	100.0

=== General election ===
==== Predictions ====
Source	Ranking	As of
The Cook Political Report	Safe D	November 7, 2016
Daily Kos Elections	Safe D	November 7, 2016
Rothenberg	Safe D	November 3, 2016
Sabato's Crystal Ball	Safe D	November 7, 2016
RCP	Safe D	October 31, 2016

==== Polling ====
Poll source	Date(s) administered	Sample size	Margin of error	Chellie Pingree (D)	Mark Holbrook (R)	Other	Undecided
University of New Hampshire	September 15–20, 2016	266 LV	± 6.0%	64%	22%	2%	12%
SurveyUSA	September 4–10, 2016	382 LV	± 5.1%	57%	37%	–	7%
University of New Hampshire	June 15–21, 2016	248 LV	± 4.5%	56%	34%	–	10%

Hypothetical polling

Poll source	Date(s) administered	Sample size	Margin of error	Chellie Pingree (D)	Ande Smith (R)
University of New Hampshire	June 15–21, 2016	248 LV	± 4.5%	55%	34%

==== Endorsements ====
Chellie Pingree (D)

Organizations

- Equality Maine

==== Results ====
Maine's 1st congressional district, 2016
Party	Candidate	Votes	%
Democratic	Chellie Pingree (incumbent)	227,546	58.0
Republican	Mark Holbrook	164,569	41.9
Libertarian	James J. Bouchard (write-in)	276	0.1
Total votes		392,391	100.0
Democratic hold			

== District 2 ==
2016 Maine's 2nd congressional district election
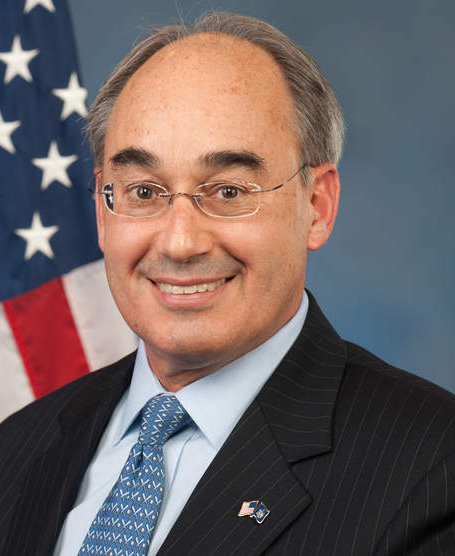

Nominee	Bruce Poliquin	Emily Cain
Party	Republican	Democratic
Popular vote	192,878	159,081
Percentage	54.8%	45.2%
- County results Poliquin: 50%–60% 60–70% Cain: 50%–60%
U.S. Representative before election
Bruce Poliquin
Republican
Elected U.S. Representative
Bruce Poliquin
Republican

Incumbent Republican Bruce Poliquin, who had represented the district since 2015, ran for re-election. He was elected with 47% of the vote in 2014. The district had a PVI of D+2.

=== Republican primary ===
==== Candidates ====
===== Nominee =====
- Bruce Poliquin, incumbent U.S. representative

==== Results ====
Republican primary results
Party	Candidate	Votes	%
Republican	Bruce Poliquin (incumbent)	19,252	100.0
Total votes		19,252	100.0

=== Democratic primary ===
After the 2014 election, Cain indicated she was interested in running against Poliquin in 2016. In December 2014, Cain met with Nancy Pelosi, the Democratic Leader of the House of Representatives, to discuss her potential candidacy. On March 3, 2015, Cain announced that she would be running for the seat.

Bangor City Councilors Joe Baldacci and Ben Sprague were mentioned as potential Democratic candidates. Jeff McCabe, the majority leader of the Maine House of Representatives, indicated that he might run against Poliquin in 2016, but later said that he would not do so.

Troy Jackson, the former majority leader of the Maine Senate, who lost to Cain in the 2014 Democratic primary election, had said he might run as an independent candidate, but he elected to run for his former Senate seat instead.

==== Candidates ====
===== Nominee =====
- Emily Cain, former state senator and nominee for this seat in 2014

===== Withdrawn =====
- Joe Baldacci, Bangor city councilor and brother of former Governor of Maine and U.S. Representative John Baldacci

===== Declined =====
- Troy Jackson, Democratic National Committee member, former state senator, candidate for the seat in 2014 (running for state senate)
- Jeff McCabe, majority leader of the Maine House of Representatives
- Ben Sprague, Bangor city councilor

===== Endorsements =====
Emily Cain

U.S. representatives

- Nancy Pelosi, minority leader of the U.S. House of Representatives (D-CA)

Organizations

- EMILY's List
- Equality Maine

==== Results ====
Democratic primary results
Party	Candidate	Votes	%
Democratic	Emily Cain	19,003	100.0
Total votes		19,003	100

=== Independents ===
==== Withdrawn ====
- Mike Turcotte, adjunct professor at Eastern Maine Community College

==== Declined ====
- Troy Jackson, Democratic National Committee member, former state senator, candidate for the seat in 2014 (running for state senate)

=== General election ===
==== Debates ====
- Complete video of debate, October 19, 2016

==== Endorsements ====
Emily Cain (D)

U.S. senators

- George J. Mitchell, former U.S. Senate Majority Leader (D-ME)

U.S. representatives

- Nancy Pelosi, minority leader of the U.S. House of Representatives (D-CA)

Organizations

- EMILY's List
- Equality Maine

Newspapers

- Bangor Daily News
- MaineToday Media newspapers: Portland Press Herald, Kennebec Journal, Morning Sentinel

==== Polling ====
Poll source	Date(s) administered	Sample size	Margin of error	Emily Cain (D)	Bruce Poliquin (R)	Undecided
University of New Hampshire	October 20–25, 2016	341 LV	± 3.8%	43%	42%	11%
Normington Petts (D-Cain)	October 2–3, 2016	400 RV	± 4.9%	46%	45%	9%
University of New Hampshire	September 15–20, 2016	231 LV	± 6%	35%	45%	15%
SurveyUSA	September 4–10, 2016	397 LV	± 5%	45%	50%	6%
University of New Hampshire	June 15–21, 2016	227 LV	± 4.5%	40%	41%	12%

==== Predictions ====
Source	Ranking	As of
The Cook Political Report	Tossup	November 7, 2016
Daily Kos Elections	Tossup	November 7, 2016
Rothenberg	Tossup	November 3, 2016
Sabato's Crystal Ball	Lean D (flip)	November 7, 2016
RCP	Tossup	October 31, 2016

==== Results ====
Maine's 2nd congressional district, 2016
Party	Candidate	Votes	%
Republican	Bruce Poliquin (incumbent)	192,878	54.8
Democratic	Emily Cain	159,081	45.2
Independent	Jay Parker Dresser (write-in)	224	0.0
Total votes		352,183	100.0
Republican hold			
