= Elizabeth Hansen Shapiro =

American journalism academic

Elizabeth A. Hansen Shapiro is an American nonprofit executive and academic, known best for co-founding the National Trust for Local News and serving as its founding CEO from 2021 to 2025. She is also a senior research fellow at the Tow Center of Columbia Journalism School.

== Education and career ==
Elizabeth Hansen attended Swarthmore College, from which she graduated in 2002 with a B.A. degree in Latin. At Swarthmore, she wrote for The Phoenix. She later attended Harvard University, from which she received an M.A. in sociology in 2016, and a Ph.D. in organizational behavior from its business school in 2019. During her time at Harvard, she was a fellow of the Berkman Klein Center for Internet and Society from 2016 to 2017.

Hansen subsequently worked as a research fellow at the Shorenstein Center on Media, Politics and Public Policy of the Harvard Kennedy School. While at the Shorenstein Center in early 2020, Hansen co-wrote a commentary piece for the Nieman Journalism Lab, predicting that local newspapers would "run into a capital shortage" during the year. Hansen later began working with the Tow Center for Digital Journalism at the Columbia Graduate School of Journalism, where she is now a senior research fellow working on audience engagement and revenue strategies to assure a future for local journalism.

=== National Trust for Local News ===
In 2020, Hansen met repeatedly with Marc Hand, then the CEO of the Public Media Venture Group, and Steve Waldman, then-CEO of Report for America, to discuss the future of local news. An early idea by Hansen and Hand was to help "communities acquire news organizations using tax-exempt bonds". Fraser Nelson and Lillian Ruiz soon joined their conversations, and in 2021 the group founded the National Trust for Local News. Modeled after nature conservancies such as The Nature Conservancy that acquire land to conserve it for the long term, the National Trust for Local News was founded to acquire news outlets and turn them into financially sustainable nonprofits, warding off hedge funds that acquire news outlets and cut their resources to pursue profit. Hansen Shapiro became the founding CEO of the National Trust.

Under her leadership, the National Trust acquired a group of newspapers in Colorado, then expanded to Maine and Georgia in 2023 to purchase newspapers and establish subsidiary state trusts. According to the Poynter Institute, Hansen Shapiro's distinct style of "sav[ing] local news" by making investments instead of grants was developed based on research she conducted while in academia. In 2023, she said keys to her success were "shared decision making, governance, and ownership". By July 2024, Hansen Shapiro's organization had raised $38 million from philanthropic funders including the Knight Foundation, Google News Initiative, and Open Society Foundations. Speaking in a panel in 2025, Hansen Shapiro said she chose to work in nonprofit journalism because "an informed citizenry" is necessary for "a functioning democracy", and "profitability has been more important than service" to corporately owned news organizations.

By 2025, substantial decision-making at the Maine Trust for Local News, the largest of the state trusts, had been moved to the National Trust, and some staff members had consequently resigned. Hansen Shapiro stepped down as CEO in January 2025. In a subsequent LinkedIn post, she wrote that "the very principles that guided our work – trust in community wisdom, belief in the power of transformation, and faith in our shared stories – now guide me to make a transition". At the time, the National Trust claimed to be "largest nonprofit newspaper company in the country". During the interim period, the trust was led by an operating committee that included board chair Hand and board treasurer Keith Mestrich, with Hansen Shapiro as a strategic advisor. It was announced in April that Tom Wiley, president and publisher of The Buffalo News, would become the new CEO of the National Trust.

== Personal life ==
Elizabeth Hansen was named after her grandmother, Elizabeth "Betty" Hansen (née Morningstar), a columnist for the Saginaw Daily News of Saginaw, Michigan.

Hansen married Jake Shapiro in c. 2021, becoming Elizabeth Hansen Shapiro. As of 2024, Hansen Shapiro is a resident of Lexington, Massachusetts.
