= Question 4 =

Question 4 may refer to:

- 2016 Maine Question 4, An Act to Raise the Minimum Wage
- 2016 Massachusetts Question 4, the Massachusetts Legalization, Regulation and Taxation of Marijuana Initiative
- 2022 Maryland Question 4, a legislatively-referred initiative to legalize marijuana in Maryland
