= The Gables Inn =

Historic inn in Vermont, United States

- The inn in 2019
- Interactive map of the The Gables Inn area

General information
- Location: Stowe, Vermont, U.S., 1457 Mountain Road (Vermont Route 108)
- Coordinates: 44.472181292°N 72.705744°W
- Completed: 1840
- Opening: 1938 (as an inn)
- Closed: 2018
- Demolished: 2020 (6 years ago)

Technical details
- Floor count: 1.5

Other information
- Number of rooms: 18 (12 in main inn; 4 in Carriage House, 2 in the Riverview Suites)
- Number of suites: 1
- Number of restaurants: 1
- Parking: Yes

The Gables Inn was a historic inn in Stowe, Vermont, United States. Located on the Mountain Road, Vermont Route 108, it was built in 1840 and was converted into an inn in 1938. It was demolished in 2020, having closed two years earlier.

The main inn consisted of twelve bedrooms, while two annex buildings (the Carriage House and the Riverview Suites) contained four and two rooms, respectively. (In 1994, the New York Times stated the inn had nineteen rooms, not eighteen.)

The last proprietors of the inn were New York natives Randy Stern and Annette Monachelli, who purchased it in September 1999 from Sol, Lynn and Josh Baumrind. Shortly afterward, Stern posted an advert in the Stowe Reporter saying: "The leaves will change; The Gables will not." Stern became the chef for the inn's restaurant, which had been noted for its breakfasts, and Monachelli was the inn's hostess. Monachelli, a former attorney, died in 2013, of complications following a cerebral aneurysm she had around a week earlier. She was 47.

In 2019, Stern sold the inn to Eric and Robin Gershman and moved to Waterbury, Vermont. After consulting with an engineer, the Gershmans decided that the building's substandard condition meant it was more prudent to raze the structure rather than renovate it. As of 2022, the site of the inn remains vacant. The Carriage House, which was built by the Baumrinds adjacent to the inn to the northeast, is still in use, as are the Riverview Suites a short distance to the southwest, on Meadow Lane.
