= Worried Well =

US indie band

- Origin: Portland, Maine, U.S.
- Genres: Alternative rock, indie rock
- Years active: 2011–present
- Labels: Mint 400 Records
- Members: Daniel James; Cam Jones

Worried Well is an American indie rock band from Maine.

== History ==
Worried Well are an indie rock duo, consisting of Daniel James and Cam Jones from Portland, Maine that formed in 2011. That year, they released the "acoustic-heavy" self-titled album Worried Well. With "raucous and tense live performances" and playing with Murder By Death, mewithoutYou, the Hold Steady and Gin Blossoms led Worried Well to develop a following in the New England area. They received nominations for Best New Act and Best Rock-Pop Act in The Portland Phoenix. Their second album Luck was also released independently on 7 May 2013, considered by Emily Burnham of Bangor Daily News to be "smart" and "occasionally dour."

=== Mint 400 Records ===
After signing with Mint 400 Records in 2015, Worried Well released Great Appetite, Poor Taste on vinyl, compact disc and digital download. The album was recorded in Rumford and Portsmouth, New Hampshire, and was produced by Dean Baltulonis. The album content focuses on politics, religion and mental health. An acoustic rendition of their song "Look at the Stars" appears on the compilation album In a Mellow Tone.

In 2015 Worried Well performed at Bull Moose Music's Record Store Day, and handed out acoustic five-song EPs specifically made for Record Store Day.

== Members ==
- Daniel James – vocals and guitar (2011–present)
- Cam Jones – drums and vocals (2011–present)

== Discography ==
Albums

- Worried Well (2011)
- Luck (2013)
- Great Appetite, Poor Taste (2015)

Appearing on

- In a Mellow Tone (2015)
