= Journal Tribune =

Former newspaper of Biddeford, Maine, U.S.

Journal Tribune; Journal Tribune Weekender
- Type: Daily newspaper
- Owner: Masthead Maine
- Founded: January 5, 1884
- Ceased publication: 2019
- OCLC number: 36967626
- Website: www.journaltribune.com

The Journal Tribune (and its weekend edition, the Journal Tribune Weekender) was a daily newspaper published in Biddeford, Maine, United States, circulated throughout the greater York County, Maine region. Its first issue was on January 5, 1884, published as a four-page broadsheet.

== Weekend editions ==
The Journal Tribune Weekend's first issue was on August 8, 1988. (Note: The Saturday, July 30, 1988 issue was a normal issue of the Journal Tribune, and the Saturday, August 6 issue was published as the Journal Tribune Weekend.) It covered Saturdays and Sundays until it was renamed the York County Weekend for its first edition in 2005. (Note: The Friday, December 31, 2004 – Sunday, January 2, 2005 issue was published as the Journal Tribune Weekend, and the Saturday, January 8 – Sunday January 9, 2005 issue was published as the York County Weekend.) The weekend paper was later renamed back to the Journal Tribune Weekend in 2009, (Note: The Saturday, August 1 – Sunday, August 2, 2009 issue was published as the York County Weekend, though the Saturday, August 8 – Sunday, August 9 and Saturday, August 15 – Sunday, August 16 issues were published simply as the Journal Tribune. The Saturday, August 22 issue marked a return to the Journal Tribune Weekend name.) and two weeks covered Saturdays only, though returned to Saturday and Sunday coverage. (Note: The August 22 and August 29, 2009 issues were labeled for Saturday only, and the Saturday, September 5 – Sunday, September 6 issue was labeled for Saturday and Sunday.)

Journal Tribune Sunday's first issue was for Sunday, June 16, 2013. The Journal Tribune Weekend continued to be published on Saturdays, and continued to cover Sundays. (Note: Sundays began to be covered twice; for example there existed both a Saturday, June 15 – Sunday, June 16, 2013 Journal Tribune Weekend and a Sunday, June 16 Journal Tribune Sunday issue.)

The Sunday edition's last issue was on October 28, 2018, after which it became online-only. The weekend edition's name changed following this, with the first November issue being published as the Journal Tribune Weekender. (Note: The Saturday, October 27 – Sunday, October 28, 2018 issue was published as the Journal Tribune Weekend, and the Saturday, November 3 issue was published as the Journal Tribune Weekender.) This sparked another period of Saturday-only coverage by the Weekender, though issues in December returned to full-weekend coverage. (Note: The Saturday, November 24, 2018 issue covered only Saturday, but the following Saturday, December 1 – Sunday, December 2 issue covered both days.) The name change represented the new, longer weekend edition intended to make up for the lost Sunday edition.

== History ==
In January 2017, the newspaper announced they would no longer publish a print Monday edition, opting to enhance their online Monday edition instead.

=== MaineToday Media ===
Reade Brower, owner of MaineToday Media, acquired the Journal Tribune as well as Brunswick's The Times Record on April 1, 2018, from Sample News Group, which then acquired Brower's co-owned newspapers in Rutland and Barre–Montpelier, Vermont.

=== Closure ===
In 2019, the Journal Tribune was closed. The last articles on their website were posted September 26, 2019, and their last paper was published October 12. At the time of their closure, they published an edition for Tuesday through Saturday. Ed Pierce was the executive editor at the time of the paper's demise, though he already had plans to retire.
