= Morrisville News and Citizen =

Weekly newspaper in Vermont, US

News & Citizen
- Type: Weekly newspaper
- Format: Tabloid
- Owner: National Trust for Local News
- Publisher: Katerina Werth, Bryan Meszkat, Tommy Gardner and Bob Miller
- Editor: Tommy Gardner
- Founded: 1881
- Headquarters: 49 School St, Stowe, VT 05672 United States
- Circulation: 13,500 (as of 2023)
- ISSN: 2376-8371
- OCLC number: 9572968
- Website: vtcng.com/news_and_citizen

The News & Citizen is a weekly newspaper with a circulation of 13,500 based in the U.S. state of Vermont. It covers Lamoille County — the towns and villages of Morristown and Morrisville, Cambridge, Jeffersonville, Belvidere, Waterville, Johnson, Eden, Elmore, Hyde Park and Wolcott, plus Greensboro, Craftsbury and Hardwick, Vermont. It is owned by the National Trust for Local News.

== Early history ==
In 1881 the News and Citizen was created when the Vermont Citizen (Morrisville, 1873 - 1881) and the Lamoille News (Hyde Park, 1877-1881) were combined. L. Halsey Lewis (publisher until 1922) and Henry C. Fisk were responsible for the consolidation.

Arthur A. Twiss became owner, editor and manager of the News and Citizen (and the Lamoille Publishing Company) and after Lewis’ retirement in 1922.

Prior to this merge the Lamoille News had been created in 1877 by Orville S. Basford when the Lamoille Newsdealer's owner died and the subscriber list was purchased by the Vermont Citizen. Thus ensued a three year competition between the two papers until they decided to consolidate in 1881.

In 1942 Arthur B. Limoge purchased the News & Citizen. Clyde Limoge (Arthur’s son) became publisher in 1958, followed by Arthur’s grandson Bradley in 1973.

== Recent history ==
On Oct. 1, 2015, the Stowe Reporter LLC bought the two Morrisville-based publications on Oct. 1 from Bradley Limoge. A full-color, tabloid-sized News & Citizen launched in January 2016. The revamped newspaper was a merger of the current broadsheet-format News & Citizen and the free weekly, The Transcript.

Mickey Smith was editor of the paper from July 2015 until his death in early 2016. He had served as a reporter for 20+ years at the News and Citizen prior to his promotion. After Smith’s death Tom Kearney became the editor of the paper. In 2017, Hannah Marshall Normandeau became managing editor of the News & Citizen, Stowe Reporter and Waterbury Record. Kearney returned as editor in November 2019.

In January 2019, the company changed its name to the Vermont Community Newspaper Group and in September 2026, the company was acquired by the National Trust for Local News.
