= The Citizen (Vermont) =

Newspaper in Vermont, United States

The Citizen / Charlotte Citizen
- Type: Weekly Newspaper
- Owner: National Trust for Local News
- Publisher: Greg Popa
- Editor: Lisa Scagliotti
- Founded: 2006
- Headquarters: 233 Falls Road, Charlotte, VT 05482 United States
- Circulation: 4,500 (as of 2023)
- Website: http://www.thecitizenvt.com/

The Citizen is a weekly newspaper serving Charlotte, Vermont and Hinesburg, Vermont. It is published every Thursday and has a circulation of 4,500. It is owned by the National Trust for Local News.

== History ==
The newspaper was established in 2006 as the Charlotte Citizen, but changed its name to The Citizen in 2011 to accommodate its expansion into neighboring Hinesburg, Vermont.

The paper was part of Wind Ridge Publishing, owned by Holly Johnson. In 2015, Wind Ridge Publishing, which owned The Citizen and Shelburne News, moved its printing operations to Vermont.

In 2017, the Citizen was purchased by the Stowe Reporter Group, under publisher Greg Popa. In January 2019, the Stowe Reporter Group was renamed Vermont Community Newspaper Group. In September 2026, the company was acquired by the National Trust for Local News.
