= Question 3 =

Question 3 may refer to:

- 2016 Maine Question 3 or An Act to Require Background Checks for Gun Sales
- Massachusetts Question 3, 2012 or Massachusetts Medical Marijuana Initiative
- 2016 Massachusetts Question 3 or An Act to Prevent Cruelty to Farm Animals
- Question 3 (2018, Massachusetts) or Massachusetts Gender Identity Anti-Discrimination Initiative
