= Reade Brower =

American newspaper businessman

- Born: 1956 or 1957 (age 69–70)
- Spouse: Martha Brower (m. 1985)

Reade Francis Brower is a businessperson who owned most of the newspapers in Maine for nearly a decade in the 21st century. His company, MaineToday Media, was described by The Maine Monitor as a "near-monopoly". As of 2025, he owns three newspapers: The Ellsworth American (Ellsworth), The Mount Desert Islander (Bar Harbor), and the Midcoast Villager.

== Personal life ==
Brower grew up in Westborough, Massachusetts, with his adoptive parents Carmel and Richard. He attended the University of Massachusetts Amherst, and graduated in 1978 with a degree in marketing. As of 2018, he is married to Martha McSweeney Brower (née Martha McSweeney). They were married in 1985.

== Career ==
Before owning newspapers, Brower was an entrepreneur who started several companies, including an auto catalog and direct-mail company that advertised to 600,000 Maine households each week. In 1985, he founded The Free Press. In 2015, Brower bought MaineToday Media from financier S. Donald Sussman. He continued purchasing Maine newspapers; (Note: See MaineToday Media § Brower for an outline of some acquisitions.) in 2017, he owned 24 papers in Maine, including four of the state's seven daily newspapers. In 2018, he had acquired six of the seven daily papers in the state, the exception being the Bangor Daily News).

On March 30, 2023, he announced he was looking to sell or take on investors to Masthead Maine, the successor to MaineToday. On March 31, Bangor Daily News reported that he owned five dailies and 25 weeklies, and six specialty publications. He was 66 at the time. On July 10, 2023, Bangor Daily News reported that Brower had sold the five daily newspapers and 17 weeklies he owned to the nonprofit National Trust for Local News.

=== MaineStay Media ===
He owns six weeklies that he did not sell in 2023: The Ellsworth American (Ellsworth), The Mount Desert Islander (Bar Harbor), The Courier-Gazette (Rockland), The Republican Journal (Belfast), The Camden Herald (Camden), and The Free Press (Camden). Those six papers had united under the company MaineStay Media in 2022. Four of those newspapers (The Courier-Gazette, The Republican Journal, The Camden Herald and The Free Press) were combined in 2024 to form the Midcoast Villager.
