= The Forecaster =

Digital newspaper in Maine, U.S.

- 2023 cover page of The Northern Forecaster
- Type: Digital newspaper
- Owner: Maine Trust for Local News
- Founded: 1986 (as the Falmouth Forecaster)
- Language: English
- Headquarters: Falmouth, Maine, U.S.
- Website: PressHerald.com

The Forecaster is a regional newspaper in southern Maine that is published in a digital format. Originally published weekly and distributed for free, The Forecaster is now a digital paper available through the website of the Portland Press Herald.

== History ==
The Falmouth Forecaster was launched in Falmouth, Maine, in 1986, as the first of what became multiple editions of the Forecaster.

In 2012, The Forecaster announced a partnership with the Bangor Daily News in which they would collaborate on news-gathering and publish stories across the websites of both newspapers.

Formerly owned by MaineToday Media, the paper and its editions were sold to the Maine Trust for Local News in August 2023. In March 2025, the paper's owners announced all Forecaster papers would cease printing and become digital only. No reporting positions were cut during the process, which came during a series of layoffs within the Maine Trust.

Following the change, only two editions remain available on the PressHerald.com website: the Portland and Northern editions. The former webpage of The Southern Forecaster refers readers to the Scarborough Leader and South Portland Sentry (weekly papers operated by the trust's Mainely Media network), while The Coastal Journal Edition Forecaster now redirects readers to The Times Record for Midcoast Maine news. The remaining Forecasters are no longer free to read, as digital content by the Portland Press Herald requires a subscription to access.

== Editions ==
It published several different editions, collectively known as The Forecasters, including:

- The Portland Forecaster, covering the city of Portland;
- The Northern Forecaster, covering the towns north of Portland (Falmouth, Cumberland, North Yarmouth, Yarmouth, Freeport and Chebeague);
- The Southern Forecaster, covering the towns south of Portland (South Portland, Scarborough and Cape Elizabeth);
- and The Coastal Journal Edition Forecaster, covering towns farther east along the coast, including Brunswick, Topsham, Bath and Harpswell.

The Mid-Coast Forecaster was aimed at the same towns as what is now the Coastal Journal Edition, but was merged with the Coastal Journal in 2019 to form the Coastal Journal Edition Forecaster.

The Southern Forecaster and Coastal Journal Edition Forecaster were discontinued amid layoffs and cuts to editions of newspapers owned by the Maine Trust for Local News (see § History above).
