= The Colorado Sun =

Online news outlet based in Denver, Colorado, US

- Type: Digital daily newspaper
- Format: On-line
- Owner: Founding journalists
- Publisher: Larry Ryckman
- Editor: Dana Coffield
- Founded: 2018
- Language: English
- Headquarters: 2101 Arapahoe Street; Third Floor; Denver, CO 80205
- City: Denver
- Country: United States
- Website: coloradosun.com

The Colorado Sun is a nonprofit online news outlet based in Denver, Colorado. It launched on September 10, 2018, to provide long-form, in-depth coverage of news from all around Colorado.

It was started with two years of funding from blockchain venture capitalists at Civil and from a Kickstarter campaign. The operation is now funded by reader support, through memberships, and from sponsorship and grant revenue.

The Sun is an associate member of the Associated Press.

== History ==
Ten former employees of The Denver Post started The Colorado Sun in response to multiple layoffs following acquisition of the Post by the hedge fund, Alden Global Capital. None of the founders of The Sun were laid off from The Post. They left on their own volition.

The Colorado Sun was initially started with a combination of financial and technical support from Civil, a blockchain platform for news organizations to independently found and run newsrooms, and from a Kickstarter campaign that more than doubled its initial goals. This combination provided The Colorado Sun with two years of initial funding, and a subsequent grant from Wend Ventures in late 2018 provided two years of funding for educational reporting.

The newspaper accepts advertising, and is supported through a combination of memberships, sponsorships, grants and donations. While readers don't have to pay to access coloradosun.com, The Sun offers some newsletters, like The Unaffiliated, that are only accessible to paying members.

In May 2021, The Colorado Sun and nonprofit organization National Trust for Local News became joint owners of 24 local newspapers after acquiring them from the previous owners, Colorado Community Media.

In November 2023, The Colorado Sun announced it would donate its ownership shares of those papers to The Trust because it was in the process of converting from a for-profit public benefit corporation to a nonprofit.

== People ==
The Sun's publisher is Larry Ryckman. It's head editor is Dana Coffield.

The news outlet employs some of the most well-respected journalists in Colorado, including Jennifer Brown, who cover social issues; Jesse Paul, who covers politics; and Jason Blevins, who covers the outdoors industry.

== Newsletters ==
The Colorado Sun generates several newsletters:

- The Sunriser and The Headlines: five-day-a-week newsletters with top Colorado Sun and Colorado stories
- The Unaffiliated: weekly newsletter covering Colorado politics
- What's Working: weekly newsletter covering business and economic issues
- The Outsider: weekly newsletter covering Colorado outdoor recreation
- The Temperature: weekly newsletter covering Colorado health and climate news. The newsletter went on hiatus in 2026.
- Colorado Sunday: weekly newsletter covering Colorado news and arts and culture
- Mike Littwin: twice-weekly newsletter with commentary on Colorado politics
