= Donna Finley =

American politician

Donna W. Finley

Member of the Maine House of Representatives from the 85th District
- In office 2007–2008
- Preceded by: Maitland Richardson
- Succeeded by: Jeff McCabe

Donna W. Finley is an American politician from Maine. Finley, a Republican from Skowhegan, served for a single two-year term in the Maine House of Representatives (2007-2008). She was defeated for re-election by Democrat Jeff McCabe.
