= Evening Express (Portland, Maine) =

American newspaper

- The last front page of the Evening Express, printed February 1, 1991.
- Type: Daily newspaper
- Format: Broadsheet
- Owner: Guy Gannett Publishing Co.
- Publisher: Jean Gannett Hawley
- Editor: Louis A. Ureneck
- Founded: October 12, 1882, as Portland Evening Express
- Ceased publication: February 1, 1991
- Headquarters: 390 Congress Street, Portland, Maine 04101, United States
- Circulation: 22,700 daily in 1991

The Evening Express was an American daily evening broadsheet-format newspaper published in Portland, Maine. Founded in 1882, it was owned by Guy Gannett Publishing Co. from 1925 until 1991. As of February 1991, the Monday through Saturday average circulation was 22,700.

The Express's final issue appeared on February 1, 1991. The paper's demise left Portland as a one-newspaper town with the Portland Press Herald, a morning paper also owned by Guy Gannett. It remained so until the February 2009 launch of The Portland Daily Sun.

== History ==
=== First issue ===
The Evening Express's first issue was printed on Thursday, October 12, 1882, by Arthur Laughlin, who was 28 years old at the time. In the first issue, Laughlin proclaimed; "With this, the first number of the Portland Evening Express, we present to the public a new penny daily evening paper, whose aim will be to give all the local news of the day up to 3 o'clock P.M." By 1889, the Express boasted the highest daily circulation in the city.

=== Col. Frederick Neal Dow ===
In 1887, the Express was taken over by Col. Frederick Neal Dow, son of Portland Mayor Gen. Neal S. Dow. Dow oversaw numerous technical improvements to the paper and initiated an expansion that included the purchase of competing newspaper The Daily Advertiser in 1910. Dow also purchased the city's Sunday newspaper, the Maine Sunday Telegram, which is still published to this day. Dow sold the Evening Express and Maine Sunday Telegram to Guy P. Gannett in 1925.

=== The end ===
In fall 1990, Guy Gannett Publishing Co., under the leadership of heiress Jean Gannett Hawley, announced it would cease publication of the Evening Express the following February, citing the nationwide circulation decline of evening newspapers and its desire to merge the Express newsroom with that of the morning Portland Press Herald, which Guy Gannett also owned. The final issue of the Evening Express appeared Friday, February 1, 1991, with the headline "Goodbye", ending its 108-year run. The Maine Sunday Telegram continued under Guy Gannett ownership as the Sunday edition of the Portland Press Herald.

=== Aftermath ===
The Evening Express name returned in 2021 as an online newsletter for Maine Trust for Local News newspapers, sent at 6 PM eastern Monday through Friday.

== See also ==
- Newspaper Preservation Act of 1970
- List of defunct newspapers of the United States
- Guy Gannett Publishing Co.
- Portland Press Herald and Maine Sunday Telegram
