= Guy Gannett Communications =

American media company

- Industry: Newspapers and television stations
- Founded: 1921
- Defunct: April 30, 1999; 27 years ago
- Fate: Dissolved
- Successor: Ackerley Group; Blethen Maine Newspapers / MaineToday Media; Sinclair Broadcast Group
- Headquarters: Portland, Maine, United States
- Key people: Guy P. Gannett; (founder); Madeleine G. Corson; (chairman); James B. Shaffer; (president, CEO)
- Products: Three daily newspapers in Maine and seven television stations in the eastern United States
- Number of employees: 1998: 1,400

Guy Gannett Communications was a family-owned business consisting of newspapers in Maine and a handful of television stations in the eastern United States. The company was founded by its namesake, Guy P. Gannett, in 1921, and was managed by a family trust from 1954 to 1998, when it sold most of its properties to The Seattle Times Company and Sinclair Broadcast Group. At the time of its sale, the company owned three daily newspapers and seven television stations.

== History ==
William Howard Gannett, of Augusta, Maine, first published Comfort magazine in 1888—an eight-page advertisement for a patent medicine—but it was his son, Guy Patterson Gannett, who headed the push into daily journalism. After a stint helping with the magazine after leaving Yale University in 1901, the junior Gannett went into local politics. By 1920, he was a prominent citizen in Augusta, Maine. Two daily newspaper owners representing the Portland Herald and the Portland Daily Press approached him and asked him to buy them out. Gannett invested in both companies.

In 1921, he completed his purchase of the two Portland papers, merging them into one Portland Press Herald, and also bought the Waterville Morning Sentinel in Waterville, Maine. In 1925 he added, for US$550,000, the Portland Evening Express and Daily Advertiser and Portland Sunday Telegram. Four years later, Guy Gannett Publishing Co. tacked on the Kennebec Journal in Augusta.

At first, the company expanded beyond newspapers with WGAN radio (1938) and television (1954) stations in Portland only (WGAN-TV was renamed WGME in 1983). In 1967, Guy Gannett Communications began to buy television properties outside Maine.

On February 1, 1991, succumbing to industry-wide declines in revenues at afternoon newspapers, Guy Gannett Communications closed the Evening Express and merged it with the Portland Press Herald. Daily circulation of the Express was given at 22,000 to 23,000.

== Sales ==
In 1998, the family trust decided to sell the company, leading to worries among some, such as Press Herald managing editor Curt Hazlett, that the Guy Gannett papers could lose the qualities he associated with family-owned journalism:

This place has been committed to quality, which means we're a little fat on the news side. That's a price this company has been willing to pay because we cover the community pretty well. The question is whether someone coming in from the outside will be willing to do that.

Although they entertained offers from Journal Register Company and MediaNews Group, which had strong properties in nearby Massachusetts, Guy Gannett's managers decided to sell their newspapers to The Seattle Times Company, which had previously operated only within the state of Washington. Seattle Times, run by the fourth generation of the Blethen family, which had its roots in Maine, won out because of shared values.

Blethen said he had developed "a real emotional connection" to the Maine papers after making several "family pilgrimages" to the home of his ancestor, Col. Alden Blethen, who had been a schoolteacher and lawyer in Maine before purchasing The Seattle Press-Times in 1896. The Kennebec Journal, Maine Sunday Telegram, Morning Sentinel and Portland Press Herald, along with associated weeklies, were reorganized as Blethen Maine Newspapers, an independent division of The Seattle Times Company. The price of the deal was not disclosed publicly but was later estimated at $213 million, based on company documents.

A week after the Blethen sale, Guy Gannett unloaded most of its television stations in a $310 million deal with Sinclair Broadcast Group.

== Properties ==
At the time of its sale in 1998, Guy Gannett Communications consisted of three daily newspapers in Maine, a few related publishing products, and seven television stations.

The newspapers and related companies were sold to The Seattle Times Company and reorganized as a subsidiary company, Blethen Maine Newspapers; the newspaper chain would be sold to new owners in 2009, becoming MaineToday Media. Six of the television stations were sold to Sinclair Broadcast Group; WOKR was sold to Ackerley Group, later to be purchased by Deerfield Media, which is operated by Sinclair through a LMA.

=== Former stations ===
- Stations are arranged in alphabetical order by state and city of license.
- Two boldface asterisks appearing following a station's callsign (**) indicate a station built and signed on by Guy Gannett.

Stations owned by Guy Gannett Communications
Media market	State	Station	Purchased	Sold	Notes
Tallahassee	Florida	WTWC-TV	1996	1998	
Springfield–Decatur	Illinois	WICS	1986	1998	
Champaign–Urbana	Illinois	WICD	1994	1998	(Note: Semi-satellite of WICS.)
Cedar Rapids	Iowa	KGAN	1981	1998	(Note: Acquired as a divestiture from Cosmos Broadcasting's acquisition from Orion Broadcasting.)
Portland	Maine	WGME-TV**	1954	1998	(Note: Known as WGAN-TV from 1954 to 1983.)
Springfield	Massachusetts	WGGB-TV	1967	1998	(Note: Known as WHYN-TV prior to 1979.)
Rochester	New York	WOKR	1995	1998	
