= Vermont Community Newspaper Group =

Media company and publisher of five weekly newspapers in Vermont

- Founded: 2019
- Headquarters location: 782 Mountain Road, Springer-Miller Complex, 2nd Floor, Suite T, Stowe, VT 05672 United States
- Official website: https://www.vtcng.com/

The Vermont Community Newspaper Group was a media company and publisher of five weekly newspapers and multiple magazines in the U.S. state of Vermont. In September 2026, the company was acquired by the National Trust for Local News.

== Newspapers ==
The Vermont Community Newspaper Group publishes five weekly newspapers:

- Stowe Reporter, covering the Stowe area since 1958
- The News and Citizen, covering the Morrisville area since 1881
- The Citizen, covering Charlotte and Hinesburg since 2006
- Shelburne News, covering Shelburne since 1967
- The Other Paper, covering South Burlington since 1977

All five newspapers operate websites with updated news throughout the week.

From 2007 until March 2020, the group also published the Waterbury Record.

== Magazines ==
The company publishes multiple magazines:

- Stowe Guide and Magazine, twice-yearly
- Stowe Weddings
- Green Mountain Weddings
- Table

== History ==
After owning the Stowe Reporter for 17 years, publisher Biddle Duke sold a majority stake in December 2014 to Bob Miller of New York and Norb Garret of California. Greg Popa replaced Duke as publisher. On Oct. 1, 2015, the Stowe Reporter bought the Morrisville News and Citizen. In May 2017, they bought the Shelburne News, a weekly covering Shelburne, Vermont, and The Citizen, a weekly covering the towns of Charlotte and Hinesburg, Vermont.

In January 2019, the company had grown to include six weekly community newspapers and changed its name to the Vermont Community Newspaper Group.

On March 26, 2020, the company announced that the Waterbury Record was suspending publication after 13 years.

In July 2020, the company laid off three of its nine editorial employees, including Tom Kearney who had served as managing editor. Additional positions were also eliminated.

At the end of 2024, Greg Popa retired as publisher and editor after having worked at VCNG and its earlier organizations for nearly 40 years. Tommy Gardner replaced Popa as editor for the five community weekly newspapers.

In November 2025, the company was awarded a $5,000 grant from the Vermont Community Foundation as part of its new Local Civic Journalism Awards.

In September 2026, the company was acquired by the National Trust for Local News. The announcement indicated that all staff would remain employed and the newspapers would continue to be published from the office in Stowe, Vermont.
