= Shelburne News =

Newspaper based in Vermont, US

- Type: Weekly newspaper
- Owner: National Trust for Local News
- Editor: Tommy Gardner
- Founded: 1967
- Headquarters: 1340 Williston Road, South Burlington, VT
- Circulation: 5,000 (as of 2023)
- Website: vtcng.com/shelburnenews

The Shelburne News is an American newspaper serving the town of Shelburne, Vermont. The paper has a circulation of 4,500-5,000. It is a free, weekly paper mailed for free to residents and businesses in Shelburne and distributed on racks in parts of the town. The paper is owned by the National Trust for Local News.

== History ==
The paper was first published in 1967. It originated out of conversations among the members of Shelburne’s League of Women Voters about the need to distribute information about who was running for office. A group of women led by Roz Graham took what was originally a newsletter and turned it into a paper.

In 2017, Holly Johnson sold the Shelburne News to Bob Miller and Norb Garrett, owners of the Stowe Reporter, Waterbury Record, News & Citizen, and the Citizen. In January 2019, the owners renamed the company to Vermont Community Newspaper Group. In September 2026, the company was acquired by the National Trust for Local News.
