= The Weekly Packet =

Newspaper published in Blue Hill, Maine, USA

- Type: Weekly newspaper
- Format: Broadsheet
- Owner: Penobscot Bay Press
- Publisher: Nat Barrows
- Editor: Nat Barrows
- Founded: 1960
- Headquarters: Blue Hill, Maine
- Circulation: 2,200
- Website: weeklypacket.com

The Weekly Packet is a weekly newspaper serving Maine's Blue Hill, Brooklin, Brooksville, Sedgwick, and Surry communities. It was founded by Jerry Durnbaugh, an Indiana transplant to Maine, in 1960, and later purchased by Nat Barrows of Penobscot Bay Press in 1981. It claims a circulation of 2,200 copies, and is published by Penobscot Bay Press which publishes a number of other area papers under a single editor.
