= The Ellsworth American =

Local weekly newspaper covering Hancock County, Maine

- Type: Weekly newspaper
- Format: Broadsheet
- Owner: Reade Brower
- Founder(s): Elijah Couillard and W.B. Hilton
- Managing editor: Cyndi Wood
- Founded: October 17, 1851; 175 years ago
- Language: English
- Headquarters: 1 Printing House Square, Ellsworth, Maine 04605; United States
- Circulation: 10,355 (as of 2012)
- Sister newspapers: The Mount Desert Islander; Midcoast Villager
- ISSN: 1541-6720
- OCLC number: 10378660
- Website: ellsworthamerican.com

The Ellsworth American is a local weekly newspaper covering Hancock County, Maine.

== Overview ==
The Ellsworth American is a locally owned and managed weekly newspaper serving Hancock County, Maine. Publication began Oct. 17, 1851, making The American the oldest newspaper in Hancock County and the second oldest in Maine. Newspaper publishing in Ellsworth began in 1826 with the Independent Courier, which was the first of roughly five papers with various political bents that existed for short periods until 1851. The newspaper has won numerous awards and distinctions from state, New England and national newspaper associations in recognition of news coverage, photography, editorial pages, advertising layouts and general excellence. The paper has received numerous awards from the Maine Press Association and New England Newspaper & Press Association.

== Awards and recognition ==
The Ellsworth American has received the coveted National Newspaper Association General Excellence Award, placing second in the competition. Its sister paper The Mount Desert Islander won a first place award for public notice advertising in the National Newspaper Association Better Newspaper Advertising Contest.

== Publication ==
The newspaper, which has a Thursday dateline, is printed each Wednesday afternoon and is available on newsstands throughout Hancock and western Washington counties and the Bangor/Brewer area of Penobscot County. Print subscriptions are mailed nationwide and fully searchable digital subscriptions have been available since 2009. The American's website, ellsworthamerican.com, is updated daily.

== Staff ==
The Ellsworth American and its sister paper The Mount Desert Islander in 2012 employed a combined staff of 55. Departments include news, advertising, internet, circulation, administration, accounting, creative services and the press and mail room. The administrative staff includes General Manager Kathy Cook and Managing Editor Cyndi Wood.

== History ==
The Ellsworth American began as The Ellsworth Herald on Oct. 17, 1851. It was founded by Bangor men Elijah Couillard and W.B. Hilton. The name was changed to Ellsworth American in 1855 and modified to The Ellsworth American in 1864.

Couillard sold the press to W.H. Chaney in December 1854, who renamed the paper the American and published between January and December 1855, when Chaney sold it to N.K. Sawyer. Sawyer expanded the size from 20 x 17" (four pages, six columns) to 27 x 20" (four pages, eight columns) and ran it until 1872. During the 1870s and 1880s, it belonged to the Hancock County Publishing Company and was edited by Arthur F. Drinkwater, E.P. Sampson (very briefly), H.C. Vaughan, and J.C. Chilcott.

Ellsworth native Donald Stuart was the next to run the American, and he was with the paper 24 years before he died in 1959. Another local man, Hale Joy, ran the paper while it technically belonged to Stuart's young son.

James Russell Wiggins, former editor of The Washington Post and briefly U.S. ambassador to the United Nations, spent more than 30 years as editor of the paper. Wiggins transformed the small-town weekly into an award-winning and nationally recognized publication. Upon retiring as ambassador, Wiggins took over operations in 1969. Wiggins modernized the paper with offset printing and expanded office space, and lengthened each issue to 24-32 pages. He was editor until his death in 2000. His poems still are published on The American's editorial page. Wiggins also wrote a weekly column titled "The Fenceviewer" commemorating the title of officials elected in early New England towns to settle boundary disputes between neighbors. In January 1991, Wiggins sold the paper to Alan Baker, who had joined The American staff in 1986.

In 2011, Baker was awarded the National Newspaper Association's James O. Amos Award, recognizing an industry executive who has shown community leadership and distinguished journalism service. The James O. Amos Award is recognized as one of the highest and most dignified tributes in community journalism. Baker was also inducted into the Maine Press Association Hall of Fame in October 2017.

The American's sister paper, The Mount Desert Islander in Bar Harbor, was founded in 2001.

The American's 160th anniversary in 2011 was commemorated at the state capitol. The Senate passed a legislative sentiment honoring The American as a locally owned and managed paper and the second oldest weekly newspaper in Maine. "With today's trend of media consolidation, having a hometown newspaper like The Ellsworth American remain under local ownership and control is rare and wonderful," state Sen. Brian Langley (R-Hancock County) said at the time.

In 2018, Baker sold The American and Islander to Reade Brower.

In 2025, the paper shuttered it's printing press in Ellsworth and eliminated 10 full-time and part-time jobs.
