= Midcoast Villager =

American regional newspaper

- Type: Weekly newspaper
- Owner: Reade Brower
- Publisher: Aaron Britt
- Editor-in-chief: Willy Blackmore
- Deputy editor: Alex Seitz-Wald
- Founded: September 2024; 20 months ago
- Language: English
- Headquarters: 16 Tannery Lane; Camden, Maine 04843
- Country: United States
- Circulation: 5,000 (as of October 2025)
- Sister newspapers: The Ellsworth American; Mount Desert Islander
- OCLC number: 1459706380
- Website: midcoastvillager.com

The Midcoast Villager is a regional weekly newspaper covering Knox and Waldo counties in Maine. It was established in September 2024 following the merger of five news publications based in Camden, Rockland, and Belfast, Maine.

== Overview ==
The Midcoast Villager is a regional weekly print and online newspaper headquartered in Camden, Maine and covering the Midcoast region of the state. As of October 2025, the Villager had a circulation of about 5,000.

The Villager's offices are located in a converted mill building in downtown Camden. Below is the Villager Café, a sister business to the Villager that opened in April 2025 and functions as a café, newsstand, community events and meeting space, and staff canteen. The café hosts a weekly event with Villager reporters to discuss the week's news and their reporting process, as well as a regular "Silent Reading Club" and other events.

The Villager has sought to offset a decline in local news by diversifying funding, earning revenue through the publication via subscriptions, advertising, and grants; the café; and other activities such as hosting writers' retreats. The newspaper's leadership has stated that its editorial approach emphasizes community engagement and solutions journalism. The paper also partners with a local artificial intelligence company, Civic Sunlight, which transcribes and summarizes local public meetings for the Villager's reporters, who use them to identify newsworthy topics.

The Villager is part of Islandport Media, which also operates the Villager Café, Maine newspapers The Ellsworth American and the Mount Desert Islander, and the book publisher Islandport Press. Islandport Media is owned by Reade Brower and managing partner Kathleen Fleury Capetta, who was previously editor-in-chief of Down East magazine.

== History ==
In September 2024, Rockland's The Courier-Gazette, Camden's Free Press and Camden Herald, Belfast's The Republican Journal, and the online news site VillageSoup merged to create the Midcoast Villager. Three of the newspapers were more than 100 years old. According to journalism professor Dan Kennedy, VillageSoup, created in 1996, was "one of the very first online-only hyperlocal news outlets". Despite occurring amid widespread local newspaper closures, the merger was not structured as a cost-reduction effort. All existing staff were retained, and additional employees were hired, including six additional journalists.

In October 2024, the Villager was awarded a two-year, $200,000 grant from Press Forward, a national group aiming to support local news. In 2025, the newspaper won the General Excellence in print award by the Maine Press Association.

In April 2026, three staff took buyouts and another three were laid off. The cuts included the paper's managing editor Christine Simmonds, two copy editors and three sales and advertising dept. workers. This left the paper with a staff of 29, four more than before the merger.

== Staff ==
As of October 2025, the Midcoast Villager employed 29 people, many of whom had worked for the newspaper's local predecessors. Its editor-in-chief is Willy Blackmore, who previously worked for a digital media start-up and as a senior editor for Curbed, a real estate and urban design blog website published by New York magazine. The newspaper's deputy editor, Alex Seitz-Wald, worked for about ten years as a politics journalist for NBC News. Publisher Aaron Britt was previously the editor for the architecture and design magazine Dwell. Among its staff reporters are Dan Dunkle, and Stephen Betts.
