= The County =

2019 film

- Film poster
- Directed by: Grímur Hákonarson
- Starring: Arndís Hrönn Egilsdóttir
- Release date: 14 August 2019
- Running time: 92 minutes
- Country: Iceland
- Language: Icelandic

The County (Icelandic: Héraðið) is a 2019 Icelandic melodrama directed by Grímur Hákonarson. It was screened in the Contemporary World Cinema section at the 2019 Toronto International Film Festival.

== Cast ==
- Arndís Hrönn Egilsdóttir as Inga
- Þorsteinn Bachmann as Oddur Policeman
- Þorsteinn Gunnar Bjarnason as Gummi the Painter
- Daniel Hans Erlendsson as Heiðar
- Hafdís Helga Helgadóttir as Katla T.V. Reporter

== Reception ==
Review aggregator Rotten Tomatoes gives the film an 85% approval rating based on 46 reviews, with an average rating of 6.7/10. The site's critical consensus reads, "Led by Arndís Hrönn Egilsdóttir's remarkable work in the starring role, The County is a David vs. Goliath story that speaks rousing truth to power." The Guardian gave the film a 4/5 star rating calling it a "stirring drama" in their pick of the week feature.
