= Stowe Reporter =

Newspaper published in Vermont, US

- Type: Weekly newspaper
- Format: Tabloid
- Owner: National Trust for Local News
- Publisher: Katerina Werth, Tommy Gardner and Bryan Meszkat
- Founded: 1958
- Headquarters: Stowe, Vermont, United States
- Circulation: 4,500 (as of 2023)
- OCLC number: 38271178
- Website: vtcng.com/stowe_reporter

The Stowe Reporter is a newspaper based inVermont, United States, which is published once a week on Thursdays. It serves greater the Mt. Mansfield area, including Stowe, Waterbury, Morrisville, Hyde Park, and across Lamoille County, Vermont. It is owned by the National Trust for Local News.

== History ==
The Stowe Reporter was founded in 1958 by Dorre Hanna and Martha Ball.

It was purchased by Trow Elliman, Alex Nimick, Russ Spring, and Mary and Bob Bourdon two years later, in 1960. Elliman bought out his partners in 1965. He remained publisher of the paper until 1998.

In May 1998, the paper was bought by A.B. "Biddle" Duke. Duke was the son of Angier Biddle Duke and Robin Chandler Duke. In 2007, Duke spun off another paper, the Waterbury Record. Duke stepped down as publisher in 2014.

In 2015, Duke sold his majority share in the paper to Bob Miller and Greg Popa became publisher of the paper.

Since 2015, the Stowe Reporter has added more local newspapers to its group, including the Shelburne News, The Citizen, serving Hinesburg and Charlotte, South Burlington's The Other Paper, and the News & Citizen of Morrisville.

In January 2019, the company changed its name to the Vermont Community Newspaper Group.

In September 2026, the Vermont Community Newspaper Group was acquired by the National Trust for Local News.

== Awards ==
=== New England Better Newspaper Competition - New England Newspaper and Press Association ===
Year	Award	Place	Recipient
2017	Arts and Entertainment Reporting, Weekly Newspapers (circ. <6,000)	2nd	Caleigh Cross
2017	Local Personality Profile, Weekly Newspapers (circ. <6,000)	1st	Andrew Martin
2017	Obituaries	3rd	Caleigh Cross
2017	Sports Story, Weekly Newspapers	3rd	Tommy Gardner
2017	Food Page or Section	3rd	Stowe Reporter
2017	Living Page or Section	2nd	Stowe Reporter
2017	Best Niche Publication	1st, 3rd	Stowe Reporter
2017	Special Sports Section, Weekly Newspapers	1st	Stowe Reporter
2015	Arts and Entertainment Reporting, Weekly Newspapers (circ. <6,000)	2nd	Tom Kearney
2015	General Excellence, Weekly Newspapers (circ. <6,000)	1st	Stowe Reporter
2015	Photography, Weekly Newspapers (circ. <6,000)	1st	Glenn Callahan
2015	Health Reporting, Weekly Newspapers (circ. <6,000)	3rd	Tommy Gardner
2015	Overall Designand Presentation of a Niche Product	3rd	Kimberly Whalen
2015	Special Sports Section	1st	Stowe Reporter
2015	Transportation Reporting, Weekly Newspapers (circ. <6,000)	1st	Tommy Gardner
2015	Food Page or Section, Weekly Newspapers	1st	Stowe Reporter
2013	Business / Economic Reporting, Weekly Newspapers (circ. <6,000)	3rd	Nathan Burgess
2013	Crime and Courts Reporting	2nd	Lisa McCormack
2013	Local Personality Profile, Weekly Newspapers (circ. <6,000)	1st	Lisa McCormack
2013	Food Page or Section, Weekly Newspapers	2nd	Kim Whalen
2013	Living Page or Section, Weekly Newspapers (circ. <6,000)	1st	Kim Whalen
2013	Editorial Writing, Weekly Newspapers (circ. <6,000)	2nd	Biddle Duke
2013	Personality Photo, Weekly Newspapers (circ. <6,000)	1st	Glenn Callahan
2013	Pictorial Photo, Weekly Newspapers (circ. <6,000)	3rd	Glenn Callahan
2013	Sports Photo, Weekly Newspapers (circ. <6,000)	3rd	Glenn Callahan
2013	Spot News Photo, Weekly Newspapers (circ. <6,000)	3rd	Glenn Callahan

=== Vermont Press Association ===
Year	Award	Place	Recipient
2009	General Excellence (non-daily)	2nd	Stowe Reporter
2009	Outstanding Website (non-daily)	3rd	Stowe Reporter
2009	Rookie of the Year	-	Jesse Roman
2007	General Excellence (non-daily)	2nd	Stowe Reporter
2007	Best Local Story (non-daily)	2nd	Scott Monroe
2007	Photo—Sports (non-daily)	3rd	Glenn Callahan
2007	Photo—General news (non-daily)	2nd	Glenn Callahan
2006	General Excellence (non-daily)	2nd	Stowe Reporter
2005	General Excellence (non-daily)	2nd	Stowe Reporter
2005	John D. Donoghue Award for Arts Criticism	2nd	Marina Gisquet
2005	Photo—Sports (non-daily)	1st	Glenn Callahan
2005	Photo—General news (non-daily)	1st	Glenn Callahan
2004	General Excellence (non-daily)	1st	Stowe Reporter
2004	Sports Writing (non-daily)	2nd	Pete Hartt
2003	Rookie of the Year	-	Ethan Dezotelle
2003	Sportwriting (non-daily)	2nd	Michael Schaefer
2003	Best Local Story (non-daily)	2nd	John Zicconi
2003	Best Local Story (non-daily)	3rd	Ethan Dezotelle
2003	Photo—Sports (non-daily)	2nd	Glenn Callahan
2003	Photo—Feature (non-daily)	3rd	Glenn Callahan
2002	Sports Writing (non-daily)	1st	Pete Hartt
2002	Photo—General news (daily)	3rd	Glenn Callahan
2002	Photo—General news (non-daily)	3rd	Glenn Callahan
2000	Best Local Story (non-daily)	2nd	John Zicconi
2000	Feature Writing (non-daily)	2nd	Pete Hartt
2000	Best Editorial (daily & non-daily)	3rd (tied)	Biddle Duke
2000	Photo—Sports (non-daily)	2nd	Glenn Callahan
1999	Editorials (daily & non-daily)	2nd	Greg Popa
1999	Best Local Story (non-daily)	3rd	John Zicconi
1999	Sports Writing (non-daily)	2nd	Pete Hartt

=== Vermont Ski & Snowboard Museum ===
Year	Award	Recipient
2014	Paul Robbins Journalism Award	Bill Collom for race reports published in Stowe Reporter
2012	Paul Robbins Journalism Award	Linda Adams and Sporty Bell
2012	Hall of Fame Induction	Trow Elliman
