= The Times Record (Maine) =

Newspaper published in Brunswick, Maine, United States

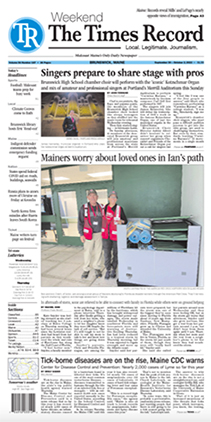
- The 1 October 2022, front page of The Times Record
- Type: Weekly newspaper
- Format: Broadsheet
- Owner: Maine Trust for Local News (2023–present)
- Founded: February 6, 1967
- Language: English
- Headquarters: 3 Business Parkway; Brunswick, Maine, U.S.
- Circulation: 11,500 (as of 2007)
- Sister newspapers: Portland Press Herald; Sun Journal; The Forecaster
- ISSN: 0747-1300
- OCLC number: 10561177
- Website: timesrecord.com

The Times Record is an independently-owned weekly newspaper published on Fridays that local news in Bath and Brunswick, Maine. Operating out of Brunswick, it was founded in 1967 as a result of a merger between two historic newspapers, the Brunswick Record and the Bath Daily Times. It is owned by the Maine Trust for Local News.

== History ==
The first publication of The Times Record was published in 1967. The newspaper was a merger of the Brunswick Record, with a print circulation of 7,500 daily papers, and the Bath Daily Times, with a daily circulation of 3,500, for a total of 11,000 daily customers. The Brunswick Record was first published in November 1902 and the Bath Daily Times begun in 1869.

The Bath Daily Times can be traced back to the year 1820. Up until the 1890s, they had many name changes and mergers dating back to that time.

In 1897 Frank B. Nichols bought the paper, and kept its name, and it stayed in the family until the merger in 1967. Nichols began publishing a page of Brunswick news in the Bath Independent, a weekly companion to the Bath Daily Times.

In 1902, due to the success of his entries in the Bath publication, Nichols started a new paper, the Brunswick Record. In the following 60 years, Nichols oversaw the operations of the Bath Daily Times and his son-in-law, Paul Niven, managed the Brunswick Record.

After Nichols died, Niven's brother, Cam Niven, took over the Bath Daily Times. On February 6, 1967, the two papers merged and became The Times Record.

The Times Record started out as an afternoon daily newspaper, delivering Monday through Fridays, and was first called the Bath-Brunswick Times Record. There competition, The Portland Press Herald (later to become a sister organization), delivered in the mornings and they didn't want to compete with their large circulation numbers.

=== Sample News Group ===
In 2007, The Times Record was bought by Sample News Group, an organization that owned the Journal Tribune in Biddeford, Maine, as well as a string of papers in Pennsylvania. Douglas Niven, of the original Niven family, remained on the board of directors and Chris Miles, a partner at Sample News Group took over day-to-day operations. During the 2008 Great Recession many newspapers went out of business or were bought out by bigger corporations. That year, the new company asked the State of Maine for a bond to purchase the publishing company that The Times Record used for printing their papers, Alliance Press.

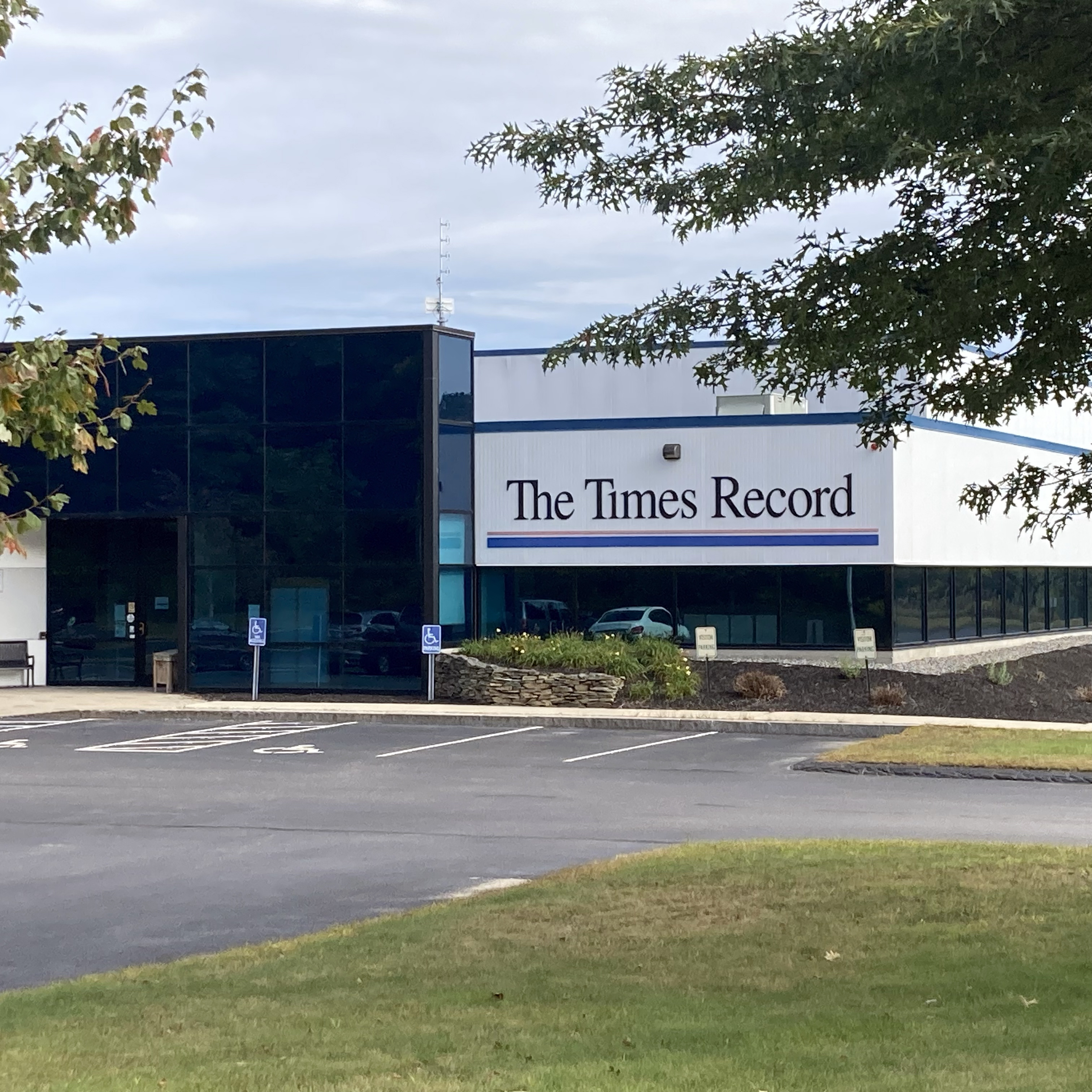
The Times Record building ca. 2022

=== RFB Enterprises ===
When it was part of MaineToday Media (MTM), the publication was an affiliate of the state's largest news-gathering organization, RFB Enterprises, which included newspapers such as the Portland Press Herald.

Until sold as a whole on April 1, 2018, The Times Record had sold its printing division, Alliance Press, to Reade Brower under the name RFB Enterprises out of Rockland, Maine, and moved the presses to a new building at 3 Business Parkway, in Brunswick; as part of the restructuring, past-due property taxes were paid off.

In 2019, Alliance Press moved out of its Brunswick facility and merged with MTM's new printing press in South Portland, Maine. Brower has consolidated six of Maine's seven daily newspapers, as well as 21 weekly newspapers, under his ownership.

=== Maine Trust for Local News ===
In August 2023, The Times Record was one of Reade Brower's publications sold to a non-profit newspaper group, Maine Trust for Local News. In March 2025, the owners announced the Times Record will reduce its weekly print schedule from a twice to once a week. Moving forward, the paper will only be published on Fridays.

== Online ==
During the beginning years of the Internet, newspapers such as The Times Record placed their articles online for free. This led in a decline in newspaper sales. After the recession of 2008, the paper closed its Bath location. In the preceding years, when RFB Enterprises purchased the company, the paper's website was transferred to the Portland Press Herald's online pay service.

On March 1, 2021, The Times Record stopped producing physical newspapers on Mondays, having at this time, four daily papers delivered Tuesday through Fridays, with online editions Monday through Friday.

== Editorial policy ==
The MaineToday editorial board announced (via centralmaine.com) in their August 31, 2014, editorial that they would no longer endorse candidates for political office, citing a desire to avoid appearing partisan. They stated that they would continue to take positions on referendums, people's veto, and bond questions.
