= Jeff McCabe =

American politician

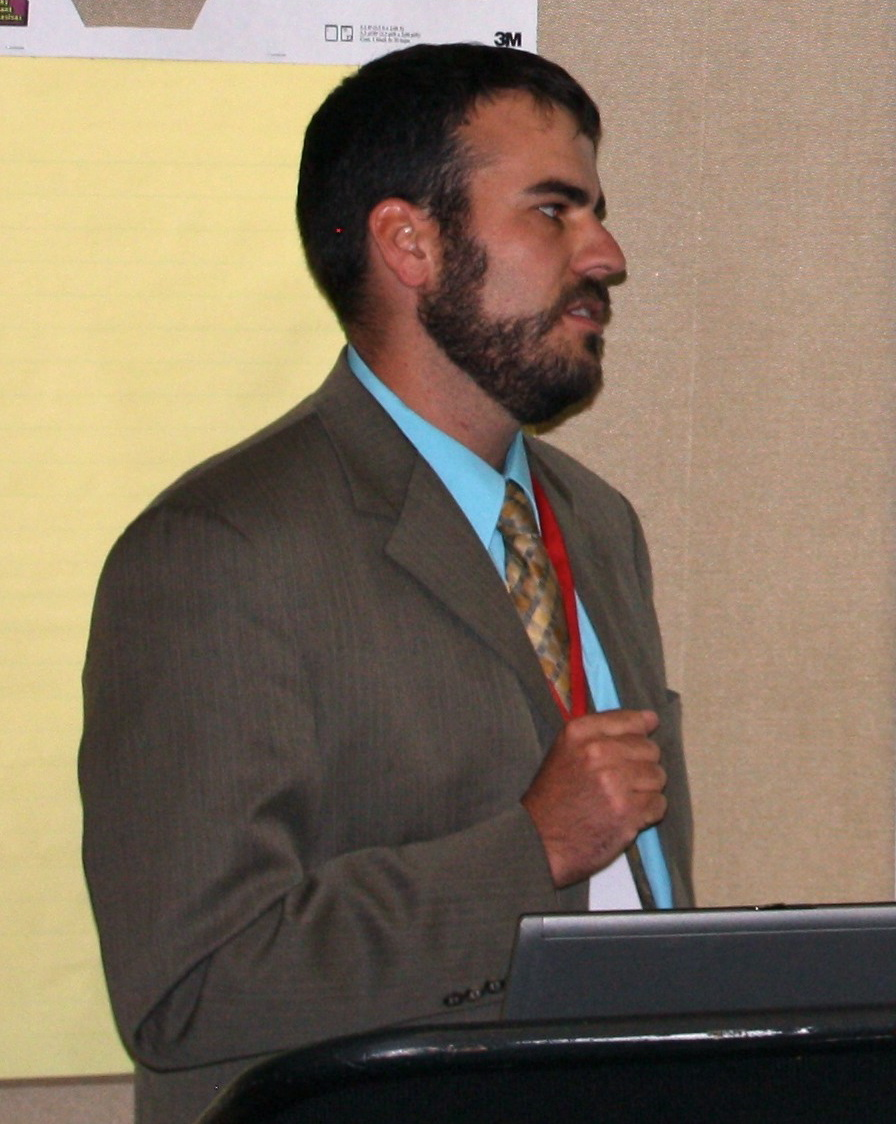
- McCabe in 2012

Member of the Maine House of Representatives from the 85th District
- In office December 3, 2008 – December 2016
- Preceded by: Donna Finley
- Succeeded by: Betty A. Austin

Personal details
- Party: Democratic
- Children: 3
- Education: Unity College (B.S.)

Jeffrey M. McCabe is an American politician who is a former member of the Maine House of Representatives. He is a member of the Democratic Party, and served as Majority Leader from 2014 until 2016.

== Career ==
McCabe was first elected to the State House in 2008, defeating incumbent Donna Finley. He has served on the Agriculture, Conservation, and Forestry Committee.

In addition to his political career, McCabe works as a Maine Guide and serves as Director of Lake George Regional Park, a park located in the towns of Skowhegan and Canaan. He has formerly served as Executive Director of the Somerset County Soil and Water Conservation District.

In 2023, he became the deputy director of the Maine Office of Outdoor Recreation, a positions that gives him the power to assist in communication and stakeholder engagement.

== Personal life ==
McCabe graduated from Unity College with a Bachelor of Science in environmental education. He lives in Canaan with his wife and three children.

== Political future ==
After U.S. Representative Mike Michaud announced in June 2013 that he was exploring a run for governor, McCabe was mentioned as a potential candidate for Michaud's House seat.

He announced on January 4, 2016 that he would run for Skowhegan's Maine Senate seat, currently held by Republican Rodney Whittemore.
