= MaineToday Media =

Media group and newspaper publisher from Maine, U.S.

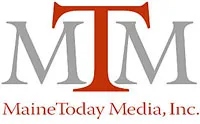
- MaineToday Media logo in red
- Industry: Newspapers
- Founded: 2009
- Fate: Acquired in 2023, merged into Maine Trust for Local News
- Headquarters: 295 Gannett Drive, South Portland, Maine, U.S.
- Products: § Newspapers

MaineToday Media, Inc. (abbreviated as MTM) was a privately owned news publisher of daily and weekly newspapers in the U.S. state of Maine, based in South Portland, in the state's largest metropolitan area. It included the Portland Press Herald, the state's largest newspaper. In 2023, the group was sold to the nonprofit National Trust for Local News, which formally consolidated the company with Alliance Media Group and Sun Media Group to form the Maine Trust for Local News.

== Newspapers ==
=== Dailies ===
The trust owns five of Maine's six daily newspapers, the exception being the Bangor Daily News. They own the flagship Portland Press Herald and its Sunday edition the Maine Sunday Telegram, the Morning Sentinel of Waterville, the Kennebec Journal of Augusta, the Sun Journal of Lewiston, and the Times Record of Brunswick.

In 2018, the trust bought the Journal Tribune of Biddeford, which was founded in 1884, and closed it the following year. Also, the Evening Express of Portland was published by Guy Gannett until it was phased out in favor of the Press Herald.

=== Weeklies ===
The trust owns The Forecasters, a group of four weeklies aimed at communities in southern Maine; as well as the American Journal of Westbrook, Gorham, and Buxton; and the Lakes Region Weekly for the Lakes Region.

They also publish the "Southern Maine Weeklies" through Mainely Media: the Biddeford-Saco-OOB Courier (Biddeford Courier), Scarborough Leader, South Portland-Cape Elizabeth Sentry (South Portland Sentry), and the Kennebunk Post, for the communities of Biddeford–Saco–Old Orchard Beach, Scarborough, South Portland–Cape Elizabeth, and Kennebunk, respectively. (Note: The Maine Trust for Local News' website states there are five newspapers in this group, but only 4 are available from their webpage on PressHerald.com.)

The "Western Maine Weeklies" include the Advertiser Democrat of the Oxford Hills, The Bethel Citizen of Bethel, The Franklin Journal of Franklin County, the Livermore Falls Advertiser of Livermore Falls, the Rangeley Highlander of Rangeley, and the Rumford Falls Times of the River Valley.

It previously published The Community Leader, a weekly a lifestyle, entertainment, and arts magazine in Falmouth (part of the Central Maine Newspapers market), which was later moved to Portland and renamed The Maine Switch. In 2008, The Bollard, a monthly magazine published in Portland, described the Switch as a "free pile of cheap wrapping paper" good for "following fads, exploring yoga and toiling away at an endless list of home improvement projects between marathon bouts of Art Walking and pandering to potential advertisers." In August 2009, the Switch ceased publication.

=== Digital ===
The trust operates three websites: CentralMaine.com, PressHerald.com, and SunJournal.com. The former websites of MaineToday and Masthead Maine redirect to the Maine Trust's website. (Note: www.mainetodaymedia.com and www.masthead.me both redirect to www.metln.org. Some webpages still exist at the previous domains, such as mediakit.masthead.me and store.masthead.me.)

CentralMaine.com hosts the Central Maine Sunday, the Morning Sentinel, and the Kennebec Journal. PressHerald.com, on top of the Press Herald itself, hosts the Times Record and the Forecasters, American Journal, Lakes Region Weekly, and the Mainely Media papers. SunJournal.com hosts the Sun Journal as well as the Western Maine Weeklies.

== History ==
=== Gannett and Blethen ===
Masthead Maine's newspaper properties were, for most of the 20th century, the core of Guy Gannett Communications, a local family-owned business not related to the larger Gannett chain. The company was founded in 1921 by its namesake, Guy P. Gannett, and managed by a family trust from 1954 until 1998, when the trust left the media business. It sold its television stations to Sinclair Broadcasting, and the newspapers to The Seattle Times Company, for a price later reported at around $213 million.

Company officials said they sold to the Times Company because of shared values: both companies were fourth-generation family-owned news organizations. "Of all the companies in the newspaper business, The Seattle Times is one most like our company in the sense of independence, of family ownership, and commitment to the community," said Guy Gannett spokesman Tim O'Meara.

The Times Company, then headed by CEO Frank Blethen, set up a subsidiary named Blethen Maine Newspapers to run its Maine operations. Frank Blethen is a descendant of Alden J. Blethen, who was born in Maine in 1845, and later bought The Seattle Times and founded the Times Company in 1896.

Blethen Maine Newspapers operated a subsidiary, Maine Community Publications, which operated The Community Leader/Maine Switch, and The Coastal Journal, a paper which was later merged into The Forecaster network. In the summer of 2006, The Bollard criticized Maine Community Publications for starting a new publication, the Old Port Times, which was apparently "selling editorial coverage to advertisers", and which The Bollard marked as a move that "trade[d] credibility for cash".

=== Formation of MaineToday Media ===
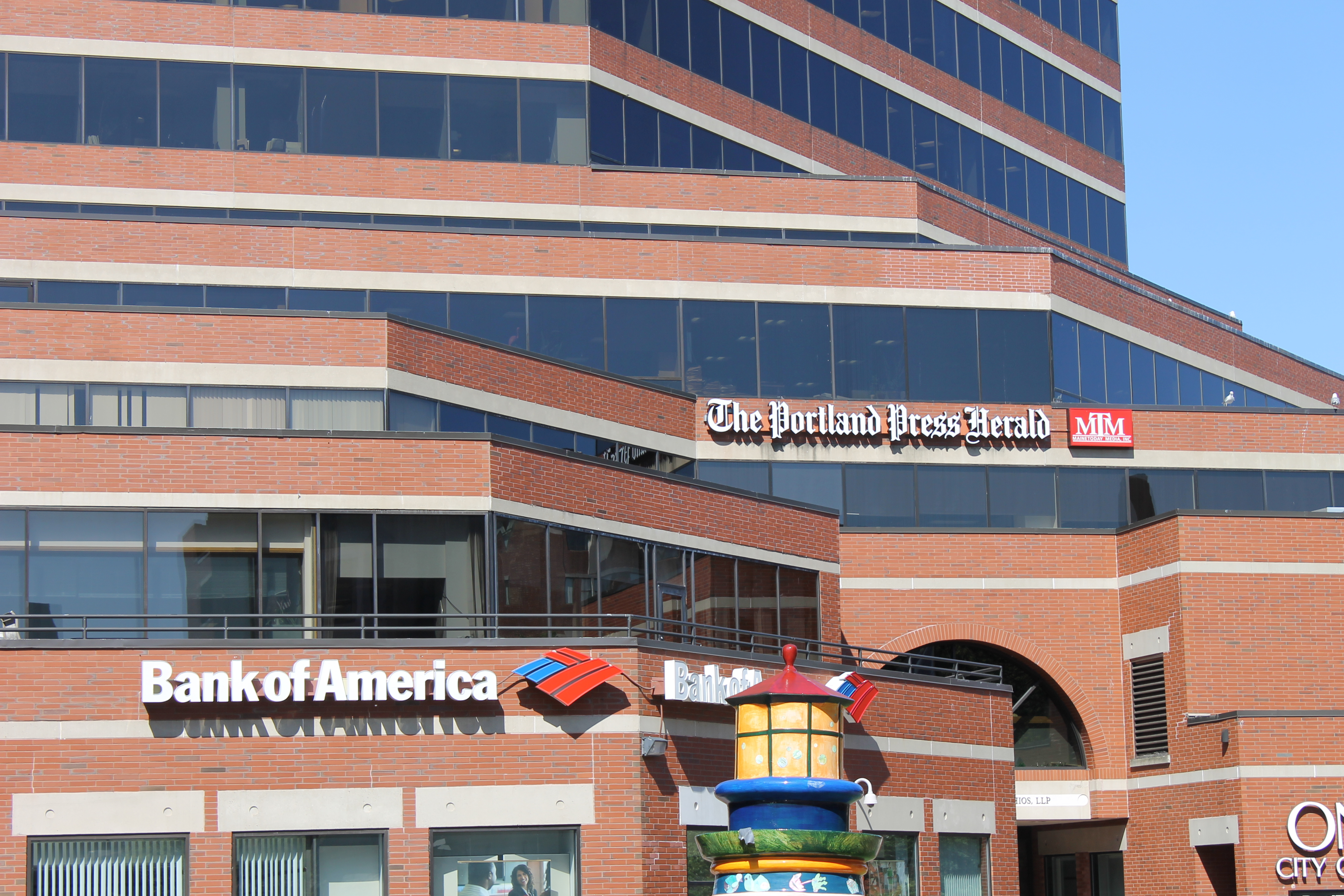
1 City Center pictured in July 2014

On 17 March 2008, the Times Company announced that it was looking to sell Blethen Maine Newspapers. On 15 June 2009, MaineToday Media was formed with the sale finalization of the Blethen papers; the new company was headed by Maine native Richard L. Connor, publisher of the Times Leader in Wilkes-Barre, Pennsylvania. As part of the sale, members of the Portland Newspaper Guild took a 10 percent pay cut in exchange for 15 percent ownership in the company. Their buildings at 385 and 390 Congress Street (part of the Press Herald Building complex) were sold in 2009, and the company established a headquarters at One City Center in downtown Portland in 2010. The former building at 390 became a hotel.

Financial details of the sale were not released, though a Seattle Times report estimated them at less than half the $213 million paid in 1998. At the time of the sale, a spokesman for The Seattle Times Company said the Maine newspapers "provided a very good return during our 10-year tenure. We were very reluctant to sell and are very sad about it. If it were not for the severe recession, we would not have done so."

MaineToday promised that it could put its newspapers on a sound financial footing, but over the next two and a half years it cut more than 160 jobs at the Portland Press Herald, the company was sued for failing to pay a paper bill, and the local guild president said his members "feel their investment in Rich Connor was squandered and they're angry about it."

Connor stepped down as publisher of the newspapers for undisclosed reasons in October 2011. In April 2013, Connor was accused of misappropriated about $530,000 of the newspapers' funds for personal expenses and unauthorized salary increases for himself. In a memo to company employees, MaineToday publisher Lisa DeSisto wrote the newspapers were paid $537,988.68 under the company’s employee theft insurance policy, to recoup money that she wrote "Connor took for unauthorized personal use."

=== Kusher and Sussman ===
In January 2012, Massachusetts businessman Aaron Kusher, who had unsuccessfully bid $200 million to buy The Boston Globe, led a group that bought a controlling interest in MaineToday Media for an undisclosed price. In March of the same year, S. Donald Sussman paid $3.3 million for a controlling stake of 75%. Concerns were raised as to a conflict of interest, as Sussman was married to U.S. Representative Chellie Pingree, who represented Maine's 1st congressional district. After his stake purchase, he invested another $13 million in the group.

=== Brower ===
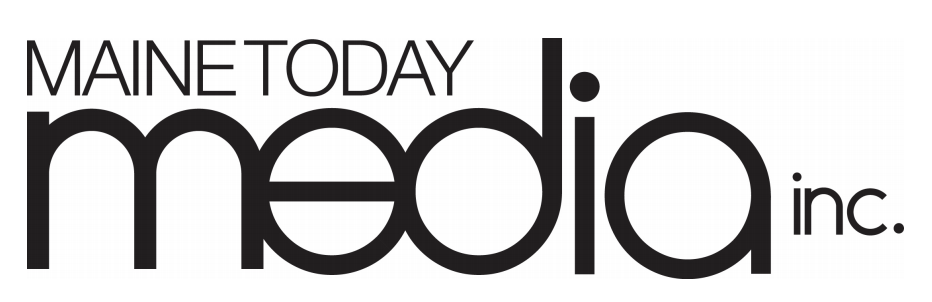
MaineToday Media logo at time of Brower acquisition

In 2015, Sussman sold MaineToday Media to Reade Brower, a Maine printer and newspaper owner who owned newspapers in Rockland and Belfast, Maine. Brower purchased the company through an acquisition company under his control, MTM Acquisition. Sussman had operated MaineToday via his Maine Values company.

MaineToday Media moved their staff from 1 City Center in Portland to their location in South Portland in early 2016. The company had been operating from 1 City Center since 2009.

Brower also purchased the Sun Media Group, parent of the Sun Journal in Lewiston, in 2017. In Spring 2018, MaineToday purchased the Biddeford Journal Tribune and the Brunswick's The Times Record, which became parts of the Alliance Press media group. Included in the purchase were the weeklies of Mainely Media. In late 2018, Alliance's operations were merged into MaineToday's.

==== Masthead Maine ====
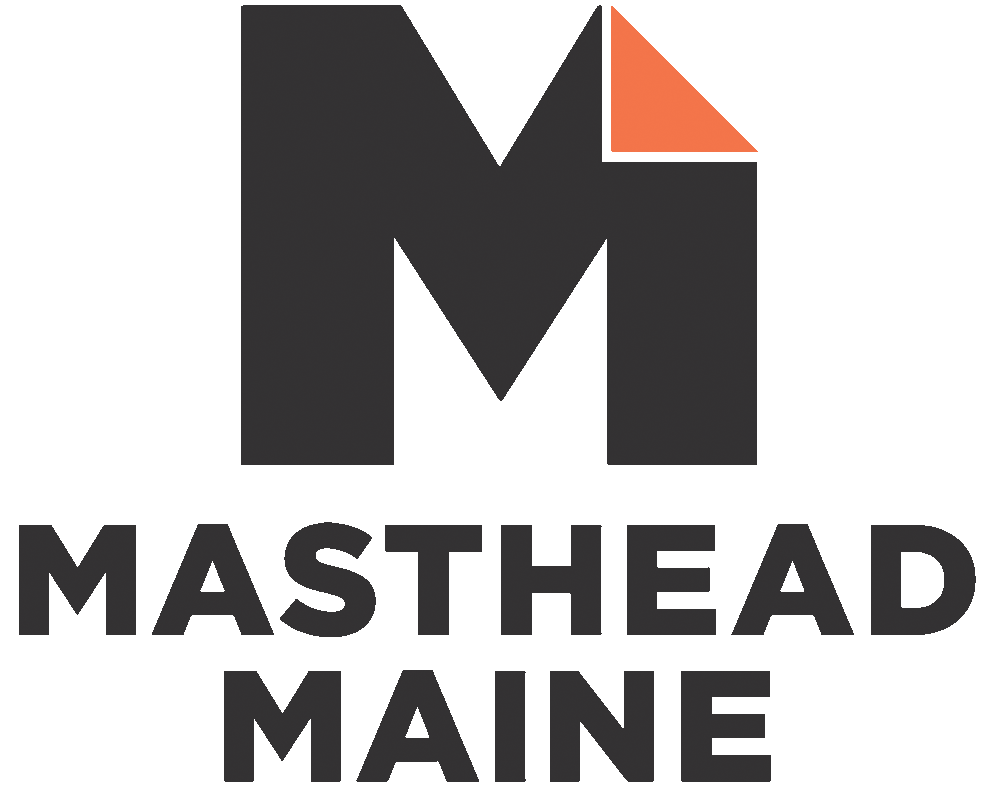
Masthead Maine logo

In January 2019, Brower consolidated the MaineToday, Sun, and Alliance media groups into Masthead Maine, aiming to unify advertising across Maine newspapers. In 2020, Masthead announced it would stop printing Monday editions for four out of five of its daily newspapers, opting instead for digital-only Monday editions, a change affecting the Portland Press Herald, Morning Sentinel, Kennebec Journal, and Sun Journal newspapers. The Times Record was excluded.

=== Maine Trust for Local News ===
Maine Trust for Local News
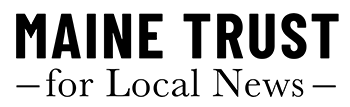
- Logo of the Maine Trust for Local News
- Type: Subsidiary of nonprofit National Trust for Local News
- Founded: 2023; 3 years ago
- Website: www.metln.org

In March 2023, Brower, then 66, announced he was looking to sell Masthead Maine, though "without urgency or desperation." The Maine Journalism Foundation expressed interest. But in July, Brower sold the company to the National Trust for Local News, a nonprofit headquartered in Denver that owned about two dozen newspapers in Colorado. The deal transferred 17 weekly newspapers and five daily papers—every daily paper in Maine except the Bangor Daily News.

The National Trust set up a subsidiary, the Maine Trust for Local News (METLN), to run the Maine newspapers. One columnist wrote that the move was backed by "left-leaning political spenders" that made "some of my friends with a more conservative outlook, see ill omens". But the News Guild of Maine greeted the changes with relief, said that they were grateful Brower chose to sell to a nonprofit. The Maine Journalism Foundation's Bill Neimitz said, "Our goal going into this was for the Press Herald and all the other Masthead Maine properties to convert to nonprofit ownership." The Foundation dissolved and transferred its remaining $171,000 to the Maine Trust. Masthead Maine CEO Lisa DeSisto, who became CEO of the Maine Trust, said the sale was "the best possible outcome".

After the takeover, Masthead Maine continued to offer some services under the former name, including Masthead Maine Press, a commercial printer.

In December 2024, DeSisto stepped down as CEO. In July 2025, the Maine Trust announced it would cut costs by:

- Laying off 13 percent of its workforce: 36 full-time and 13 part-time employees in print production, circulation and advertising at various newspapers.
- Reducing the print frequency of some daily and weekly newspapers.
- Discontinuing print publication of the Forecaster newspapers as well as the American Journal, Lakes Region Weekly, Scarborough Leader, South Portland Sentry, Biddeford Courier, and the Kennebunk Post. All remain available digitally.

In October 2025, Maine Trust publications won more than 100 awards at the Maine Press Association's annual ceremony, including awards in the general excellence category for weekend newspapers. The Maine Sunday Telegram won the general excellence award in advertising.

In May 2026, METLN hired three staffers to expand its coverage of York County, including writer Isabelle Oss to launch a morning newsletter.

== Editorial policy ==
The MaineToday editorial board announced in a 2014 editorial that they would no longer endorse candidates for political office, citing a desire to avoid appearing partisan and telling readers how to vote. Editors stated they would continue to take positions on referendums and other issues.

== Headquarters ==
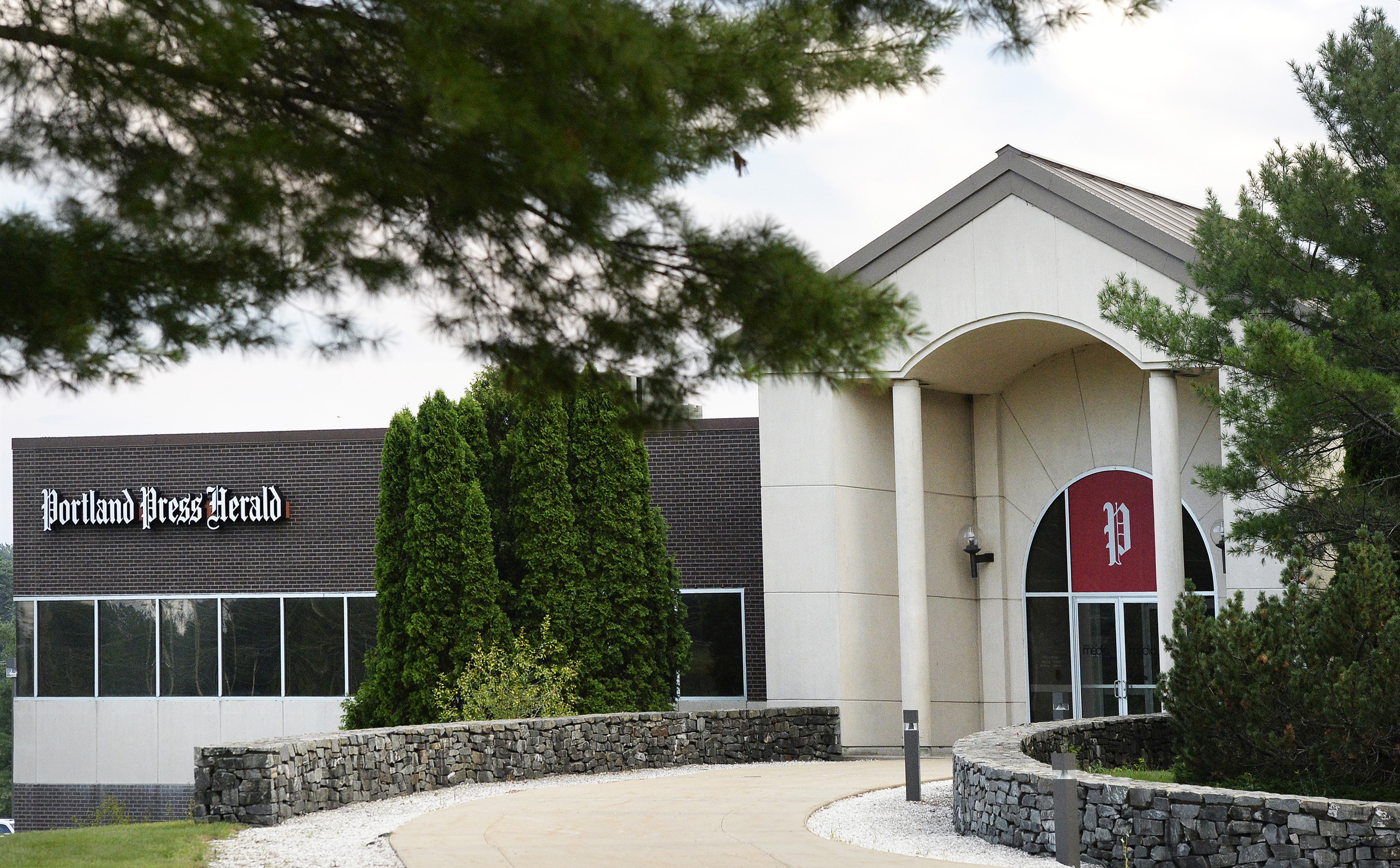
The building at 295 Gannett

The company operates an office from 295 Gannett Drive in South Portland. In 2016, the building was sold for cash flow, but it continues to be leased and operated by the trust. This address is listed on the contact page of the Press Herald.
