= Kennebec Journal =

Newspaper in Augusta, Maine

Coordinates: 44.347759°N 69.800196°W

- Type: Daily newspaper
- Format: Broadsheet
- Owner: Maine Trust for Local News (2023–present)
- Editor: Jessica Lowell
- Launched: January 1825; 201 years ago
- Headquarters: 36 Anthony Avenue, Augusta, Maine 04330, United States
- Circulation: 10,792 daily (as of 2012)
- ISSN: 0745-2039
- Website: centralmaine.com

The Kennebec Journal (KJ) is a six-day morning daily newspaper published in Augusta, Maine. KJ covers Augusta and the surrounding capital area, as well as southern Kennebec County. It is also known as the Kennebec Journal and Waterville Morning Sentinel, covering news in Waterville, Maine.

In 2023, the newspaper was acquired by the Maine Trust for Local News, a non-profit newspaper group that also publishes the state's largest newspaper, the Portland Press Herald.

== History ==
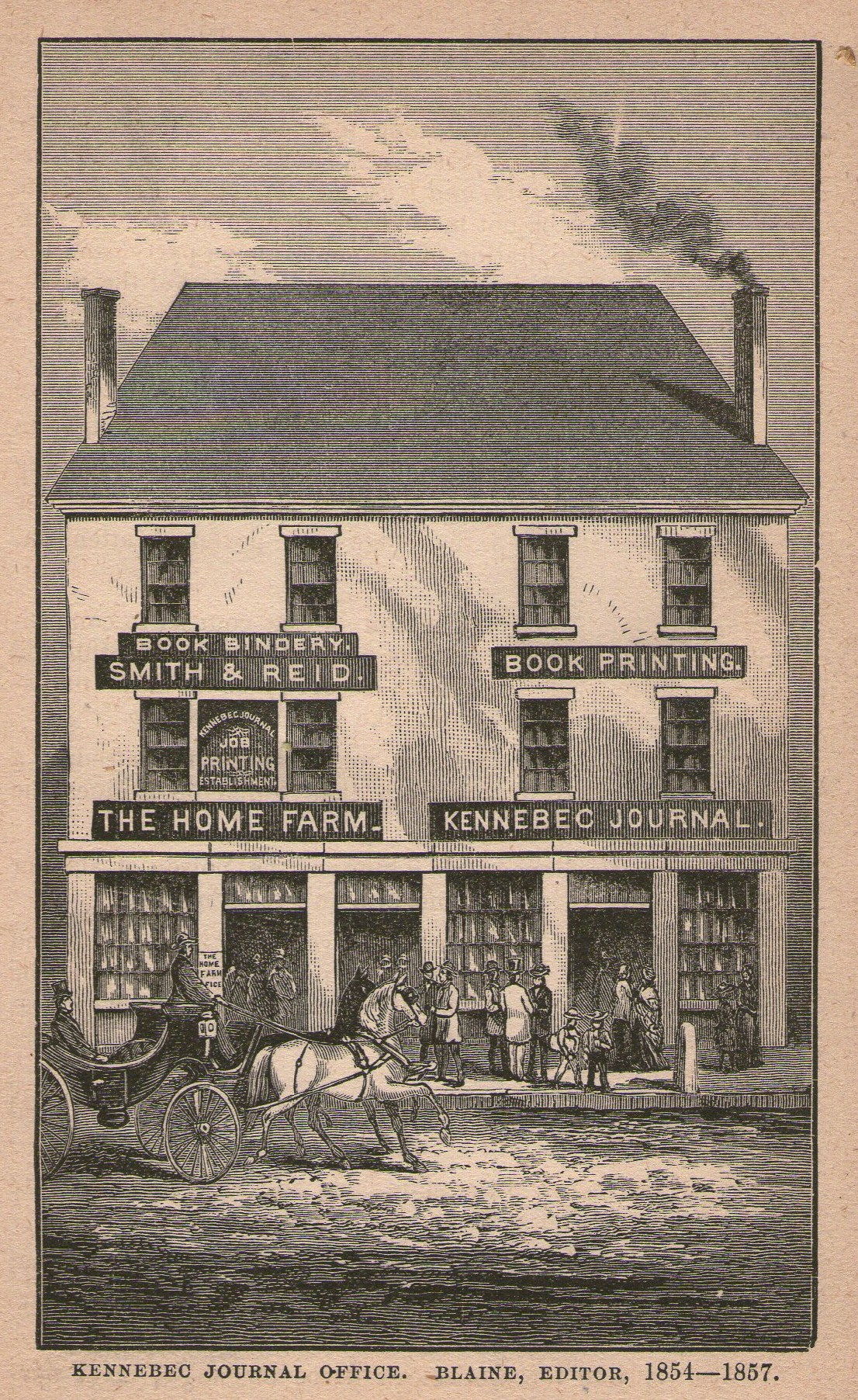
Newspaper offices in the 19th century, when James G. Blaine was editor

The Kennebec Journal began publishing as a weekly newspaper in 1825, five years after Maine had become a state.

James G. Blaine bought half of the newspaper in 1854 and became its editor. Blaine later served as United States Senator from Maine from 1876 to 1881, United States Secretary of State in 1881 and from 1889 to 1892. He was also the Republican Party's nominee for president during the 1884 election.

In November 1922, Charles F. Flint, general manager of The Kennebec Journal, and his three sons, Roy, Charles, and Leigh, purchased stock control of the newspaper.

For much of the 20th century, the Journal (along with its sister papers the Press Herald and Morning Sentinel) was part of Guy Gannett Communications, a family-owned media company based in Maine.

In 1998, Guy Gannett's newspapers were sold to Blethen Maine Newspapers, a subsidiary of The Seattle Times Company. The group was sold to MaineToday Media in 2009. MaineToday Media sold the newspapers to Masthead Maine in 2015, which in turn sold them in 2023 to the National Trust for Local News, a non-profit organization who operates the papers under its subsidiary, the Maine Trust for Local News.

Starting in April 2025, the paper will be printed five days a week instead of six and will be delivered by mail via U.S. Postal Service instead of newspaper carriers.
