= Bangor Daily News =

Newspaper serving Bangor, Maine, United States

- The May 22, 2009 front page of The Bangor Daily News
- Type: Daily newspaper
- Format: Broadsheet
- Owner: Bangor Publishing Company
- Founders: J. Norman Towle; Edward H. Blake
- Publisher: Richard J. Warren
- President: Jennifer Holmes
- Editor: Dan MacLeod
- Founded: June 18, 1889; 137 years ago
- Language: English
- Headquarters: 1 Merchants Plaza, Bangor, Maine, U.S.
- Country: United States
- ISSN: 0892-8738 (print); 2643-7457 (web)
- OCLC number: 8818350
- Website: www.bangordailynews.com

The Bangor Daily News (BDN) is an American newspaper covering a large portion of central and eastern Maine, published six days per week in Bangor, Maine.

The Bangor Daily News was founded on June 18, 1889; it merged with the Bangor Whig and Courier in 1900. The paper is published by Bangor Publishing Company, a local family-owned company.

BDN has been owned by the Towle-Warren family for four generations; current publisher Richard J. Warren is the great-grandson of J. Norman Towle, who bought the paper in 1895. Since 2018, it has been the only independently owned daily newspaper in the state.

== History ==
=== 19th century ===
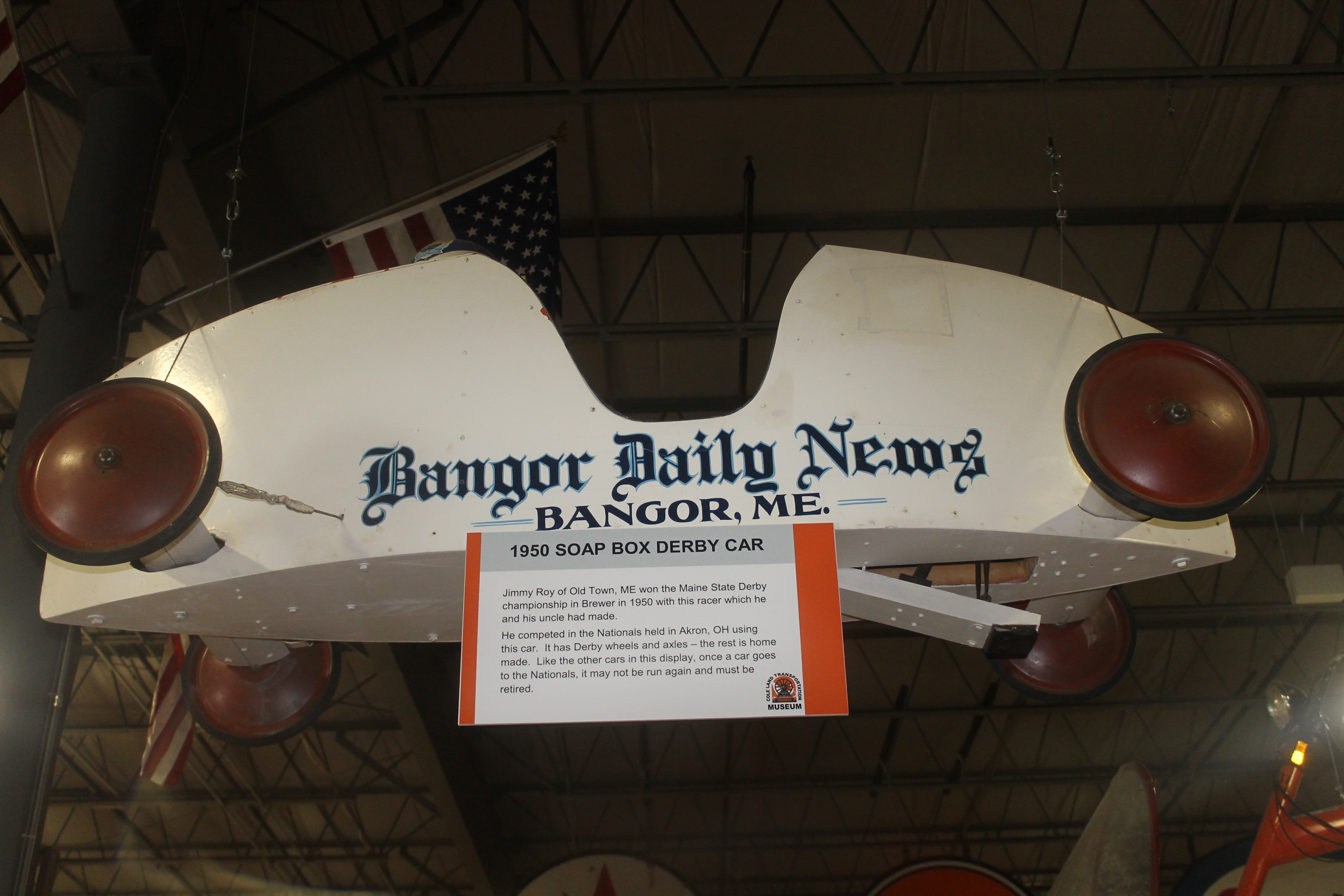
As part of its community relations, the Bangor Daily News sponsored a soap box derby car in 1950, which bore the newspaper's logo. The car is on display at Cole Land Transportation Museum in Bangor.

The Bangor Daily News's first issue was June 18, 1889; the main stockholder in the publishing company was Bangor shipping and logging businessman Thomas J. Stewart. Upon Stewart's death in 1890, his sons took control of the paper, which was originally a tabloid with "some news, but also plenty of gossip, lurid stories and scandals." In 1895, J. Norman Towle purchased the newspaper. Ownership of the paper remained in the family, and Towle's great-grandson Richard J. Warren remains the publisher today.

=== 20th century ===
The Bangor Daily News merged with the Bangor Whig & Courier in 1900, leaving two newspapers in the city: BDN and the Bangor Daily Commercial, which ceased publication in 1949. Towle's son-in-law Fred Jordan took control of the paper in 1929. Forty-six BDN staff members served in the U.S. forces during World War II, and the paper's managing editor John M. O'Connell was sent to Europe as a war correspondent. After Fred Jordan's death in 1947, his widow Lillis Towle Jordan became publisher. Richard K. Warren became publisher in 1955 and remained in that role until 1984, a time when the newspaper's circulation dramatically increased. It has only missed one day of delivery in its entire history. On New Year's Eve 1962, a massive blizzard dumped over three feet of snow on Bangor, with 20-foot snowdrifts that made it impossible for the delivery trucks to move.

The newspaper's peak came in the mid-1980s, when Bangor Daily News had 150 reporters and editors and 150 other employees. At the time, published seven regional editions of the newspaper throughout Maine, and in addition to its main office on Main Street in Bangor had news bureaus at Madawaska, Presque Isle, Houlton, Pittsfield, Calais, Machias, Rockland, Augusta and Ellsworth.

In 1982, a reporter for the Bangor Daily News, Beurmond Banville, who ran a one-person news bureau for the paper in Madawaska, Maine, on the U.S.-Canada border, wrote about a pretrial hearing in a murder case in New Brunswick, Canada. After publishing an account of the restricted proceeding in BDN, Banville was convicted in a Canadian court for violating a publication ban, and was fined $160; in 1983, the Court of Appeal of New Brunswick upheld the conviction, but gave Banville an absolute discharge, meaning that he does not have any Canadian criminal record. Banville and the newspaper considered the Canadian court's ruling to be a prior restraint on freedom of the press, but decided not to further appeal considering the cost. The ruling appears in a textbook on Canadian media law.

Richard J. Warren succeeded his father as editor in 1984; five years later, the newspaper moved its printing plant from Bangor to a new printing plant in Hampden (which was closed in 2013 and sold in 2015).

The newspaper was an early adopter of a policy prohibiting tobacco advertising. As of 1993, the Bangor Daily News was one of fewer than twenty American newspapers that declined to accept ads for tobacco products.

=== 21st century ===
The newspaper launched its Web presence in 1997 at bangornews.com, later moving to bangordailynews.com in the 2000s. From 1997 to 2001, BDN acted as an Internet service provider in addition to a newspaper, working with two local, small telecommunications companies to provide dial-up Internet access to a few thousand people in Maine.

BDN adopted an aggressive "digital-first" publishing strategy, and became the most-read online news source in the state; in 2011, the Portland Press Herald outsold BDN in print copies by a few thousand papers on an average weekday, but BDN's website had more than 100,000 unique visitors than the Press Herald's website.

In 2008, the paper's editorial page director, Todd Benoit, was appointed BDN's director of new media; he later became BDN's president and chief operating officer. In 2014, Richard J. Warren became publisher of the newspaper. The company that owns and operates the newspaper, Bangor Publishing, expanded through acquisitions of Bangor Metro magazine (2014), Madawaska's St. John Valley Times (2015), and Fort Kent's Fiddlehead Focus (2016). The company also owns several weekly newspapers in Maine: the Presque Isle Star-Herald, Caribou Aroostook Republican and News, Dover-Foxcroft Piscataquis Observer, Houlton Pioneer Times, and Greater Bangor The Weekly.

In 2011 and 2012, BDN established the partnerships The Maine Campus, the independent student newspaper at the University of Maine, and The Free Press, the student newspaper at the University of Southern Maine, through the BDN media partners program. The program involves a content-sharing agreement as well as training and Web hosting services provided by BDN to the student newspapers.

In 2011, BDN hired an additional reporter to cover Greater Portland and reassigned another reporter to cover the southern mid-coast of Maine. Editor-in-chief Mike Dowd also named editorial-page editor Susan Young as "managing editor for investigative reporting and new initiatives" and appointed Tom Groening as editorial-page editor.

The Bangor Daily News and The Quoddy Tides sought records under the Maine Freedom of Access Act of closed-door tribal councils of the Passamaquoddy Tribe relating to a proposed $500 million liquefied natural gas (LNG) terminal on tribal land at the Pleasant Point Reservation. A Maine court decided that the newspapers were not entitled to the records because the tribal officials' negotiations with the Oklahoma-based LNG developer were undertaken in the reservation's capacity as "a profit-making business rather than municipal governance" and were therefore not subjected to the Freedom of Access Act. The Maine Supreme Judicial Court unanimously affirmed the ruling in 2006. In 2013, Bangor Daily News reporters submitted a public records request to Maine's state government for public information that included the names and addresses of the holders of concealed-weapon permits. The request, made in furtherance of newsgathering, prompted a fierce uproar, and the newspaper dropped the request.

In 2018, Bangor Daily News became the state's only independently owned daily newspaper in the state, after MaineToday Media, owned by Reade Brower, acquired additional newspapers in Maine. MaineToday now owns seven of Maine's eight daily newspapers: the Portland Press Herald and Maine Sunday Telegram, the Times Record of Brunswick, the Journal Tribune of Biddeford, the Kennebec Journal in Augusta, the Morning Sentinel in Waterville, and the Coastal Journal in Bath. Although Brower's company does not own BDN, it does provide printing services for BDN.

As of 2020, about half of BDN's journalists were based in Bangor, with the other half spread across Maine. In May 2022, the newsroom staff unionized with the Maine NewsGuild and won recognition from management.

In 2023, BDN stopped printing a Monday newspaper as part of a national "digital-only" trend. This includes focusing on a premium, subscriber-only politics newsletter aimed at government entities and nonprofit organizations.

In April 2025, The Maine Wire reported that Bangor Publishing Company received more than $2.4 million from state agencies since Governor Janet Mills took office in 2019. The money was used for "public affairs." In December 2025, BDN began publishing a statement of core journalistic values, such as accountability, transparency, and independent journalism. In an opinion column, executive editor Dan MacLeod also vowed to correct the newspaper's "factual errors."

== Editorial stance ==
The Bangor Daily News's editorial stance has traditionally leaned toward conservatism and the Republican Party in contrast to the Portland Press Herald, which was regarded as having a more liberal, pro-Democratic editorial stance. It historically endorsed Republican candidates for office, such as Barry Goldwater in the 1964 presidential election, but has also sometimes endorsed Democratic candidates. In the 1974 Maine gubernatorial election, the Bangor Daily News endorsed independent candidate James B. Longley: "The newspaper had always endorsed Republicans, so backing an independent was stunning." The endorsement was a major boost to Longley's candidacy. The paper endorsed conservative independent candidate Herman "Buddy" Frankland in the 1978 gubernatorial election, and Republican U.S. Senate candidate Susan Collins.

BDN's editorial board endorsed Republican George W. Bush in the 2000 presidential election, but endorsed Democrat John Kerry over Bush in the 2004 presidential election. In 2008, BDN endorsed Democrat Barack Obama for president, Republican Susan Collins for Senate, and Democrats Mike Michaud and Chellie Pingree for Maine's congressional seats. The paper's editorial board endorsed Obama for reelection over Republican challenger Mitt Romney in the 2012 presidential election.

BDN endorsed Democratic presidential candidates Hillary Clinton in 2016, Joe Biden in 2020, and Kamala Harris in 2024.
