= Morning Sentinel =

Newspaper in Waterville, Maine

- Type: Daily newspaper
- Format: Broadsheet
- Owner: Maine Trust for Local News (2023–present)
- Editor: Scott Monroe (acting); Jim Evans (managing editor)
- Founded: March 3, 1904, as Waterville Morning Sentinel
- Headquarters: 31 Front Street, Waterville, Maine 04901, United States
- Circulation: 13,922 daily
- OCLC number: 38243825
- Website: centralmaine.com

The Morning Sentinel is an American daily newspaper published six mornings a week in Waterville, Maine. Printed at the Portland Press Herald press in South Portland, Maine, it covers cities and towns in parts of Franklin, Kennebec, Penobscot and Somerset counties.

The publication was run between 2000 and 2023 by MaineToday Media. In August 2023, it was announced that it had been acquired by a non-profit group of Maine newspapers, Maine Trust for Local News.

== History ==
Founded in 1904 by officials of the Waterville Democratic Party—Waterville mayor Cyrus Davis; future U.S. Senator Charles Fletcher Johnson; and future mayor L. Eugene Thayer, leavened by newspaper veteran Thomas F. Murphy—the Waterville Morning Sentinel, within a year, grew from a three-desk operation to requiring its own building, on Silver Street.

In 1911, a financially ailing Davis sold the paper to bond holders; ten years later, it was bought by Guy Gannett, who was in the process of building a newspaper, radio and television empire in Maine. His holdings included the Portland Press Herald and, after 1929, the Sentinel's in-county competitor, the Kennebec Journal.

Gannett's ownership also saw the paper become less politically biased. Gannett and his heirs—no relation to the Virginia-based chain called Gannett Company—held the three Maine dailies until 1998, when they sold them to The Seattle Times Company, which rechristened the chain "Blethen Maine Newspapers".

Frank Blethen, a descendant of Seattle Times founder Albert Blethen, a Maine native, later called the purchase "the largest and riskiest investment in our history" but a necessary move to keep the newspapers from becoming part of a corporate chain.

It was sold in 2009 to MaineToday Media. In December, the newspaper was criticized for firing one of its journalists who had made negative remarks about the gay-rights group Human Rights Campaign.

Starting in April 2025, the paper will be printed five days a week instead of six and will be delivered by mail via U.S. Postal Service instead of newspaper carriers.
