= Gambling in Massachusetts =

Types and locations of gambling allowed in Massachusetts, US

Locations of notable gambling sites in Massachusetts
Racetrack and slot parlor
Resort casino
Planned Indian casino
Simulcast wagering facility

Legal forms of gambling in the U.S. state of Massachusetts include casinos, sports betting, parimutuel wagering on horse racing, the Massachusetts Lottery, and charitable gaming. The Massachusetts Gaming Commission regulates commercial operations under state jurisdiction.

== Horse and dog racing ==
Parimutuel wagering on horse racing is allowed at the state's only active racetrack, Plainridge Racecourse. Simulcast wagering on horse and dog races is also offered at Suffolk Downs and Raynham Park, which previously operated as racetracks.

Betting on horse and dog racing was legalized in 1934.

Suffolk Downs opened in 1935 and was the state's primary site for Thoroughbred racing until it held its last races in 2019.

The first dog tracks were Wonderland Greyhound Park and Taunton Dog Track, opened in 1935. They were joined in 1941 by Raynham Greyhound Park. The Taunton track closed in 1981, and its operations were absorbed into the Raynham track, which became known as Raynham-Taunton Greyhound Park. Both remaining tracks closed by the end of 2009, when dog racing was banned by the Massachusetts Greyhound Protection Act.

Harness racing began in 1947 at Bay State Raceway (later named Foxboro Raceway). Suffolk Downs included the sport in its calendar from 1959 to 1970. Foxboro closed in 1997 and was replaced in 1999 with the opening of Plainridge.

In addition to the major tracks, wagering was also conducted on horse and dog races at agricultural fairs around the state, including the Northampton Fair, Marshfield Fair, Great Barrington Fair, Weymouth Fair, Berkshire County Fair (at Berkshire Downs), Brockton Fair, and Topsfield Fair. Race fixing was notoriously common at these meets. This fair circuit came to an end when the last remaining venue, Northampton, held its final racing meet in 2005.

== Lottery ==
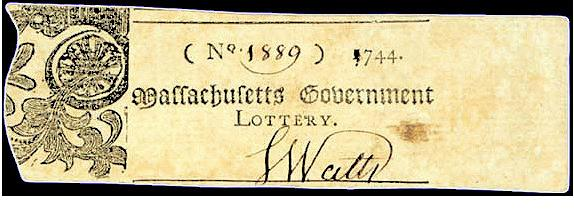
A ticket from the first public lottery in Massachusetts, authorized in 1745

The Massachusetts Lottery offers draw games and scratchcards. The Lottery also offers pull tabs for sale at bars.

Private lotteries were common in early colonial history, but as public attitudes turned against them, Massachusetts banned all lotteries in 1719. The province's first public lottery was authorized in 1745, to pay for expenses related to King George's War. At least fifteen lotteries were authorized from 1749 to 1761, until the Lords of Trade expressed their disapproval of the practice, effectively banning public lotteries in Massachusetts until the American Revolution, when lotteries again became frequent, until a new ban was enacted in 1833. The modern Lottery was created in 1971 and held its first drawings the following year.

== Charitable gaming ==
Eligible non-profit organizations are allowed to operate certain gambling games for fundraising purposes, including bridge and whist, bingo (also called "beano"), raffles, pull tabs, and casino nights (referred to as "bazaars"). Senior citizen organizations ("golden age clubs") are also allowed to run bingo games with little oversight, with prizes of $100 or less.

As of 2017, the total annual gross revenues reported for charitable gaming were about $57 million, with $25 million from bingo, $12 million from pull tabs, $19 million from raffles, and $300,000 from bazaars. There were 116 licensed charitable bingo operators.

Several poker rooms throughout the state operate under the casino night law, with daily games benefitting a rotating set of charities.

Whist and bridge fundraisers were legalized in 1932. Beano was legalized in 1934, but then banned in 1943 because racketeers were operating games using charities as fronts. Raffles and bazaars were authorized in 1969. Beano was re-legalized in 1971, with a local election required in each city or town to allow it.

== Casinos ==
=== List of casinos ===
Casino	City	Type	Owner/Operator
Aquinnah Cliffs Casino (planned)	Aquinnah	Indian casino	Wampanoag Tribe of Gay Head (Aquinnah)
Encore Boston Harbor	Everett	Resort casino	Wynn Resorts
MGM Springfield	Springfield	Resort casino	MGM Resorts International
Plainridge Park Casino	Plainville	Slot parlor	Gaming and Leisure Properties / Penn National Gaming
First Light Casino & Resort (planned)	Taunton	Indian casino	Mashpee Wampanoag Tribe

=== Indian casinos ===
Both of the state's federally recognized tribes have worked for several years to open gaming facilities on tribal lands, under the federal Indian Gaming Regulatory Act. The Mashpee Wampanoag Tribe hopes to open a casino on land in Taunton. The Wampanoag Tribe of Gay Head (Aquinnah) plans a small gaming facility in Aquinnah, on Martha's Vineyard.

The Mashpee tribe gained federal recognition in 2007, and in 2015 received approval for land to be taken into trust for a casino. Construction on the casino, referred to as Project First Light, began in 2016, located in an industrial park. Later that year, however, a court overturned the land-into-trust approval, and work on the project was suspended. The casino remained in legal limbo as of 2019.

In 2025 a Welcome Center for the First Light Casino development was opened in Taunton, MA. This milestone marked a significant achievement for the Mashpee Wampanoag Tribe, serving as a preview of what is to come with the full First Light Casino’s Class III facility.

The Aquinnah tribe announced plans in 2013 for their Class II gaming facility in an unfinished community center. The state quickly sued to block the project, arguing that the tribe gave up gambling rights in a 1983 land settlement, in which the tribe agreed its lands would be subject to state law. The tribe argued that this agreement was superseded by the 1988 Indian Gaming Regulatory Act. The tribe prevailed in the legal fight in 2018, and began moving ahead with plans to build the casino at a new site on their reservation. The casino stalled again, however, after courts ruled that the project would have to comply with local building permit requirements, which the tribe saw as a violation of its sovereignty.

=== Commercial casinos ===
Under the Expanded Gaming Act, passed in 2011, as many as three casino resorts and one slot parlor can be opened. A slot parlor opened at Plainridge Park Casino in 2015, and two casino resorts, MGM Springfield and Encore Boston Harbor, opened in 2018 and 2019, respectively. One more casino license may be issued for the southeastern part of the state, but the process has been delayed due to uncertainty about potential competition from the planned Mashpee Wampanoag casino.

=== Casino cruises ===
Gambling boats have operated at times out of Massachusetts harbors, taking passengers on "cruises to nowhere" in federal waters, where state gambling laws do not apply. The first was the Vegas Express, which sailed out of Gloucester from 1998 to 1999. The Southern Elegance and the El Dorado set out from Gloucester starting in 1999, as did the Midnight Gambler out of Lynn, before it moved to Provincetown and operated for six weeks in 2000. Another boat, run by Atlantic Casino Cruises, ran out of Gloucester from 2002 to 2003. The Lynn harbor also played host to the Horizon's Edge casino cruise, from 2000 to 2009, and the Aquasino, which ran for several months in 2013.

== Sports betting ==
Sports betting is legal at retail sportsbooks, located at the state's three casinos, and through licensed online betting providers. There are seven online sportsbooks in operation: Bally Bet, BetMGM, Caesars, DraftKings, Fanatics, FanDuel, and Penn Sports.

State lawmakers legalized sports betting in August 2022, as part of a wave of legalization after the overturning in 2018 of the federal ban on sports betting. Brick-and-mortar sportsbooks began operations in January 2023. Online betting began in March 2023.

Sportsbooks are taxed at a rate of 15% for in-person bets and 20% for online bets, based on gross wagering revenue (the amount bet minus the amount paid out for winning bets).

== See also ==
- 2014 Massachusetts Casino Repeal Initiative proposition
- 2016 Massachusetts Expand Slot Machine Gaming Initiative proposition
- List of casino hotels
- Gambling in the United States
- List of casinos in the United States
- Massachusetts Council on Compulsive Gambling
