= Massachusetts question 3 =

Massachusetts question 3 may refer to:

- Question 3, 2002 ballot
- Question 3, 2006 ballot
- Massachusetts Greyhound Protection Act, 2008 ballot
- Massachusetts Sales Tax Relief Act, 2010 ballot
- Massachusetts Medical Marijuana Initiative, 2012 ballot
- Massachusetts Casino Repeal Initiative, 2014 ballot
- Massachusetts Conditions for Farm Animals Initiative, 2016 ballot
- Gender Identity Anti-Discrimination, 2018 ballot
