= Dorothy Morkis =

American equestrian

Personal information
- Full name: Dorothy Sarkis Morkis
- Born: December 29, 1942 (age 83) Boston, Massachusetts, U.S.
- Height: 172 cm (5 ft 8 in)
- Weight: 59 kg (130 lb)
Medal record
Equestrian
Representing the United States
Olympic Games
Bronze medal – third place	1976 Montreal	Team dressage
Pan American Games
Gold medal – first place	1975 Mexico City	Team dressage
Bronze medal – third place	1975 Mexico City	Individual dressage

Dorothy Sarkis Morkis (born December 29, 1942) is an American equestrian who won a bronze medal for America in team dressage aboard her white gelding Monaco in the 1976 Montreal Olympics where she had the highest individual dressage score of any American Dressage Team competitor. In one of her mount Monaco's best showings, she won a gold medal in team and a bronze medal in individual dressage in the 1975 Mexico City Pan Am games. She continued to compete in high level dressage intermittently through the 1980s and 1990s and later taught dressage to students.

== Early life ==
Morkis was born on December 29, 1942, in Boston. She was one of two children born to Abe Sarkis, a building contractor and convicted bookmaker and tax evader, and his wife Dorothy (Rooney) Sarkis. Morkis's brother, Charles Sarkis, founded Back Bay Restaurant Group and owned Wonderland Greyhound Park. She graduated from the Jeanne d'Arc Academy, Chandler School for Women, and Mary Brooks School. In 1968, she married Dr. Edward S. Morkis Jr.

== 1976 Olympic bronze medal ==
In the Olympic team trails for the 1976 Olympics, she placed third behind her teammates Hilda Gurney of Woodland Hills, and Edith Master of New York. She scored adequately in both the Grand Prix Test and Grand Prix Special Test, placing her within 10-20 points of second place in each.

In her best known showing, Morkis took a fifth in individual dressage, and won a bronze medal in team dressage at the 1976 Summer Olympics in Montreal aboard her white Hanoverian mount Monaco.

== 1975 Pan American games ==
Once again aboard her white gelding Monaco in the 1975 Pan American Games in Mexico City, she won a gold medal in Team Dressage and a bronze medal in Individual Dressage. Future American Dressage teammate Hilda Gurney, who shared the bronze olympic team medal with Dorothy in 1976, took the Silver in Individual Dressage just ahead of Dorothy at the Pan Am Games that year.

== Coaches ==
Some of Dorothy's coaching was provided by Ernest Bachinger of Vienna, while he was an instructor at the Spanish Riding School in 1972, and by former Olympic rider Jessica Newberry Ransehousen. Her best known coach and trainer was likely her 1976 American Olympic Dressage Team coach, Colonel Bengt Ljungquist of Sweden, former cavalry officer, Dressage competitor and Olympic fencing athlete, who helped American dressage break a 28-year Olympic medal drought that year.

== 1978 World Dressage Championships ==
Dorothy competed in the July 1978 World Championships in Goodwood, England, once again aboard her white German-bred Hanoverian mount Monaco, impressively placing fifth in individual dressage, but did not medal. The Germans took first in Team Dressage, with the Swiss taking second and the Soviets taking an unexpected third. Still competing at a high level, the American Dressage Team of Dorothy Markis, with her 1976 Olympic bronze medal team-mates Edith Master, and Helen Gurney took fourth in Team Dressage. Dorothy stabled her prize mount Monaco at White Horse Farms in Raynham, Massachusetts. The American Dressage team ran close to the third place Soviets' Dressage Team, finishing with a combined score only 35 points behind them.

== Later competition ==
Taking a long break from competition after 1977, Morkis was active again in high level dressage competition at the age of 38 in 1981 aboard "Pandur" al known as Puff in May, taking a blue ribbon in Fourth Level Test 1 and she also rode Briensbridge or Frankie that year who belonged to a friend. She took a first place American Saddlebred Horse Association (ASHA) fourth level aboard Pandur and a second place rating aboard Briensbridge at the well-known Devon Show Grounds Dressage competition in Southeastern Pennsylvania in August 1982. Fourth Level is the most advanced level of dressage, and it includes all the fancy “dancing” movements during an Olympic freestyle test or in non-olympic competition. She did well in the Pan-American Games Test in Hamilton in 1983, placing second in the Prix St. Georges, and fifth in the Intermediare II.

She placed second aboard her mount Wandi in the Federation Equestre Intermediare 1 Freestyle Dressage Competition in Lexington, Virginia in early May 1989. She competed in the Edmund, Oklahoma U. S. Olympic Festival in Dressage in July 1989 with other prior Olympians. Competing again at a high level aboard Anrijetto, she won the stallion Championship, the overall grand championship, and the mature horse championship in the Dressage of Devon on September 24, 1992, at the Devon Horse Show Grounds.

=== Millers/USET Championship ===
In June 1997, riding mounts Elvira and Gershwin, she competed and made one of her best later life showings at 54 in New Jersey's Millers/USET championship winning the open Grand Prix Freestyle, and taking second in the Open Intermediare Freestyle. She came in fourth at the Millers/USET championship in the Open Prix St. George and third in the Open Grand Prix, again aboard Gershwin.

== Sports management roles ==
In 1988, Dorothy served as the equestrian sports representative to the Athlete's Advisory Council, and chairman of the United States Olympic Committee's Apparel Committee.

In 2000, she attended a charitable dinner sponsored by the Wildwood Charitable Foundation that included several well-known Equestrians in Akron, Ohio to benefit the St. Judes Children's Research Hospital.

== Teaching Dressage ==
In 2002–2003, she provided Dressage Instruction twice a month at Sunny Dutch Farm in Easthampton, Massachusetts. In 2004, she provided Dressage Instruction at Peaceful Valley Equestrian Center at Harveys Lake, near Beaumont, Pennsylvania, and the local Times Leader noted that she had trained a few dressage champions and their mounts during her training career. Dorothy became adept at instructing students how to distribute their weight properly, how to apply foot and leg pressure to their horse's sides, and how to use the reigns. She noted, "The rider's position is what tells the horse what you want him to do. If you're not well balanced, its not clear to him what you want him to do".
