= Massachusetts ballot measures =

Massachusetts ballot measures may refer to:

- Massachusetts 2008 ballot measures
- Massachusetts 2012 ballot measures
