= Wonderland Amusement Park (Massachusetts) =

Amusement park in Revere, Massachusetts (closed 1910)

- Interactive map of Wonderland Amusement Park
- Location: Revere, Massachusetts
- Coordinates: 42.41121°N 70.99447°W
- Status: Defunct
- Opened: 1906
- Closed: 1910

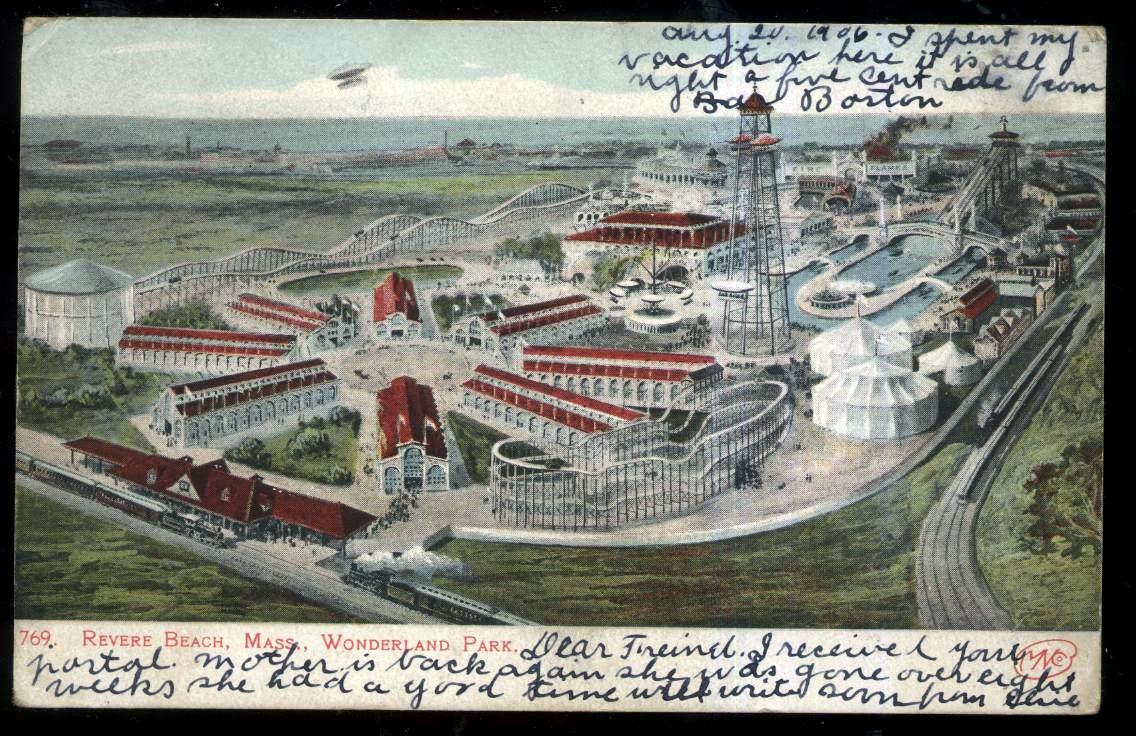
A 1906 postcard of Wonderland Amusement Park. Some features, like the railroad station and eight long buildings at lower left, were likely never actually built.

The Wonderland Amusement Park operated from 1906 to 1910 in Revere, Massachusetts. Wonderland featured various state-of-the-art rides, attractions, and performers. Although some features remained constant through the life of the park, most of the attractions changed from year to year. The park was served by the Boston, Revere Beach and Lynn Railroad, known as the "Narrow Gauge". Today, the rail stop is named Wonderland and is the northern terminus of the MBTA's Blue Line. The title of the 1998 film Next Stop Wonderland refers to this station.

== Bankruptcy ==
Largely because of the nationwide economic downturn known as the Panic of 1907, Wonderland was bankrupt at the end of the 1908 season. They were able to re-open the next season, but they had to follow an austere regimen, and many attractions were closed down. The Park managed to continue operating until the end of the 1910 season, then closed for good.

The Wonderland Greyhound Park opened across Route 1A from the bulk of the Amusement Park, twenty five years later, before its own closure in 2009. Today the site of most of Wonderland is occupied by the Wonderland Marketplace Mall and its parking lot. The Mall buildings occupy the same positions as many of the original Wonderland buildings. This is probably because the site was originally a marsh, and the Wonderland Park builders drove 60,000 spruce pilings into the ground to give the buildings a firm foundation. The Mall buildings are built atop those pilings.

== Former attractions ==
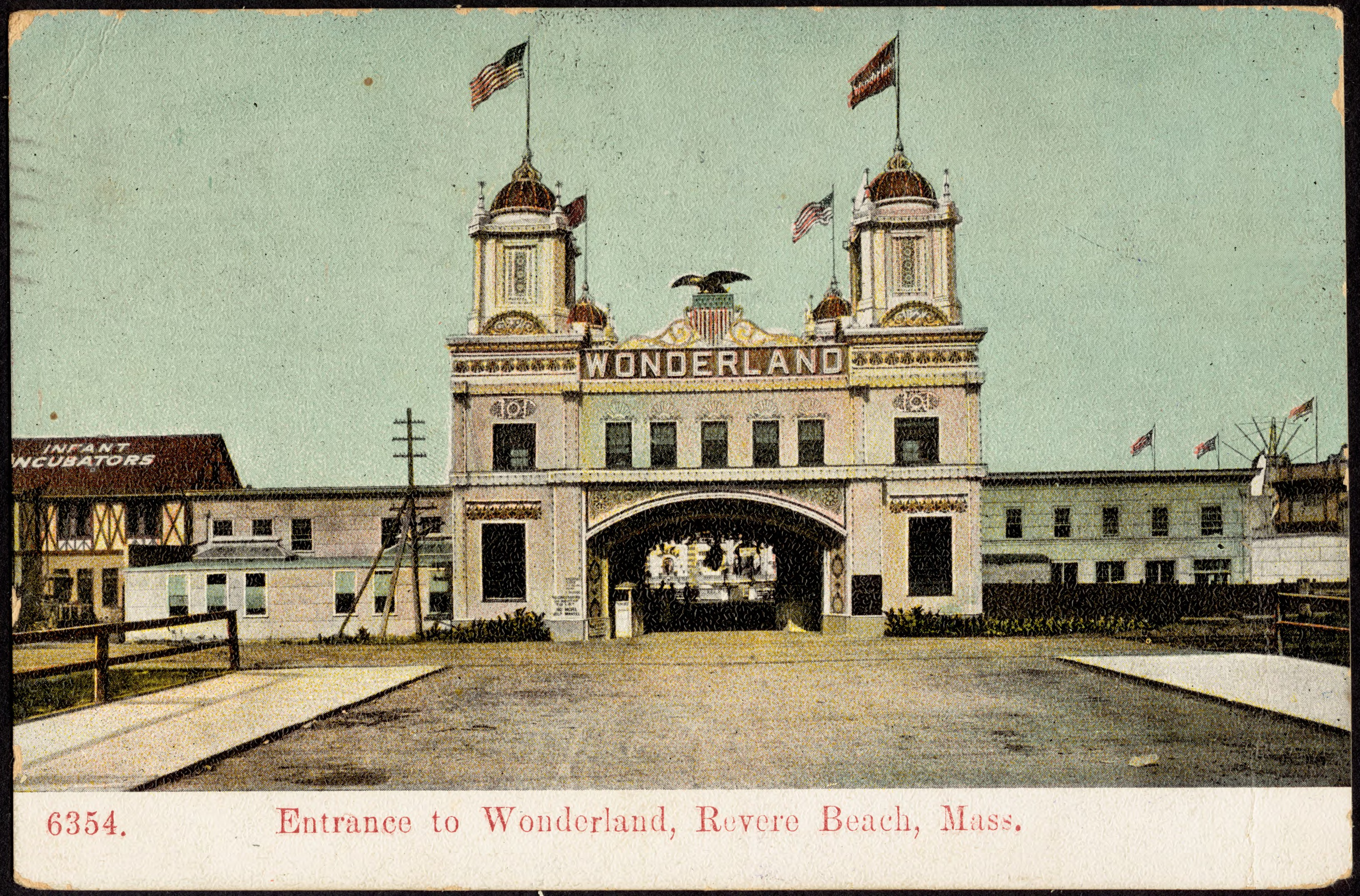
Postcard view of the park's main entrance

=== Permanent ===
- Shoot the Chutes -- a water ride in which a light skiff was raised to the top of a water-lubricated ramp, then released. It would gather speed and skip across the surface of a splashdown Lagoon. The Wonderland ride was purchased from the 1904 St. Louis Exposition, and was the largest in the world
- Love's Journey -- a "Tunnel of Love" type of ride, but with many technical innovations. Its patent had not yet been granted when the Park opened. Wonderland had the very first one
- Descent into the Hell Gate -- a Water ride in which boats followed a spiral track on an upper level, then suddenly shot down to a lower level when it got to the center. The lower level was decorated as a cavern, and the passengers disembarked and were led before the throne of Satan. Wonderland had the second such ride built.(The first was installed in Luna Park in Coney Island)
- Circle Swing -- a tall tower with six arms from which long cables extended to support six "boats". The top of the tower rotated and sent the boats swinging outward by centrifugal force
- Whirl the Whirl -- a large vertical shaft supported four arms that held "cars". As the set of cars rotated, they slowly rose, as well, describing a helical route. Wonderland's ride was the second one built. The first was at Coney Island
- Infant Incubators -- the Incubators were open every season but one. They were the same installations that Dr. Martin A. Couney had placed at Coney Island and at amusement parks all across the country in an effort to popularize Incubators to rescue premature babies.
- The LaMarcus A. Thompson Scenic Railway -- A staple of amusement parks, this was the first to be brought to Revere Beach. It featured a gently undulating track that took passengers out to an oval building where they were taken past dioramas of world scenes, such as Venice and Mount Vesuvius, before being brought back to the start.
- Restaurant and Ballroom
- Velvet Coaster -- a more traditional roller coaster went in beside the Shoot the Chutes ride in the Park's 1907 season and remained for the rest of the Park's life.

=== Short duration ===
Many other attractions were open for one to three years. Buildings were often repurposed.

- The Beautiful Orient
- The Flying Horses Carousel
- The Fatal Wedding -- a magic illusion
- William H. Kennedy's Wild West Show and Indian Congress
- The South Before the War
- The Japanese Village'
- The Foolish House/The Third Degree/The House that Jack Built -- A funhouse
- Hale's Tours/The Rocky Mountain Holdup/The World in Motion -- originally a sort of "virtual reality" ride, later a motion picture theater
- Willard's Temple of Music
- The Pilgrim's Progress -- another funhouse
- Under the Sea -- a giant glass-walled tank with swimmers, deep-sea divers, a "human fish", and an escape artist
- Fire and Flames/Fighting the Flames -- a recreation of a city block, populated by actors, was set on fire and the latest fire-fighting gear was used to put out the flames and rescue the people
- Pawnee Bill's Wild West Show
- Paradise -- The Show Beautiful -- a beauty pageant and talent show
- Arcus Ring -- a circus ring with trapezes, high wires, and other fixtures for performers
- Band Stand
- Wild Animal Shows
- The Human Laundry
- Battle Abbey -- historical painting of Civil War battles, with a veteran to explain them
- A Balloon Ride
- Skating Rink
- Miniature Railroad
- Palmists and Astrologers
- Florida Alligator Jungle
- Darktown
