= Bay State Raceway =

Racing track in Foxborough, Massachusetts

Coordinates: 42°5′37.25″N 71°15′45.29″W

Bay State Raceway, later known as New England Harness Raceway, Foxboro Raceway, and Foxboro Park was a harness racing track located in Foxborough, Massachusetts, United States that operated from 1947 until 1997. It stood next to Foxboro Stadium and the site of Gillette Stadium. Track owner E. M. Loew gave the land for Foxboro Stadium to New England Patriots owner Billy Sullivan in order to keep the team in New England.

== Early years ==
Bay State Raceway was founded by movie theatre magnate Elias (E.M.) Loew, Paul Bowser, and Ed Keller. It opened on September 1, 1947. A reported 12,000 people attended the first night of racing. The track's $55,523 handle broke the record for a new track on its first day. When Bay State Raceway opened, it featured many modern amenities, including lights for night racing. However, some of the barns and buildings were still not completed. The remaining structures were finished in time for the 1948 spring racing season.

During the track's heyday, Bay State Raceway drew over 10,000 patrons a night. In 1969, the track had its all-time handle with $737,838. In 1970 the track drew a record crowd of 16,006.

== Foxboro Stadium ==
The AFL–NFL merger in 1970 required that all teams have a stadium with a capacity of 50,000. The only stadium in the Boston area that was large enough was Harvard Stadium, but the university refused to lease it to the Patriots long-term. In anticipation that the Patriots might not be able to secure a stadium, groups from Memphis, Tampa, Seattle, Portland, Birmingham, and Jacksonville made bids for the team. In order to keep the team in New England, Loew offered Patriots owner Billy Sullivan fifteen acres of land adjacent to the track for the construction of a stadium. Sullivan selected Loew's location over sites in Saugus, Sturbridge, Haverhill, and Salem, New Hampshire. Foxboro Stadium (then known as Schaefer Stadium) was completed in time for the 1971 season.

== First closure ==
In 1976, Loew sold the track to Foxboro Associates, led by Eddie Andelman, for $9.6 million. They renamed the track New England Harness Raceway and later Foxboro Raceway. The track closed in December 1989 after Chuck Sullivan (the son of Billy Sullivan), who leased the track from Foxboro Associates, failed to make his payments.

In January 1987, Robert Kraft and Steve Karp purchased an option on the track, which would allow Kraft, who had tried unsuccessfully to purchase the Patriots, to prevent the financially struggling Sullivans from hosting non-Patriot events at the stadium during races. This put Kraft on the inside track to purchase the stadium, which he did in 1988, and eventually the team, which he did in 1994.

== Reopening ==
In 1990, Charles Sarkis, chairman and CEO of the Back Bay Restaurant Group and the owner of Wonderland Greyhound Park, entered an agreement to lease Foxboro Raceway. He hoped to use the track for Thoroughbred racing (which had not been held in Massachusetts since Suffolk Downs closed in 1989) and off-track betting. In November 1991, Foxboro was granted a license to hold Thoroughbred races from May to September and harness races from September to December. The track was upgraded to include a grandstand pub, circle lounge area, new front-stretch chute, two teletheaters, 155 mutuel machines, and 50 Tiny TIM personal betting machines (more than any other U.S. track at that time and the first such machines at any track in New England). The track reopened on May 27, 1992, under the name Foxboro Park. Foxboro Park suffered financially due to an outbreak of an equine virus, a low level of betting, and significant cost overruns during construction. Although the track was granted 72 Thoroughbred racing dates, it was only able to complete 35 due to a lack of horses. The track continued to run harness races.

== Second closure and demolition ==
On May 29, 1996, Patriots owner Robert Kraft purchased Foxboro Park from Andelman's group for $16 million. He planned to use the property as an alternate site for a new football stadium in case plans for the proposed South Boston facility fell through. The purchase also gave Kraft control of access to Foxboro Stadium's parking lots. Kraft bought the property four months after his option on the track expired, which allowed him to buy it without former business partner Steve Karp (who still held the option with Kraft) as well as at a lower price ($16 million instead of $18 million).

Not long after purchasing the Foxboro Park, Kraft moved to evict Sarkis on the grounds that he did not have a valid lease. Although the track was unprofitable, it was potentially worth millions of dollars, as the Massachusetts legislature was considering Governor William Weld's proposal to grant slot licenses to the state's four racetracks. On May 29, 1997, a Norfolk Superior Court judge sided with Kraft. On July 29, Sarkis was ordered to vacate the property by midnight the following day or accept three conditions; create a fund to assist horsemen relocating to other tracks, repay workers who renovated the track, and pay rent, and leave the property on August 25. Sarkis chose to leave immediately.

During his battle with Sarkis, Kraft supported Thomas Aronson, a racing consultant from Virginia, for Foxboro Park's racing license. However, shortly after Sarkis' eviction, Aronson announced that he would not apply for racing dates, citing a "hostile group of regulators" (the Massachusetts Racing Commission) which made it "extremely difficult for [him] to suggest to Foxboro Realty and The Kraft Group that there is good reason to pursue racing at Foxboro". Kraft later backed Foxboro Development Associates Limited Partnership, headed by attorney James Cobery, for the track's license, but the group withdrew its application for racing dates.

After Foxboro Park closed, the track's general manager, Gary Piontkowski, purchased 91 acres in Plainville, Massachusetts for the construction of a harness track. The track opened in 1999 as Plainridge Racecourse.

Foxboro Park remained vacant until 2000, when it was torn down during construction of Gillette Stadium.
