= Henrietta Bowden-Jones =

Medical doctor and academic

- Education: University of Pavia; Doctorate in Medicine Imperial College London; Senior house officer rotation: Charing Cross Training Scheme (Imperial); Specialist registrar rotation: Charing Cross and St Mary's Training Scheme (Imperial)
- Awards: OBE (2019); Royal College of Psychiatrists 'Psychiatrist of the Year' Award; National Health Service Women Leaders Award; National Council on Problem Gambling Joanna Franklin Gambling Treatment Award; Women of Achievement Award Health; Royal College of Psychiatrists Public Educator of the Year Award (finalist); The Times Best Doctors in Britain
- Scientific career
- Workplaces: Honorary senior visiting research fellow in psychiatry 2020–present, Cambridge University; Honorary professor 2019–present, University College London; Honorary clinical senior lecturer 2008–2019, Imperial College London

Henrietta Bowden-Jones (born 27 April 1964) is a British physician and psychiatrist specialising in addiction treatment and research. She is the founder of both the National Problem Gambling Clinic and the National Centre for Gaming Disorders, the first clinics in the United Kingdom dedicated to treating gambling disorder and gaming disorder, respectively. She was appointed an Officer of the Order of the British Empire (OBE) for services to addiction treatment and research.

== Early life and education ==
Bowden-Jones was born in Turin, Italy, to an Italian mother and a British father. She studied medicine at the University of Pavia. She later trained in psychiatry on the Charing Cross Hospital rotation at Chelsea and Westminster Hospital. She earned a Doctor of Medicine (MD) degree in neuroscience at Imperial College London. Her postgraduate research examined the role of the ventromedial prefrontal cortex in alcohol dependency, using computerised neuropsychological assessments, including the Cambridge gamble task.

== Career ==
Bowden-Jones began her career in addiction psychiatry focusing on drug and alcohol dependence. She ran the Soho Rapid Access Clinic for homeless patients with opioid addiction and later led a National Health Service (NHS) inpatient facility in central London for people with alcohol and drug addictions.

She subsequently shifted her focus to behavioural addictions.

In 2008, she founded the National Problem Gambling Clinic and became its director. The centre was the first in the UK dedicated to the treatment of problem gambling and later served as a model for 15 NHS-funded gambling treatment clinics. The same year, she established the Problem Gambling Consortium, a UK-wide collaboration that investigates the neurobiology and clinical characteristics of gambling disorder.

In 2019, with NHS funding, she founded the National Centre for Gaming Disorders, the first NHS centre dedicated to the treatment of gaming disorder following its inclusion in the 11th revision of the International Classification of Diseases (ICD 11).

Bowden-Jones is the director of the NHS-funded Centre for Behavioural Addictions, which includes the National Problem Gambling Clinic and the Centre for Internet and Gaming Disorders. The centre provides treatment and support for individuals impacted by gambling and gaming disorders, as well as their family members. Her approach has been described as "innovative and experimental," particularly for the use of naltrexone and group cognitive behavioral therapy.

She holds several faculty and professional appointments. In 2020, she became an honorary senior visiting fellow in the Department of Psychiatry at the University of Cambridge. There, she co-founded the National UK Behavioural Addictions Research Group, which brings together researchers from fields including neurobiology, epidemiology and clinical research. She is an honorary clinical senior lecturer at Imperial College London and an honorary professor at University College London. She is also a co-opted member of the Faculty of Addictions at the Royal College of Psychiatrists and has served as the college's spokesperson for behavioral addictions.

She has advised on issues related to gambling disorder, gaming disorder and mental health. In 2019, she became an adviser to NHS England on its 10-year Long-Term Plan for Gambling Disorder. In 2021, she was appointed adviser to the All Party Group on Reducing Harm Related to Gambling in Northern Ireland and the Welsh Task and Finish Group on Gambling Harm. In 2023, she was appointed a deputy lieutenant of Greater London to support the Lord Lieutenant and assigned to serve in the Royal Borough of Kensington and Chelsea.

Bowden-Jones is a commissioner for the Howard League Crime and Problem Gambling Commission. Previously, she was a trustee for the Sporting Chance Clinic (2007–2015), Action on Addiction (2017–2020) and the Royal Society of Medicine (2021–2024). She also served as president of the Medical Women's Federation (2018–2020) and the Royal Society of Medicine's Psychiatry Section (2020–2022) and was a member of the Board of Science Committee for the British Medical Association (2021–2024).

=== Awards ===
- 2020 Psychiatrist of the Year, Royal College of Psychiatrists
- 2019 Order of the British Empire
- 2018 National Health Service Women Leaders Award
- 2015 National Council on Problem Gambling Joanna Franklin Gambling Treatment Award
- 2014 Women of Achievement Award in Health Category, Women in the City
- 2014 Royal College of Psychiatrists Public Educator of the Year Award (finalist)
- 2010 The Times Best Doctors in Britain
- 2006 Specialist Clinical Addiction Network Award
- 2003 Imperial College London Hallinan Young Researcher Award

=== Books ===
- 2019 Harm Reduction for Gambling: A Public Health Approach - Routledge
- 2017 Problem Gambling in Women: An International Female Perspective on Treatment and Research - Routledge
- 2017 Are We All Addicts Now? - Liverpool University Press
- 2015 A Clinician's Guide to Working With Problem Gamblers - Routledge
