= Abe Sarkis =

American bookmaker (1913–1991)

Abraham Sarkis
- Born: ابراهيم بشاره ابو سركس; December 9, 1914
- Died: June 5, 1991 (aged 76); Boston, Massachusetts, U.S.
- Occupations: Bookmaker, building contractor

Abraham Bashara Sarkis (December 9, 1914 – June 5, 1991) was an American bookmaker who oversaw Boston's numbers racket for the Patriarca crime family.

== Early life ==
Abraham Bashara Sarkis was born on December 9, 1914 to Bashara Sarkis and Mrs. Hamama, Melkite Catholic immigrants from Aammiq, Lebanon. He attended Everett High School, where he was a member of the school's baseball team. He and his wife, Dorothy, had two children – Charles Sarkis and Dorothy Morkis. In 1940, Sarkis suffered severe cuts when a plate glass window shattered during a two-alarm fire in his apartment building.

== Criminal activity ==
Sarkis' first arrest for bookmaking came in 1935. In 1944, he and nine other were arrested in Lynn, Massachusetts for betting on a licensed boxing exhibition. In 1955, he was summoned to appear before the Massachusetts Crime Commission, but refused to testify.

By 1967, Sarkis was supervising Boston's numbers racket in partnership with Patriarca underboss Gennaro Angiulo. That year, he and his brother, Charles, were arrested on gambling charges at the 411 Lounge, which was managed by Sarkis. In 1968, Sarkis pleaded guilty to tax evasion and was sentenced to nine months in jail. In 1977, he pleaded guilty to bookmaking and was fined $30,000 and sentenced to three years probation. As a condition of his parole, Sarkis was required to work 60 hours a week at the Walter E. Fernald Developmental Center. Following his guilty plea, deputy assistant attorney general Jack Keeney described Sarkis as "one of Boston's largest and most senior gambling ring operators" during a United States Senate Committee on the Judiciary hearing.

The following year, Sarkis was arrested for possession of a handgun. He was given a one-year suspended sentence and two additional years of probation. In 1980, he was arrested for illegal use of a gaming apparatus to register bets. The complaint was dismissed by Judge John A. Pino on the grounds that the prosecution was unprepared to present its case. Later that year, Sarkis, Ilario "Larry Baione" Zannino, Richard Assad, and Edward Lewis were arrested for allegedly running a three-county gambling ring. In 1990, Sarkis and Wonderland Greyhound Park general manager and former Massachusetts State Police head Americo Sousa were indicted for running an illegal bookmaking operation that allegedly took in $100,000 a day in bets on races at the track, which was owned by Sarkis' son. Sarkis died before the case against him could be resolved.

== Attempts on Sarkis' life ==
In 1960, two men, one dressed as priest, arrived at Sarkis' home. His wife saw that one of the men had a gun and alerted her husband, who escaped by jumping out of a second story window. The hit was reportedly ordered by Zannino. In 1979, he was shot in the shoulder by a masked gunman who entered his home through a bedroom window.

== Death ==
Sarkis died on June 5, 1991 at the New England Deaconess Hospital. His funeral service was held at the Cathedral of Our Lady of the Annunciation.
