= Northampton Fair (race track) =

The Northampton Fair was a horse racing track located on the Three County Fairgrounds in Northampton, Massachusetts that opened on Labor Day in 1943. Northampton was part of a six-fair horse racing circuit that also included Marshfield, Topsfield, Berkshire Downs, Great Barrington, and Brockton fairs.

The fair held the last horse race on September 11, 2005, citing competition from the Foxwoods and Mohegan Sun casinos both in Connecticut, decreasing handle, and a shortage of jockeys and horses. The fair continues to operate on the grounds each year as it has since 1818.
