= National Council on Problem Gambling =

National Council on Problem Gambling may refer to:

- National Council on Problem Gambling (Singapore)
- National Council on Problem Gambling (United States)
