= Great Barrington tornado =

1995 tornado in Massachusetts

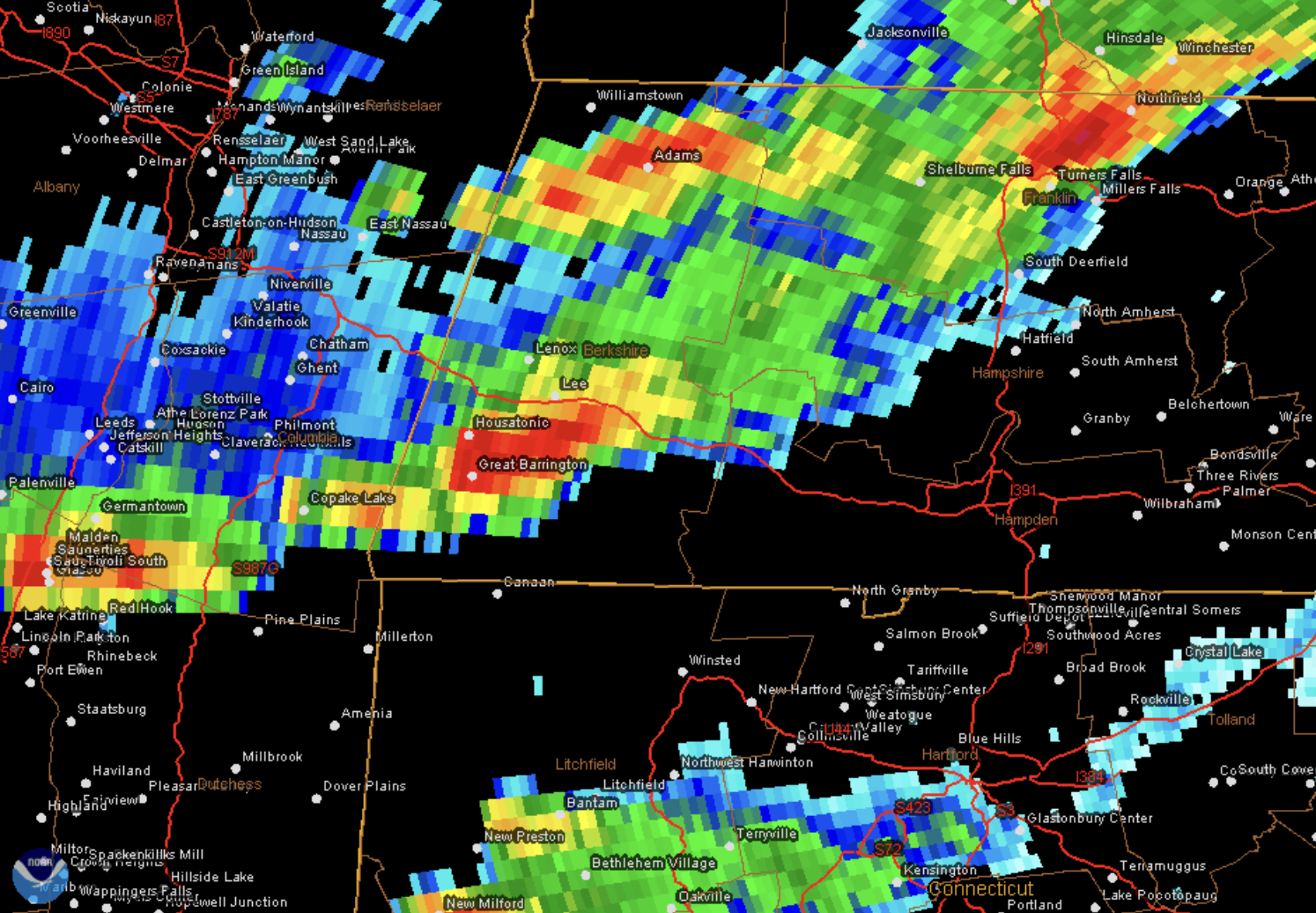
- Radar scan of the supercell at 7:03 p.m.

Meteorological history
- Formed: May 29, 1995, 7:06 p.m. EDT (UTC−04:00)
- Dissipated: May 29, 1995, 7:24 p.m. EDT (UTC−04:00)
- Duration: 18 Minutes

F4 tornado
- on the Fujita scale
- Max width: 300 yd (270 m)
- Path length: 11.5 mi (18.5 km)
- Highest winds: 207 to 260 mph (333 to 418 km/h)

Overall effects
- Fatalities: 3
- Injuries: 24–27
- Damage: $25 million (1995 USD)
- Areas affected: Great Barrington, Massachusetts
- Part of the tornadoes of 1995

The Great Barrington tornado (also known as the Memorial Day Tornado of 1995) was a violent and deadly F4 tornado that occurred in the western Massachusetts town of Great Barrington on May 29, 1995. The tornado remains the last (E)F4 tornado in New England, a streak of over 30 years. It is also one of the deadliest and costliest tornadoes in New England history, causing 3 deaths and $25 million (1995 USD) worth of damage. Due to the unusual strength of the tornado for its location, as well as complex terrain interactions with the Appalachian Mountains, the tornado was the focal point of a 2006 paper researching tornadogenesis over complex terrain.

== Meteorological synopsis ==
In the morning hours of May 29, 1995, a regionally strong, negatively tilted mid-level trough moved through the northeast United States, bringing 60–65-knot (111–120 km/h) mid-level winds to the area. The mid-level trough brought an associated surface low that had developed via lee cyclogenesis the previous day. Due to the surface low over Quebec, moisture surged north, bringing dew points to 65 °F (18 °C). Modest lapse rates resulted in CAPE values in excess of 1000 J/kg, sufficient for storm initiation given the rough terrain.

Around 3:30 p.m. (Eastern Daylight Time) on May 29, 1995, scattered thunderstorms developed over the Western Catskill Mountains of New York. A few were supercellular, producing isolated wind and hail over the next few hours the storms moved east. Meanwhile, low-level winds were intensifying due to the surface low, producing widespread 40 knot winds at 850 mb. As a result, 0-3 km storm-relative helicity values exceeded 150 m^{2}s^{−2} over much of southern New England, with local values likely much higher. However, they failed to become surface-based, likely due to the absence of low-level instability. One thunderstorm however suddenly became surface-based upon crossing the Hudson River Valley, likely due to the presence of greater instability associated with more moist air flowing up the valley from the south as well as locally enhanced wind shear due to numerous outflow boundaries in the area. With a discrete, surface-based supercell in an environment with robust mid-level instability and low-level shear in place, the supercell was primed to produce a tornado. Thanks to the complex terrain, which helps stretch rotating motion vertically, the storm was able to produce its first tornado which touched down in Columbia County at 6:40 p.m., producing F2 damage. The tornado lifted off the ground twenty minutes later as the storm moved past the Taconic Mountains along the New York/Massachusetts border. Shortly after crossing into Massachusetts, the cell entered the Berkshire Mountains, reintroducing surface-level rising motion and spurring tornadogenesis at 7:06 PM EDT.

== Tornado summary ==
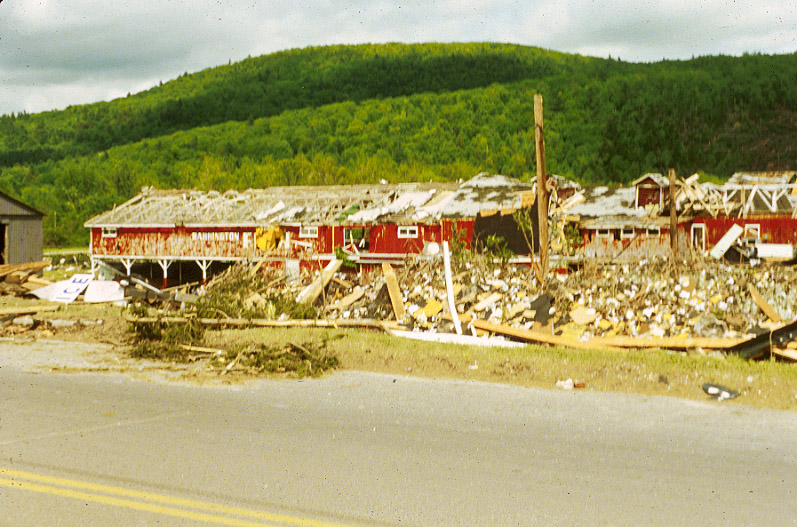
Damage to the Great Barrington Fairgrounds

The tornado touched down around 7:06 p.m. near Prospect Lake in North Egremont, west of Great Barrington. Moving ESE at 40 mph, the tornado crossed Massachusetts Route 41 and U.S. Route 7 just south of downtown Great Barrington. The Great Barrington Fairgrounds were heavily damaged, with winds estimated at 150 mph. Local WSBS newsman Tom Jay reported following the event “The fairgrounds are no more.” Although it was Memorial Day and many residents had the day off, the fairgrounds were vacant, and no injuries were reported. By this time the tornado had become rain-wrapped, obscuring the tornado and leaving the residents with little warning.

The tornado damaged and destroyed scores of homes and buildings in the area before entering East Mountain State Forest, southeast of Great Barrington. A gas station was destroyed, and multiple other buildings were "flattened" around the fairgrounds. Timberlyn Heights, a nursing home with 120 residents, was evacuated when its roof was blown off. A wooden beam was driven through the passenger side of a minivan, leaving a woman with a hip injury. Another vehicle was thrown into a supermarket, causing a large hole in the building.

After traversing the peaks of the forest, the tornado intensified on the lee side of the mountains. According to some sources, the tornado briefly lifted as it reached the apex of the mountain, before touching down again and rapidly intensifying. This rapid intensification was due to the terrain, as the lowered elevation past the peak caused the tornado to stretch vertically, narrowing the wind field and intensifying damage due to conservation of angular momentum. In the state forest, over 1,500 acres of forest were blown down, likely indicating the peak intensity of the tornado. Ski Butternut, a small ski mountain in the forest sustained $2.5 million (1995 USD) worth of damage to lifts, buildings, snowmaking equipment, as well as trees planted to form ski trails.

Near the town line with Monterey, a car was lifted off of Route 23, and tossed 1,000 feet (305 m) into a wooded area. Two students and two staff members at the private Eagleton School, a residential treatment center for boys ages 9–22, were returning to the campus east of Great Barrington. School counselor Seung Choi, who was not wearing a seat belt, was thrown from the car and critically hurt. The other three occupants were seat belted and sustained fatal injuries as the car was thrown by winds estimated at up to 260 mph, the first tornado fatalities in Massachusetts since 1979. The school director, Bruce Bona, found Choi alongside the highway while Choi was looking for the car. The tornado continued doing minor tree damage alongside and south of Route 23, causing the road to be blocked for more than 24 hours. At 7:24 p.m. the tornado lifted near Morley Hill, one and a half miles southwest of West Otis.

In total, more than 100 homes and businesses were either damaged or destroyed, causing $25 million (1995 USD) worth of damage, including the grandstand at the Great Barrington Fairgrounds. Additionally, twenty-four people were injured. 5,000 people in the area were left without power due to the tornado and related storm. The tornado had a length of 11.5 miles (19 km), a maximum width of 300 yd (270 m) and was on the ground for 18 minutes.

== Aftermath ==
A chapel was constructed in the forest where the two students and their teacher passed away during the tornado. The chapel was built by students of the Eagleton School using the trees felled by the tornado, and was used by the school until its closure in 2016. Today, the chapel, named Memorial Chapel A.T. Great Barrington, serves as a rest stop for the nearby Appalachian Trail. In 2000, a plaque was erected by the Great Barrington Historical Society in the local Mahaiwe Cemetery to commemorate the 5 year anniversary of the storm.

Ski Butternut, whose owner had cancelled the property insurance on the mountain to save money during the previous season, was rebuilt with the help of nearby ski areas and a $1.5 million (1995 USD) loan from the Small Business Administration. The mountain was rebuilt in time to open for the 1995-1996 season. Coincidentally, Ski Butternut sustained similar damage and recovery to the nearby Mohawk Mountain Ski Area, which was struck by a tornado in 1989 and was rebuilt.

== Rating controversy ==
The F4 rating was based entirely on the car that was thrown 1,000 feet, as the worst structural damage from this tornado was in the F3 range. Thomas Grazulis recorded the tornado as an F3, in his Significant Tornadoes Update, 1992-1995. In 2024, a group led by Miller et al. ran detailed Monte Carlo simulations on lofted vehicles in tornadoes in order to more accurately determine tornadic wind speeds. The study determined that winds of around 230 mph are required to lift an SUV similar to the one the tornado lofted. This mark would put the tornado firmly in the F4 range, which is between 207 and 260 mph.

== Related research ==
In 2006, Bosart et al. published "Supercell Tornadogenesis over Complex Terrain: The Great Barrington, Massachusetts, Tornado on 29 May 1995," which investigated the formation of supercellular tornadoes over complex terrain, such as the Catskills and Berkshires surrounding Great Barrington. In traditional tornado alley, the American Great Plains, there are very little hills, and as such, tornadoes and their associated supercells do not often interact with complex terrain. The classic rule of thumb is that due to the cooler, more stable air in the mountains, which inhibits the formation of mesocyclones, tornadoes are much less common in complex terrain. However, according to Bosart et al., given sufficient synoptic instability, complex terrain can actually enhance tornado potential.

== See also ==
- Tornadoes of 1995
- List of North American tornadoes and tornado outbreaks
- Worcester tornado
- Windsor Locks tornado
- 2011 Springfield tornado
- May 1995 tornado outbreak sequence
