= Massachusetts Council on Compulsive Gambling =

US private, non-profit health agency

The Massachusetts Council on Gaming and Health is a private, non-profit health agency that was founded in 1983. It provides information, promotes public awareness, and offers community education, professional training, advocacy and referral services for problem gamblers, their loved ones, and the greater community.

== History ==
The Massachusetts Council on Compulsive Gambling was founded in 1983 by Thomas N. Cummings and a small group of others affected by gambling problems. Together, they identified a need for statewide problem-gambling services. Tom served as Executive Director until his passing in January 1998. Today, there is a greater awareness of problem gambling in Massachusetts. The Massachusetts Council provides problem gambling education, trainings and events. There is also access to statewide Department of Public Health problem-gambling treatment facilities throughout Massachusetts. Services provided by the Council include information and public awareness, education and training, advocacy, referral and helpline and prevention programs.

== Services and programs ==
=== Information and public awareness ===
The council works to raise awareness about problem gambling and the programs and services available to help people affected by the disorder. It provides a variety of informative material, from brochures and DVDs to websites, free to the public.

=== Education and training ===
Representatives from the Council offer presentations at schools, businesses, non-profits, and consult on problem gambling policy development and review. They also lead an annual conference, regional trainings, and online trainings. Trainings aim to increase current substance abuse and mental health clinicians' skills in clinical interventions, addictions treatment, and case management for people experiencing gambling disorders.

=== Advocacy ===
The council works towards responsible public policy guidelines for responsible state-supported gambling. It advocates for services for problem gamblers, their families, and the greater community. It started with the 1987 legislation that provided funding for the council. In 1987 there was only 1 treatment site available for those affected by problem gambling, as of 2012, there were 14 sites. The Council formed the Massachusetts Partnership for Responsible Gambling in 2010. It also worked with the National Council on Problem Gambling to advocate for the Comprehensive Problem Gambling Act of 2009 with federal legislative offices and key Massachusetts stakeholders.

=== Referral/Helpline ===
Set up in 1987, the helpline has provided free, live, confidential and anonymous caller responses 24 hours a day, 7 days a week. Council staff members are equipped to offer information and referrals for self-help, treatment providers and other community resources to people experiencing problems with gambling. They are free and are offered in English, Chinese, Vietnamese, Khmer, and Spanish.

=== Prevention ===
The Council increased its focus on prevention initiatives in 2007, bringing together community, faith, and educational institutions to strengthen the prevention of problem gambling efforts in at-risk communities. The council has developed special prevention programs for African American, Latino American and Asian Americans, older adults, youth and college students.

== Impact ==
The council has advocated for treatment for problem gamblers that has resulted in a progression of treatment availability in Massachusetts and the development and implementation of a plan that integrates gambling treatment throughout the substance abuse delivery system.

Since 1987 the council has answered over 37,000 calls and referred more than 32,000 people to treatment services. Since 1983, the council has generated and contributed to more than 1,950 media stories on problem gambling.

== Prevalence ==
Research has estimated the number of U.S citizens who gamble as well as the number who experience pathological and sub-clinical pathological gambling:

- Gambling rates: research has estimated that nearly 80% of U.S. population has gambled during his or her lifetime.
- Pathological and sub-clinical pathological gambling rates: research has estimated that approximately 0.42–0.6% or the U.S. population have experienced pathological gambling in their lifetime, and 0.9–2.3% have experienced sub-clinical pathological gambling in their lifetimes. The Mass. Council recognizes that approximately 2–3% of the population has experienced disordered gambling in their lifetimes.
- Pathological and problem gambling in Massachusetts: based on national estimates, between 85,000 and 185,000 Massachusetts residents likely have experienced disordered gambling during their lifetimes.

The 2–3% lifetime prevalence rate estimate of disordered gambling is significant. Research has estimated the lifetime prevalence rates of other equally serious public health disorders. Listed below are some substance use and mental health disorders with rate estimates that are relatively close to the rate estimates of disordered gambling:

- Opioid use disorder (e.g., Oxycontin, morphine): 1.4%
- Cocaine use disorder: 2.8%
- Amphetamine use disorder (e.g., methamphetamine): 2%
- Antisocial personality disorder: 3.6%
- Obsessive-compulsive disorder: 1.6%
- Schizophrenic disorders: 0.6%
- Anorexia nervosa: 0.6%
- Bulimia nervosa: 1%

== See also ==
- National Council on Problem Gambling
