= 2008 Massachusetts Question 1 =

Question 1
- State Income Tax Repeal

Results
Choice	Votes	%
Yes	914,420	30.63%
No	2,070,699	69.37%
Valid votes	2,985,119	100.00%
Invalid or blank votes	0	0.00%
Total votes	2,985,119	100.00%

No
90–100%
80–90%
70–80%
60–70%
50–60%
Yes
80–90%
70–80%
60–70%
50–60%
Other
No votes

The State Income Tax Repeal, also known as Massachusetts Question 1, was one of the 2008 ballot measures that appeared on the November 4, 2008 ballot in the U.S. state of Massachusetts. Voters were asked whether or not they approved of the proposed measure which, if it had passed, would have ended the 5.3% income tax in Massachusetts on wages, interest, dividends and capital gains. Ultimately, Massachusetts voters defeated Question 1 by a wide margin, with approximately 70% opposed versus 30% in favor.

== Specific provisions ==
This proposed law would have had the following features:

- Reduction of the state personal income tax rate to 2.65% for all categories of taxable income for the tax year beginning on or after January 1, 2009.
- Elimination of the tax for all tax years beginning on or after January 1, 2010.
- The personal income tax to which the initiative would have applied would have been the 'income received or gain realized by individuals and married couples, by estates of deceased persons, by certain trustees and other fiduciaries, by persons who are partners in and receive income from partnerships, by corporate trusts, and by persons who receive income as shareholders of "S corporations" as defined under federal tax law.'
- The proposed law would not have affected the tax due on income or gain realized in a tax year beginning before January 1, 2009.
- The proposed law states that if any of its parts were declared invalid, the other parts would stay in effect.

== Supporters of the income tax repeal ==
The official proponent of the measure was the Committee for Small Government. Michael Cloud and Carla Howell led the committee.

Initiative supporter Michael Cloud believed that the measure would lower the budget from about $28 billion to $17 billion, which is approximately the size of the 1995 state budget.

Polling showed that 46 percent of those asked supported the measure before hearing any of its details, and 40 percent still supported it after hearing about the measure in depth.

=== Arguments that were presented in support of Question 1 ===
- Total state government spending is in excess of $47.3 billion. Total state revenues are in excess of $47.3 billion. The income tax is less than 27% of the state government's revenue.
- Municipal (city and town) government spending is more than $22 billion on top of state government spending, bringing total government spending in Massachusetts to nearly $70 billion. The income tax is only 17% of total government spending.
- Waste, fraud and abuse as exposed in the media nearly every day are only the tip of the garbage heap; when polled, voters estimated government waste at 41%. An informal poll of government employees estimated waste at 50%.
- State politicians have not kept faith with their promises to taxpayers. The Massachusetts State Legislature blockaded a ballot question approved by the citizens of the commonwealth in 2000 that would have reduced the state income tax to 5%.
- 3.4 million Massachusetts taxpayers would get back an average of $3,700 each annually.
- People would find the Bay State a more attractive place to live, work, invest, and raise families.
- From 1991 to 2007 more than 550,000 people moved out of Massachusetts, ranking the commonwealth as the 2nd worst state in the US in terms of population loss.

=== Funding ===
According to campaign finance reports, as of November 1, 2008 the Committee for Small Government had raised approximately $385,000 since creation and had $14,131.72 cash left. They also had about $80,000 in outstanding liabilities.

As of August 15, 2008, Ms Howell and Mr Cloud had paid themselves almost $200,000 from committee donations for "consulting fees" over the previous 6 years for services rendered to their own campaigns while soliciting donors for additional contributions because the campaign was out of funds.

=== Earlier attempt to repeal income tax ===
The Committee for Small Government advanced a similar initiative, called the Massachusetts End the Income Tax initiative, in 2002. That measure did not pass and received 885,683 votes, or 45.3 percent.

=== Individual Support ===
The Republican senatorial candidate, Jeff Beatty, said that he supported Question 1 while challenging incumbent-John Kerry.

=== Editorial Support ===
Stephen Moore of the Wall Street Journal stated: "The forces of the tax-and-spend status quo will descend on this initiative like British troops after the original Boston tea party, but somebody has to make an effort to stop the relentless growth of government."

Steve Forbes of Forbes magazine stated: "This is an attack on political establishments there and throughout the U.S. that routinely put their own interests above those of their constituents: lavish government pensions with payouts that would bankrupt private companies; resistance to genuine reform in Medicaid spending, which has become the biggest item on virtually every state's budget; ever more pork-barrel spending; and ever more obsequiousness to rapacious special interests. Bay State voters – go for Proposition 1."

== Opposition ==
=== Funding ===
According to campaign finance reports, as of October 15, 2008 the Coalition for Our Communities, the organization opposing this tax cut, had raised over $5 million—99.8% from teachers' and other government sector unions.

=== Individual opponents ===
Michael Widmer, president of the Massachusetts Taxpayers Foundation,

Gov. Deval Patrick

The Selectman in the town of Wayland voted unanimously to oppose the initiative.

State Rep. Tom Conroy, D-Wayland

Senator John Kerry (D-MA) publicly opposed it while running for reelection for senate.

Republican State Senator and future U.S. senator Scott Brown voted against Question 1 despite voting against raising the state's flat tax to 5.95% while in the state senate in 2003.

=== Organizations against the measure ===
Coalition for Our Communities, an organization created by the Massachusetts AFL-CIO that reportedly had $1.34 million with which to mount an effort to defeat the measure. The Coalition's funds are derived mainly from unions, including $750,000 from the National Education Association. The group also received $250,000 from American Federation of Teachers Solidarity Fund. Both the NEA and the AFTSF are based in Washington, D.C.

=== Editorial opposition ===
The Boston Globe officially asked voters to vote "no" on Question 1.

=== Arguments that were presented against Question 1 ===
- Massachusetts would lose about 40% of its income and would deal an $11 billion blow to the state, which would have adverse effects throughout state government.
- It would put education, health care, public safety and infrastructure at risk.
- Mass Municipal Association, representing all 351 towns, estimated cuts in local aid as approximately $3 Billion.
- Proponents have not specified any specific cuts that could be made that approach 40% of state revenue.

=== Funding ===
According to campaign finance reports, as of November 1, 2008 The Coalition for Our Communities had raised approximately $6,625,000 since creation and had $117,270.95 cash left. They also received about an additional $650,000 in in-kind donations from unions such as donated staff, supplies, postage etc.

== History of petition drive and blocking allegations ==
The proponents submitted about 100,000 signatures to the Massachusetts Secretary of State for the first phase of signature collection. 76,084 of those signatures were determined to be valid, with a requirement that 66,593 must be valid for the initiative to proceed to the next step. The next step was for the Massachusetts State Legislature to take up the measure. They declined to pass it by the first Wednesday in May 2008, meaning that the proponents had to collect an additional 11,099 valid signatures by June 18, 2008. On July 3, it was announced that 15,913 additional certified signatures had been filed, making the measure extremely likely to appear on the ballot.

The Massachusetts Teachers Association, whose mailing address is the same as the "Committee for our Communities", admitted in December 2007 that it had made phone calls to people who had signed the petition to place the income tax repeal on the ballot, inquiring about whether their signatures were valid. The calls were made from a group identifying itself as the "Committee for our Communities".

== Results ==
State Income Tax Repeal Initiative
Choice	Votes	%
For	914,420	30.63
Against	2,070,699	69.37
Total	2,985,119	100.00
Valid votes	2,985,119	96.20
Invalid/blank votes	117,876	3.80
Total votes	3,102,995	100.00
Registered voters/turnout	4,220,488	73.52

== See also ==
- Massachusetts 2008 ballot measures
