= Charles Sarkis =

American restaurateur and dog racetrack owner (1940–2018)

Charles Frederick Sarkis (January 30, 1940 – March 11, 2018) was an American restaurateur and dog racetrack owner who founded the Back Bay Restaurant Group and owned Wonderland Greyhound Park.

== Early life ==
Sarkis was raised in Milton, Massachusetts. His father, Abe Sarkis, was a well-known Boston bookmaker. His sister, Dorothy Morkis, was an equestrian who competed in the 1976 Summer Olympics. Sarkis received a bachelor's degree in business from Georgetown University and a master's in business from Boston College. While at Georgetown, Sarkis witnessed the gentrification of the Georgetown neighborhood and was inspired to do the same in Back Bay.

== Business career ==
=== Back Bay Restaurant Group ===
In 1964, Sarkis purchased Boraschi's restaurant in Boston. In 1968, he opened his second restaurant, Charley's, on Newbury Street. In 1992 he spun off his restaurant business into the Back Bay Restaurant Group, which went public at $17 a share. By 1999 the company stock had dropped to $3.50 a share and Sarkis took the company private for $38 million. By 2002, Back Bay Restaurant Group consisted of 35 restaurants on the East Coast, including the Abe & Louie's, J.C. Hillary's, Atlantic Fish Co., Coach Grill, Joe's American Bar & Grill, and Papa Razzi chains.

In 2011, Sarkis sold 33 of his restaurants, which included 15 Joe's American Bar & Grill locations, 12 Papa Razzi restaurants and his flagship enterprise, Abe & Louie's to the Tavistock Restaurants, LLC. In March 2012 he sold seven Papa Razzi locations to the Newport Harbor Group. In December 2013, he closed his final two Massachusetts restaurants, Papa Razzi and Joe's American Bar and Grill in Hanover. His two remaining restaurants, both located in New Jersey, were closed at the end of March 2018.

=== Wonderland Greyhound Park ===
In 1977, Sarkis purchased Wonderland Greyhound Park for $1.7 million. In 1990, 40 people, including Sarkis' father and Wonderland's general manager, were indicted on charges of running an illegal gaming operation at the track. Sarkis was not charged in the case however, according to him "I think Wonderland always tarnished [my record]...It is what it is. My father was my father." When Sarkis' restaurant business went public in 1992, he stepped away from the track's day-to-day operations, but remained its majority shareholder and chairman. Commercial dog racing was made illegal by the Massachusetts Greyhound Protection Act, a 2008 ballot measure that passed 56% to 44%. Live races ended at the Wonderland Greyhound Park on September 18, 2009, and the park closed its doors on August 19, 2010, laying off the remaining 75–80 workers.

=== Foxboro Park ===
In 1990, Sarkis, entered an agreement to lease Foxboro Raceway from a group run by Eddie Andelman. He hoped to use the track for Thoroughbred racing (which had not been held in Massachusetts since Suffolk Downs closed in 1989), off-track betting, and harness racing. He upgraded the track to include a grandstand pub, circle lounge area, new front-stretch chute, two teletheaters, 155 mutuel machines, and 50 personal betting machines (more than any other U.S. track at that time and the first such machines at any track in New England). The track reopened on May 27, 1992, under the name Foxboro Park. Foxboro Park was unprofitable due to an outbreak of an equine virus, a low level of betting, and significant cost overruns during construction. In 1996, New England Patriots owner Robert Kraft purchased the track and moved to evict Sarkis on the grounds that he did not have a valid lease. On July 29, 1997, Sarkis was ordered to vacate the property.

== Personal life ==
In 1964, Sarkis married Nancy Hennessey. The couple had six children. They divorced in 1998. The following year, Sarkis married Fortune president and publisher Jolene Sykes. The couple resided in Palm Beach, Florida.

In September 1995, Sarkis was diagnosed with a brain tumor. He chose a successor and announced his illness to employees and investors. He underwent surgery the following month to extract the tumor, which was found to be benign. After a few months of chemotherapy, radiation, and other treatments, Sarkis was able to return to work.

As part of Bay Back Restaurant Group's sale to Tavistock, Tavistock required that Sarkis' three children that worked for Bay Back Restaurant Group sign noncompete clauses. All three refused and Sarkis moved against them. One son, who had been effectively running the company, quit after his father threatened to fire him. Sarkis also suspended a daughter from her job without pay and sought to have another son removed from his position on the Back Bay Architectural Commission.

In 2010, Sarkis suffered a reoccurrence of his brain tumor. He died on March 11, 2018, of complications from brain cancer. He was 78 years old. Following his death, the remains of the Back Bay Restaurant Group were shut down for good.
