= 2008 Massachusetts Question 2 =

Question 2
- Sensible Marijuana Policy Initiative

Results
Choice	Votes	%
Yes	1,949,704	65.25%
No	1,038,523	34.75%
Total votes	2,988,227	100.00%

Yes
80–90%
70–80%
60–70%
50–60%
No
60–70%
50–60%
Other
No votes

The Sensible Marijuana Policy Initiative, also known as Massachusetts Ballot Question 2, was an initiated state statute that replaced prior criminal penalties with new civil penalties on adults possessing an ounce or less of marijuana. The initiative appeared on the November 4, 2008, ballot in Massachusetts.

The measure was passed on Nov 4. and became public law on January 2, 2009

Question 2:

- Replaced criminal penalties with a US$100 fine of which the proceeds go to the city where the offense takes place.
- Eliminated the collection of Criminal Offender Record Information (CORI) reports for minor marijuana related infractions.
- Maintained then-current penalties for selling, growing, and trafficking marijuana, as well as the prohibition against driving under the influence of marijuana.
- The law requires additional penalties for minors such as Parental notification, compulsory drug awareness program, and 10 hours community service that was not required under prior law. It also requires a larger US$1,000 fine and possible delinquency proceedings for those under 17 if they do not complete the requirements of the law.

The law represents a break with prior law in Massachusetts, where people charged with marijuana possession faced criminal penalties of up to six months in jail and a US$500 fine, as well as a CORI report being filed.

On Tuesday, September 10, 2008, a city councillor in Worcester called for a vote on a measure to express the opposition by the city of Worcester to the initiative. The city council rejected and voted down the measure by a 10-1 vote, with the only vote for the measure coming from the councillor that requested the vote.

== Supporters ==
The Committee for Sensible Marijuana Policy was the leading proponent of the initiative.

=== Organizations ===
- National Association of Social Workers—Massachusetts Chapter
- Greater Boston Civil Rights Coalition
- Criminal Justice Policy Coalition
- American Civil Liberties Union — National
- Law Enforcement Against Prohibition
- American Civil Liberties Union — Massachusetts chapter
- National Organization for the Reform of Marijuana Laws
- Massachusetts Cannabis Reform Coalition, Inc. (aka "MassCann")
- Univ. of Massachusetts, Amherst Cannabis Reform Coalition (not part of prev. listed group, "MassCann")
- Union of Minority Neighborhoods
- The Boston Worker's Alliance
- Marijuana Policy Project
- Brookline Police Department

=== Individuals ===
- Paul T. Breeden - President/CEO Boston Live Magazine/Boston Live Charity Fund Inc.
- Ronald Ansin, ACLU, philanthropist
- Charles H. Baron, Esq., Boston College School of Law
- Jack Cole, Law Enforcement Against Prohibition
- Michael D. Cutler, Esq.
- Richard Elliott Doblin, PhD, MAPS
- Sergeant Howard Donohue, a 33-year veteran of the Boston Police Department
- Lester Grinspoon, M.D., associate professor emeritus of psychiatry at Harvard Medical School
- John H. Halpern, M.D., assistant professor of psychiatry at Harvard Medical School
- Massachusetts state Sen. Patricia Jehlen (D-Second Middlesex), chair of the Joint Committee on Elder Affairs and Vice-Chair of the Joint Committee on State Administration and Regulatory Oversight
- Wendy Kaminer, Esq., ACLU, author, journalist
- Woody Kaplan, ACLU, philanthropist
- Thomas R. Kiley, Esq., Cosgrove, Eisenberg & Kiley
- Karen Klein, Brandeis University, Unitarian Universalists for Drug Policy Reform
- Lanny Kutakoff, Partakers, Inc.
- Dr. Robert Meenan, dean of the Boston University School of Public Health
- Lieutenant Thomas Nolan, a 30-year veteran of the Boston Police Department who now teaches criminology at Boston University
- Massachusetts state Rep. Frank Smizik (D-Fifteenth Norfolk), chair of the Joint Committee on Environment, Natural Resources and Agriculture
- Carl Valvo, Esq., Cosgrove, Eisenberg & Kiley
- Ernest "Tony" Windsor, Esq., Massachusetts Law Reform Institute
- George Soros - Hedge Fund Manager
- Massachusetts State Rep. Jim O'Day (D-fourteenth Worcester)

=== Religious Leaders ===
- Rev. Jean Alexander, Auburndale
- Rabbi Alan Alpert, Leominster
- Rev. Molly Baskette, Somerville
- Father Richard Beaulieu, Winchester
- Rev. Jim Bronwell, Barre
- Rev. Suzanne Brunnquell, Pittsfield
- Rev. Sarah Buteux, Amherst
- Rev. Dr. Jan Carlsson-Bull, Cohasset
- Rev. Thomas Carlton, Ludlow
- Rev. Stephen Cook
- Father Richard Crowley, Middleboro
- Rev. C. Edward Deyton, Andover
- Father Thomas Dilorenzo, Winthrop
- Rev. Jonathan Drury, Andover
- Rev. Leigh Dry, Hopkinton
- Rev. Kathrene Duhon, Great Barrington
- Rev. Lisa Durkee Abbott, West Brookfield
- Rev. Dr. Dorothy May Emerson, Billerica
- Rev. Marc Fredette, Waltham
- Rev. Tamarack Garlow, Ashley Falls
- Rev. John Gibbons, Bedford
- Rev. Jamie Green, West Groton
- Rev. Edward Hardy, Abington
- Rev. William Hobbs, Athol
- Rev. Dr. Anne Ierardi, Yarmouthport
- Ms. Marion Jansen, Great Barrington
- Rev. David Johnson, Plymouth
- Rev. Bill Leggett, Milford
- Father John Lis, Williamsburg
- Rev. Jeffrey Long-Middleton, Acton
- Rev. Ian Lynch, Brimfield
- Rev. Art McDonald, Essex
- Rabbi Richard Messing, North Easton
- Rev. Stephen Philbrick, Cummington
- Rev. Susie Phoenix, Lee
- Rev. Katherine Reis, Rockport
- Rev. Edmund Robinson, Chatham
- Rev. Ken Sawyer, Wayland
- Rev. Dr. Victor Scalise, Somerville
- Rev. Warren Scamman, Windsor
- Rev. Richard Schlak, Foxboro
- Rev. Stephen Shick, Hudson
- Rev. Judith Smith-Valley, Brewster
- Rev. Paul Sprecher, Hingham
- Rev. C. William Steelman, Nantucket
- Rev. Rachel Tedesco, Taunton
- Rev. Jonathan Tetherly, Chicopee
- Rev. Patricia Tummino, Middleboro
- Rabbi Andrew Vogel, Brookline
- Rev. Vicki Woods, Worcester
- Rev. Dr. Judith Wright, Boylston

=== Newspaper Editorial endorsements ===
- The Daily Free Press
- The Bay state Banner
- The Harvard Crimson
- The Newton TAB
- The Milford Daily News
- The Springfield Republican
- The Metrowest Daily News
- The Daily News Tribune
- The Brookline TAB
- The Fall River Herald News
- The Danvers Herald
- MIT Tech

=== Polls ===
A Suffolk University / WHDH Channel 7 poll has shown that 72 percent of Greater Boston residents are in favor of replacing criminal penalties with civil fines for carrying an ounce or less of marijuana. "The public may be signaling that pursuing small-time marijuana users is a waste of taxpayer resources," said David Paleologos, director of the Political Research Bureau at Suffolk University. "This issue suggests there is a libertarian streak in the thinking of the Massachusetts voter." The poll was conducted with 400 residents between July 31 and August 3, 2008.

A FastTrack poll by WBZ TV /Survey USA on September 17 showed that 69% of all Massachusetts voters would favor either decriminalization or legalization. It was broken down to 30% want it remain a crime, 31% want it changed to a civil fine and 38% would like it to be legalized completely. The poll had a margin of error of 4.5%.

=== Arguments in favor ===
Supporting arguments advanced by the proponents include:

- It would save Massachusetts US$130 million per year, according to a 2002 report by Harvard economist Jeffrey Miron.
- Instances of minor marijuana possession would no longer affect if people can obtain jobs, housing, and student loans.
- Currently there are about 2.8 million CORI records on file for a population of 6 million.
- Small convictions have been shown to have little or no impact on drug use.

=== History ===
The National Commission on Marijuana and Drug Abuse (also known as the Shafer Commission) was created by Public Law 91-513 in 1972 to study marijuana abuse in the United States. It published its findings in a report called Marihuana: A Signal of Misunderstanding and recommended that the president should decriminalize possession of marijuana in amounts that constituted "simple possession".

So far 30 non-binding public policy questions calling for civil fines for possession of marijuana rather than criminal penalties have passed in legislative districts throughout Massachusetts since 2000. These questions were passed with an average of 62% of the vote in favor. No Public policy question related to replacing criminal penalties with civil fines has ever failed in the state of Massachusetts.

The Joint Mental Health and Substance Abuse Committee of the Massachusetts General Court voted 6-1 in favor of a bill that would have made possession of less than an ounce of marijuana punishable by a civil fine.

=== Funding ===
Billionaire George Soros made an initial contribution of $400,000. The committee has also received $750,000 cash as well as about $320,000 in donated time and services from the Marijuana Policy Project, an organization created to reform marijuana laws in the United States. According to campaign finance reports, as of November 1, 2008, the committee has raised approximately $1,250,000 to help pass the measure with $40,060.90 remaining.

== Opposition ==
The Coalition for Safe Streets, a committee organized to oppose Question 2, launched a statewide campaign Sept. 5 to defeat the measure. Jonathan W. Blodgett, the Essex County District Attorney serves as the Coalition's treasurer and chairman.

Michael O'Keefe, the president of the Massachusetts District Attorneys Association, is opposed to the initiative. He believes that the measure will lead to an increase in minors using the drug by sending the wrong message to them.

The O'Keefe Committee is one of ten committees representing district attorneys in Massachusetts that have contributed to the Coalition.

William Breault, chairman of the Main South Alliance for Public Safety in Worcester, also plans to oppose this initiative.

=== Funding ===
According to Campaign Finance reports, as of November 1, 2008, the ten committees representing district attorneys in Massachusetts have contributed approximately $2,275 each to the Coalition along with a donation of $2,500 from the Worcester County Deputy Sheriffs Association as well as a few other donors for a total of approx $60,000, after expenditures they have $0 to fight the initiative and $2,601.92 in outstanding liabilities.

== Controversies ==
On September 17, 2008, the Committee for Sensible Marijuana Policy filed complaints with the Office of Campaign and Political Finance and the Attorney General's office against the Massachusetts District Attorney Association, the 11 state district attorneys and O'Neill and Associates, a Boston public relations firm. Violations of the campaign finance law could result in up to 1 year in jail and a $1,000 fine.

Also, Middlesex District Attorney Gerry Leone has stated that in the event the majority of voters in the State of Massachusetts were to pass the initiative, he will attempt to override the vote and defeat it in an appellate process.

=== Alleged Complaints ===
- Under Massachusetts law, it is illegal to solicit, receive, or spend funds to support or oppose a ballot initiative without first forming a political committee. CSMP alleges that the district attorneys solicited, received, and spent donations before they were legally allowed to, attempting to conceal their campaign activity for as long as they could.
- CSMP further alleges that the district attorneys used public funds to post and house a statement urging voters to reject the decriminalization initiative on its Web site, a violation of Massachusetts election law, which prohibits public officials from using public resources to advocate for or against a ballot initiative. The statement on the state run Massachusetts District Attorneys Association website says that if the question is approved, "any person may carry and use marijuana at any time," which is untrue.

== Petition drive to qualify ==
The support group collected over 105,000 signatures, far exceeding the requirement of 66,593 valid signatures. Since Massachusetts is an indirect initiative state, this meant that the Massachusetts State Legislature had to take up the proposed measure. Since the legislature declined to act on it by early May, the supporters then had until June 18, 2008, to collect another 11,099 signatures to ensure that the initiative is placed on the November 2008 statewide ballot, a goal at which they succeeded.

== Results ==
Sensible Marijuana Policy Initiative
Choice	Votes	%
For	1,949,704	65.25
Against	1,038,523	34.75
Total	2,988,227	100.00
Valid votes	2,988,227	96.30
Invalid/blank votes	114,768	3.70
Total votes	3,102,995	100.00
Registered voters/turnout	4,220,488	73.52

== Enactment ==
As per Massachusetts law, the initiative became public law on January 2, 2009, 30 days from the date it was presented to the Governor's Council and certified.

== See also ==
- Massachusetts 2008 ballot measures
- Personal Use of Marijuana by Responsible Adults Act of 2008
