= Committee for Sensible Marijuana Policy =

Boston, Massachusetts based organization

- Purpose: Massachusetts Sensible Marijuana Policy Initiative
- Location: Boston
- Website: Official website

The Committee for Sensible Marijuana Policy is a Boston, Massachusetts based organization that was devoted to passing Question 2, a cannabis decriminalization initiative also known as the Massachusetts Sensible Marijuana Policy Initiative that was passed in Massachusetts in 2008 and officially became law on January 2, 2009. Whitney A. Taylor is the treasurer and chairwoman of the organization.

== Efforts to enact ==
The committee collected over 100,000 signatures in the first stage of getting the measure enacted. Because the Massachusetts legislature declined to take action, On May 7, the committee began the second stage of the signature drive, which required another 11,099 valid signatures from residents of the commonwealth. And prior to the June 18 deadline for this second stage, they turned in over 20,000 raw signatures, more than the total needed to qualify for the ballot. The secretary of state subsequently accepted and assigned the measure as Ballot Question 2 for 2008.

== Finances ==
Philanthropist George Soros made an initial contribution of $400,000. The committee has also received $750,000 cash as well as about $320,000 in donated time and services from the Marijuana Policy Project, an organization created to reform cannabis laws in the United States. According to campaign finance reports, as of November 1, 2008 the committee has raised approximately US$1,250,000 to help pass the measure with $40,060.90 remaining.

== See also ==
- Massachusetts Sensible Marijuana Policy Initiative
- Coalition for Rescheduling Cannabis
