= Plainridge Park Casino =

Massachusetts racetrack (1999–), casino (2015–)

Coordinates: 42°2′2.04″N 71°18′8.78″W

- Interactive map of Plainridge Park Casino
- Location: Plainville, Massachusetts
- Owned by: Gaming and Leisure Properties
- Operated by: Penn Entertainment
- Date opened: March 17, 1999 (track); June 24, 2015 (casino)
- Race type: Harness racing
- Course type: Flat
- Live racing handle: $1.5 million (2011)

Plainridge Park Casino is a harness racing track and slot machine parlor in Plainville, Massachusetts. It is owned by Gaming and Leisure Properties and operated by Penn Entertainment. It opened in 1999 as Plainridge Racecource, changing to its present name in 2015 when it became a racino.

== History ==
=== Background and license (1990s) ===
In 1997, Massachusetts's only harness racing track, Foxboro Park, was closed after a legal dispute between its owner, Robert Kraft, and its operator, Charles Sarkis. Two competing plans to resurrect the sport were soon brought before the Massachusetts Racing Commission, with Kraft seeking to reopen Foxboro under a new operator, while Gary Piontkowski, who had managed Foxboro under Sarkis, proposed to build a new track at a 90-acre site in Plainville. Kraft withdrew his application weeks later, however, leaving Piontkowski as harness racing's only hope in the state.

The Racing Commission issued a conditional license for Piontkowski's proposed track in November 1997, with a targeted opening date of May 1998. Piontkowski would purchase the land for $4.5 million, and buy an existing 40,000-square-foot building to use as the grandstand. The project would be financed by an $11 million loan from Cornerstone Capital.

Piontkowski's application ran into trouble when the Commission found that Cornerstone had never actually committed to the loan, and that Piontkowski might have used a loan broker who had since been imprisoned for bank fraud. The project was nevertheless granted a two-month extension of its financing deadline, raising criticism that commissioners were being too lenient with Piontkowski, who had previously served as the Racing Commission's chairman. By April 1998, the commission approved a new financing plan, with ownership of the track to be shared by nine investors, with Piontkowski holding a 15% share.

In May 1998, a neighboring landowner filed a lawsuit seeking to nullify the track's building permit, prompting Piontkowski to suspend construction and push back the track's debut to the next season. The lawsuit was later settled out of court.

A new application was filed in October 1998, under which the purchase of the land and construction of the track would be financed by real estate developer Lou Giuliano, who would lease the track to Piontkowski's company for $1 million per year. The Racing Commission approved the license in November.

=== Opening (1999) ===
The track opened for simulcast wagering on March 17, 1999, and held its first day of live racing a month later on April 19.

Plainridge Racecourse faced criticism from the beginning, with industry observers and Racing Commission chair Robert Hutchinson arguing that the track's live racing schedule was nothing but an excuse to justify a lucrative off-track betting operation and a potential racino; a large room in the grandstand was set aside for the installation of as many as 400 slot machines.

Around July 1999, a rift grew between Piontkowski and Giuliano over management of the track. Giuliano then applied for a license to operate the track himself in 2000, claiming that Piontkowski's lease was valid only until December 31, 1999. The commission found that Giuliano did not actually own the land, but only held an option to buy it from a Boston investment company, Realty Financial Partners (RFP), which had financed the purchase. Piontkowski's company was approved to retain the license, subject to the condition that it obtain financing to buy the track from RFP. After Giuliano failed to exercise his option to buy the track, RFP claimed control and served an eviction notice on Piontkowski. A deal was soon reached for Piontkowski's group to buy Plainridge from RFP for $13.6 million, to be partially financed by Anchor Gaming. The sale was completed in May 2000.

In the wake of their dispute, Piontkowski and Giuliano filed dozens of lawsuits against of each other, with proceedings lasting through 2005. Giuliano initiated multiple attempts to develop a nearby competing harness racing track, none of them successful.

=== Addition of slot machines ===
Piontkowski consistently supported proposed legislation to authorize slot machines at the state's four racetracks, touting plans for a $180-million expansion of Plainridge. Discussions were held with major gaming companies about developing a casino at the track, but the site was seen as having limited potential due to its proximity to the Mashpee Wampanoag Tribe, who were likely to develop a casino under any expanded gambling regimen. In 2008, Piontkowski was credited with killing a casino bill pushed by Governor Deval Patrick because it had no provision for racinos.

In 2011, the state finally enacted casino legislation, authorizing up to three resort-style casinos and one slots-only facility. The slot parlor provision originated as a compromise between House Speaker Robert DeLeo, a staunch advocate of racinos, and Governor Patrick, who opposed allowing slot machines at racetracks without a competitive bidding process. Plainridge was the state's first gaming applicant, submitting its $400,000 application fee as soon as the process opened. Piontkowski stated that the track could not continue live racing without the additional revenue of slot machines; one of the track's owners said the site could otherwise be redeveloped as a shopping center.

The track began construction of a 1,000-car parking garage in late 2012, hoping to demonstrate to the Gaming Commission that its proposal would be the quickest to open and begin generating tax revenue.

In early 2013, state investigators found that Piontkowski had taken over $1 million in cash from the track's money room over the years; the distributions were recorded on the company books, but had not been approved by the track's majority owners. As a result, the owners pushed Piontkowski out as president, and bought out his shares. The track's new president vowed to change the organization's "culture", but the Gaming Commission called the changes "way too little, way too late", and disqualified Plainridge's application for a gaming license in August 2013.

New hope for the track emerged weeks later, when Penn National Gaming (now Penn Entertainment), fresh off a failure to win approval for its proposed slot parlor in Tewksbury, reached a deal to pursue a gaming license at Plainridge, with an option to buy the track if its bid were successful. Plainville voters soon approved the slots plan by a margin of 3 to 1 in a town referendum, which was required as a condition of licensing.

Penn National was awarded the gaming license in February 2014. The bid overcame competition from two other applicants, a Cordish Company slot parlor proposed for Leominster, and a former greyhound racing track in Raynham.

The slot parlor held a soft opening for invited guests on June 22, 2015, and opened to the public on June 24.

In October 2018, Penn National sold Plainridge's real estate assets to Gaming and Leisure Properties for $250 million, and leased it back for $25 million per year.

== See also ==
- Gambling in Massachusetts
