= Eagleton School =

Location
- 446 Monterey Road; Great Barrington, Massachusetts; United States
- Coordinates: 42.1859°N 73.2972°W

Information
- Type: Private
- Closed: 2016
- NCES School ID: 02033114
- Faculty: 14.0 (on FTE basis)
- Age: 9 to 22
- Enrollment: 70 (2009–10)
- Student to teacher ratio: 5.0:1

Eagleton School was a residential treatment center located in Great Barrington, Massachusetts, for boys ages 9–22 who have a variety of emotional and behavioral problems. It was privately owned by Bruce Bona. It was the host of the Great Barrington Christmas party.

== 1995 tornado ==
Two students and one staff member were killed in the 1995 Great Barrington tornado when their van was picked up by the tornado and thrown 1,000 feet into a wooded ditch. Reports say that the occupants were not strapped in and that no redirection was given for the students to put on their seat belts. Subsequently, the victim's families sued the school, but charges were later dropped. A chapel was built onsite to honor those who died.

== 2016 assault case and closure ==
In January 2016, five employees were charged with assaulting a student. Four additional staff members were also fired for abusive actions. As a result of the incident, the school's license to operate was revoked by the Commonwealth of Massachusetts, and the school shut down in April 2016.
