= 2012 Massachusetts Question 3 =

Referendum legalizing medical marijuana

Massachusetts Question 3 (2012)
- November 6, 2012
- Medical Marijuana Initiative

Results
Choice	Votes	%
Yes	1,895,340	63.32%
No	1,097,797	36.68%

Yes
90–100%
80–90%
70–80%
60–70%
50–60%
No
60–70%
50–60%

The Massachusetts Medical Marijuana Initiative, appeared as the third question on the state's 2012 ballot as an indirect initiated state statute. The measure allows cannabis to be used for medical purposes in the state. The initiative—backed by the American Civil Liberties Union, the Massachusetts Patient Advocacy Alliance, and the Committee for Compassionate Medicine—was filed with proponents turning in the required signatures to the Massachusetts Attorney General's office by the August 3, 2011 deadline. Those signatures were needed for the required ten qualified voters who submitted the original petition to put forward the full text of the law they want enacted. The initiative passed with support from 63% of state voters.

== Ballot language ==
The ballot language of the measure reads as follows:

A YES VOTE would enact the proposed law eliminating state criminal and civil penalties related to the medical use of marijuana, allowing patients meeting certain conditions to obtain marijuana produced and distributed by new state-regulated centers or, in specific hardship cases, to grow marijuana for their own use. A NO VOTE would make no change in existing laws.

== Support ==
The following is information obtained from the supporting side of the ballot measure:

- The American Nurses Association, American Public Health Association, Institute of Medicine, National Cancer Institute, and state medical societies of Rhode Island, California, and New York have attested to the significant therapeutic benefits of marijuana.
- The AIDS Action Committee of Massachusetts, AIDS Support Group of Cape Cod, Massachusetts Nurses Association, Massachusetts Chapter of the Leukemia and Lymphoma Society, Massachusetts Patient Advocacy Alliance, New England Coalition of Cancer Survivorship, Western Mass AIDS Foundation and over 1,200 licensed doctors in Massachusetts support safe access to medical marijuana for patients with a doctor's recommendation.
- According to reports, if the measure is enacted by voters, the National Organization for Positive Medicine hopes to establish a "marijuana compassion center" in Wakefield, Massachusetts. The group filed signatures for a local initiative to do so on April 1, 2012. The initiative states that it wants "a special bylaw requesting that the Massachusetts Department of Public Health issue the National Organization for Positive Medicine (Federal Tax ID No. 019-64-5887) a registration to operate a single not-for-profit medical marijuana compassion center in the Town of Wakefield, MA." Reports say that supporters of the local initiative want it on a Fall 2012 town ballot.
- During a hearing from the Joint Committee on Public Health, Boston resident Eric McCoy stated: "I'm almost 60 years old and the only reason I'm able to function every day is because of marijuana. I would be lying flat on a bed otherwise because of muscle spasms."
- The Waltham News Tribune urges its readers to vote YES on question 3.

== Opposition ==
The following is information obtained from the opposing side of the ballot measure:

- The Massachusetts Medical Society, which represents 24,000 doctors in the state, approved a resolution during the weekend of May 19, 2012 to oppose legalizing medicinal marijuana without scientific proof that it would be safe and effective on patients and stated that it cannot support legislation intended to involve physicians in certifying, authorizing, or otherwise directing persons in the area of medicinal marijuana outside of scientific clinical trials. but it does support to the reclassification of marijuana by the DEA so those trials can be conducted and regulated by the FDA to determine its potential medicinal use by humans.

== Other perspectives ==
- Massachusetts Attorney General Martha Coakley commented on the effects of the measure, but also stated that her office remains neutral on the proposal. Coakley said in an interview, "My position is if this passes as a ballot question it's going to cause a huge headache making sure it's not abused."
- The Patriot Ledger stated in an editorial that the measure should be decided by voters, not the Legislature, saying, "This is an issue that we believe should be decided by the citizens of the commonwealth, not in the behind-the-scenes muscling that goes on in the offices and corridors at the Statehouse."

== Legal challenge ==
In May 2012, The Massachusetts Prevention Alliance filed a petition to the state supreme judicial court requesting that the wording of the ballot question be changed. According to reports, the group claimed that the wording of the measure hid key provisions of the potential state statute. For example, the group argued that a network of dispensaries would be created to comply with the law, if enacted, but that this was not shown clearly by the wording.

Shortly after, Massachusetts Attorney General Martha Coakley moved to dismiss the petition. According to the Attorney General's office, the petition did not offer a valid alternative way to write the ballot question.

During the case hearings, associate justice of the state Supreme Judicial Court Robert J. Cordy was skeptical of the ballot measure's wording, indicating he was open to a re-writing of the proposal's language, asking the Attorney General, "If it was entitled, 'Medical use of cigarettes,' would you have a problem with that? What's your evidence there is a medical use of marijuana?"

Around June 8, 2012, the supreme judicial court ruled in favor of the opponents who filed the lawsuit, stating that the measure's language was misleading. The court ruled that Coakley rewrite the ballot language.

In a decision on July 2, 2012 Massachusetts Supreme Judicial Court Associate Justice Robert J. Cordy approved newly rewritten language of the measure.

According to reports, the main part of the language that was rewritten was the "yes" statement reads that reads, "A yes vote would enact the proposed law eliminating state criminal and civil penalties related to the medical use of marijuana, allowing patients meeting certain conditions to obtain marijuana produced and distributed by new state-regulated centers, or, in specific hardship cases, to grow marijuana for their own use."

== Polls ==
- A poll was released and conducted by Public Policy Polling regarding the measure in late August 2012. According to reports, the poll revealed that 58% of those surveyed are in favor of medical marijuana. The actual question that was asked read: "Question 3 would eliminate state criminal and civil penalties for the medical use of marijuana by qualifying patients. If the election was today, would you vote yes or no on Question 3?"
- A Poll By the Boston Globe / University of New Hampshire taken in late September 2012 showed 69% to 22% in favor of passing the ballot initiative.

== See also ==
- Massachusetts 2012 Ballot Measures
- Direct Democracy in Massachusetts
