= Back Bay Restaurant Group =

American restaurant company

Back Bay Restaurant Group was an American restaurant company headquartered in Boston, Massachusetts, which operated a number of upscale restaurant chains along the East Coast, primarily in New England.

== History ==
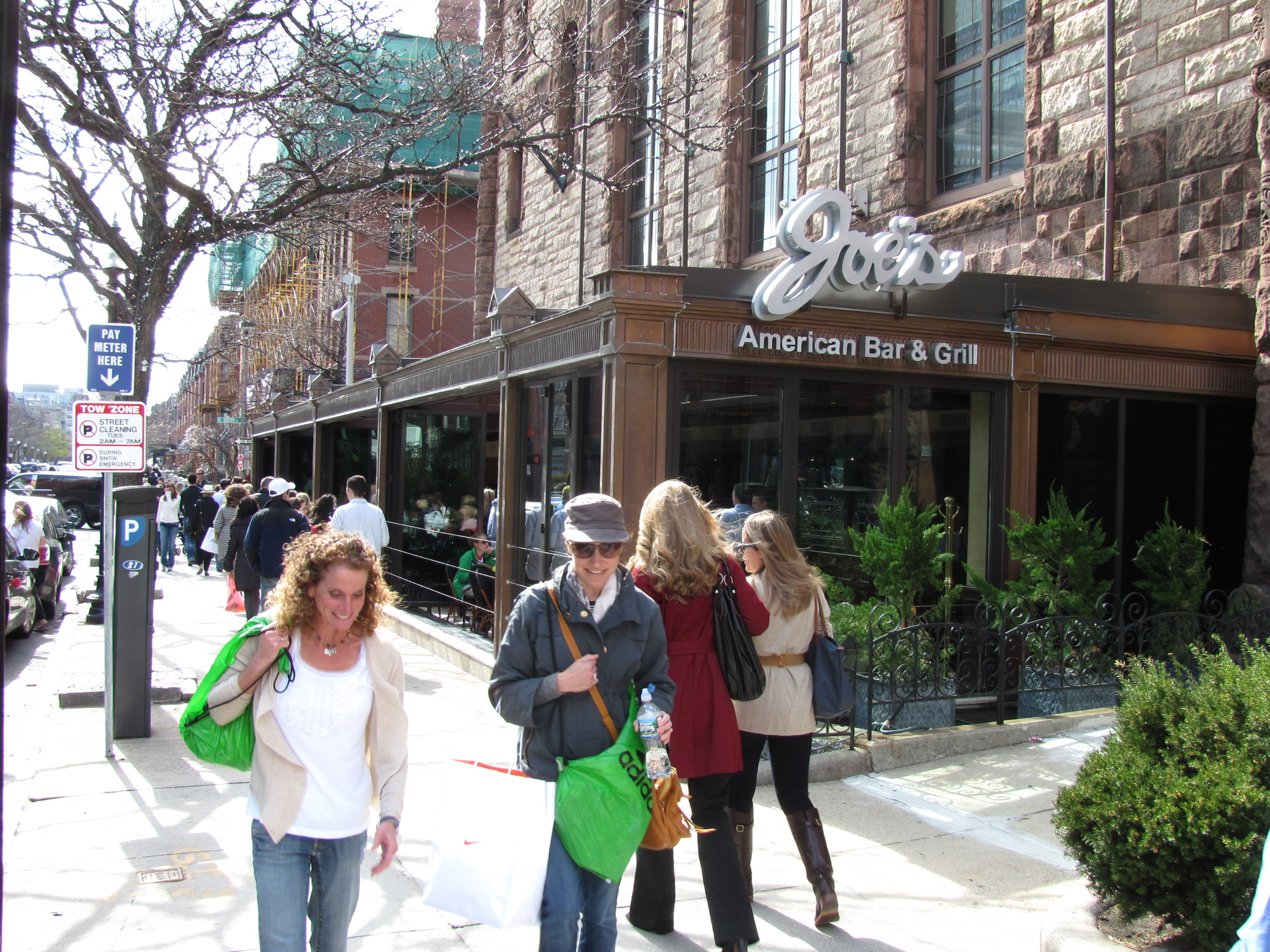
Joe's American Bar and Grill on Newbury Street in Boston

The Back Bay Restaurant Group was founded in 1992 when it was spun off from Charles Sarkis' Westwood Group and went public at $17 a share. It was listed on the NASDAQ under the symbol "PAPA". At the time Back Bay Restaurant Group went public it had 14 restaurants. By 1999 the company stock had dropped to $3.50 a share and a 25% shareholder wanted out. Sarkis took the company private again for $38 million. By 2002, Back Bay Restaurant Group consisted of 35 restaurants on the East Coast, including the Abe & Louie's, J.C. Hillary's, Atlantic Fish Co., Coach Grill, Joe's American Bar & Grill, and Papa Razzi chains.

In 2010, Sarkis' health seriously declined. He was also under significant financial strain following the closure of his other business, Wonderland Greyhound Park.

In 2011, Back Bay Restaurant Group sold 33 of its restaurants, which included 15 Joe's American Bar & Grill locations, 12 Papa Razzi restaurants and its flagship enterprise, Abe & Louie's, to the Tavistock Restaurants, LLC. In March 2012 he sold seven Papa Razzi locations to the Newport Harbor Group. In December 2013, it closed its final two Massachusetts restaurants, Papa Razzi and Joe's American Bar and Grill in Hanover. Its final two restaurants, both located in New Jersey, were closed at the end of March 2018.

Sarkis died on March 11, 2018, at the age of 78. As of March 2018, six Joe's American Bar and Grill restaurants were in business, though now owned by Tavistock; five in Massachusetts and one in Fairfield, Connecticut. In early 2020, however, two Joe's American Bar and Grill restaurants were closed; one in Massachusetts and the Fairfield location.
