= Great Barrington Fair =

The Great Barrington Fair was a 57-acre site on the floodplain of the Housatonic River in Great Barrington, Massachusetts that once hosted the longest continually operating fair in New England. The fair was incorporated in 1848, with area farmers exhibited livestock, fruits, vegetables and other items of interest. Horse racing was added on September 30, 1859. Attendance grew rapidly after Thoroughbred racing with parimutuel betting was added in September 1940. Like many rural tracks, interest declined over the years and the facility eventually closed in 1983. A tornado wrecked the large grandstand at the racetrack in 1995. It was rebuilt and improved and parimutuel betting on the horses resumed in 1997 but lasted only two years before the track closed permanently after the 1998 racing season.

A New York City firm bought the site for $2.7 million in 2006 with the intention of building mixed-use facilities there, including a 100-room hotel. Those plans never materialized and the financiers foreclosed on the property in 2010.

In 2012, the property was sold to Fairgrounds Realty LLC for $800,000 with plans for a recreation and sustainable agriculture project.
