= Berkshire Downs (racetrack) =

Coordinates: 42.421°N 73.346°W

Berkshire Downs was an American horse racing track located in Hancock, Berkshire County, Massachusetts. The track opened for its first season of racing on 19 September 1960 and in 1962 counted Frank Sinatra and Dean Martin as investors. The track struggled from outset due to poor weather, corruption, and proximity to other nearby tracks including Green Mountain Race Track, a much larger track that opened in 1963 only 30 miles due north.

The track ownership included many infamous names in mafia circles such as Angelo Bruno and Raymond L.S. Patriarca. In the early 1970s, the track made national headlines when the owners were compelled to appear before a Senate Sub Committee investigating racketeering, but Sinatra and Martin were cleared of wrongdoing. The facility closed in 1976 and is now used as a private horse breeding and training business, Sebring Stables on Richmond Road.
