= 2012 Massachusetts elections =

2012 Massachusetts general election
- November 6, 2012

Part of the 2012 United States elections

The Massachusetts general election, 2012 was held on November 6, 2012, throughout Massachusetts. Primary elections took place on September 6, 2012.

== Ballot measures ==

There were three statewide ballot questions, all initiatives.

Number	Initiative Title	Subject	Description	Status	Yes	No
Question 1	Massachusetts Right to Repair Initiative	Business Regulation	Vehicle owner and business protections	Passed	74%	12%
Question 2	Massachusetts Death with Dignity Initiative	Assisted Death	Establishes as right to death with dignity	Defeated	46%	48%
Question 3	Massachusetts Medical Marijuana Initiative	Medical Marijuana	Would allow for the use of medical marijuana in the state	Passed	60%	35%
