= 2008 Massachusetts elections =

2008 Massachusetts general election
- November 4, 2008

Part of the 2008 United States elections

The 200 Massachusetts general elections were held on November 4, 2008 throughout Massachusetts. Among the elections which took place were those for the office of President of the United States, John Kerry's seat in the Senate, all ten seats in the Massachusetts delegation to the House of Representatives, all eight seats in the Massachusetts Governor's Council, and all of the seats of the Massachusetts Senate and Massachusetts House of Representatives. There were also three ballot questions: to eliminate the commonwealth's income tax; to decriminalize possession of a small amount of marijuana; and to prohibit greyhound racing. Numerous local elections also took place throughout the state.

== United States Senate ==
U.S. Senator John Kerry (D) defeated Democratic challenger Edward O'Reilly in the primary on September 16, 2008. He defeated Republican Jeff Beatty and Libertarian Robert Underwood in the general election. The seat was considered safe for John Kerry.

== United States House of Representatives ==
All 10 members of the delegation to the United States House of Representatives in Massachusetts were up for re-election in 2008. All 10 seats were under Democratic control. Republican candidates contested four of the races. In District 1, Republican Nathan Bech opposed Democratic incumbent John Olver. (John Olver defeated a Democratic challenger, Robert Feuer, in the primary on September 16, 2008.) In District 4, Republican Earl Sholley and Unenrolled candidate Susan Allen opposed Democratic incumbent Barney Frank. In District 6, Republican Richard Baker opposed Democratic incumbent John Tierney. In District 7, Republican John Cunningham opposed Democratic incumbent Ed Markey. Despite these challenges, all ten seats were considered safe for their incumbents.

== Governor's Council ==
All 8 current members of the Massachusetts Governor's Council were up for re-election in 2008. The Governor's Council's most important role is to approve the governor's judicial nominees, serving as an important check on the power of the Governor. Because Governor's Council districts are so large, and because the office of Governor's Councillor has very little awareness in the state, it is notoriously difficult to unseat an incumbent.

In 2008, six of the eight incumbent Governor's Councillors defeated a Democratic challenger in the primary on September 16, 2008. One of the eight incumbents, Thomas Merrigan, faced a Republican challenger, Michael Franco, in the general election. One of the seats was uncontested.

== Massachusetts Senate ==
All 40 seats in the Massachusetts Senate were up for election in 2008. The Massachusetts Democratic Party maintained a supermajority of 35 seats, with the remaining 5 seats under the control of the Massachusetts Republican Party.

== Massachusetts House of Representatives ==
All 160 seats in the Massachusetts House of Representatives were up for election in 2008. The Massachusetts Democratic Party maintained a supermajority of 144, with the remaining 16 seats under the control of the Massachusetts Republican Party.

== Local races ==
=== Register of probate ===
Each of Massachusetts' fourteen counties elected a Register of Probate, who will administer the county's family and probate court. Races in Barnstable County, Bristol County, Hampden County, and Nantucket County are expected to feature more than one candidate in the general election.

=== County treasurer ===
Bristol County, Duke's County, Norfolk County and Plymouth County each elected a County Treasurer in the 2008 Massachusetts general election. Only the race in Plymouth County featured more than one candidate for the position.

=== County Commissioner ===
Barnstable County, Bristol County, Duke's County, Norfolk County and Plymouth County will each elect one or two County Commissioners in the 2008 Massachusetts general election. Every race will feature more than one candidate for the position.

== Ballot questions ==
Number	Initiative Title	Subject	Description	Status
Question 1	Massachusetts State Income Tax Repeal	Taxes	Would repeal state income tax	Defeated
Question 2	Massachusetts Sensible Marijuana Policy Initiative	Marijuana policy	Decriminalizes small amounts of marijuana	Passed
Question 3	Massachusetts Greyhound Protection Act	Animal rights	Aims to prohibit (professional) dog racing	Passed
