= Wonderland Greyhound Park =

Former greyhound racing track in Revere, Massachusetts

Coordinates: 42°24′44.68″N 70°59′49.15″W

The logo of Wonderland Greyhound Park.

Wonderland Greyhound Park was a greyhound racing track located in Revere, Massachusetts, formerly owned by the Westwood Group. It was constructed on the site of the former Wonderland Amusement Park. Wonderland opened on June 12, 1935, and formerly offered 361 races during its 100-day, April to September racing period.

As a result of a statewide ban on dog racing which took effect on January 1, 2010, the track offered simulcast wagering, and later closed completely on August 19, 2010. The track laid off the remaining 75 to 80 workers and closed after Massachusetts governor Deval Patrick vetoed a gaming bill that could have allowed the park to add slot machines.

== History ==
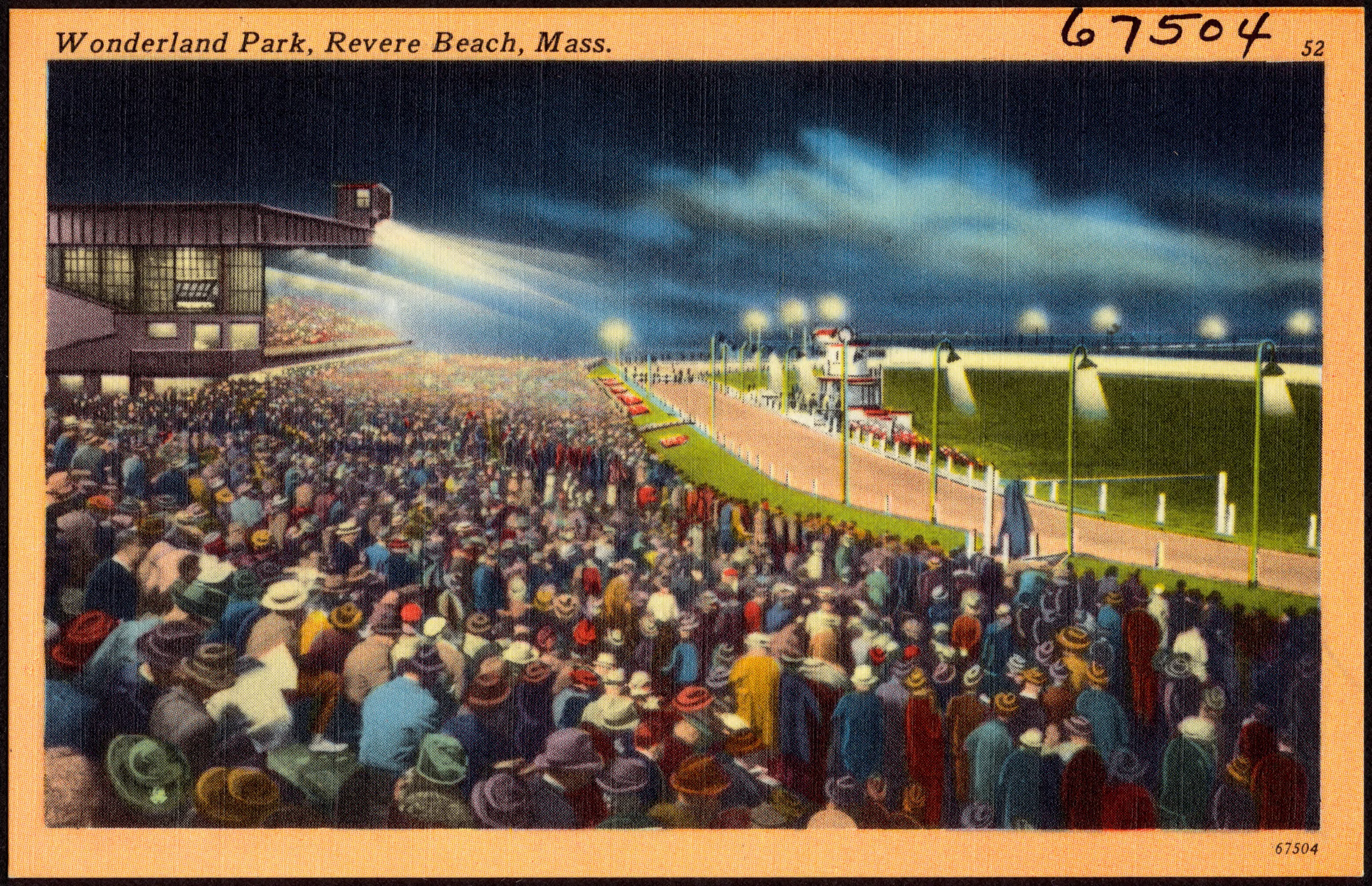
Postcard c. 1930s

=== Opening ===
With the legalization of Parimutuel betting by the Massachusetts Legislature in 1934, the idea of Wonderland Greyhound Park was made a possibility. The track was constructed on the site of the former Wonderland Amusement Park in Revere, which had been converted from an amusement park to a bicycle track after the park closed in 1911.

The opening night of Wonderland Greyhound Park took place on June 12, 1935, and was attended by an estimated 5,000 people. Pansy Walker won the first-ever greyhound race in the park while $58,462 was wagered for the first evening. By July 21, after 17 race nights, the money wagered topped $100,000, never dropping below the figure for the duration of the park's 100 night inaugural season.

The original entities granted the license for greyhound racing were the Harbor Kennel Club and the Bay State Greyhound Association. In 1940, the two groups merged to form the Revere Racing Association, which was led by former Boston City Council president Edward M. Gallagher. He was succeeded as track president by his son, Edward M. Gallagher Jr.

=== 20th century races ===
Racing was conducted over three distances: by far the most popular distance was 5/16ths of a mile. The Revere Course was slightly more than 3/8ths of a mile and the Wonderland Course was 7/16ths of a mile. The Huestis Course (seldom run) was 9/16ths of a mile. For almost the entire racing life of the track the evening program was 10 races; Massachusetts law required the last race to be off by 11PM. As an attempt to stay in business, the number of daily races was increased, though the daily purse structure was not increased a great deal. The greyhound racing lure was affectionately known as "Swifty", spawning the repetition of the track announcer's call "There goes Swifty!" not only at the track but as an area reference in casual conversation.

The track traditionally raced in the evenings only, at first beginning about Memorial Day, and closing the week prior to the opening of the "Topsfield Fair", a large 10 day agricultural fair operated by the Essex County Agricultural Society, which featured greyhound racing at its track in Topsfield, Massachusetts. At the conclusion of the Wonderland meet, many owners would race at Topsfield, prior to transferring their kennels to several tracks in Florida. The original meet was permitted to be 80 days, expanded to 100 days in the early 1960s. After the purchase by Joseph Linsey, the track petitioned for additional dates, and was essentially permitted to run year-round, with several days per week offering matinee performances as well as evening racing. At the time, nearby Suffolk Downs, a thoroughbred (and later also a harness racing venue) track closed shortly after the beginning of the Wonderland meet, daytime thoroughbred racing in the area transferred about 30 miles away to Rockingham Park, in Salem, New Hampshire, Suffolk Downs generally resuming thoroughbred racing in early September. Suffolk Downs and Wonderland did not overlap racing times; Suffolk Downs' card would end at about 5PM, and Wonderland's first race would generally be 8PM, later changed to 7 and 7:30PM. The track had a large parking lot adjacent to the track (now used to store rental cars from nearby Logan Airport) and a second large parking lot across the VFW Parkway (now a strip shopping center anchored by A Staples and a 99 Restaurant). The termination of a rapid transit line (the "Blue Line") was directly across the VFW Parkway from the track. That station, named then as now "Wonderland Station" remains very active to this day.

The greyhound "grading" system, instituted in 1946, provided a method for more accurate handicapping, resulting in increased handle. Greyhound would start in Grade "M" (maiden, no wins) though some tracks would employ a Grade "E", Wonderland did not, dogs winning a maiden race being placed in Grade D. If successful, dogs could progress possibly improving to Grade AA, or move up and down the grading system at various levels until retiring or being dropped as uncompetitive. "Schooling" [non-betting] races were held prior to the evening performances, and schooling race information would be included in the racing program once a greyhound's racing career began. Generally the racing program would carry information regarding either the last 8 or 10 races; other publications (such as the "Tel-Mor Book" would carry lifetime performance information and be available at additional cost). Greyhounds which did not finish fourth or better in any three consecutive races were dropped a grade, to improve the competitive nature of the racing. For the evening programs, a single Grade AA race was run. This race, known as "The Hot Box" was for the finest greyhounds racing at the meet. Generally all greyhounds racing at the meet would race exclusively at Wonderland, after running at various tracks in Florida during the winter months. For many years greyhounds were imported into the United States and raced at Wonderland after racing in Ireland (and sometime England). Several breeders specialized in raising dogs in Ireland and training them at Irish tracks prior to importing them to the US.

Wonderland quickly became the premier greyhound racing venue in the Northern United States. Greyhound racing was conducted at two additional tracks in Southeastern Massachusetts at Taunton and Raynham, but the crowds and nightly handle at Wonderland substantially exceeded the handle at the other Massachusetts tracks. Wonderland was known throughout the industry for hosting the premier greyhound championship greyhound race each August, "The Wonderland Derby". This race, which ended in 1988, often drew in excess of 30,000 fans. Seabrook Greyhound Park (now closed) opened in 1970 and as it was about 40 miles from Wonderland, offered competition, including its own race "The Great Greyhound Race", which featured championship dogs from Wonderland and Seabrook running stakes races. Most Boston area television stations carried video of the winners of the first two (Daily Double) races each evening and the video results of any stakes race.

Wonderland offered a grandstand area and a two-story clubhouse. The upper floor of the clubhouse offered a sit down dining room, which on weekend evenings generally required advance reservations and was known for the quality of its food. The track had a full liquor license and for many years the concessions were operated by Harry M. Stevens, Inc. In later years the track would be rented for pay per view boxing exhibitions on closed circuit television, and a sports bar type operation was offered with minimal success.

=== 1970s ===
In 1977, Joseph Linsey acquired majority ownership in Wonderland. He quickly sold the track to The Westwood Group, operator of several large successful Boston area restaurants headed by restaurateur Charles Sarkis, and insurer James Kelley. New management along with the 1978 omnibus racing bill were economically beneficial as Wonderland's offerings began to expand. Under the leadership of the Westwood Group, the park made a total of four handles of over 1 million dollars; they occurred on August 29, 1981 ($1,004,826), May 5, 1983 ($1,004,740), August 11, 1984 ($1,086,554) and April 30, 1988 ($1,025,928).

Wonderland for many years operated successfully running at the same time as Raynham and Taunton, as the geographical distance was such that traffic made travel from Southeastern Massachusetts to the north suburban of Boston generally unfeasible. In 1973 Seabrook Greyhound Park opened, and began competition with Wonderland. Seabrook offered the "Trifecta" a gimmick bet where a better chose the first three finishers in exact order, and a very popular "quinela" first two finishers in either order, with odds prominently displayed on a specialized tote board. Wonderland rapidly copied those betting formats in 1975 with great success.

=== Peak and decline ===
The best year for the track according to Sarkis was in 1991, but he claims that business started to taper off as full service casinos were built in Connecticut and Rhode Island, along with the lottery which started "nibbling at gamblers' available dollars".

Wonderland experienced legal issues when the City of Revere attempted to collect overdue taxes and utility bills. The track owed over two years' worth of back taxes and utility bills to the city, which threatened Wonderland with foreclosure if it failed to pay. A lien had been placed on the property in June 2007, and revocation hearings for its annual liquor and parking licenses were planned. The bill, totaling $752,301, was finally paid in a lump sum in October 2008. A similar situation also occurred in 1994, when Wonderland's owners owed over $1.5 million in back taxes. Races on cold days were made possible through the use of over 7 miles (11 km) of underground piping that heated the racetrack. In addition, the park featured year round simulcast which allowed patrons to bet on races at other tracks.

=== Banning of dog races ===
Voters of the commonwealth passed the Massachusetts Greyhound Protection Act through a referendum held on November 4, 2008, which banned greyhound racing statewide as of January 1, 2010. As a result, live races ended at the park on September 18, 2009.

=== Failed casino attempt ===
Governor Deval Patrick's idea of introducing gambling to the state failed to make it through the legislature in 2007. Cited as the key to keep Wonderland open, casino gambling was proposed for the site. On August 13, 2008, a nearly two-year discussion ended with Richard Fields, the principal owner of the Suffolk Downs horse track in East Boston, Massachusetts. A partnership with Wonderland was formed which strengthened their position to build a casino at Suffolk Downs. Suffolk Downs would then share the license with Wonderland. The deal allows Suffolk Downs to buy Wonderland, which it would then redevelop for commercial or mixed uses.

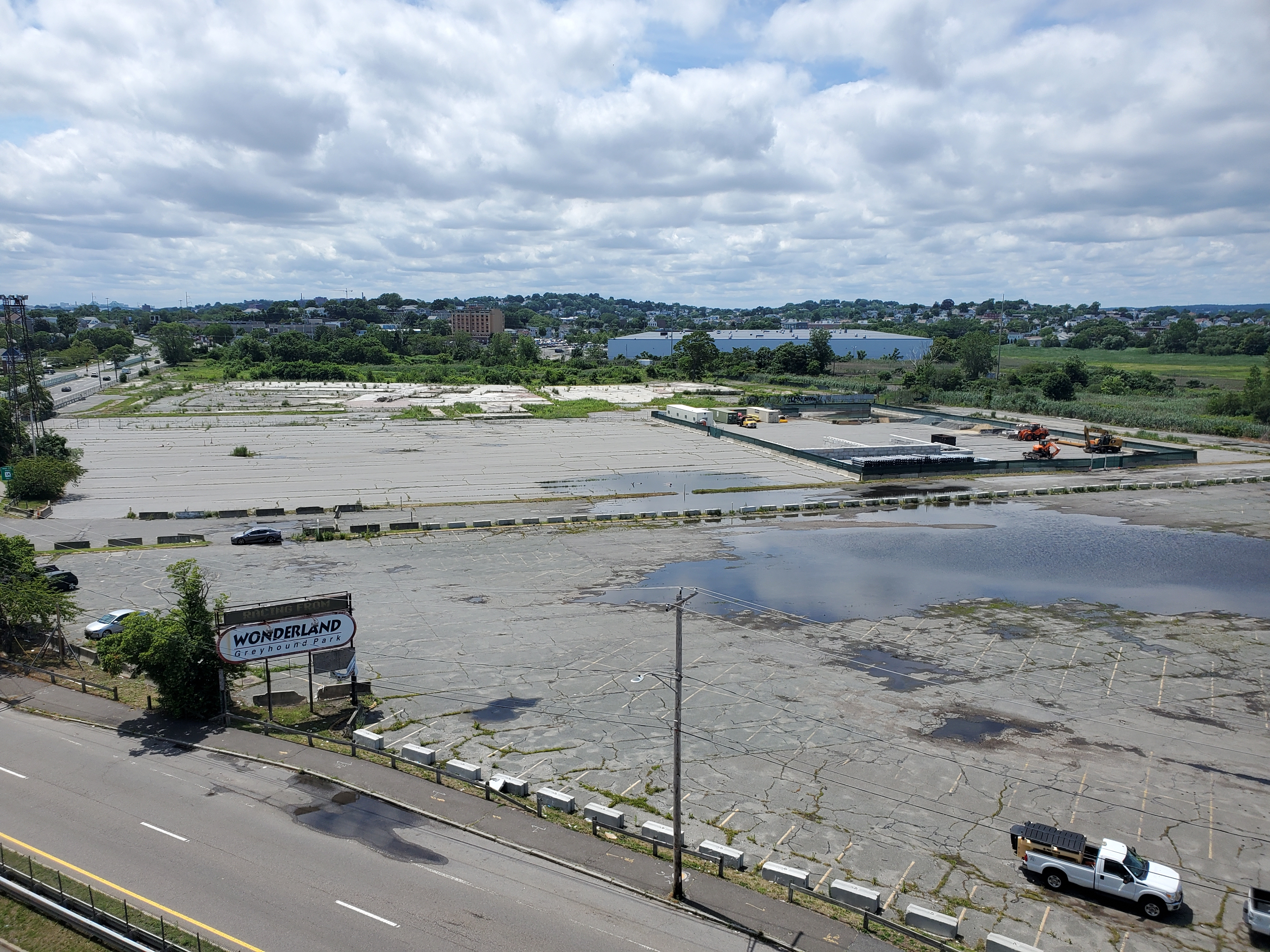
The demolished park in 2021

Massachusetts House Speaker Salvatore Dimasi, however, an opponent of casinos, said through an aide that he has not changed his opinion and would presumably urge the Massachusetts legislature to not allow casino gambling in the state. In late 2008, the Patrick administration announced that it was not focused on slots at the tracks or casinos, but that Patrick was "concerned about any job losses from any companies" and pledged to begin planning ways to assist or retrain track workers. By mid-2010, the administration announced that it would allow three full casino resort licenses to non-racetrack locations and in a last minute compromise, added a provision for one slot parlor that a racetrack could acquire through competitive bidding. When the House and Senate proposed a bill with two slot parlors, Patrick vetoed it as he previously stated that he would only accept one parlor. As a result of the casino bill not passing, the owners found the continued operation of the park offering only simulcast racing to be uneconomical. Wonderland Greyhound Park closed on August 19, 2010, laying off the remaining 75 to 80 workers. The 2011 Expanded Gaming Act legalized casinos in the state, but the Boston-area license went to Wynn/Encore Boston Harbor and the slot parlor license to Plainridge Park Casino. (See Gambling in Massachusetts.)

=== ECW Mass Transit Incident ===
On November 23, 1996, the venue hosted an Extreme Championship Wrestling (ECW) house show which featured a 17-year-old aspiring professional wrestler named Erich Kulas who wrestled under the ring name "Mass Transit" who was involved in a tag team match with Devon "D-Von Dudley" Hughes against The Gangstas tag team which consisted of Jerome "New Jack" Young and Jamal Mustafa. In this match, Kulas suffered severe injuries due to being bladed by New Jack which severed two of the arteries in his forehead. Further information revealed that Kulas had lied about his age to ECW owner and booker Paul Heyman in which he claimed he was 21 years old, but in reality was 17. Kulas' family filed a lawsuit against New Jack after he was tried on charges of assault and battery with a dangerous weapon. After Kulas admitted that he asked to be cut, the jury acquitted New Jack and concluded that he was not liable in a civil court.

=== Demolition and redevelopment ===
Demolition of the track began in 2017, with the investment company that owns it looking for a buyer for redevelopment. The City of Revere seized the property by eminent domain in November 2022 with the intention of building a new Revere High School on the site; this led to a lawsuit by CBW Lending in early 2023, claiming that the $29.5 million the city paid for the land undervalued the property, which it estimated to be worth $100 million. Amidst the litigation, groundbreaking for the new school took place in August 2025.
