= Massachusetts Greyhound Protection Act =

Referendum banning commercial dog racing

Question 3
- Massachusetts Greyhound Protection Act

Results
Choice	Votes	%
Yes	1,662,352	56.05%
No	1,303,708	43.95%
Valid votes	2,966,060	100.00%
Invalid or blank votes	0	0.00%
Total votes	2,966,060	100.00%

Yes
80–90%
70–80%
60–70%
50–60%
No
80–90%
70–80%
60–70%
50–60%
Other
Tie
No votes

The Greyhound Protection Act is a Massachusetts statute that gradually eliminated commercial dog racing by 2010. It was enacted as Question 3 on the November 4, 2008 ballot in Massachusetts.

It shut down the state's two tracks, Raynham-Taunton Greyhound Park and Wonderland Greyhound Park in Revere, by January 1, 2010. Violators face minimum fines of $20,000 by the State Racing Commission. Raynham voted for No by an 80-90 margin, the only municipality to do so.

== Specific provisions in the initiative ==
Details of the statute are:

- Prohibition: Any dog racing or racing meeting in Massachusetts where any form of betting or wagering on the speed or ability of dogs occurs.
- Regulation: The State Racing Commission is prohibited from accepting or approving any application or request for racing dates for dog racing.
- Penalty: Any person violating the law will be required to pay a civil penalty of not less than $20,000 to the Commission, to be used for the Commission's administrative purposes, subject to appropriation by the state Legislature.
- Interpretation: All existing parts of the chapter of the state's General Laws concerning dog and horse racing meetings will be interpreted as if they do not refer to dogs.
- Effective date: These changes took effect January 1, 2010.
- Severability: If any of its parts were declared invalid, the other parts would stay in effect.

== Legislative history ==
=== Past initiative ===
A similar initiative made the ballot in 2000, the racing industry opposed it with television ads arguing that the 2000 initiative would lead to the loss of 1,500 jobs along with $10 million in pari-mutuel betting and other taxes.

=== Petition drive ===
Supporters submitted 45,000 signatures to qualify the measure for the November 2008 ballot on June 17. The state legislature had until the first Wednesday in May to make the proposals law. Without the legislature's support, proponents had until June 18 to gather another 11,099 signatures. The proponents claimed to have gathered 100,000 signatures, guaranteeing that the initiative would meet the requirements.

=== Lawsuit to strike from the ballot ===
Opponents filed a lawsuit in March saying the measure is unfit for the ballot because it singles out the two tracks, when it should apply to the whole state. The Supreme Judicial Court took the matter under advisement after a hearing on May 7.

On July 15, the court rejected the challenge by the initiative's opponents, which means that unless other lawsuits are filed and are successful, the initiative will appear on the November ballot.

The high court rejected the claim that the initiative shouldn't be on a statewide ballot because it was about two local racetracks by saying that racing amounts to a statewide concern.

== Results ==
Greyhound Protection Act
Choice	Votes	%
For	1,662,352	56.05
Against	1,303,708	43.95
Total	2,966,060	100.00
Valid votes	2,966,060	95.59
Invalid/blank votes	136,935	4.41
Total votes	3,102,995	100.00
Registered voters/turnout	4,220,488	73.52

== Supporters ==
The Committee to Protect Dogs was the official ballot committee of the initiative.

In addition to the Committee to Protect Dogs, the Greyhound Protection Act was endorsed by:

- GREY2K USA
- The Springfield Republican
- The Blue Mass Group
- Other animal protection organizations include the American Society for the Prevention of Cruelty to Animals, the Humane Society of the United States, and the Animal Rescue League of Boston.

=== Arguments for initiative ===
Arguments in favor of the initiative that were made by its supporters include:

- In late 2003 and early 2004, a greyhound at Wonderland Greyhound Park tested positive for cocaine.
- The claim that thousands of dogs suffer inhumane conditions at Wonderland Greyhound Park and Raynham Park, Massachusetts' two racetracks, by being kept confined for 20 hours every day in small cages barely large enough for the animals to stand up or turn around in.
- The claim that over 800 dogs have suffered serious injuries while competing at Massachusetts racetracks, including broken bones, head injuries, and paralysis.
- The dog racing industry has experienced a "catastrophic economic decline" in the past two decades, which has led to some racetracks seeking assistance from politicians, including direct subsidies, tax breaks, special trust funds, and expanded gambling rights.
- It requires over 1000 dogs to operate a Massachusetts race track.

=== Funding ===
According to campaign finance reports, as of November 1, 2008 the Committee to Protect Dogs has raised approximately $903,000 and has $9,169.09 remaining. Grey2k shows no filings for 2008. Between 2005 - 2007 they filed as having received no donations or expenditures and $18,490.21 in liabilities although they appear to have donated approx $55,000 and well over $100,000 in staff and services to the committee since 2005.

== Opponents ==
The official ballot committee opposed to the initiative was The Massachusetts Animal Interest Coalition which was mainly made up of the owners of the two tracks that would be shut down, including George Carney, who owned the Raynham-Taunton track for the previous 40 years, and Charles Sarkis, owner of the Wonderland track.

=== Arguments against initiative ===
Arguments that were made against the initiative include:

- That supporters of the initiative used photographs of hurt and emaciated greyhounds from other states to make its case and that Massachusetts dogs were healthy and well treated.
- there would be a loss of jobs that support the Massachusetts economy.

=== Newspaper editorial boards are against ===
- The Boston Globe

=== Funding ===
According to campaign finance reports, as of November 1, 2008 The Massachusetts Animal Interest Coalition had raised approximately $436,000 and has $7,720.38 remaining. It also received approx $215,000 in in-kind donations such as staff, postage, etc.. mainly from the 2 race tracks. They also had an additional $3,000 in liabilities.

== See also ==
- Massachusetts 2008 ballot measures

== Sources ==
The original version of this article was taken from Ballotpedia's article about the Massachusetts Greyhound Protection Act
