= National Council on Problem Gambling (United States) =

Addiction and mental health charity

- Formation: 1972; 54 years ago
- Website: www.ncpgambling.org

The National Council on Problem Gambling is an American nonprofit organization. Founded in 1972 by Joseph A. Dunne and Robert Custer among others, it is the oldest organization on gambling issues in the United States. The Council established that the organization would be the advocate for those impacted by problem gambling and it would maintain a neutral stance regarding the activity of gambling.

The National Council's mission is to lead state and national stakeholders in the development of comprehensive policy and programs for all those affected by problem gambling with the purpose of serving as the national advocate for programs and services to assist problem gamblers and their families. It is neither for nor against legalized gambling.

The NCPG concentrates efforts on the national level, while the state affiliates work at the state and local level. NCPG's network of state affiliate, individual and corporate members includes leaders in prevention, education, treatment, enforcement, research, responsible gambling and recovery communities.

Keith Whyte served as executive director from October 1998 until January 2025. In November 2025, Heather L. Maurer was appointed as the executive director.

== NCPG programs ==
A large portion of the NCPG funding comes from its membership program. NCPG membership is organized with 3 classes of members: state affiliate, corporate, and individual.

The NCPG's major programs include the following:

- National Problem Gambling Helpline (1-800-MY-RESET): ensures local problem gambling help anywhere in the U.S., is free, and available 24/7.
- National Referral Resource: NCPG maintains the only nationwide online directories of certified counselors and inpatient/residential treatment facilities that offer specialized help in problem gambling, plus state-by-state referral resource listings.
- Problem Gambling Awareness Month: An annual grassroots campaign in March that aims to raise awareness about problem gambling and to educate the public and healthcare professionals about the availability of help and hope. NCPG encourages stakeholders to “Have the Conversation” about problem gambling and explore the many meanings of this theme by providing free press releases, screening tools, logo files, wearable messaging and other resources.
- National Conference on Problem Gambling and Responsible Gambling: The oldest and largest annual conference of its kind. Approximately 500 regulators, legislators, counselors, researchers, industry executives and recovering gamblers attend each year. The location changes each year, hosted by a state affiliate.
- Gift Responsibly Campaign: Created in partnership with the International Centre for Youth Gambling Problems and High-Risk Behaviors at McGill University, this campaign encourages adults to be aware of the risks of giving lottery products to minors as holiday gifts because those who start gambling at a young age are more likely to develop a problem later in life. NCPG partners with lottery organizations, providing free resources such as press release samples, social media guidelines and advertising materials, to launch their own independent campaigns. The campaign is supported by the North American Association of State and Provincial Lotteries (NASPL). It also receives endorsements from the World Lottery Association (WLA) and European Lotteries (EL).
- NASPL/NCPG Responsible Gambling Verification Program (RGV): In partnership with the North American Association of State and Provincial Lotteries, RGV is an independent review of lottery efforts to plan, implement and sustain their programs in RG in accordance with NCPG standards. Free to NASPL members.
- Internet Compliance Assessment Program (iCAP): Independent reviewers assess an internet gambling site's compliance with NCPG's Internet Responsible Gaming Standards, the first such standards developed for the U.S. market.
- Responsible Gaming Principles for Sports Gambling Legislation: Provides a basis for new regulations and legislation that may be enacted by individual states to allow sports betting. The principles will help protect individuals, gaming companies, and legislators by assisting the creation of reasonable efforts to prevent harm and provide treatment.

== Partnerships ==
In May 2026, the NCPG partnered with Kalshi, a prediction betting site. Kalshi plans to provide $2 million over two years and work together for trader health and safety.
