= Ryan Blethen =

American newspaper executive (born 1972)

Ryan Blethen is an American newspaper publisher. He is a member of the Blethen family, who have owned a majority stake in The Seattle Times since 1896. Blethen has served as publisher of the newspaper since January 2026 after taking over the position from his father, Frank A. Blethen.

Blethen was born in 1972, the son of Frank A. Blethen, who was to serve as publisher of The Seattle Times from 1985 to 2025. From 1991 to 1996, Ryan Blethen attended Washington State University and studied history. He was enrolled in a journalism school program at the University of Kansas from 1999 to 2000 but did not receive a degree. In 2000, Blethen worked as an intern-reporter at the Blethen family–owned Yakima Herald-Republic; from 2000 to 2001 he branched out of the family organization and reported for The Spokesman-Review—his first full-time job. From 2001 to 2002, Blethen was a reporter for the Portland Press Herald before working there as a regional editor from 2002 to 2005. Because The Seattle Times Company owned the Press Herald at the time, Blethen's 2002 promotion was criticized by some journalist peers as nepotism.

According to a Seattle Times article, Blethen began working for The Seattle Times Company in 1997. At The Seattle Times, he worked as an associate editorial page editor before being named the editorial page editor in 2009. The Stranger reported that this promotion probably made him the youngest person to hold that role "at any major print daily in the country". He held that role until 2011 and continued at the Times in various positions.

On January 1, 2026, Blethen became the publisher of The Seattle Times. Blethen was an assistant managing editor at the time. His father had served as publisher and CEO, and was succeeded in 2026 by Ryan Blethen as publisher and Alan Fisco as CEO.

Ryan Blethen's great-great grandfather is Alden J. Blethen, who purchased what is now The Seattle Times in 1896. He traces his paternal lineage through Clarance B. Blethen and Frank A. Blethen Sr. to his father, Frank A. Blethen Jr. Ryan Blethen is thus a member of the fifth generation of Blethens to lead the newspaper.
