= Wrongful conviction of Steve Titus =

Overturned criminal conviction in the United States

The wrongful conviction of Steve Titus was a miscarriage of justice in which Steve Gary Titus (1949–1985), an American businessman, was convicted wrongly of rape. Titus was dismissed from his job after the conviction and, though the charges were soon dismissed, he became long term unemployed. The crime was later determined to have been committed by serial rapist Edward Lee King. Journalist Paul Henderson was awarded the Pulitzer Prize for Investigative Reporting for his work on the case. Jack Olsen's book Predator examined the investigation of the crime and the life of the real criminal.

== Crime ==
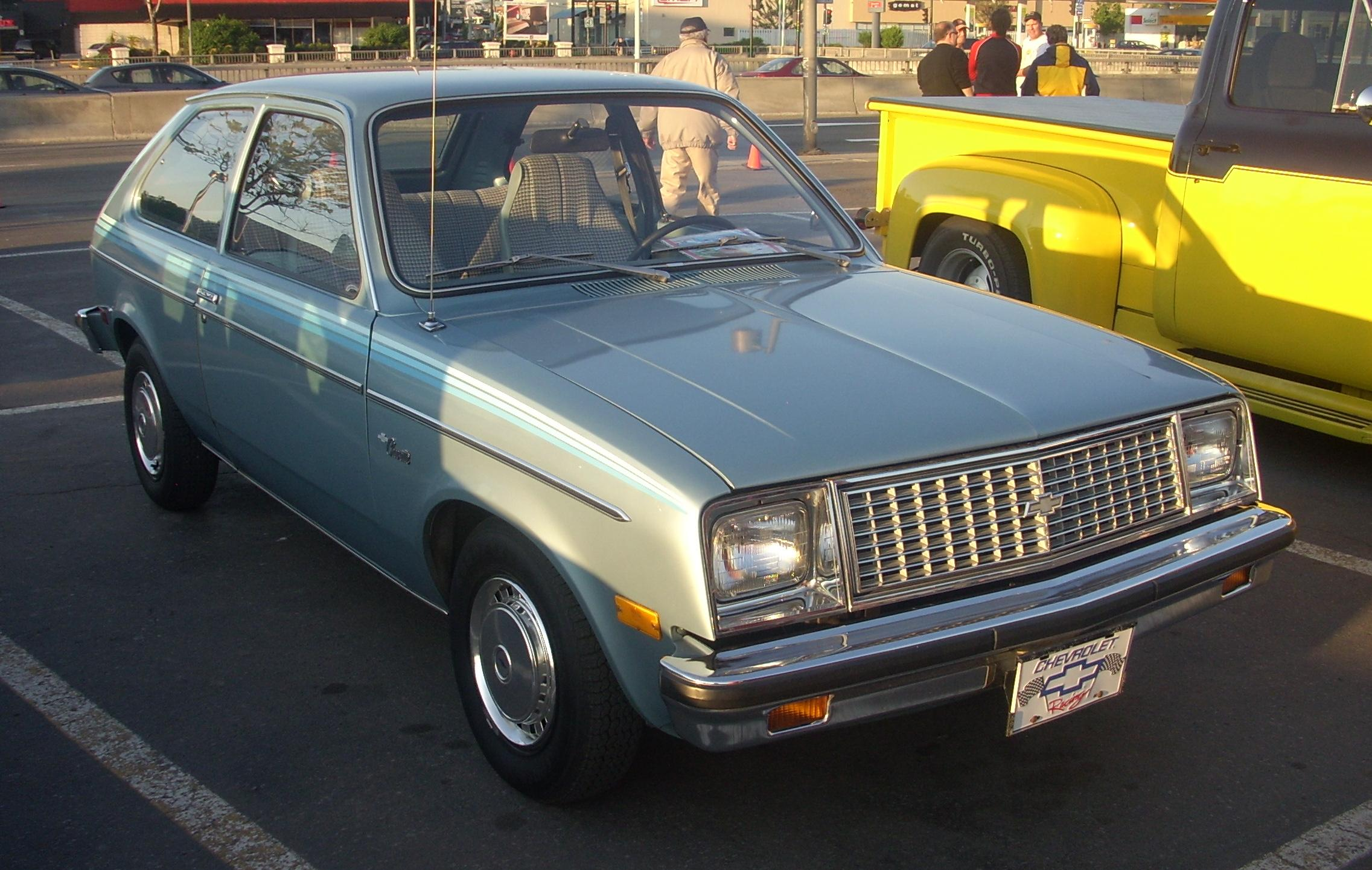
A Chevrolet Chevette for illustrative purposes

On October 12, 1980, a female hitchhiker was raped in SeaTac, Washington. The assault took place south of Seattle-Tacoma International Airport on land owned by the Port of Seattle. Port of Seattle Police described the rapist as 25 to 30 years old, driving a royal blue car with temporary license plates and cloth seats, and having a beard. The rape was reported to have occurred at 6:45 p.m. The victim walked to a nearby house, and after approximately 10 minutes of conversation, telephoned the police at 7:22 p.m. There were tire prints found near the scene which matched that of a Michelin XYZ tire, which was standard on 1981 Honda Accord LX cars, a model that was first sold in September, 1980. The victim reported that there was a large brown folder in the car and that the rapist wore a three piece suit.

Steve Titus was arrested and later identified by the victim in a line-up. Like the rapist, he had a beard. He had a new car, a royal blue Chevrolet Chevette. However, the car had neither Michelin tires nor cloth seats. The car had a large brown folder which Titus later claimed was planted in the car by the police. He did not have any suits.

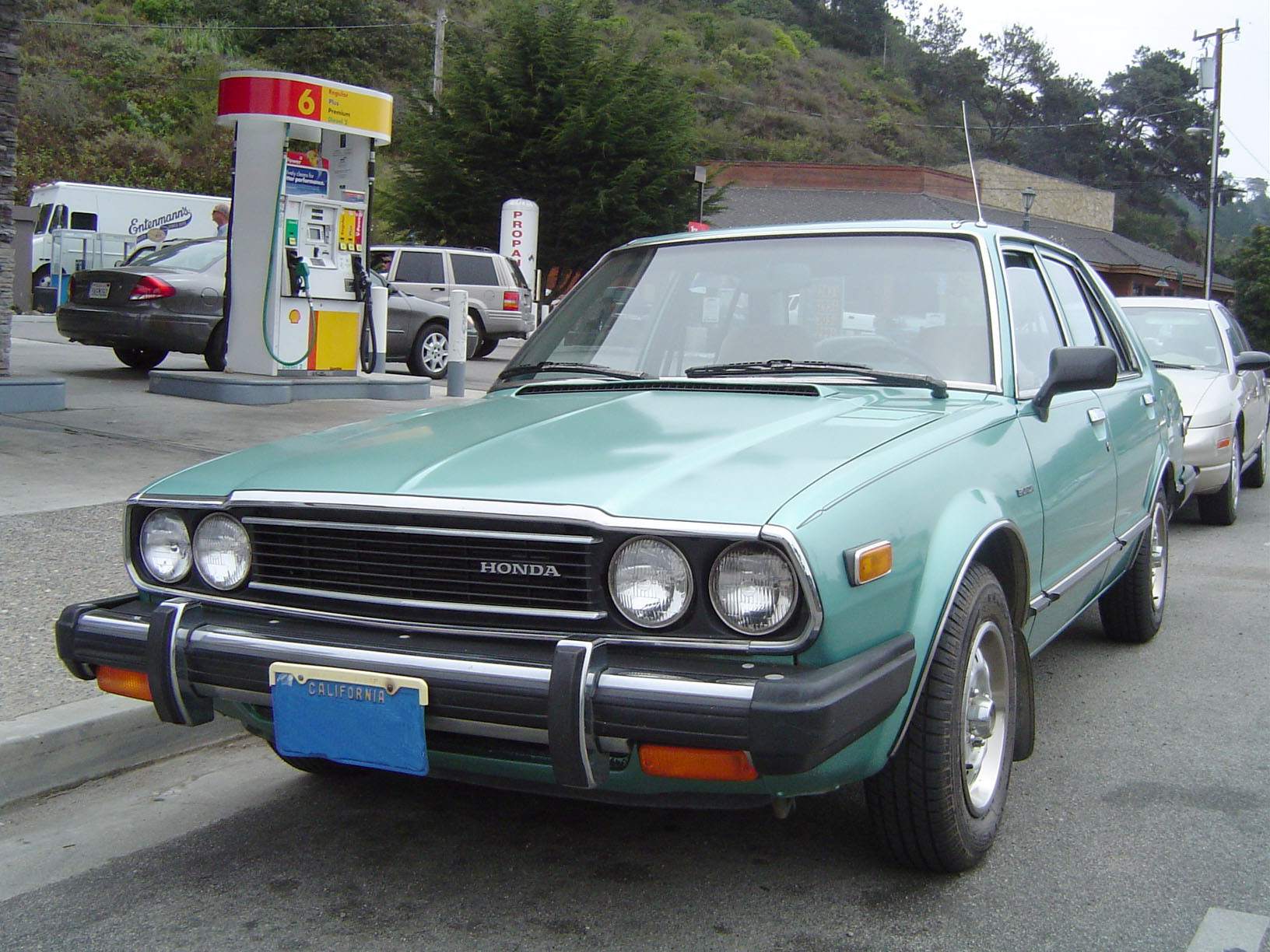
A Honda Accord for illustrative purposes

Psychologist Elizabeth Loftus argued at trial that the victim had elicited a false memory of the attacker due to a biased line up. When shown a line up of suspects the victim had initially claimed that Steve Titus was the man who looked the most similar to the attacker. Later in court the victim said that she definitely knew it was him. Her perceptions had been changed throughout the process of going to court through cues which created a false memory.

At trial prosecution testimony was changed and evidence of innocence was explained away by prosecution experts and law enforcement officers. As a direct result, Titus was wrongfully convicted of first degree rape. Working with investigative reporter Paul Henderson of the Seattle Times, Titus' new attorney, Jeff Jones, whom Titus had hired to pursue an appeal of his conviction, was able to convince the trial judge to grant a new trial based upon evidence developed by Henderson, arguing that Titus' trial attorney had been ambushed by surprise testimony which directly contradicted evidence contained in the Port of Seattle Police investigative reports. Subsequently, as a result of good police work by a local municipal police officer who had been reading the new articles about the case, a lead was developed as to a new suspect. That lead was followed up by the King County Sheriff's Office whose investigation resulted in the arrest of Edward Lee King, named by the pseudonym "Mac Smith" in Jack Olsen's book Predator: Rape, Madness, and Injustice in Seattle, who eventually confessed to the crime.

== Exculpatory evidence ==
The timeline was an important factor in the case. Titus left his parents home at 6:10 p.m on October 12, 1980, after attending his father's birthday party where there were other guests. He was seen by a coffee shop waitress at 6:20 p.m. on the day of the rape. The waitress at different times thought she had seen him at 6:30 p.m. and 7:00 p.m. Titus made a long-distance telephone call from his apartment at 7:00 p.m. on the day of the rape. The distance between the rape scene and Titus' apartment would have required a journey-time of 19½ minutes according to a Seattle Times reporter. These times would not have allowed Titus to be at the location where the victim was raped at the time she indicated the crime had occurred. He was convicted on March 4, and the conviction was overturned June 8. He only spent one night in jail after conviction.

After charges against him were dismissed, Titus sued the Port of Seattle and its Police Department, based upon evidence that their officers had changed and planted evidence, as well as convinced the victim to alter her testimony. Just before the trial, Titus died of heart failure. His parents settled and got $2 million to be paid over 20 years. The policeman accused of fabricating evidence died six years later of heart failure. Paul Henderson was awarded the Pulitzer Prize for Investigative Journalism for his reporting on this case and later became a private investigator specializing in freeing innocent people who have been convicted wrongfully.

Jack Olsen wrote a book entitled Predator: Rape, Madness, and Injustice in Seattle detailing both the conviction of Titus and the life of Edward Lee King, a convicted rapist who later confessed to this rape, and who is thought to have committed more than 50 rapes.

Edward Lee King is currently incarcerated at Stafford Creek Corrections Center in Aberdeen, Washington.

== See also ==
- List of wrongful convictions in the United States
