= Walla Walla Union-Bulletin =

- Type: Daily newspaper
- Format: Broadsheet
- Owner: The Seattle Times Company
- Staff writers: 12
- Founded: 1861 (as Washington Statesman)
- Language: English
- Headquarters: Walla Walla, Washington
- Circulation: 11,731 (as of 2022)
- ISSN: 2154-6207
- OCLC number: 17390524
- Website: union-bulletin.com

The Walla Walla Union-Bulletin (U-B) is a newspaper based in Walla Walla, Washington and owned by the Seattle Times Company. It publishes on Tuesdays, Thursdays and Saturdays.

== History ==
The modern Union-Bulletin can trace its origins to the Washington Statesman, the city's first newspaper, founded in September 1861. It began publishing weekly editions on November 29, 1861, using an old printing press acquired from the Oregon Statesman in Salem by brothers William Smith and R. B. Smith and a press from The Oregonian purchased by Major Raymond R. Rees and Nemiah Northrop. The newspaper was released on Fridays, changed its name to Walla Walla Statesman in 1864. The paper's name was changed again to the Statesman in 1878, and it became the region's first daily newspaper.

The Walla Walla Union was founded in 1868 as a Republican newspaper, to counter the Statesman's Democratic lean, and began publishing in April 1869 as a weekly and in 1881 as a daily. The Union was merged with the Statesman in 1907, coming under the common ownership of Washington Printing and Book Publishing Company.

The Walla Walla Bulletin began publication on February 12, 1906, becoming the third largest newspaper in the Walla Walla region. The Bulletin and Union were merged into the Union-Bulletin by owner John G. Kelly in 1934, who had acquired the Bulletin in 1910. The Union-Bulletin was operated as an independent newspaper until it was acquired by The Seattle Times Company on October 1, 1971.

Until February 2020, the newspaper was managed by a local publisher. A local executive team was formed in August to manage the Union-Bulletin following the departure of editor Brian Hunt, under the leadership of senior editor Dian Ver Valen. In November 2020, the Union-Bulletin acquired EO Media Group's printing press to replace its own and was contracted to print all of EO's papers moving forward. In September 2026, the paper announced plans to shutter it's printing plant and transfer all printing to The Lewiston Tribune. Ten jobs were eliminated as a result of the closure.
