= Yakima Herald-Republic =

Newspaper published in Yakima, Washington

- The July 27, 2005 front page of the Yakima Herald-Republic
- Type: Daily newspaper
- Format: Broadsheet
- Owner: The Seattle Times Company
- Founder(s): E.M. Reed; James R. Coe
- Founded: 1889
- Language: English
- Headquarters: 114 N. 4th Street; Yakima, Washington 98901; United States
- Circulation: 24,827 (as of 2022)
- Website: yakimaherald.com

The Yakima Herald-Republic is a newspaper published in Yakima, Washington, and distributed throughout Yakima, Kittitas and Klickitat counties as well as northwest Benton County.

== History ==
In January 1889, E.M. Reed acquired the printing plant of the defunct Yakima Democrat and used it to launch a successor paper. The first edition of the Yakima Herald was published on February 2, 1889. James R. Coe was a co-founder.

In 1897, Reed leased the paper to Charles F. Bailey and George N. Tuesley. At some point Baily was replaced by Robert McComb and Walter Tuesley, but both left the firm after E.L. Boardman bought a half-interest in 1904.

In 1913, George N. Tuesley sold the Herald, by then called the Yakima Morning Herald, to Colonel W.W. Robertson, owner of the Yakima Daily Republic. In 1938, Robertson died. In 1968, the Herald and Republic combined to form an all-day newspaper called the Yakima Herald-Republic.

In 1972, Harte-Hanks bought the paper from the Robertson family. In 1986, the company sold the paper to Garden State Newspapers, Inc., an affiliate of MediaNews Group. In 1991, The Seattle Times Company acquired the Herald-Republic. At that time it had a daily circulation of 40,000.

The newspaper was printed in Yakima until 2021, when The Seattle Times Company announced it would sell the Herald-Republic's headquarters and printing plant. The newspaper will instead be printed in Walla Walla by the Walla Walla Union-Bulletin.
