= Paul Henderson (journalist) =

American journalist and private investigator

Paul Henderson III (January 13, 1939 – December 7, 2018) was an American journalist and private investigator. In both roles, he helped win the freedom of 14 wrongfully convicted people, with nearly all being murder cases. He won the Pulitzer Prize for Investigative Reporting in 1982 as a reporter for The Seattle Times.

Henderson was born in Washington, D.C., but moved to Beatrice, Nebraska, as a young child. He attended Wentworth Military Academy and Junior College in Lexington, Missouri, graduating in 1959. After three years in the U.S. Army, he continued his education at Creighton University and the University of Nebraska at Omaha.

Henderson began his career as a journalist at the Council Bluffs Daily Nonpareil (1962–1966), before moving on to the Omaha World-Herald (1966–1967), and The Seattle Times (1967–1985). While working in the newsroom as an investigative reporter at The Seattle Times in 1981, Henderson took a call from a man named Steve Titus.

Titus explained to Henderson that he was about to be sentenced for a sexual assault he did not commit. Henderson looked into the case and wrote a series of three stories entitled "One Man's Battle to Clear His Name, a story of rape, wrongful conviction and vindication," challenging the circumstantial evidence against Titus. When officials followed up on Henderson's leads, they found a man who resembled Titus and who eventually confessed to the crime. The report convinced a judge to reverse Titus' conviction.

Henderson won the 1982 Pulitzer Prize for his series. Titus died of a heart attack at age 36, just as he was on the verge of winning a major wrongful-conviction settlement.

Motivated by his experience with the Titus case, Henderson left the Seattle Times in 1985 to become a private investigator. Since 1988, Henderson had been an investigator for Centurion Ministries, a small nonprofit organization based in Princeton, New Jersey, dedicated to vindicating the wrongfully convicted. They have helped free more than 30 people.

In addition to winning the Pulitzer, Henderson is also the winner of the C.B. Blethan Award (1977 and 1982), the Roy W. Howard Newspaper Award, Scripps-Howard Foundation (1982), and he was named an Outstanding Achiever by the American Academy of Achievement (1982).

Henderson died on December 7, 2018, at the age of 79 from lung cancer.
