= Seattle Times Building =

Former headquarters of The Seattle Times newspaper

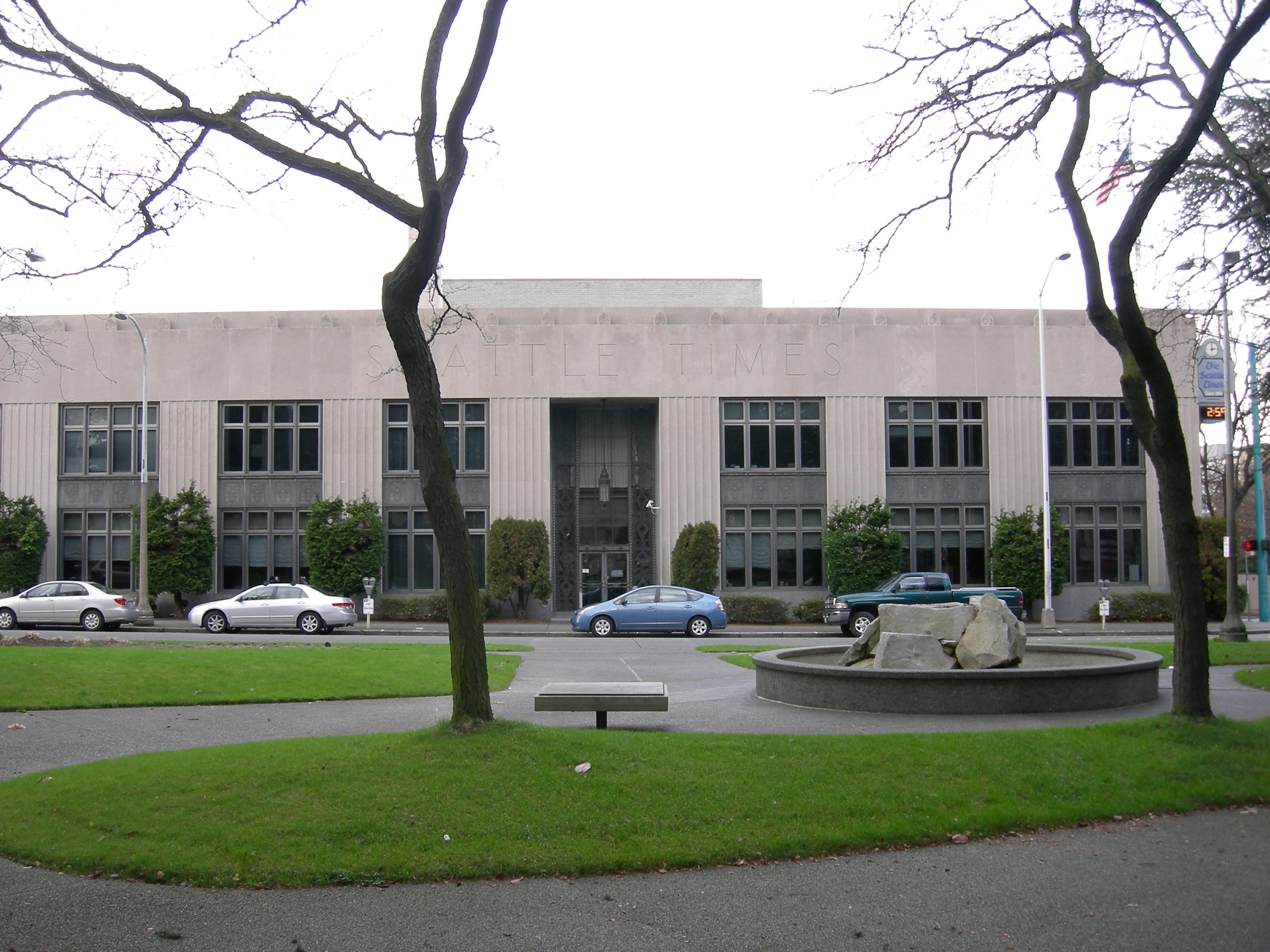
- The building's exterior in 2007
- Interactive map of the Seattle Times Building area

General information
- Type: Office building
- Architectural style: Art Deco
- Location: Seattle, Washington, U.S., 1120 John Street
- Coordinates: 47°37′12.8″N 122°20′06.5″W
- Opened: March 2, 1931
- Renovated: 1947, 1964, 1968, 1979
- Closed: 2011
- Demolished: 2016–2017
- Client: The Seattle Times
- Owner: Onni Group

Height
- Height: 27 feet (8.2 m)

Technical details
- Material: Reinforced concrete, Indiana limestone
- Floor count: 5

Design and construction
- Architect: Robert C. Reamer
- Architecture firm: Metropolitan Building Company
- Main contractor: Teufel & Carlson Builders

Seattle Landmark
- Designated: March 11, 1996

The Seattle Times Building was an office building in the South Lake Union neighborhood of Seattle, Washington, United States. It served as the former headquarters of The Seattle Times from 1931 to 2011, replacing the earlier Times Square Building. The three-story building was originally built in 1931 and later expanded to accommodate more office space and larger presses.

The exterior and roof of the Seattle Times Building were designated a city landmark in 1996. Designed by Robert C. Reamer with elements of the Art Deco and Moderne styles, the reinforced concrete building was representative of early 20th century architecture in Seattle.

The newspaper moved out of the building in 2011 and sold it in 2013 to Onni Group, a Canadian real estate developer, who plans to build four residential skyscrapers on the site and adjacent parking lot to the south. Onni plans to preserve the building's facade and integrate it into the podium of a 240-foot-tall (73 m) building, converting it into a rooftop balcony. Demolition of the building began in October 2016, after incidents involving squatters on the property.

== Architecture and design ==
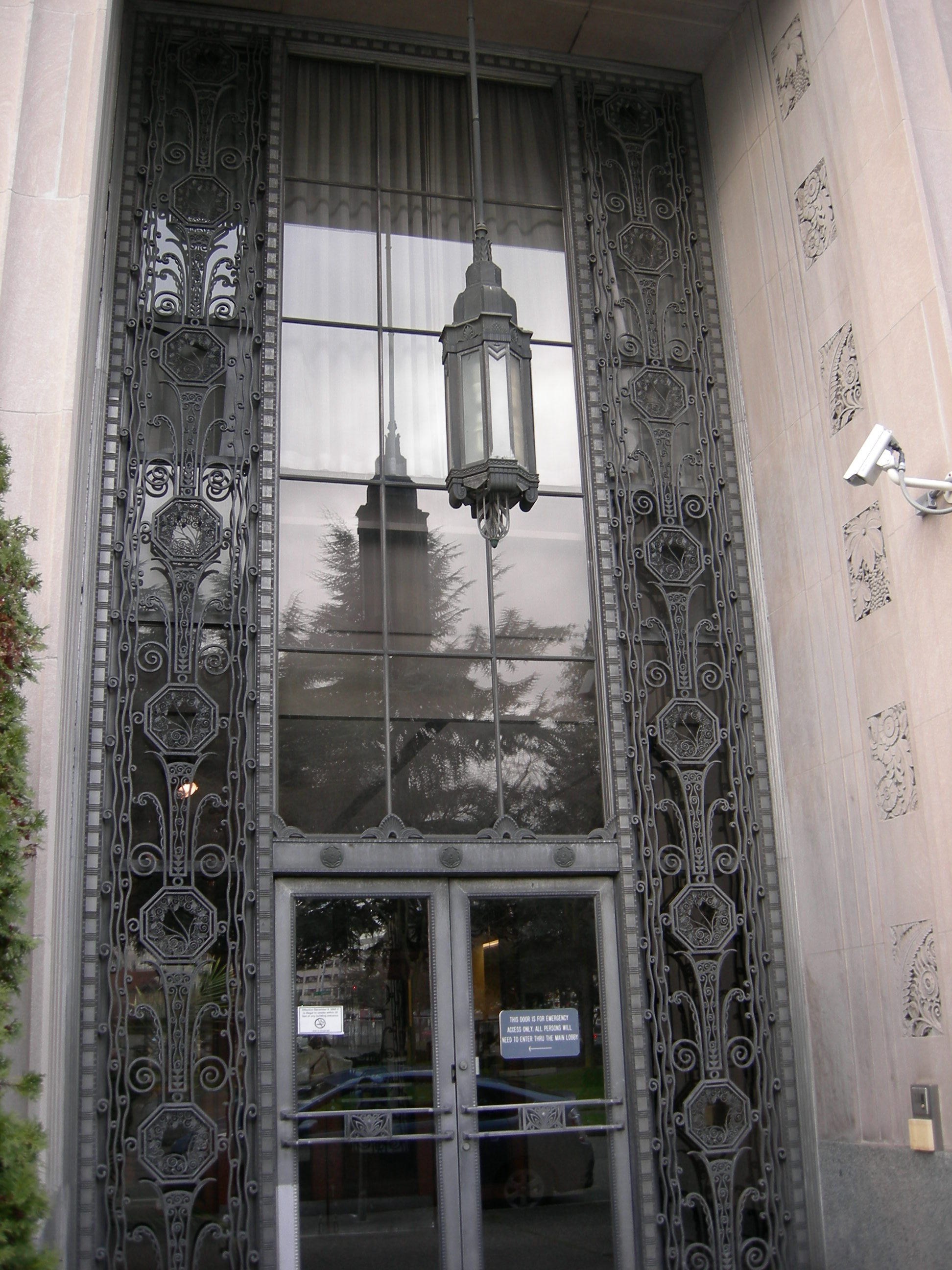
The main entrance of the building, photographed in 2007

The Seattle Times Building was situated on a full city block bounded to the south by John Street, to the west by Boren Avenue North, to the north by Thomas Street, and to the east by Fairview Avenue North; the complex was located in the South Lake Union neighborhood north of Denny Way. The complex was composed of six buildings, including the original office building and printing plant built in 1931 and several additions. Most of the buildings were made of reinforced concrete, with some Indiana limestone used in the oldest buildings' facades.

The original building, which measured 135 feet (41 m) long, 68 feet (21 m) wide, and 24 feet (7.3 m) high, was designed in 1930 by Robert C. Reamer, noted for his work in Seattle's Metropolitan Tract as well as Yellowstone National Park. The building was described as an Art Deco piece featuring elements that would later be used in Moderne architecture. Its symmetrical columns and massing were drawn from Beaux Arts classicism, with elements of minimalism; Reamer was also influenced by Paul Philippe Cret's calls for "starved classicism".

The front entrance of the 1931 office building, on the southeast corner of the block, faced south on John Street towards Downtown Seattle and had the newspaper's name etched into the stone above the main entrance; the sign was supplemented for several decades by an ornate golden sign with the newspaper's letterhead that was installed above the main entrance. The exterior of the office building had subtle details, including etched columns and aluminum grillwork on the windows, forgoing ornaments for a simpler design that emphasized its mass. The main entrance was behind an elaborate aluminum gate, decorated with octagons, spirals and floral patterns. At the sides of the entrance were limestone panels with floral patterns carved into relief.

Inside the public lobby of the building were walls and floors made of light tan Botticino marble, the latter in a terrazzo pattern. The rest of the building used rubber tile for flooring, colored green and brown. The printing plant attached to the office building, as well as the later additions, had simpler designs cast entirely in reinforced concrete.

== History ==
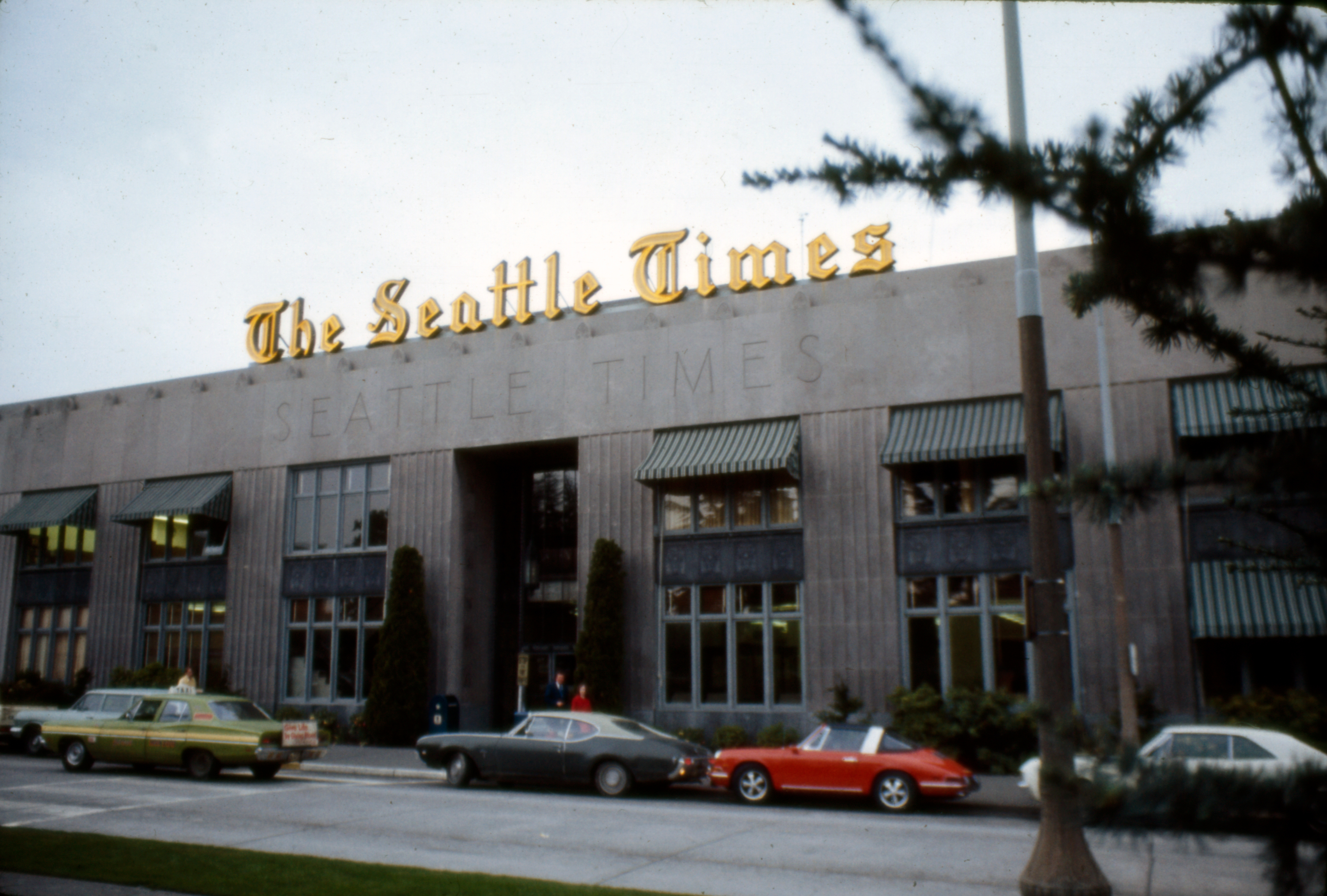
The Times Building facing John Street in the 1970s, featuring the golden Times logo installed in 1947

From 1916 onward, the Blethen Building near modern-day McGraw Square was the headquarters and printing plant for The Seattle Times, one of Seattle's two daily newspapers. The newspaper had been founded in 1896 and moved from two previous offices and printing plants, each time relocating further and further north of the city's historic central business district. By 1930, the newspaper's circulation averaged over 100,000 copies per day and the strain of its growth had caused the location to run out of office space and present logistical problems with printing and distribution, especially as Stewart Street, used by delivery trucks and nicknamed "Times Alley", had grown to become a major thoroughfare for automobile traffic.

In the summer of 1929, The Seattle Times Company unveiled plans to build a new complex of buildings along Fairview Avenue in the Cascade neighborhood for their new offices and printing plant, to be a modern class A office with 120,000 square feet (11,000 m^{2}) of floor space. The old building was built to be readily converted into a traditional office building; previous plans had called for the building to be raised to nine stories to accommodate the newspaper's growth. A groundbreaking ceremony was held by the newspaper's staff and the Metropolitan Building Company on September 26, 1929, both of whom expected the project to be completed the following year. The building's foundations were designed and built to support a possible 20- to 30-story skyscraper above the three-story office. The $1.25 million project (equivalent to $26.46 million in 2025) was partially funded through $600,000 in bonds advertised in the Times. Construction on the site began on June 9, 1930, with major excavation by general contractors Teufel & Carlson.

To prepare for the moving of printing presses, the Times began publishing shorter versions of its dailies in December 1930. The newspaper began publishing at the new building on March 2, 1931, using a press capable of printing 40,000 copies per hour. The new facility was heralded as "the finest plant yet built for an American newspaper" by the paper's publisher, C.B. Blethen; other newspapers from around the state of Washington congratulated the Times on their move and complimented the building and plant on their modernity and functionality. The building's location on Fairview Avenue gave rise to a nickname, "Fairview Fanny", coined by Teamster columnist Ed Donohoe to refer the newspaper's reputation as a stodgy and slow-to-change paper.

=== Additions and renovations ===
The first major addition to the building, a three-story office building with 7,500 square feet (700 m^{2}) of floor space primarily for the classified advertisements department, was completed to the west in 1947. The $125,000 project was postponed during World War II because of a shortage in materials, resulting in cramped conditions as circulation had, during the building's 16-year history, doubled to more than 175,000 daily and 225,000 on Sundays. A gold, illuminated sign with the Times logo in 6-foot-tall (1.8 m) letters was also placed atop the building's entrance on John Street. In 1950, the building was expanded to the north by 150,000 square feet (14,000 m^{2}), housing a larger mailing room, a new newsroom, and offices for the Associated Press bureau and Sunday departments. A clock and temperature sign on the southeast corner of the building was installed in December 1959, with text reading "Today's News Today"; it sparked comparisons to the Seattle Post-Intelligencer's globe that was installed in 1948, used as symbols of each paper's philosophy. The clock was later changed to read "Since 1896" and a digital temperature display was added below; it was stopped permanently at 2:40 when the building was vacated.

Post-war growth in newspaper readership prompted an even larger, $3.5 million expansion in 1964 to fit eight-unit presses and a new three-story press room to the west of the printing plant. Four years later, an even larger $6 million addition would use up the last of the surface parking lots on the property's block, building a two-story newsroom clad in reinforced concrete instead of the limestone used on the 1931 building; a skybridge was built across an alley to connect to the older office building. In 1979, the new newsroom was renovated and modernized and a nearby alley was filled and enclosed.

On May 23, 1983, the Seattle Post-Intelligencer began its joint operating agreement with the Times, leading to both newspapers printing their dailies and combined Sunday edition at the Seattle Times Building; the joint operation would cease in 2009 after the P-I ceased publication and moved to an online-only format. The move prompted the Times to purchase additional land for future expansion, including the Troy Laundry Building to the north, for a total of 14 acres (5.7 ha) in the South Lake Union neighborhood. Printing of both papers would later be supplemented by a $150 million satellite plant in Bothell that opened in 1992, with options to build other plants in Renton and downtown Seattle reportedly under consideration.

== Planned redevelopment ==
External image
- Rendering of proposed use of Times Building as a rooftop deck (DJC)

On March 11, 1996, the Seattle City Council designated the exterior and roof of the original 1931 building as a Seattle city landmark, having approved a recommendation from the Landmarks Preservation Board. The move was prompted by a long-term proposal from The Seattle Times Company to redevelop their land in South Lake Union, at a cost of $150 million while preserving the historic character of the two buildings. The plans included two 10-story office buildings, a larger printing plant, and a multilevel parking garage.

The Seattle Times Company began selling parcels of its land in South Lake Union to real estate developers in 2004 to avoid layoffs and to pay for legal fees during a court battle against the Seattle Post-Intelligencer. In January 2011, The Times Company announced their plans to move out of the Seattle Times Building and into the 1000 Denny Building a block away, with the former building readied for redevelopment. The following year, the company began marketing the two remaining blocks they owned, including the Times Building and a parking lot to the south, asking for $80 million total. A rezone of South Lake Union was approved by the city council in May 2013, allowing for buildings as tall as 240 feet (73 m) on the properties.

On July 31, 2013, The Times Company announced that the two blocks would be sold to Vancouver-based developer Onni Group for $62.5 million, with $29 million paid for the Times Building in November. In November, the group unveiled their proposal to build four high-rise residential towers on the two blocks, including two 240-foot-tall (73 m) towers over the Seattle Times Building. The building's landmarked facades are planned to be preserved and restored, and used as a retail podium with a rooftop plaza. In 2018, the company submitted new plans for the block that would include two office towers of 16 and 17 stories.

=== Squatting incidents ===
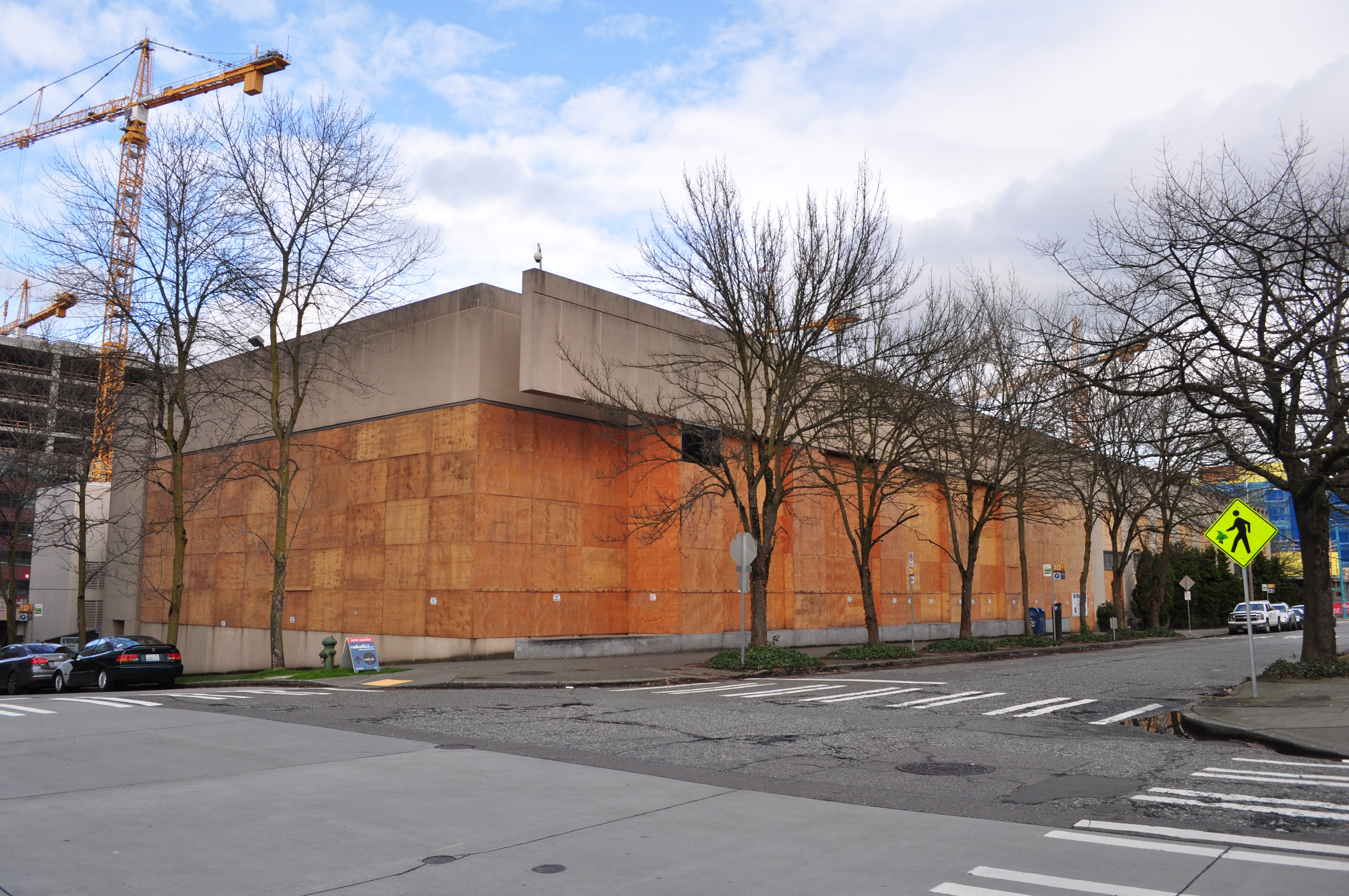
The building in 2016, boarded up in preparation for demolition

Since the site was sold to Onni in 2013, a series of incidents with squatters and vandals have drawn attention to security issues at the vacant building. In October 2014, the city of Seattle began exploring legal action over Onni's failure to secure the site; KIRO-TV reported that at least 10 squatters occupied the building, whose first floor had been boarded up.

On September 30, 2015, the Seattle Police Department cleared the building of squatters, an estimated 50 to 200 people, after unsuccessful attempts by Onni to secure the property. Prior to the operation, the city had received several complaints and medical calls to the building in response to drug overdoses.

A series of fires in November 2015, December 2015, and July 2016 led to a proposal by the city to accelerate the demolition permitting process for the site. Seattle Fire Department operations battalion chief Bryan Hatings called the building a "death trap" after the July 2016 fire, and reported at least 10 to 12 squatters had been living there.

=== Demolition and construction ===
The demolition of the building's north and west side began in October 2016. The west side addition was fully demolished by March 2017, and other portions of the complex were demolished by September 2017. Two sides of the facade were preserved and are planned to be integrated into the new building. An investigation of the site found potential contamination of soils by waste oils and liquids that had been stored in at least eleven underground storage tanks during the building's tenure as a printing plant. A cleanup agreement between Onni and the Washington State Department of Ecology was reached in June 2022 to conduct soil decontamination work.

Work was paused for several years until a master use permit was issued by the city government in March 2022. Excavation of the five-story underground parking garage at the site began later that year. The project, named 1120 John, was planned to include 935,951 square feet (86,952.7 m^{2}) of office and retail space in two buildings that are 16 and 18 stories tall. The complex, designed by Perkins&Will, included skybridges between the two buildings over a central courtyard; 22,000 square feet (2,000 m^{2}) of retail space for a grocery store was also included. Construction on 1120 John was paused again in November 2023 due to a requested design change for the parking garage submitted by Perkins&Will. The project was converted into residential by Onni Group in 2024 under architect Perkins Eastman. The updated proposal is for 814 units in a 14-story building and a 49-story building over the partially-built, four-story underground garage. The east side of the block, facing Boren Avenue, is planned to become a 11-story office building.
