= Seattle Landmarks Preservation Board =

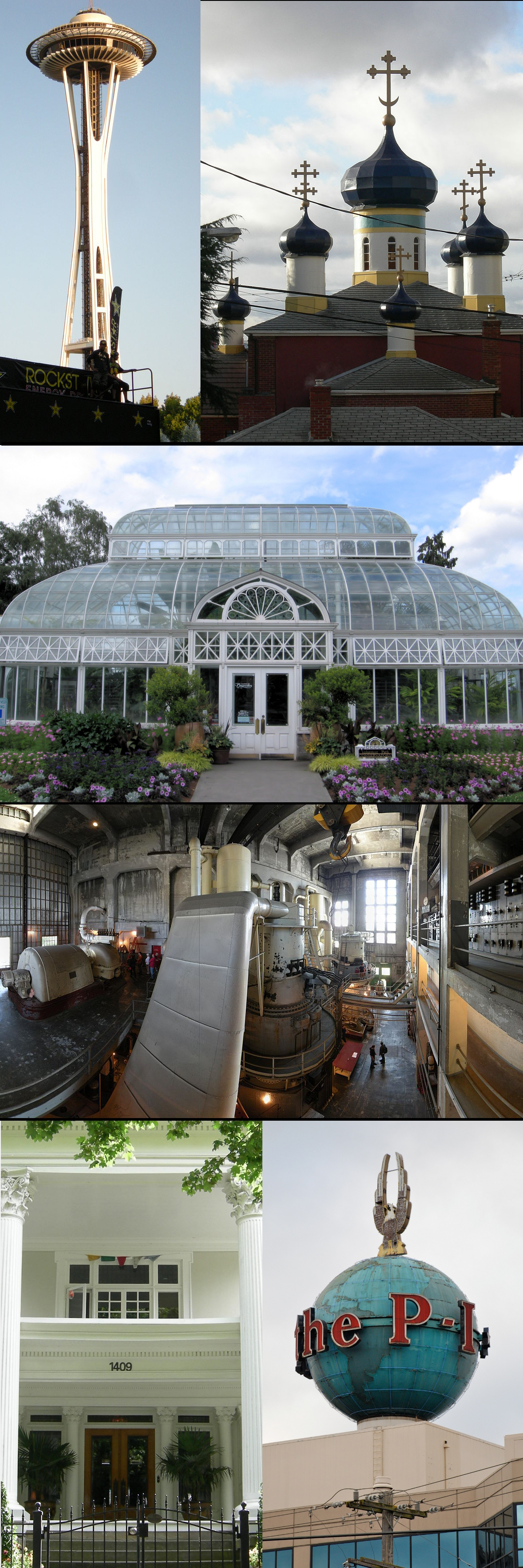
Some designated Seattle Landmarks. Top to bottom and left to right: 1. Space Needle; 2. St. Spiridon Russian Orthodox Cathedral; 3. Volunteer Park Conservatory; 4. Georgetown PowerPlant Museum (interior view of turbine hall); 5. 1409 East Prospect Street, immediately across the street from the south entrance to Volunteer Park; 6. The P-I Globe

The City of Seattle Landmarks Preservation Board is responsible for designating and preserving structures of historical importance in Seattle, Washington. The board recommends actions to the Seattle City Council, which fashions these into city ordinances with the force of law. The board is part of the city's Department of Neighborhoods.

The board consists of eleven members appointed by the mayor and approved by the city council. By its establishing ordinance, the board must include at least two architects, two historians, one member of the City Planning Commission, one structural engineer, and one person each representing the fields of finance and real estate management. As of 2015, more than 450 individual Seattle sites, buildings, vehicles, vessels, and street clocks have been designated as Seattle Landmarks subject to protection by city ordinance.

== History ==
The board was established in 1973 as part of a rise in consciousness about historic preservation in Seattle and elsewhere. In 1966 the federal government passed the National Historic Preservation Act. In Seattle, Allied Arts, Victor Steinbrueck, Ralph Anderson, Richard White, and Alan Black, among others, reacted to proposals to radically redevelop Pioneer Square and Pike Place Market by agitating for a more preservationist approach. These two districts were designated as "historic" by the city in 1970 and 1971, respectively. The city then passed a Landmarks Preservation Ordinance, establishing what was originally the Office of Historic Preservation and now consists of the Landmarks Preservation Board and some other portions of the Department of Neighborhoods.

== Designated landmarks and historic districts ==
Besides individual landmarks, Seattle has eight historic districts: Ballard Avenue, Columbia City, Fort Lawton, Harvard-Belmont, the International District, Pike Place Market, Pioneer Square, and Sand Point. Pioneer Square is a neighborhood dating back to Seattle's earliest years and contains many buildings from shortly after the Great Seattle Fire of 1889; the adjacent International District is the historic center of Seattle's Asian and Pacific Islander community, with many buildings dating from 1905-1910 after the neighborhood was regraded; Pike Place Market is a public market founded in 1907 and including some buildings older than that; Fort Lawton (in Discovery Park) and Sand Point (in Magnuson Park) are the sites of former military facilities; Ballard Avenue and the Columbia City district were the urban centers of separate cities that Seattle annexed as it grew; the Harvard-Belmont district includes some of Seattle's most prestigious residential buildings.

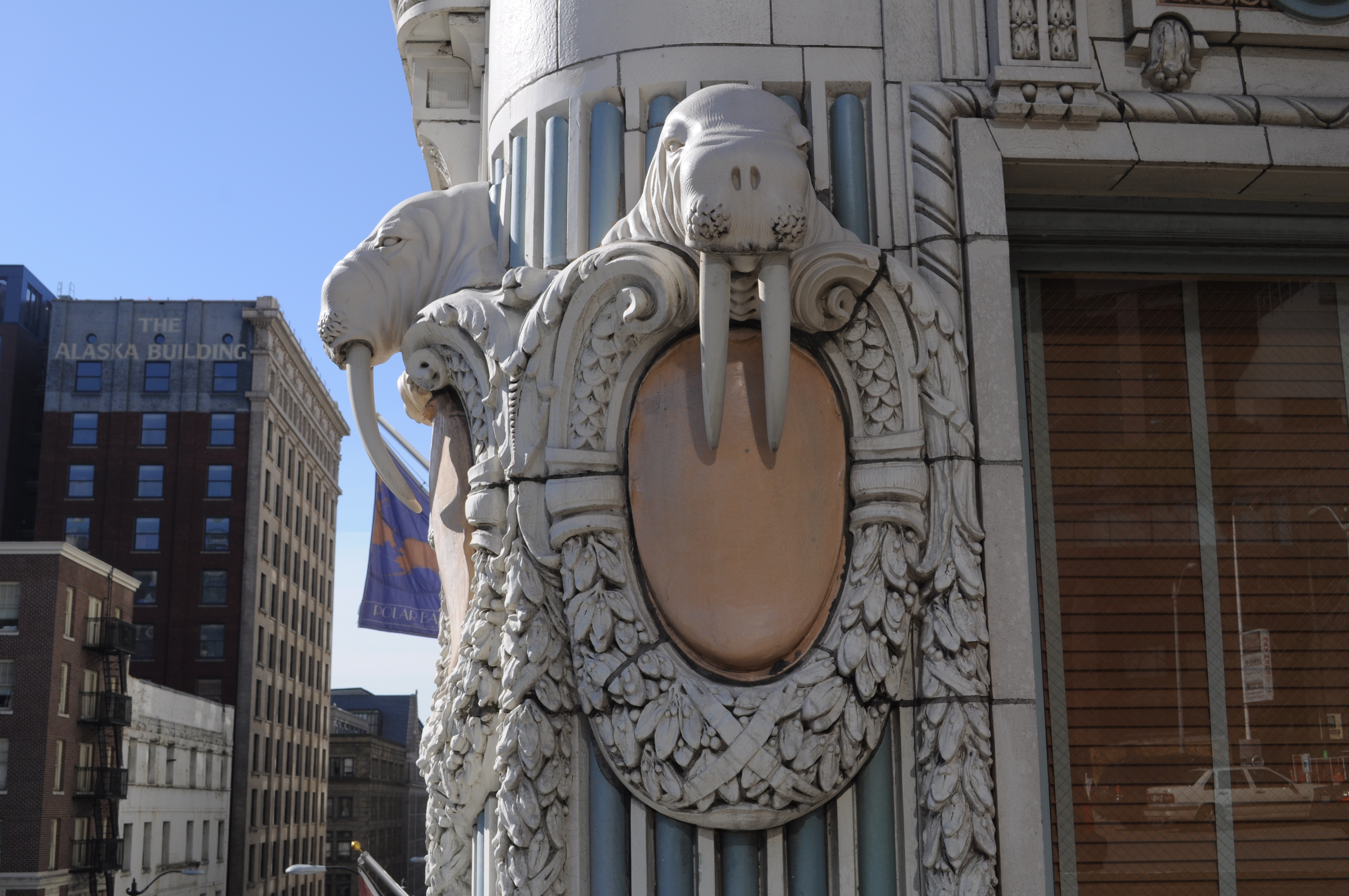
Terracotta detail, Arctic Building. The walrus's current tusks are plastic, as an earthquake safety precaution.

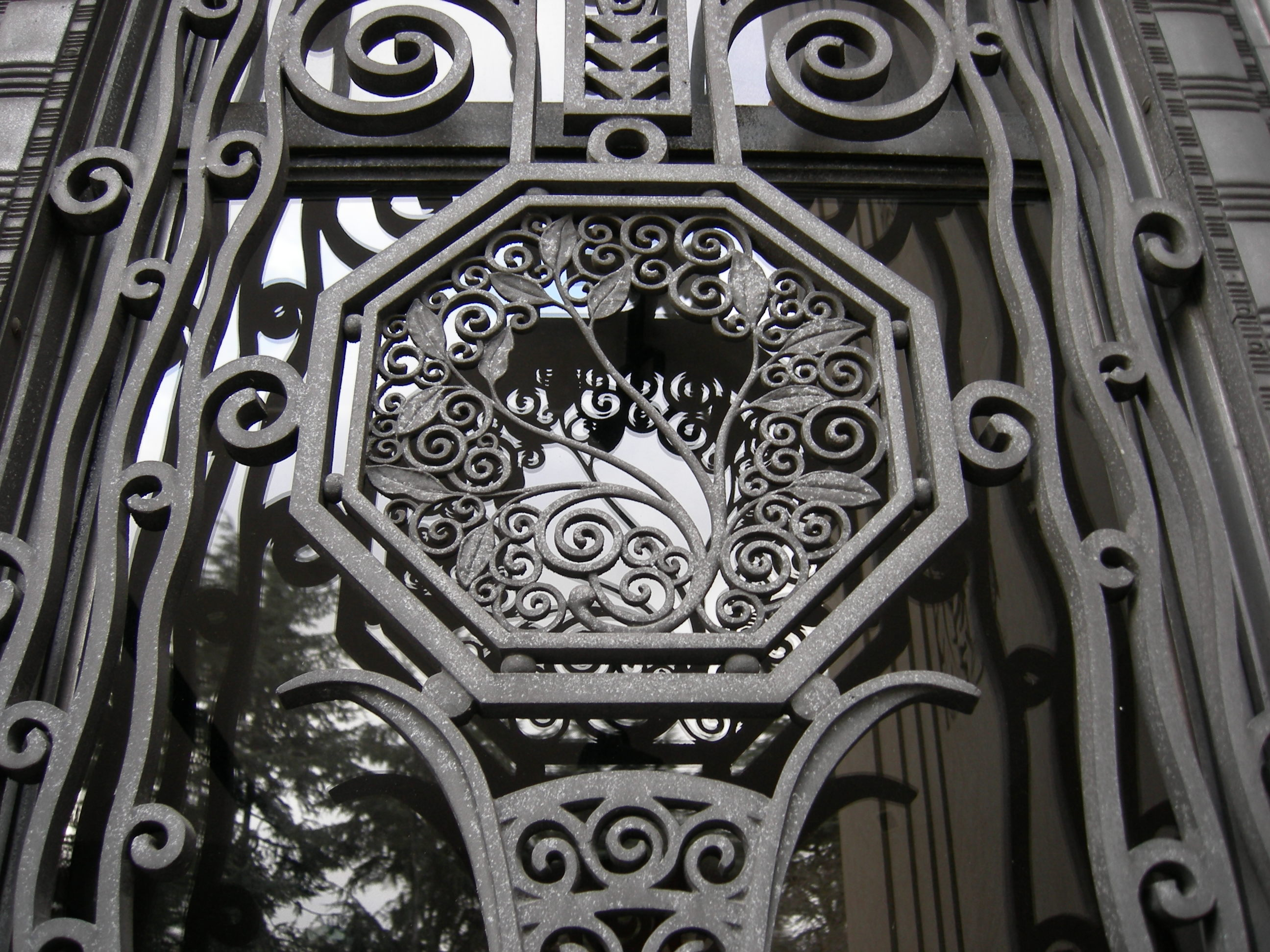
Ornamental grating, Seattle Times Building, 1120 John Street (South Lake Union)

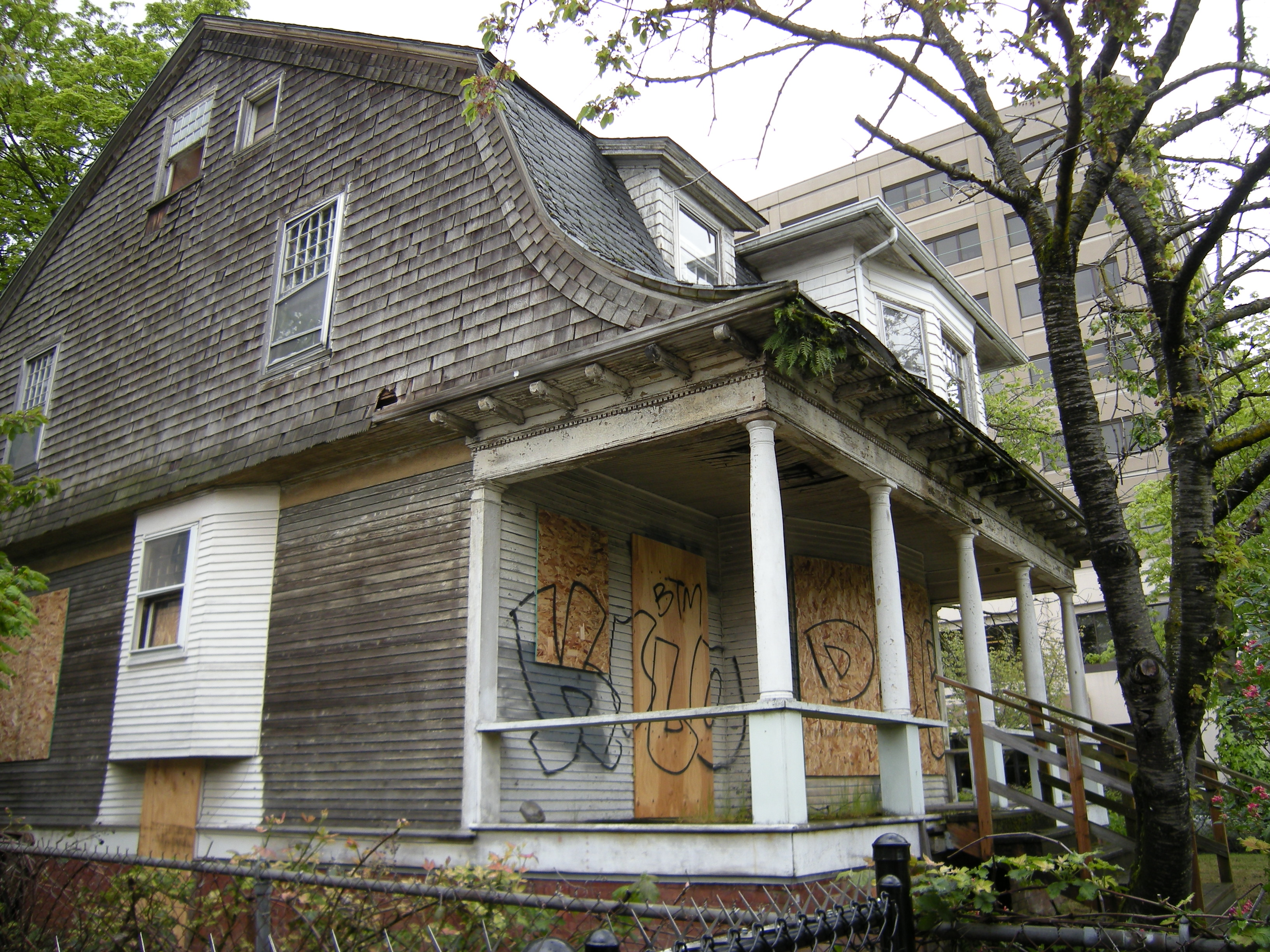
The Carmack House, demolished in 2015 despite its landmark status

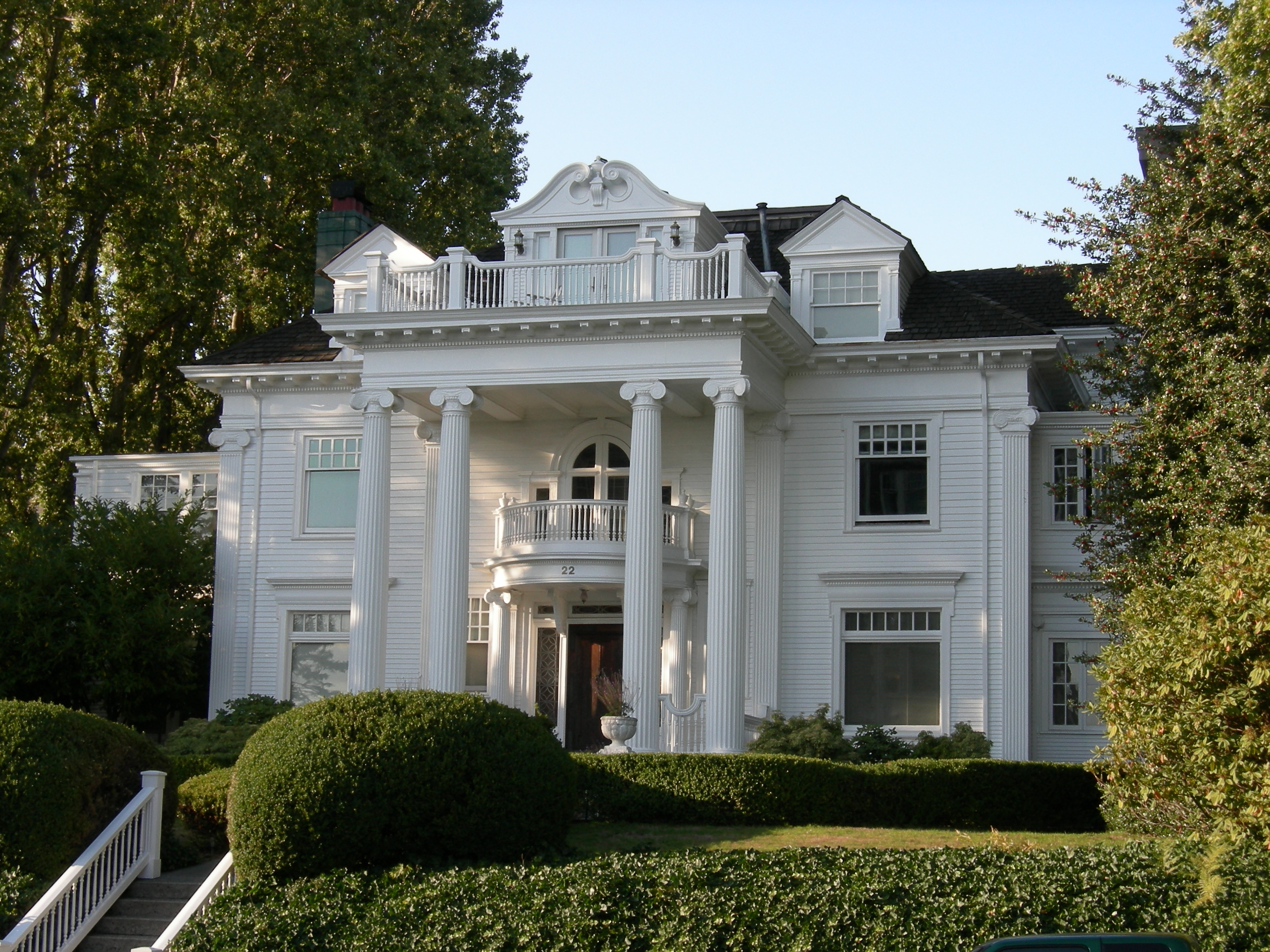
The Ballard-Howe House

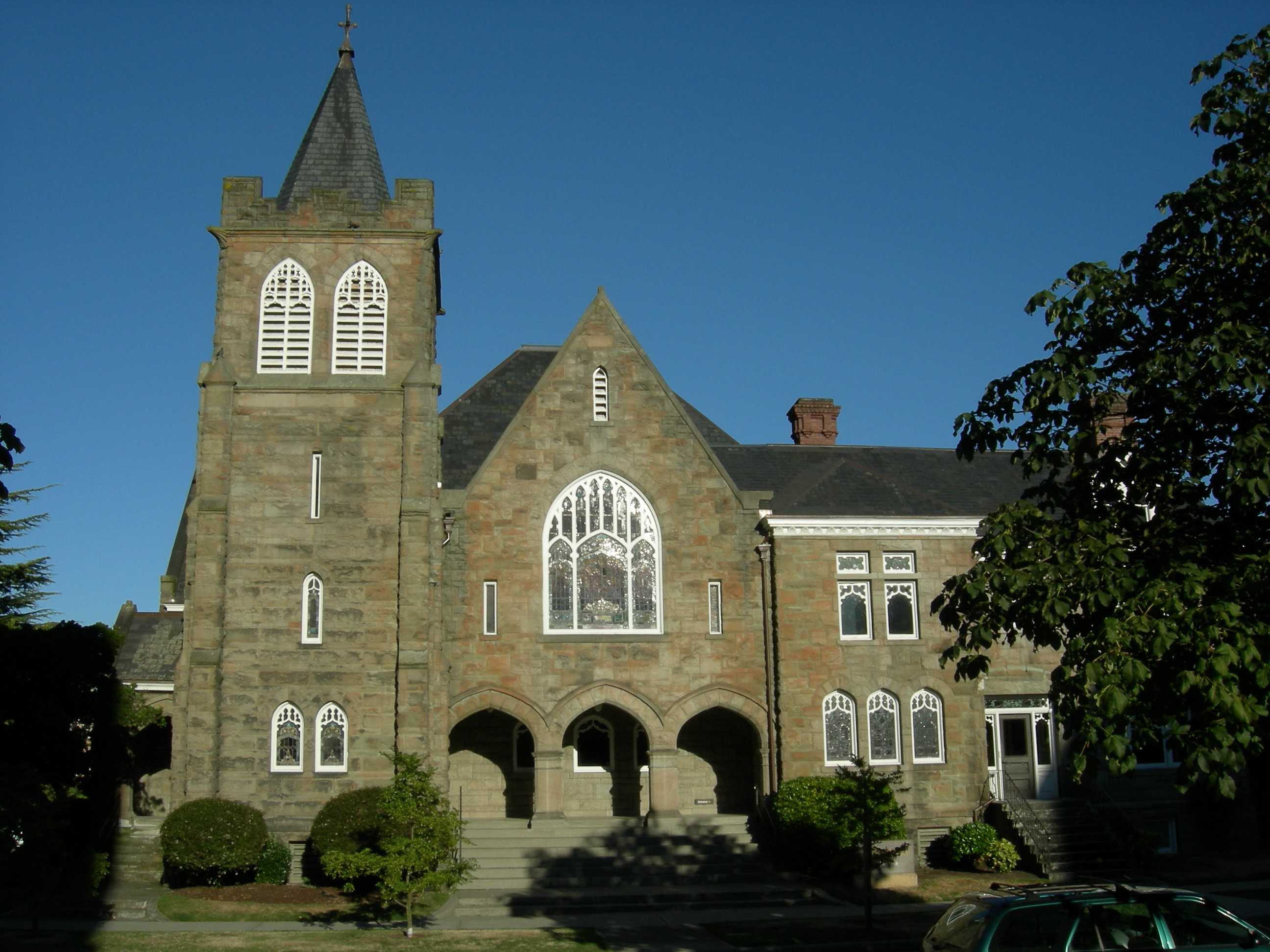
The former Capitol Hill United Methodist Church, now home to Catalysis Corporation

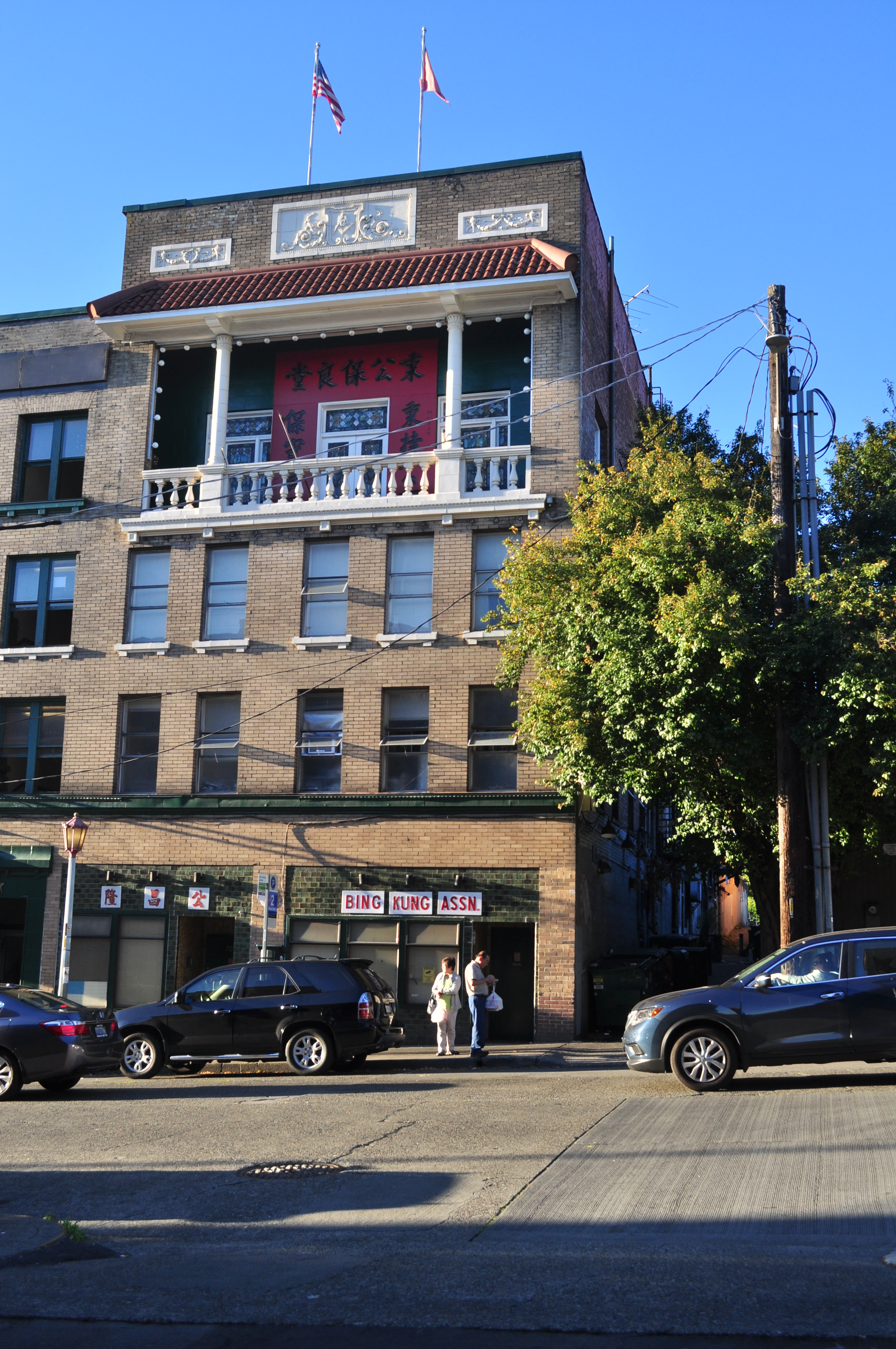
Seattle Bing Kung Association Building, a typical contributing property of the International District

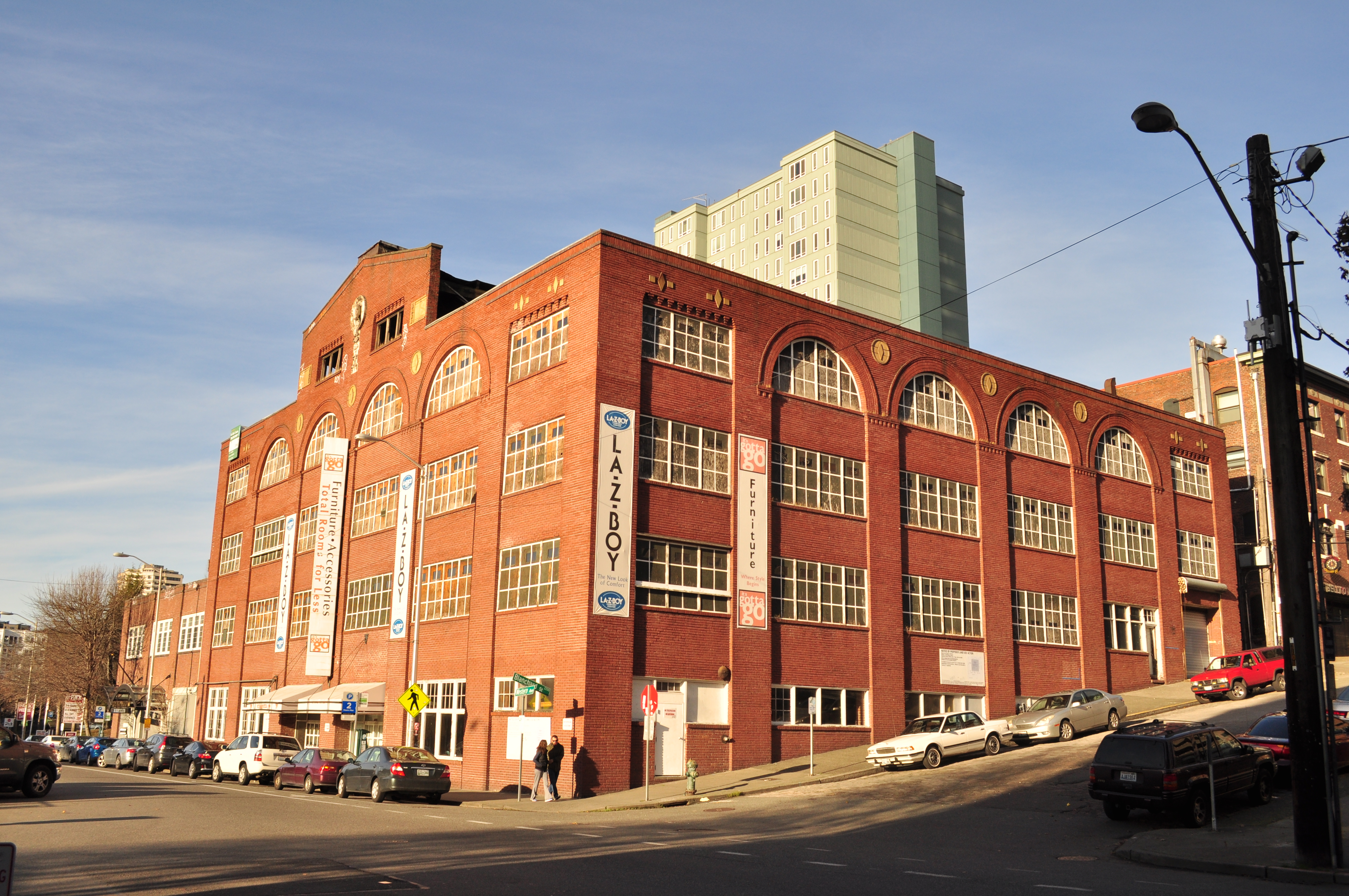
Union Stables

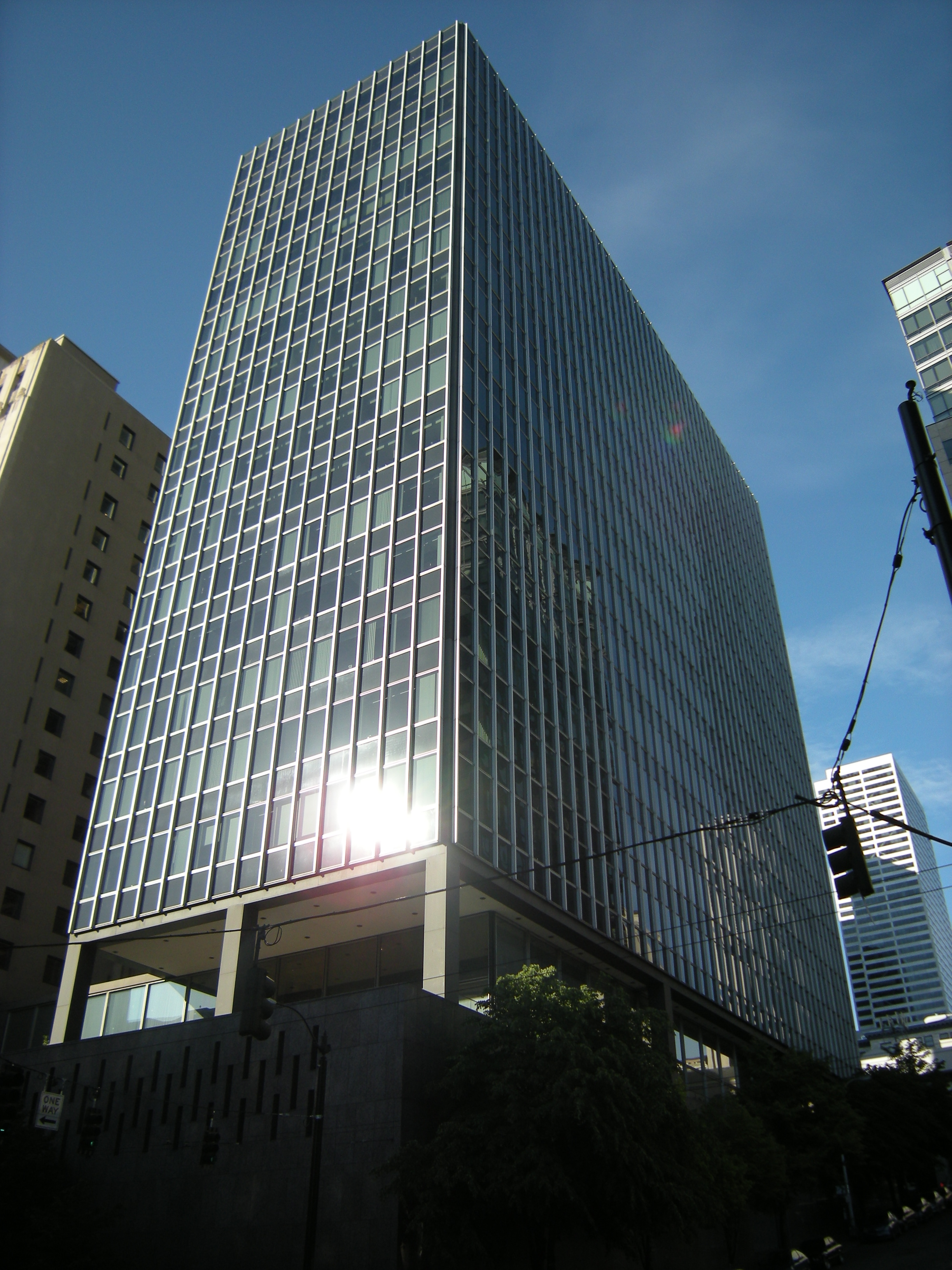
The Norton Building

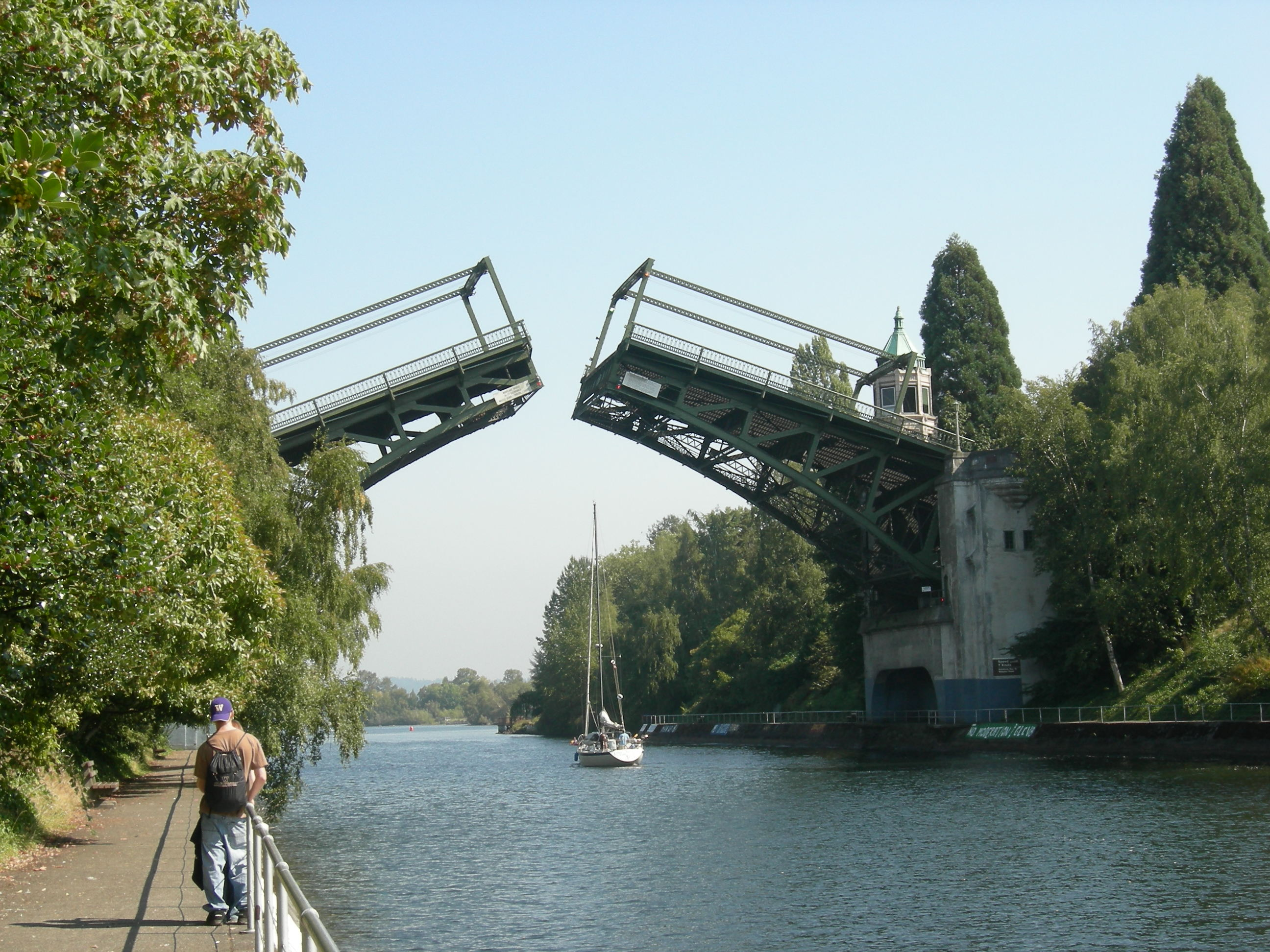
The Montlake Bridge, landmarked along with the Montlake Cut, which it spans

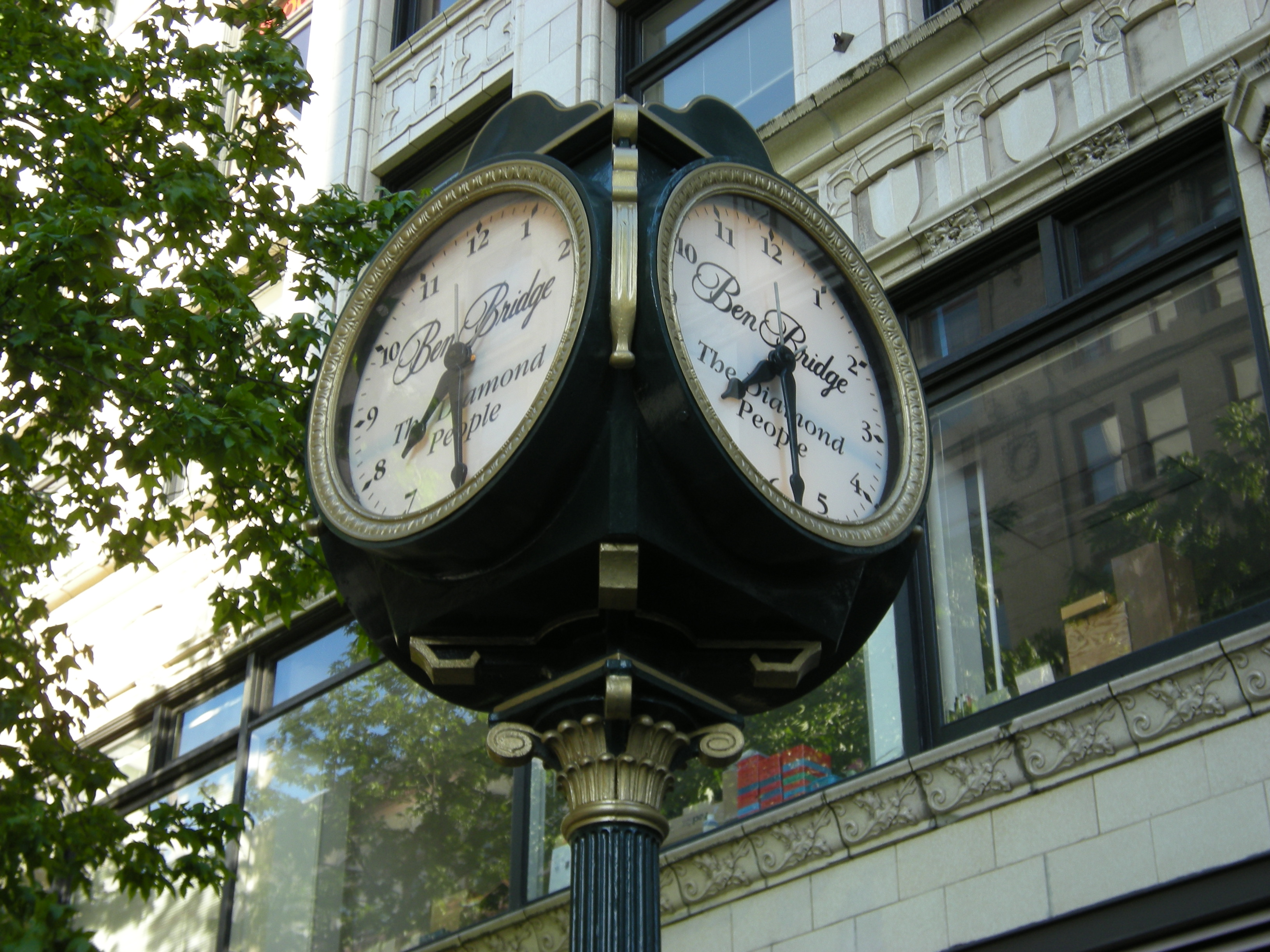
Ben Bridge Jewelers street clock, one of several street clocks designated as landmarks

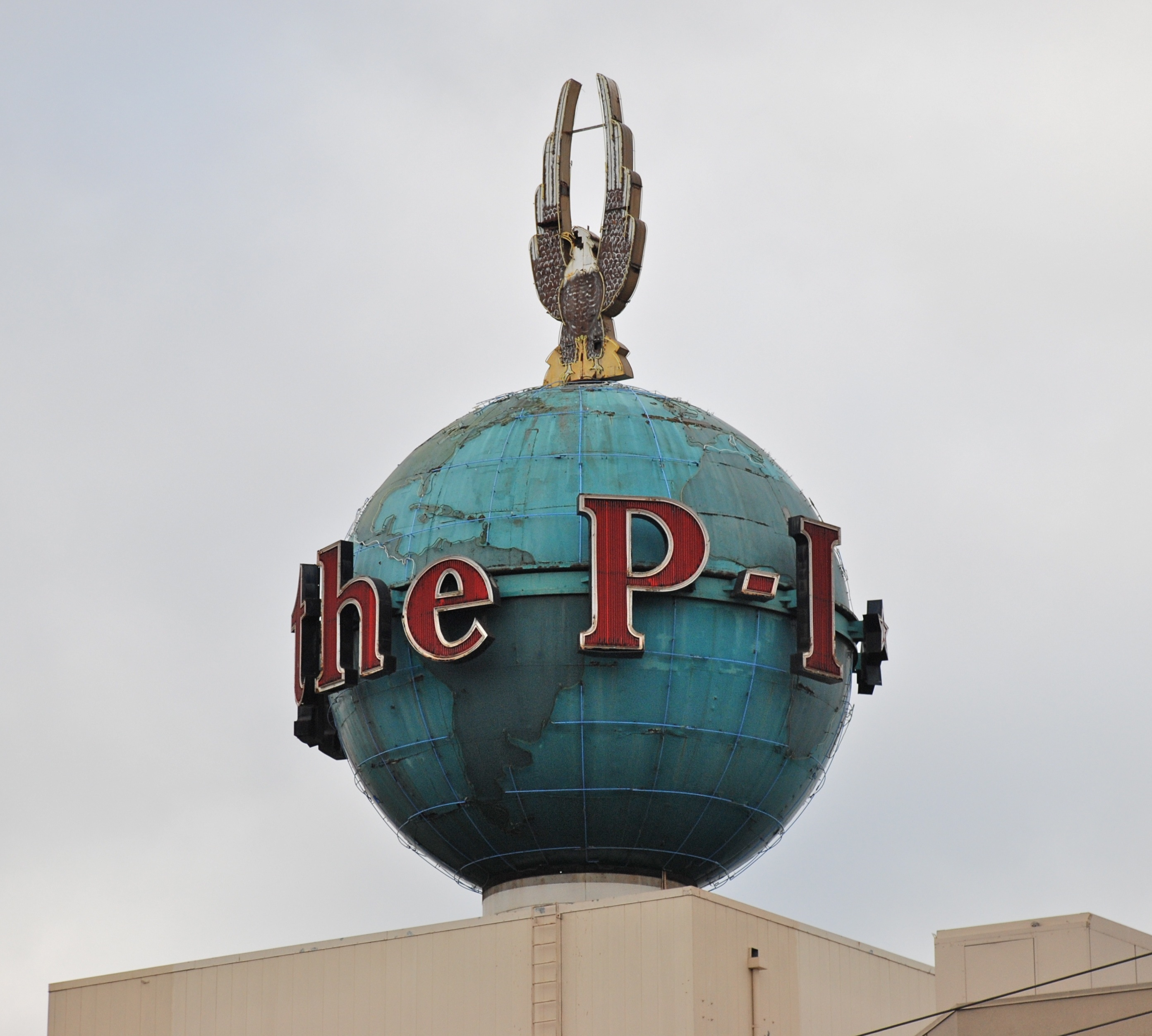
The "P-I Globe", symbol of the Seattle Post-Intelligencer, landmarked in its own right

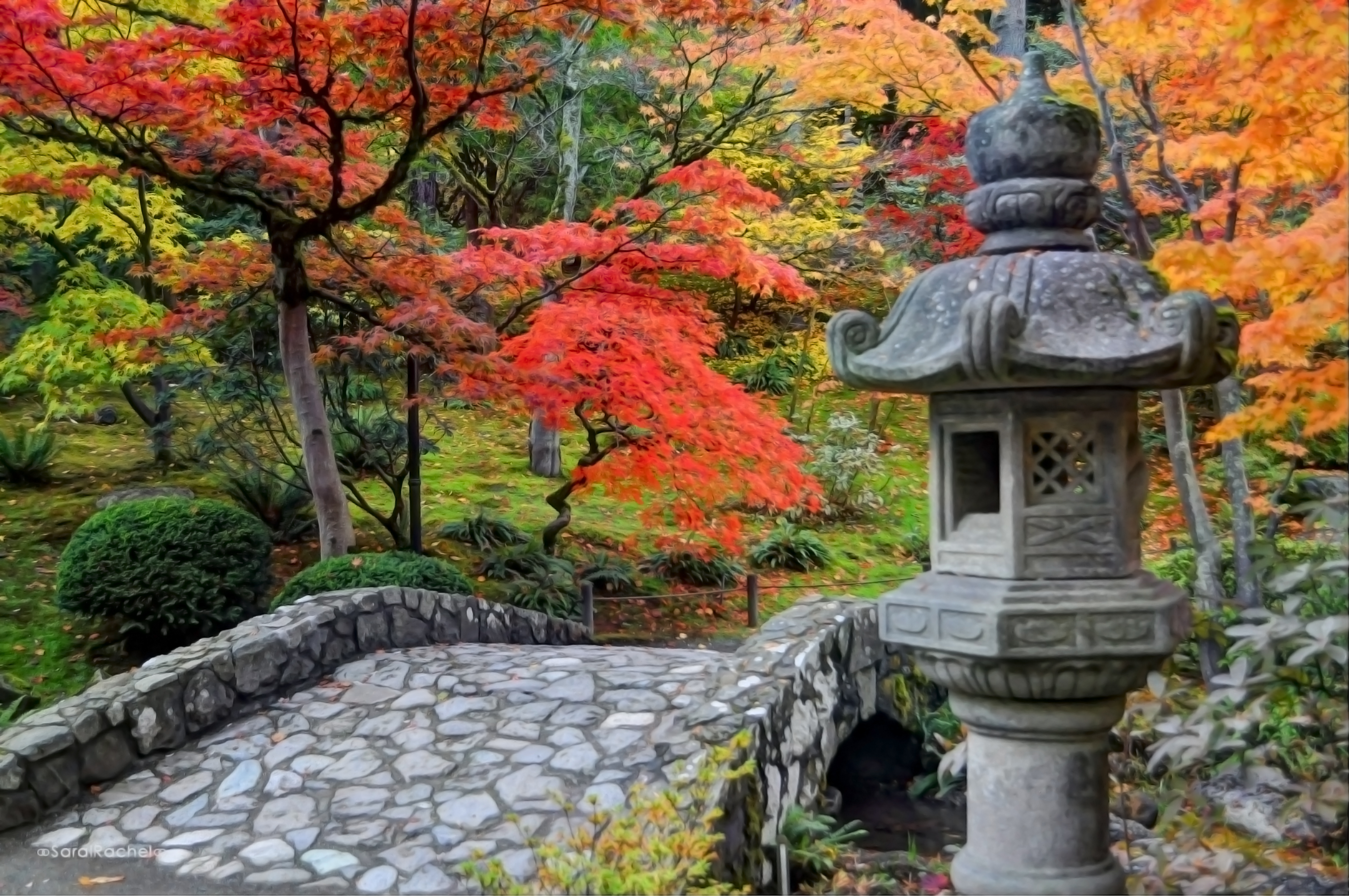
Seattle Japanese Garden

== Designation process ==
Any building, object, or site must be at least 25 years old to be considered as a landmark, considered to be a lower minimum age than those of landmark listings in other major cities. Any person or group may nominate a potential landmark by filling out a standard application, which the City Historic Preservation Officer reviews for adequacy. Once a building is nominated, any alterations to the features that were approved for nomination require a Certificate of Approval.

All correctly completed nominations are scheduled for consideration by the Board; formal consideration occurs at a public meeting. The board considers six criteria, any one of which can be sufficient to designate a landmark: association with a significant historic event; association with an historically important person: association with a significant aspect of the cultural, political, or economic heritage of the community, city, state or nation; that it "embodies the distinctive visible characteristics of an architectural style, or period, or a method of construction; that it is an outstanding work of architecture or design; or that it is an easily identifiable visual feature of its neighborhood that contributes to the distinctive quality or identity of such neighborhood or the city.

The board may approve the nomination (that is, choose to consider it) in whole or in part. A second public meeting is scheduled to occur 30 to 60 later to finalize a decision. If the board disapproves a nomination, then the property cannot be considered for nomination for five years, except at the request of the owner. If the board designates a property, a Controls and Incentives Agreement for the landmark is negotiated by the board staff with the property owner; this is also subject to board approval at a public meeting. The agreement defines features to be preserved, outlines the Certificate of Approval process for changes to those features, and may grant incentives.

The property owner can appeal to the city's hearing examiner, who may modify the board's recommendation; either the board or the property owner may appeal the hearing examiner's recommendation to the City Council. In any case, landmark status is made official only by a designating ordinance passed by the Seattle City Council.

== Restrictions and benefits ==
According to the city, the goal of the landmarks program is "to manage change, not to eliminate it." For some buildings, only the exterior is given landmark designation; for others, the interior is also included. Buildings and structures that are either landmarked in their own right or that fall within city-designated historic districts require a Certificate of Approval to make any exterior change, add or modify signs, change paint color, make changes to the public right-of-way (e.g. sidewalk displays, street lights), etc.; in some cases establishment of a different business on the premises also requires a certificate.

These restrictions stand in contrast to a listing on the National Register of Historic Places (NRHP). NRHP designation does not restrict use, treatment, transfer, or disposition of private property, nor does the NRHP list properties whose owner objects.

However, besides restrictions, Seattle Landmark status can convey certain benefits. Among these are that the Department of Planning and Development may authorize a use not otherwise permitted in a certain zone, or may waive or modify standards for open space, setbacks, parking, etc., and may modify specific requirements of the building code for landmark buildings; Downtown landmarks can transfer certain development rights more freely than other buildings; and "special valuation" can delay increased property taxes for newly rehabilitated historic buildings by up to a decade.

These are much more substantive than the benefits of NRHP listing. The latter is mostly a matter of prestige, although there are some federal tax benefits for NRHP-listed commercial buildings.

== Limitations on authority ==
The Landmarks Board does not have authority over certain buildings owned by certain other government entities. For example, the Metropolitan Tract in Downtown Seattle is owned by the University of Washington and therefore exempt from the Board's authority.
