= The Seattle Times Company =

American newspaper publisher

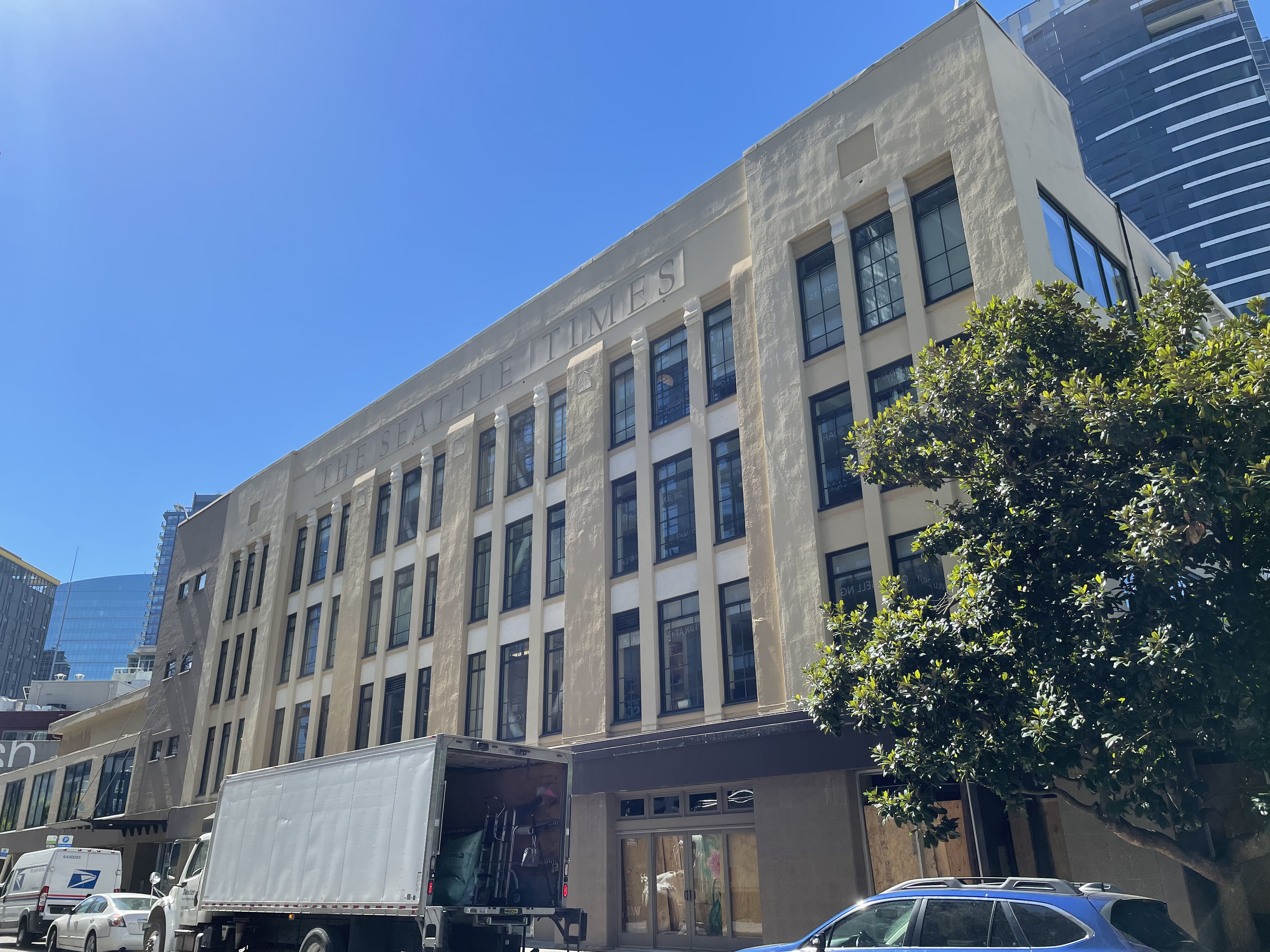
- The Seattle Times Building at 1000 Denny Way, September 2022
- Type: Private
- Industry: Newspapers
- Founded: 1896
- Headquarters: 1000 Denny Way, Seattle, Washington, U.S.
- Key people: Frank A. Blethen (CEO, Chairman); Alan Fisco (CFO, President)
- Products: The Seattle Times and several other newspapers in Washington
- Owner: Blethen family
- Website: company.seattletimes.com

The Seattle Times Company is a privately owned publisher of daily and weekly newspapers in the U.S. state of Washington. Founded in Seattle, Washington, in 1896, the company is in its fourth generation of control by the Blethen family as of 2022.

Alden J. Blethen founded the company in 1896, and kept ownership of it in his family, until his son sold a minority stake of 49.5% the company to Knight Ridder. These shares passed to McClatchy until being bought back by the family in 2024. Frank A. Blethen, Alden's great-grandson, is the chief executive officer and chairman of the company.

== Properties ==
The company owns Washington's highest-circulation daily newspaper, The Seattle Times. Elsewhere in Washington, the company owns the Yakima Herald-Republic and Walla Walla Union-Bulletin.

Maine-native schoolteacher and attorney Alden J. Blethen bought the Seattle Press-Times in 1896, renaming it the Seattle Daily Times and doubling its circulation to 7,000 six months later. When he died in 1915, the Times' circulation was 70,000.

The two smaller papers were added later. The Walla Walla Union-Bulletin was purchased in 1971, and the Yakima Herald-Republic in 1991.

=== Issaquah Press Group ===
The Times Company acquired The Issaquah Press in 1995 from Pacific Publishing Company. The newspaper also acquired the Sammamish Review, SnoValley Star, and Newcastle News later in 1995.

The Issaquah Press Group and its newspapers ceased publication in February 2017. The news website theeastside.news closed along with the papers. 12 staff were laid off.

==== The Issaquah Press ====
Founded in 1900, The Issaquah Press was the newspaper of record for Issaquah, Washington. It reached 20,000 homes in Issaquah every week.

==== Newcastle News ====
A monthly newspaper serving Newcastle, Washington, that debuted five years after the city was incorporated. The Newcastle News was mailed free to 5,000 homes in Newcastle.

==== Sammamish Review ====
Founded as a monthly in 1992, the Sammamish Review became a weekly in 2007 and was delivered free to 15,000 homes in Sammamish, Washington, every Wednesday.

==== SnoValley Star ====
The SnoValley Star's first issue was published March 6, 2008. The free-distribution weekly newspaper reached 12,400 homes and businesses in North Bend and Snoqualmie, Washington.

=== Other ===
In addition to various websites associated with its newspaper properties, The Seattle Times Company also owns Rotary Offset Press, a printing company in Kent, Washington.

=== Maine newspapers ===
For about a decade, from 1998 to mid-2009, The Seattle Times Company owned three daily newspapers and three weeklies in the state of Maine, as part of a subsidiary called Blethen Maine Newspapers. It sold these properties to private investors in 2009, who formed MaineToday Media.

Blethen Maine Newspapers was built in one acquisition, Seattle Times' purchase of all the newspapers formerly published by Guy Gannett Communications (not related to the larger Gannett chain). Guy Gannett managers said they sold to The Seattle Times Company because of shared values—both companies were fourth-generation family-owned news organizations.

"Of all the companies in the newspaper business, The Seattle Times is one most like our company in the sense of independence, of family ownership, and commitment to the community," said Guy Gannett spokesman Tim O'Meara.

Blethen Maine Newspapers' properties included the state's largest daily, the Portland Press Herald and Maine Sunday Telegram; the Kennebec Journal and the Morning Sentinel; along with their related weeklies. This purchase was estimated to have cost about $213 million.
