= The Seattle Times =

Daily newspaper published in Seattle, Washington

- The July 4, 2006 front page of The Seattle Times
- Type: Daily newspaper
- Format: Broadsheet
- Owner: The Seattle Times Company
- Founder(s): Thomas H. Dempsey; Jud R. Andrews
- Publisher: Ryan Blethen
- Editor: Michele Matassa Flores
- Founded: 1886; 140 years ago
- Language: English
- Headquarters: 1000 Denny Way; Seattle, Washington; 98109
- Circulation: 58,900 Average print circulation 108,000 Digital Subscribers
- ISSN: 0745-9696
- OCLC number: 9198928
- Website: seattletimes.com

The Seattle Times is an American daily newspaper based in Seattle, Washington. Founded in 1886, it has the largest circulation of any newspaper in the state of Washington and the Pacific Northwest region. The Seattle Times Company, which publishes the paper, has been owned by the Blethen family for five generations.

In 2006, the McClatchy Company inherited the 49.5% of voting common stock formerly held by Knight Ridder, and sold it back to the Blethens in 2024.

The Seattle Times has received 11 Pulitzer Prizes, most recently in 2015, and is widely renowned for its investigative journalism.

== History ==
On May 3, 1886, Thomas H. Dempsey and Jud R. Andrews published the first edition of The Seattle Times. Andrews soon left. In March 1887, George G. Lyon became co-owner. In February 1891, Dempsey and Lyon sold the paper to William E. Bailey, who merged it with The Press to form the Seattle Press-Times. In August 1896, Alden J. Blethen bought paper and renamed it to the Seattle Daily Times. The paper doubled its circulation to 7,000 within half a year. By the time Blethen died in 1915, circulation stood at 70,000.

The newspaper moved to the Times Square Building at 5th Avenue and Olive Way in 1915. It built a new headquarters, the Seattle Times Building, north of Denny Way in 1930. The paper moved to its current headquarters at 1000 Denny Way in 2011 and is scheduled to move to a new location in the Cascade neighborhood in 2026. In 1966, the publication changed to its current name of The Seattle Times.

The Seattle Times switched from afternoon delivery to mornings on March 6, 2000, citing that the move would help them avoid the fate of other defunct afternoon newspapers. This placed the Times in direct competition with its Joint Operating Agreement (JOA) partner, the morning Seattle Post-Intelligencer. Nine years later, the Post-Intelligencer became an online-only publication.

== Awards ==
The Seattle Times has received 11 Pulitzer Prizes, most recently in 2020 for its national reporting of the Boeing 737 MAX crashes by reporters Dominic Gates, Mike Baker, Steve Miletich and Lewis Kamb. It has an international reputation for its investigative journalism in particular. In April 2012, investigative reporters Michael Berens and Ken Armstrong won the Pulitzer Prize for Investigative Reporting for a series documenting more than 2,000 deaths caused by the state of Washington's use of methadone as a recommended painkiller in state-supported care. In April 2010, the Times staff won the Pulitzer Prize for Breaking News Reporting for its coverage, in print and online, of the shooting deaths of four police officers in a Lakewood coffee house and the 40-hour manhunt for the suspect. A tenth Pulitzer Prize was awarded in 2015 for breaking news coverage of the Oso mudslide.

Times photographer Jerry Gay won the 1975 Spot News Photography prize for "Lull in the Battle", an image of firefighters resting after fighting a house fire. In 1982, reporter Paul Henderson won the Pulitzer Prize for Investigative Reporting for his coverage of the case of Steve Titus. Titus had been wrongfully convicted of rape, and in a series of articles Henderson challenged the circumstantial evidence in the case, convincing the judge to reverse Titus' conviction.

== Controversies ==
=== 2002 headline controversy ===
In February 2002, The Seattle Times ran a subheadline "American outshines Kwan, Slutskaya in skating surprise" after Sarah Hughes won the gold medal at the 2002 Olympics. Many Asian Americans felt insulted by the headline because Michelle Kwan is also American. Asian American community leaders criticized the subheadline as perpetuating a stereotype that people of color can never be truly American. The incident echoed a similar incident that happened with an MSNBC article during the Winter games in 1998, which was reported on by Times. The newspaper's Executive Editor at the time of the controversy, Mike Fancher, issued an apology.

=== 2012 election controversy ===
On October 17, 2012, the publishers of The Seattle Times launched advertising campaigns in support of Republican gubernatorial candidate Rob McKenna and a state referendum to legalize same-sex marriage. The newspaper's management said the ads were aimed at "demonstrating how effective advertising with The Times can be." The advertisements in favor of McKenna represented an $80,000 independent expenditure, making the newspaper the third largest contributor to his campaign. More than 100 staffers signed a letter of protest sent to Seattle Times publisher Frank Blethen, calling it an "unprecedented act".

== Joint Operating Agreement ==
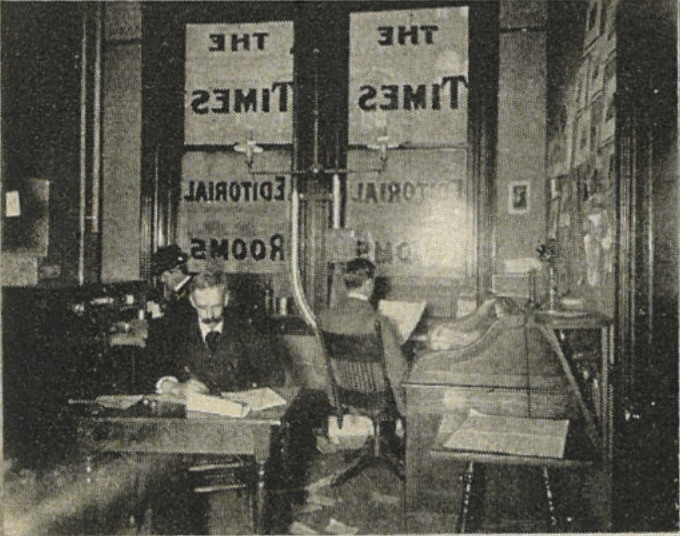
"Quarters of the news editor", one in a group of four photos in the brochure Seattle and the Orient (1900), collectively captioned "The Seattle Daily Times—Editorial Department"

From 1983 to 2009, the Times and Seattle's other major paper, the Hearst-owned Seattle Post-Intelligencer, were run under a "Joint Operating Agreement" (JOA) whereby advertising, production, marketing, and circulation were controlled by the Times for both papers. The two papers maintained their own identities with separate news and editorial departments.

The Times announced its intention to cancel the JOA in 2003, citing a clause in the JOA contract that three consecutive years of losses allowed it to pull out of the agreement. Hearst sued, arguing that a force majeure clause prevented the Times from claiming losses as reason to end the JOA when they result from extraordinary events (in this case, a seven-week strike by members of the Newspaper Guild). While a district judge ruled in Hearst's favor, the Times won on appeal, including a unanimous decision from the Washington State Supreme Court on June 30, 2005. Hearst continued to argue that the Times fabricated its loss in 2002. The two papers announced an end to their dispute on April 16, 2007.

The JOA was terminated when the Post-Intelligencer ceased publication; its final printed edition was March 17, 2009.

== Page width ==
For decades, the broadsheet page width of the Times was 13 1/2 inches (34 cm), printed from a 54-inch web, the four-page width of a roll of newsprint. Following changing industry standards, the width of the page was reduced in 2005 by 1 inch (2.5 cm), to 12 1/2 inches (32 cm), now a 50-inch web standard. In February 2009, the web size was further reduced to 46 inches, which narrowed the page by another inch to 11 1/2 inches (29 cm) in width.
