= The Concrete Herald =

Newspaper in Concrete, Washington

- The Voice of the Upper Skagit Valley
- Front page of The Concrete Herald's January 2012 edition
- Type: Monthly (Note: As of 2016, Gale Research incorrectly states the current Herald's frequency as 'weekly'. Since its revival in 2009, The Concrete Herald has been published monthly.)
- Format: Monthly Newspaper
- Founder: F.J. Wilcox
- Publisher: Jason Miller
- Editor: Jason Miller
- Founded: November 23, 1901; 124 years ago
- Ceased publication: 1991
- Relaunched: 2009
- Political alignment: Republican 1901–1919 and 1946–1953; Independent 1920–1945 and 1954–1986 (Note: The statistics for Concrete population, newspaper circulation, subscription prices, and political affiliation (until 1986, when listings of political affiliations ceased) is based on the following sources: 1913–1929: N.W. Ayer & Son's American Newspaper Annual and Directory. Philadelphia: N. W. Ayer & Son. LCCN 91012092. OCLC 4163731.; 1930–1969: N.W. Ayer & Son's Directory of Newspapers and Periodicals. Philadelphia: N. W. Ayer & Son. LCCN 01031589. OCLC 5337416.; 1970–1971: Ayer directory, newspapers, magazines and trade publications. Philadelphia: Ayer Press. ISSN 0067-2696. LCCN 81004513. OCLC 1518958.; 1972–1982: Ayer Directory of Publications. Bala Cynwyd, PA: IMS Press. ISSN 0145-1642. LCCN 73640052. OCLC 1835216.; 1983–1985: The IMS ... Ayer Directory of Publications. Fort Washington, PA: IMS Press. ISSN 0738-372X. LCCN 83643636. OCLC 9363964.; 1986: The ... IMS Directory of Publications. Fort Washington, PA: IMS Press. 1972. ISSN 0892-7715. LCCN 86640928. OCLC 13351786.; 1987–1989: Gale Directory of Publications. Farmington Hills, MI: Gale Research. ISSN 0892-1636. LCCN 87649780. OCLC 15097124.; 1990–1991: Gale Directory of Publications and Broadcast Media. Farmington Hills, MI: Gale Research. ISBN 0-910190-07-0. ISSN 1048-7972. LCCN 90649034. OCLC 20820864.)
- Language: English
- Headquarters: 137 Main St. Concrete, Washington, U.S.
- Circulation: 1,700 (as of 2016)
- Readership: Skagit County
- OCLC number: 14574917
- Website: concrete-herald.com

The Concrete Herald is a newspaper serving the town of Concrete, Washington, along with other communities in Skagit County in the United States. The newspaper has received multiple awards from the Washington Newspaper Publishers' Association, Washington State Press Club, and various other state and local organizations. The Herald's publications have initiated various public projects in the area and played a key role in fighting industrial pollution in Concrete. The publication serves as a cohesive element for the community of the Upper Skagit Valley. Published as a weekly newspaper from 1901 until its dissolution in 1991, The Concrete Herald was relaunched as a monthly publication in 2009.

The Concrete Herald was founded in Hamilton, Washington, in 1901, and moved to Concrete in 1913. After changing owners and editors several times, the newspaper entered a 40-year period of stability beginning in 1929, when it became owned and edited by Charles Dwelley. During this period, as Dwelley's editorials were picked up by other publications and quoted nationwide, the Herald's recognition and subscription base expanded beyond Concrete into the Skagit Valley. After Dwelley's retirement, The Concrete Herald was purchased by Robert and June Fader, both experienced journalists. However, after Robert's premature death in 1985 and June's retirement in late 1989, the Herald was purchased by a local businessman unconnected to the publishing business, leading to the newspaper's demise in 1991. In 2009, after raising money from the local community, local resident Jason Miller revived The Concrete Herald in both paper and electronic form.

== History ==
=== Prior to the Great Depression ===
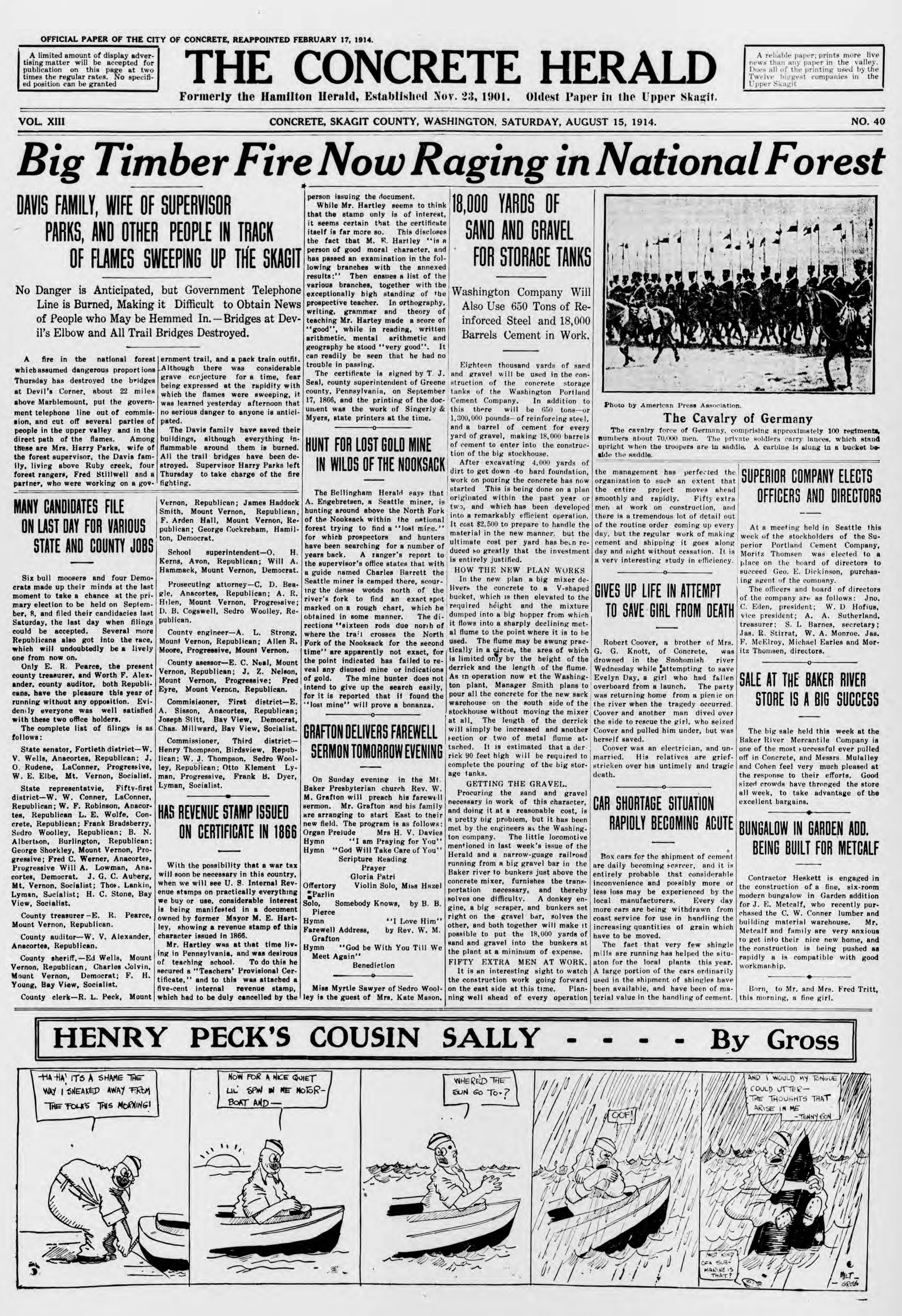
An August 1914 issue edited by Hans Bratlie

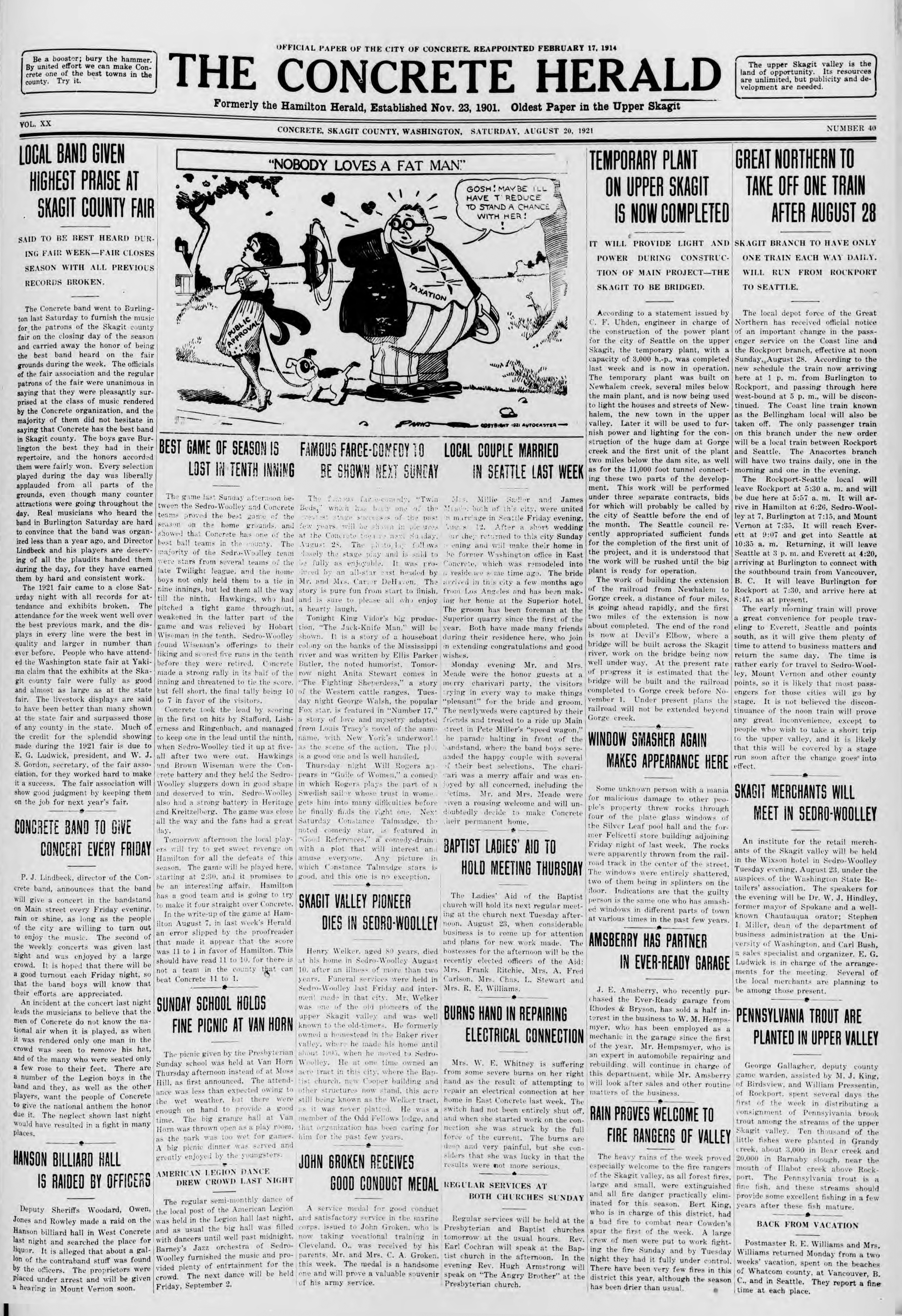
An August 1921 issue edited by G.L. Leonard

The newspaper was founded on November 23, 1901, by F.J. Wilcox, under the name The Hamilton Herald, in Hamilton, Washington. Wilcox envisioned rapid industrial development of Skagit Valley, analogous to the development of the industrial region of Pittsburgh. As of 1902, the four-page newspaper was published every Saturday and proclaimed a Republican political affiliation. The industrialization of Skagit County fell below Wilcox's expectations, and in 1904 he sold the newspaper to an immigrant from Norway, Hans J. Bratlie, who also became its editor. Under Wilcox, the paper's yearly subscription price had remained $1.00, but in 1910, Bratlie raised it to $1.50.

Bratlie operated the newspaper in Hamilton until 1913, when he moved it to Concrete, Washington and renamed it The Concrete Herald. At that time, Concrete's population was growing rapidly, boosted by two recently established Portland cement plants. Another weekly newspaper the Concrete Enterprise, had been operating in Concrete since 1908. Its owner/editor was the secretary of the Washington Newspaper Association, Louis L. Jacobin. The Enterprise also had a Republican affiliation, and its yearly subscription was $1.00.

Bratlie lowered The Concrete Herald's subscription price to $1.00 and increased its size to six pages. In turn, Jacobin re-branded his paper as the Skagit Valley Enterprise, and later as the Skagit Valley News. The relationship between the two editors deteriorated into a feud.

By the end of 1914, both editors were seeking change. Planning his retirement, Bratlie invited Ralph J. Benjamin to invest into and edit The Concrete Herald, with an option to purchase controlling stakes in the paper. On March 9, 1915, (Note: Dwelley wrote two contemporary accounts that put the date of this fire on March 13 and February 16, but according to 1915 sources, the fire occurred on March 9, as reported by The Concrete Herald itself.) however, the newspaper's three-story wooden building and most of its equipment were destroyed by a fire, and Benjamin had to abandon the paper, losing his investment. Bratlie's loss amounted from $7,000 to $9,000 (from $184,000 to $237,000 in 2021 dollars (Note: The approximate value converted to 2021 dollars, based on a standard adjustment of the 1915 dollar value using the Consumer Price Index as calculated by United States Department of Labor.)), according to different accounts, but he salvaged some supplies and one Linotype machine that survived the fire, and continued publishing. He installed W.J.S. Gordon, and later M.G. Flower, as temporary editors.

Meanwhile, the relationship between the competing editors—Jacobin and Bratlie's failed replacement, Benjamin—did not go well. Jacobin reportedly gloated about the fire victims. In turn, Benjamin authored a series of critical editorials attacking both cement plants of Concrete for dust pollution, which led to a loss of advertising revenue for his paper. As a result, in September 1916, Benjamin sold his rebranded Skagit Valley News to Mrs. N.I. Wolbert and purchased interest in another Washington local paper the Wilkeson Record, instead. The strain of World War I, as well as local competition, eventually led to the indefinite suspension of the Skagit Valley News, making the Herald the only newspaper in Concrete by August 1918.

Bratlie continued searching for his replacement, and by May 1917 he had engaged a well-known Everett printer, Jim G. Webster, to work on The Concrete Herald. In January 1918, Webster purchased the controlling share of the newspaper. The editor and co-owner was G.L. Leonard, an attorney by training and the elected school superintendent of Concrete. Bratlie remained a minority shareholder.

With its new leadership, the newspaper changed its political affiliation to Independent and increased its subscription to $1.50. Its paid circulation, however, fell sharply, from 870 subscribers in Bratlie's years to 330 in 1920. In 1922, circulation rebounded slightly to 462, and Webster sold his share in the newspaper to A.J. Collins. Bratlie retained his minority share and Leonard continued as editor.

Collins remained the owner of The Concrete Herald until his premature death during a fire in Concrete hotel. In July 1928, Leonard purchased Collins' share of the newspaper from his widow and became the sole owner of The Concrete Herald, but by 1929, the newspaper was in trouble and could not service mortgages on its building and equipment.

=== Dwelley's years ===
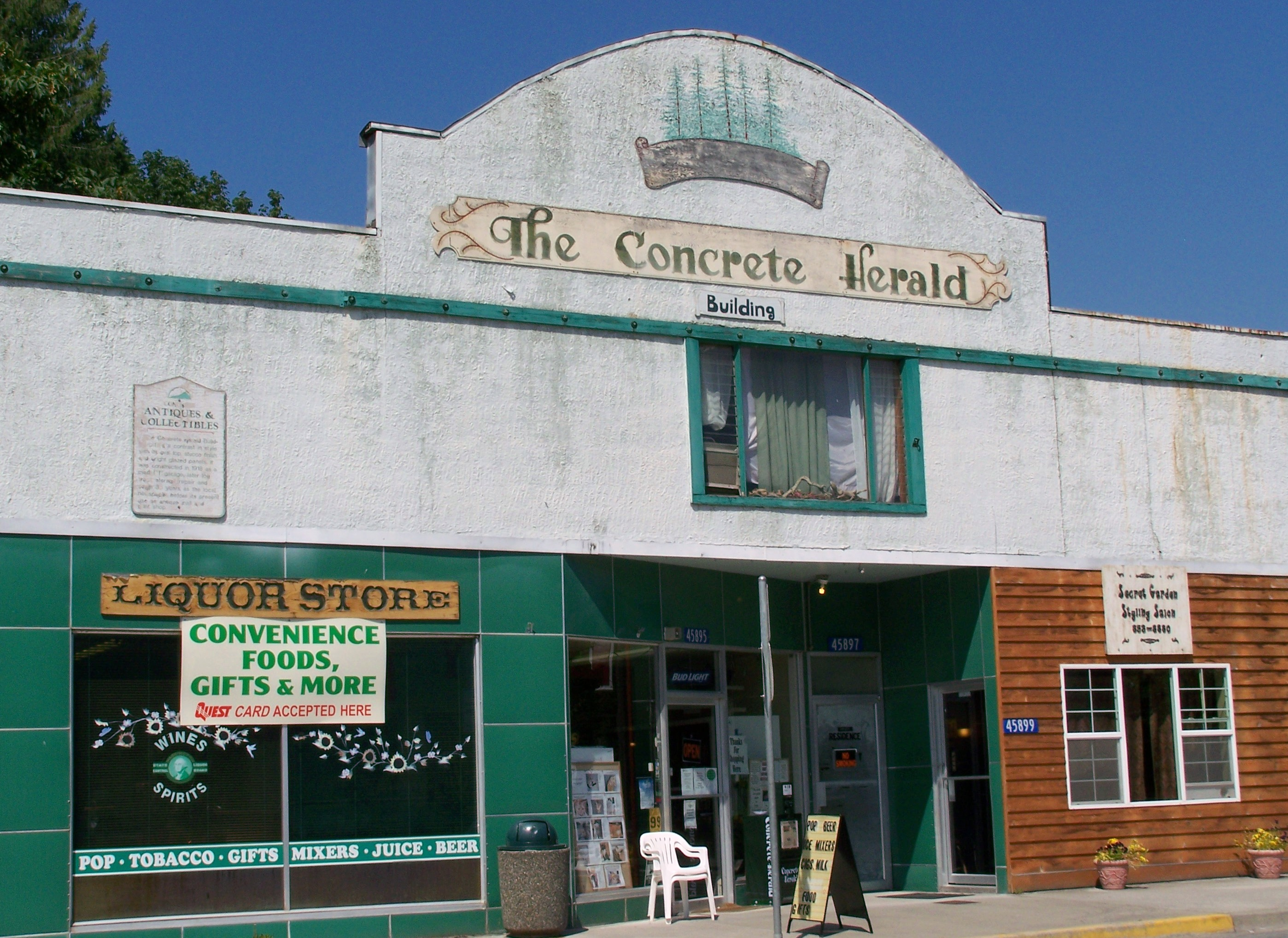
The Concrete Herald building on Main street in Concrete, WA, occupied by local stores. It still carries the embellishments and distinctive green color Dwelley applied in the 1950s.

The Sedro-Woolley Publishing Company took control of The Concrete Herald by purchasing its debts in September 1929. Frank Evans, owner of the Sedro-Woolley Publishing Company and publisher of The Courier Times of Sedro-Woolley, was a member of the Service Committee of the Washington Press Association. He aspired to become a newspaper "magnate" acquire Washington newspapers.

A month before Black Tuesday's collapse of the stock exchange, Evans sent his assistant, Charles Dwelley, to Concrete to edit the newly acquired newspaper. The youngest editor in Washington State at the time,21-year-old Dwelley worked and lived with his pregnant wife in a wooden newspaper building and operated two 19th century Linotype machines for 9-point and 12-point fonts, so all headings needed to be set by hand. In later years, Dwelley stated that the reason Evans has chosen him for the job was that he was the only person in the Sedro-Woolley office who could operate both machines.

In March 1930, Evans and Dwelley jointly incorporated the newspaper. In 1935, during The Great Depression, Dwelley took a mortgage on Evan's share and became the sole owner of Herald. He took another mortgage on the building of a Ford garage on Main Street Concrete that had failed, and gradually renovated it into the new Concrete Herald office and print shop, with an apartment for his family on the second floor. By 1940, Dwelley had paid both mortgages.

Noted as one of very few "remarkable exceptions" to massive newspaper failures in the turbulent years of the Depression and World War II, The Concrete Herald survived under Dwelley and gradually became "one of the finest edited newspapers in the state." The Herald's subscription base rose to include all of upper Skagit Valley, from Lyman in the west to Newhalem in the northeast. Dwelley's editorials were cited on the radio throughout the country, reprinted in nationwide publications such as Reader's Digest and The New York Times, and referred to among professional journalists as "Dwellisms." The newspaper and Dwelley personally received multiple awards and recognitions on state and national levels.

All three of Dwelley's spouses assisted with the Herald's publication, and Dwelley's son, Art, worked as an apprentice at the Herald's shop until September 1951. By this time, the Herald's operation, one of the smallest of its kind, needed three people, and Miriam McGuire replaced Art as an assistant. A typical issue was six or eight pages. Type was set from Tuesday to Thursday, and on Thursdays, newly printed newspapers were folded by hand. The newspaper suspended its publication once, from Nov 2, 1944 to May 31, 1945, during the period Dwelley served in the US Navy during World War II.

==== Protecting public interest ====
Dwelley strongly believed that a newspaper's editor should have and voice his opinion, and his editorials often confronted local problems. For 40 years, Dwelley fought the Superior Portland Cement Company over the dust pollution it created in Concrete. Dwelley claimed that in 1929 and 1930, he withstood pressure from executives of Superior Portland Cement, who offered him "help" with editing the paper and insisted that his editorials should be cleared with the company's office prior to publication. Open confrontation concerning the dust pollution between Superior Portland Cement and the editor of Herald's competitor in Concrete The Skagit Valley News, was a contributing factor in the demise of that newspaper in 1916. Eventually, a community group led by Dwelley successfully involved Senator Lowell Peterson in the issue, conducted a dust emission study that proved pollution levels more than 10 times over acceptable levels, and pushed for the creation of the Northwest Air Pollution Authority. Five days after the first meeting of the State Air Pollution Control Board, the Concrete plant operator decided to completely close the plant.

In 1956, The Concrete Herald was sued for libel by Jacob Koops, a police judge of the city of Lyman, Washington, in connection to Dwelley's editorial of July 17, 1955. The article alleged financial mishandling of the traffic fines by officials of Lyman for personal gain. At that time, a Washington State Supreme Court decision imposed serious limitations on criticism in newspaper columns. The affair dragged on for three years, making its way to court in June 1958. The Herald supplied witnesses who confirmed its claims, and the court acquitted the paper.

=== Post-Dwelley years ===
Dwelley retired and sold The Concrete Herald in September 1970, just past the 40-year anniversary of his editorship. The new owners of the newspaper, Robert and June Fader had experience in the newspaper business. For over 20 years, Robert Fader worked in and later co-owned The Anacortes American, a local newspaper published in Anacortes. June had previously worked as an assistant editor of The Skagit Valley Herald in Mount Vernon, and later as the news editor of The Whidbey News-Times of Oak Harbor.

June became The Concrete Herald's editor. Robert was involved with Washington Newspaper Publisher's Association, and in August 1976, he was elected its treasurer. In 1985, June Fader stepped down, and Anne Bussiere was hired as Herald's editor. Dwelley praised Bussiere's editorials in their personal correspondence.

Even though the population of Concrete continued to decline, the Herald's subscription base continued to rise after Dwelley's retirement, increasing by 48% from 1970 to 1988. Robert Fader died of cancer in October 1985, at the age of 61. On December 31, 1989, June retired, selling The Concrete Herald to Margaret Walter from Mount Vernon and Mae Falavolito, a Concrete resident who had assisted with editing the newspaper since 1986. As of 1990, Mae Falavolito was listed as the single owner of the newspaper. June Fader's chief consideration was to leave the newspaper in the hands of local residents, but the local community was reportedly "shocked" when they learned that John Falavolito, an opportunistic businessman with no background in communications, was the actual owner.

The newspaper started to fail, and the new owners put it up for sale in the beginning of 1991. After several months of unsuccessful attempts to find a new buyer, The Concrete Herald stopped publication on September 5, 1991. Later that year, The Skagit Argus hired Bussiere and attempted to substitute The Concrete Herald with a special Concrete Argus edition, but the project was unsuccessful.

Historical distribution statistics and yearly subscription prices from Herald's move to Concrete in 1913 to 1991.
● Number of paid subscriptions ● Population of Concrete	● Yearly subscription price (YSP) ● YSP in 2016 dollars (Note: Based on a standard adjustment using Consumer Price Index as calculated by the United States Department of Labor.)

=== Historical distribution ===
Until 1991, the Herald's subscription base covered a smaller area and was limited to the upper Skagit Valley, with dedicated sections on Birdsview, Marblemount, Newhalem, Rockport, and Van Horn. The Concrete Heritage Museum maintains a digital archive of the newspaper that is sponsored by Puget Sound Energy. However, many early issues of the newspaper were lost in a fire in 1915.

== Awards ==
Year	Presenter	Award category	Place	Contributor recognized	Reference
1949	Washington State Press Club	Best Editorial	First	Charles Dwelley	
1950	Washington State Press Club	Best Editorial	First	Charles Dwelley	
1951	National Newspaper Association	Best Issue			
1952	Ladies' Home Journal	Best Editorial	Top 4	Charles Dwelley	
1952	Washington State Press Club	Distinguished Reporting	Second		
1958	Washington State Press Club	Excellence in Community Service	First		
1959	Washington Newspaper Publishers' Association	General excellence	Second		
1970	Newspaper Leadership Contest		First		
1972	Sigma Delta Chi	Special Interest Column	First	Roy Olson	
1974	Washington State Press Club	Best Editorial	Third	June Fader	

== The Herald's revival ==
In 2009, Concrete resident Jason Miller revived the newspaper in both paper and electronic formats. Miller raised over $10,000 from over 150 businesses and individuals in the community to fund the revival. Since 2009, The Concrete Herald has been published as a monthly tabloid. The successful resurrection of the paper version in the digital age came as a surprise for the publishing industry. The revival has reportedly "rejuvenated" Concrete, and The Concrete Herald continues to serve as a cohesive element for the community of the upper Skagit Valley. The Skagit County Pioneer Association awarded Miller the Pioneer Spirit Award in 2024 for his work at the paper and for time served on the Concrete city council and as mayor. After 15 years in Concrete, Miller announced plans to move and sell the paper in 2025 for an asking price of $108,000.

== Distribution ==
As of 2022, the distribution of the paper edition of Concrete Herald covers the Skagit County, Whatcom County, and Snohomish County cities, towns, and communities of Anacortes, Arlington, Bellingham, Birdsview, Burlington, Clear Lake, Concrete, Conway, Darrington, Day Creek, Deming, Glacier, Hamilton, La Conner, Lyman, Maple Falls, Marblemount, Newhalem, Rockport, Mount Vernon, and Sedro-Woolley, with a total circulation of 5,000 paper copies. The newspaper maintains dedicated sections covering local news from Darrington, Clear Lake, Concrete, Hamilton, Lyman, Marblemount, Newhalem, Rockport, and Sedro-Woolley.

== Literature cited ==
- "CPI Inflation Calculator", Bureau of Labor Statistics, Washington: United States Department of Labor
- American newspaper directory (PDF), New York: G. P. Rowell & Co., 1902, ISSN 0145-1669, LCCN 2003216001, OCLC 7550153
- N. W. Ayer & Son's American newspaper annual, Philadelphia: N. W. Ayer & Son, 1905, LCCN sn91012091, OCLC 6039147
- Rowell's American newspaper directory (PDF), New York: Printers' Ink Pub. Co., 1909, ISSN 0145-1669, LCCN 02001180, OCLC 8007428
- N. W. Ayer & Son's American newspaper annual and directory, Philadelphia: N. W. Ayer & Son, 1910, LCCN sn91012092, OCLC 4163731
- N. W. Ayer & Son's American newspaper annual and directory, Philadelphia: N. W. Ayer & Son, 1912, LCCN sn91012092, OCLC 4163731
- N. W. Ayer & Son's American newspaper annual and directory, Philadelphia: N. W. Ayer & Son, 1913, LCCN sn91012092, OCLC 4163731
- "Leonard Elected" (PDF), Seattle Star, vol. 16, no. 38, Seattle: E. W. Scripps, p. 2, March 9, 1914, ISSN 2159-5577, LCCN sn87093407, OCLC 17285351
- N. W. Ayer & Son's American newspaper annual and directory, Philadelphia: N. W. Ayer & Son, 1915, LCCN sn91012092, OCLC 4163731
- "Paper Loses Home" (PDF), Seattle Star, vol. 18, no. 12, Seattle: E. W. Scripps, p. 3, March 10, 1915, ISSN 2159-5577, LCCN sn87093407, OCLC 17285351
- "Fire Destroys Herald Building And Entire Equipment — Dr. Van Buskirk And W.R. Smith Losers In Flames", The Concrete Herald, vol. 14, no. 18, Concrete: N. J. Brattie, p. 1, March 13, 1915, OCLC 14574917
- Kane, Frank, ed. (October 1, 1915), "More or Less News", Washington Newspaper, vol. 1, Seattle: University of Washington, LCCN ca20000342, OCLC 2486924
- Kane, Frank, ed. (January 1, 1916), "More or Less News", Washington Newspaper, vol. 1, no. 4, Seattle: University of Washington, pp. 98–111, LCCN ca20000342, OCLC 2486924
- N. W. Ayer & Son's American newspaper annual and directory, Philadelphia: N. W. Ayer & Son, 1916, LCCN sn91012092, OCLC 4163731
- Kane, Frank, ed. (February 1, 1916), "More or Less News", Washington Newspaper, vol. 1, no. 5, Seattle: University of Washington, pp. 130–143, LCCN ca20000342, OCLC 2486924
- Kane, Frank, ed. (May 1, 1916), "More or Less News", Washington Newspaper, vol. 1, no. 8, Seattle: University of Washington, pp. 220–231, LCCN ca20000342, OCLC 2486924
- Kane, Frank, ed. (October 1, 1916), "More or Less News", Washington Newspaper, vol. 2, no. 1, Seattle: University of Washington, pp. 17–32, LCCN ca20000342, OCLC 2486924
- N. W. Ayer & Son's American newspaper annual and directory, Philadelphia: N. W. Ayer & Son, 1917, LCCN sn91012092, OCLC 4163731
- Kane, Frank, ed. (February 1, 1917), "More or Less News", Washington Newspaper, vol. 2, no. 5, Seattle: University of Washington, pp. 153–160, LCCN ca20000342, OCLC 2486924
- Kane, Frank, ed. (May 1, 1917), "More or Less News", Washington Newspaper, vol. 2, no. 8, Seattle: University of Washington, pp. 248–256, LCCN ca20000342, OCLC 2486924
- "James G. Webster ..." (PDF), The Labor Journal, vol. XXVI, no. 3, Everett: Everett Trade Council, p. 1, May 18, 1917, ISSN 2328-4013, LCCN sn88085620, OCLC 18036796
- "James G. Webster ..." (PDF), The Labor Journal, vol. XXVI, no. 5, Everett: Everett Trade Council, p. 1, June 1, 1917, ISSN 2328-4013, LCCN sn88085620, OCLC 18036796
- N. W. Ayer & Son's American newspaper annual and directory, Philadelphia: N. W. Ayer & Son, 1918, LCCN sn91012092, OCLC 4163731
- "The Concrete Herald" (PDF), The Labor Journal, vol. XXVI, no. 365, Everett: Everett Trade Council, p. 1, January 25, 1918, ISSN 2328-4013, LCCN sn88085620, OCLC 18036796
- Kane, Frank, ed. (February 1, 1918), "More or Less News", Washington Newspaper, vol. 3, no. 5, Seattle: University of Washington, pp. 150–160, LCCN ca20000342, OCLC 2486924
- Kane, Frank, ed. (August 1, 1918), "More or Less News", Washington Newspaper, vol. 3, no. 11, Seattle: University of Washington, pp. 344–352, LCCN ca20000342, OCLC 2486924
- Kane, Frank, ed. (October 1, 1918), "More or Less News", Washington Newspaper, vol. 4, no. 1, Seattle: University of Washington, pp. 20–32, LCCN ca20000342, OCLC 2486924
- "James G. Webster ..." (PDF), The Labor Journal, vol. XXVIII, no. 4, Everett: Everett Trade Council, p. 1, May 23, 1919, ISSN 2328-4013, LCCN sn88085620, OCLC 18036796
- N. W. Ayer & Son's American newspaper annual and directory, Philadelphia: N. W. Ayer & Son, 1920, LCCN sn91012092, OCLC 4163731
- "Directory of Washington Newspapers", Washington Newspaper, vol. 5, no. 5, Seattle: University of Washington, pp. 93–96, May 1, 1920, LCCN ca20000342, OCLC 2486924
- "Directory of Washington Newspapers", Washington Newspaper, vol. 6, no. 8, Seattle: University of Washington, pp. 239–248, May 1, 1921, LCCN ca20000342, OCLC 2486924
- N. W. Ayer & Son's American newspaper annual and directory, Philadelphia: N. W. Ayer & Son, 1922, LCCN sn91012092, OCLC 4163731
- Kane, Frank, ed. (August 1, 1922), "More or Less News", Washington Newspaper, vol. 7, no. 11, Seattle: University of Washington, pp. 345–352, LCCN ca20000342, OCLC 2486924
- "Directory of Washington Newspapers", Washington Newspaper, vol. 7, no. 12, Seattle: University of Washington, pp. 368–384, September 1, 1922, LCCN ca20000342, OCLC 2486924
- "G. L. Leonard ...", Washington Newspaper, vol. 13, no. 10, Seattle: University of Washington, July 1, 1928, LCCN ca20000342, OCLC 2486924
- "Directory of Washington Newspapers", Washington Newspaper, vol. 14, no. 4, Seattle: University of Washington, pp. 1–16, January 1, 1929, LCCN ca20000342, OCLC 2486924
- "Frank S. Evans ...", Washington Newspaper, vol. 14, no. 7, Seattle: University of Washington, April 1, 1929, LCCN ca20000342, OCLC 2486924
- "President Names Committee", Washington Newspaper, vol. 14, no. 11, Seattle: University of Washington, August 1, 1929, LCCN ca20000342, OCLC 2486924
- "Charley Dwelley", Washington Newspaper, vol. 15, no. 1, Seattle: University of Washington, October 1, 1929, LCCN ca20000342, OCLC 2486924
- "Incorporations", Seattle Times, Seattle: Frank A. Blethen, p. 28, March 16, 1930, ISSN 0745-9696, LCCN sn83009191, OCLC 9198928
- "New Building for Concrete", Washington Newspaper, vol. 15, no. 7, Seattle: University of Washington, April 1, 1930, LCCN ca20000342, OCLC 2486924
- "Frank Evans ...", Washington Newspaper, vol. 15, no. 10, Seattle: University of Washington, July 1, 1930, LCCN ca20000342, OCLC 2486924
- "Directory of Washington Newspapers", Washington Newspaper, vol. 16, no. 4, Seattle: University of Washington, January 1, 1931, LCCN ca20000342, OCLC 2486924
- "Concrete Herald Closes Doors", Washington Newspaper, vol. 30, no. 3, Seattle: University of Washington, p. 3, December 1, 1944, LCCN ca20000342, OCLC 2486924
- "Dwelley Again Dwells in Peace; Returns After 21 Months, Navy", Washington Newspaper, vol. 31, no. 4, Seattle: University of Washington, p. 2, January 1, 1946, LCCN ca20000342, OCLC 2486924
- "30 News Writers Get Press Club Awards", Seattle Times, Seattle: Frank A. Blethen, p. 38, April 1, 1949, ISSN 0745-9696, LCCN sn83009191, OCLC 9198928
- "Dwelley Says Short Editorials Mean Beefsteak in the Dinner Pot", Washington Newspaper, vol. 35, no. 8, Seattle: University of Washington, pp. 1–10, May 1, 1950, LCCN ca20000342, OCLC 2486924
- "Newspaper Writers Win Awards", Seattle Times, Seattle: Frank A. Blethen, p. 13, May 18, 1951, ISSN 0745-9696, LCCN sn83009191, OCLC 9198928
- "Concrete Herald Commemorates Fiftieth Anniversary This Year", Washington Newspaper, vol. 36, no. 9, Seattle: University of Washington, p. 6, June 1, 1951, LCCN ca20000342, OCLC 2486924
- "Concrete", Washington Newspaper, vol. 37, no. 1, Seattle: University of Washington, pp. 4, 14, October 1, 1951, LCCN ca20000342, OCLC 2486924
- "Concrete Editor Gets Newspaper Recognition", Washington Newspaper, vol. 37, no. 4, Seattle: University of Washington, p. 4, January 1, 1952, LCCN ca20000342, OCLC 2486924
- "Winners in State Press Club Writing Contest", Washington Newspaper, vol. 37, no. 9, Seattle: University of Washington, p. 1, June 1, 1952, LCCN ca20000342, OCLC 2486924
- "Concrete Herald Spruces Up Shop; Spring Fever?", Washington Newspaper, vol. 38, no. 6, Seattle: University of Washington, p. 9, March 1, 1953, LCCN ca20000342, OCLC 2486924
- "Libel Becoming Greater Problem", Washington Newspaper, vol. 40, no. 10, Seattle: University of Washington, p. 4, July 1, 1955, LCCN ca20000342, OCLC 2486924
- "Charles Dwelley Discusses Weekly Paper's Role In Editorial Leadership In Community", Washington Newspaper, vol. 41, no. 5, Seattle: University of Washington, p. 11, February 1, 1956, LCCN ca20000342, OCLC 2486924
- "Suit Filed Against Concrete Herald", Washington Newspaper, vol. 42, no. 4, Seattle: University of Washington, p. 3, January 1, 1957, LCCN ca20000342, OCLC 2486924
- "Charles Dwelley Elected WNPA President; Gay, Randich, Stoffel New WNPA Officers", Washington Newspaper, vol. 42, no. 11, Seattle: University of Washington, p. 3, August 1, 1957, LCCN ca20000342, OCLC 2486924
- "Chuck Dwelley Gives Lowdown On His Life And Hard Times as Concrete Herald Publisher", Washington Newspaper, vol. 43, no. 2, Seattle: University of Washington, pp. 4, 12, November 1, 1957, LCCN ca20000342, OCLC 2486924
- "Concrete Paper Wins Libel Case", Seattle Times, Seattle: Frank A. Blethen, p. 2, June 12, 1958, ISSN 0745-9696, LCCN sn83009191, OCLC 9198928
- "Dwelley victor in $50,000 libel suit", Washington Newspaper, vol. 43, no. 10, Seattle: University of Washington, p. 3, July 1, 1958, LCCN ca20000342, OCLC 2486924
- "We Proudly Present ... The Winnahs!", Washington Newspaper, vol. 44, no. 1, Seattle: University of Washington, p. 9, October 1, 1958, LCCN ca20000342, OCLC 2486924
- "Pierce County Father-Son Team Wins State Newspaper Sweepstake Award", Seattle Times, Seattle: Frank A. Blethen, pp. D35, September 13, 1959, ISSN 0745-9696, LCCN sn83009191, OCLC 9198928
- "Trade Wind", Washington Newspaper, vol. 46, no. 4, Seattle: University of Washington, p. 5, January 1, 1961, LCCN ca20000342, OCLC 2486924
- "Town Promised Pollution Statement", Seattle Times, Seattle: Frank A. Blethen, p. 26, November 4, 1967, ISSN 0745-9696, LCCN sn83009191, OCLC 9198928
- "Lone Star Plans Closure at Concrete", Seattle Times, Seattle: Frank A. Blethen, p. 47, November 9, 1967, ISSN 0745-9696, LCCN sn83009191, OCLC 9198928
- Ayer directory, newspapers, magazines and trade publications, Philadelphia: Ayer Press, 1970, ISSN 0067-2696, LCCN sn81004513, OCLC 1518958
- "No More 'Native Gray'", Seattle Times, Seattle: Frank A. Blethen, p. 193, February 22, 1970, ISSN 0745-9696, LCCN sn83009191, OCLC 9198928
- "Congratulations", Washington Newspaper, vol. 55, no. 8, Seattle: University of Washington, p. 2, May 1, 1970, LCCN ca20000342, OCLC 2486924
- "Trade Wind", Washington Newspaper, vol. 55, no. 12, Seattle: University of Washington, p. 32, September 1, 1970, LCCN ca20000342, OCLC 2486924
- "Faders New Publishers of Concrete Herald", Washington Newspaper, vol. 56, no. 1, Seattle: University of Washington, p. 1, October 1, 1970, LCCN ca20000342, OCLC 2486924
- "Trade Wind", Washington Newspaper, vol. 56, no. 3, Seattle: University of Washington, p. 10, December 1, 1970, LCCN ca20000342, OCLC 2486924
- "Winners collect SDX awards", Washington Newspaper, vol. 57, no. 8, Seattle: University of Washington, p. 6, May 1, 1972, LCCN ca20000342, OCLC 2486924
- "News/Design", Washington Newspaper, vol. 60, no. 1, Seattle: University of Washington, p. 9, October 1, 1974, LCCN ca20000342, OCLC 2486924
- "Officer election — Meet the candidates", Washington Newspaper, vol. 61, no. 10, Seattle: University of Washington, p. 4, July 1, 1976, LCCN ca20000342, OCLC 2486924
- "Membership vote — Flint, Lewis, Leary, Fader win election", Washington Newspaper, vol. 61, no. 11, Seattle: University of Washington, p. 1, August 1, 1976, LCCN ca20000342, OCLC 2486924
- The IMS directory of publications (118 ed.), Fort Washington: IMS Press, 1986, ISBN 0910190372, ISSN 0892-7715, LCCN 86640928, OCLC 13351786
- Gale Directory of Publications, vol. 1 (119 ed.), Farmington Hills: Gale Research, 1988, ISSN 0892-1636, LCCN 87649780, OCLC 15097124
- "New owners in new year at Concrete", Washington Newspaper, vol. 74, no. 4, Seattle: University of Washington, p. 3, January 1, 1989, LCCN ca20000342, OCLC 2486924
- Gale directory of publications and broadcast media, vol. 2 (122 ed.), Farmington Hills: Gale Research, 1990, ISSN 1048-7972, LCCN 90649034, OCLC 20820864
- Palmer, Gayle L., ed. (April 1, 1991), Washington State union list of newspapers on microfilm, Olympia: Washington State Library, LCCN 93100496, OCLC 24170966
- "Concrete Herald stops publication", Washington Newspaper, vol. 77, no. 1, Seattle: University of Washington, p. 2, October 1, 1991, LCCN ca20000342, OCLC 2486924
- "Argus publishes Concrete edition", Washington Newspaper, vol. 77, no. 2, Seattle: University of Washington, p. 4, December 1, 1991, LCCN ca20000342, OCLC 2486924
- "June H. (Bell) Fader (1926—2008)", Skagit Valley Herald, Mount Vernon: Skagit Valley Publishing Co., October 4, 2008, ISSN 1071-197X, OCLC 61311930
- Miller, Jason K., ed. (May 1, 2009), "It's baaack... Concrete Herald resumes publishing" (PDF), The Concrete Herald, vol. 92, no. 1, Concrete: Jason K. Miller, pp. 1–2, OCLC 14574917
- "Concrete Herald in print; fundraiser helps", Washington Newspaper, vol. 95, no. 1, Seattle: University of Washington, p. 4, January 1, 2010, LCCN ca20000342, OCLC 2486924
- Schummer, Paul; Batten, Donna, eds. (2016), Gale directory of publications and broadcast media, Gale Directory of Publications and Broadcast Media, vol. 2 (152 ed.), Farmington Hills: Gale Research, ISBN 978-1414488042, ISSN 1048-7972, LCCN 90649034, OCLC 20820864
- Crawford, Malik; Church, Jonathan; Akin, Bradley, eds. (June 1, 2016), "Historical Consumer Price Index for All Urban Consumers (CPI-U): U. S. city average, all items-Continued", CPI Detailed Report, Washington: Bureau of Labor Statistics, pp. 70–73, OCLC 124075106
- Boggs, Gail (2014), "Concrete Herald Archives", concreteheritagemuseum.org, Concrete Heritage Museum: Concrete Heritage Museum
- Bourasaw, Noel V. (December 17, 2005), Bourasaw, Noel V. (ed.), "Charles M. Dwelley, Concrete publisher for 40 years, and his historic Skagit family", Skagit River Journal of History and Folklore, La Conner: Skagit County Historical Society, OCLC 693269331
- Burkhalter, Aaron (April 15, 2012), "A Sense of Place: Moving past the past", Skagit Valley Herald, Mount Vernon: Skagit Valley Publishing Co., p. 1, ISSN 1071-197X, OCLC 61311930
- Dwelley, Charles (1980), So They Called The Town 'Concrete': A Story of Life and Times in Unique Concrete, Washington, Concrete: The Concrete Herald, ASIN B007FD9DAI, LCCN 80125676, OCLC 6709984
- Kennedy, Fred W. (February 1, 1951), "WNPA Membership Shows Tremendous Turnover During Past Twenty Years", Washington Newspaper, vol. 36, no. 5–7, Seattle: University of Washington, pp. 1, 8, 10–11, LCCN ca20000342, OCLC 2486924
- Lacitis, Erik (February 7, 2009), "Town of Concrete embraces plans to restart local paper", Seattle Times, Seattle: Frank A. Blethen, ISSN 0745-9696, LCCN sn83009191, OCLC 9198928
- Miller, Jason K. (2016), "Subscribe to Concrete Herald", concrete-herald.com, Concrete: The Concrete Herald, OCLC 14574917
- Muller, Judy (2011), Emus Loose in Egnar: Big Stories from Small Towns, Lincoln: University of Nebraska Press, LCCN 2010051804, OCLC 679936550
- Pollack, Doris (October 1, 2009), Miller, Jason K. (ed.), "Charles Muth Dwelley: A Concrete publishing icon" (PDF), The Concrete Herald, vol. 92, no. 6, Concrete: Jason K. Miller, p. 5, OCLC 14574917
- Schwartz, Ralph (August 6, 2009), "Energetic town councilman revives the Concrete Herald", Skagit Valley Herald, Mount Vernon: Skagit Valley Publishing Co., ISSN 1071-197X, OCLC 61311930
- Sorensen, Eric (July 1, 2001), "Concrete Conclusion – The forces of millennia converged to create a town, then destroy it", Seattle Times, Seattle: Frank A. Blethen, pp. D10, ISSN 0745-9696, LCCN sn83009191, OCLC 9198928
- Steuteville, Robert (January 1, 2010), "Jason Miller former editor of New Towns succeeded in raising 10000 to resurrect the Concrete Herald", Better Cities & Towns, Ithaca: New Urban Publications, Inc., p. 20, ISSN 2165-476X, LCCN 2012202608, OCLC 773050478, archived from the original on November 4, 2016
- White, Franny (August 20, 2007), "Upriver communities celebrate Cascade Days", Skagit Valley Herald, Mount Vernon: Skagit Valley Publishing Co., ISSN 1071-197X, OCLC 61311930
- Williams, Anne (October 1, 1993), "Charles M. 'Chuck' Dwelley", Skagit Valley Herald, Mount Vernon: Skagit Valley Publishing Co., ISSN 1071-197X, OCLC 61311930
