= Charles Dwelley =

American journalist

Charles Muth Dwelley
- Born: March 8, 1908; Mount Vernon, Washington
- Died: September 30, 1993 (aged 85); Tenino, Washington
- Resting place: Pleasant Ridge Cemetery, La Conner, Washington; 48.3918°N 122.4478°W
- Other name: Chuck Dwelley
- Occupation: The editor of The Concrete Herald
- Years active: 1929–1970
- Predecessor: G.L. Leonard
- Successor: June Fader
- Spouse: Helen Lyle (Grubb) Dwelley · Alice May (Hurn) Dwelley · Helen Lenore (Pemberton) Dwelley
- Children: Arthur (Art) Gilbert Dwelley (1930–2000)
- Parents: Charles Lemuel Dwelley (father); Mary Elizabeth Muth Dwelley (mother)

Signature
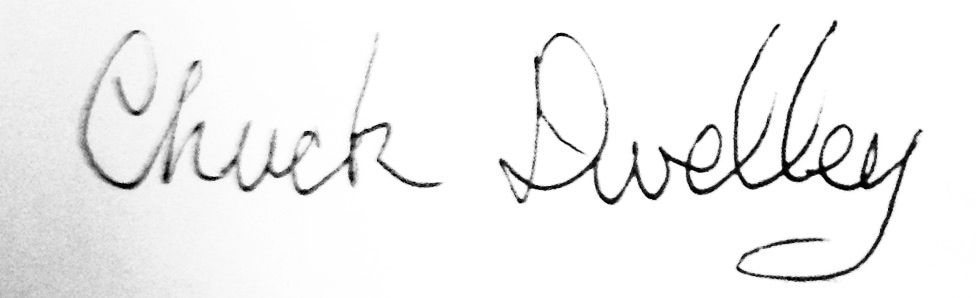

Charles Muth Dwelley (March 8, 1908 – September 30, 1993) was a community activist of Skagit County and owner/editor in chief of The Concrete Herald newspaper for over 40 years, from 1929 to 1970. Many of his editorials were quoted nationwide in Reader's Digest, The New York Times, etc. and occasionally referred to among professional journalists as "Dwellisms." He served as the president of the Washington State Publishers' Association in 1957 and 1958, received multiple awards in journalism, and repeatedly represented Washington State at the National Editorial Association.

== Personal life ==
Three generations of Dwelleys: Charles Lemuel, Charles Muth ("Chuck"), and Art.

Dwelley was born in Mount Vernon, Washington, on March 8, 1908, into the family of Charles Lemuel Dwelley (1878–1964) and Mary Elizabeth Muth Dwelley (1877–1954). He was often referred to as "Chuck" to distinguish him from his father. The family had two other children: Chuck's older sister, Dorothy (born in 1905), and his younger brother, William (born in 1916).

Dwelley's father, Charles Lemuel, was the fourth child of Joseph F. Dwelley, one of the first settlers of Skagit County, who arrived in Washington from Kittery, Maine, in 1870. The family moved to Anacortes, Washington in 1910, shortly after Chuck's birth, where Chuck's father worked at a pulp mill until his retirement. Chuck graduated from Anacortes High School in 1925.

Dwelley was married three times. He married his first wife, Helen Lyle Grubb of Anacortes (born in 1910), on June 13, 1927. Following employment opportunities, the couple first moved to Sedro-Woolley, and in 1929, to Concrete, Washington, to work for The Concrete Herald. Their only child, Arthur "Art" Gilbert Dwelley, was born February 6, 1930. The couple lived on the top floor of the building where they published the newspaper most of their lives, until they divorced in the summer of 1961. Helen moved to Mount Vernon in July 1961, and died there in 1969.

Dwelley remarried on January 1, 1962. His second wife, Alice May Hurn, was born in Three Lakes, Washington in 1913. A widow with four children, she was treasurer of the Shepherd of the Hills Lutheran Church near Three Lakes in Snohomish County, Washington before moving to Concrete with Dwelley. Alice died on May 6, 1967, at the age 54.

On March 16, 1968, Dwelley remarried for the last time. His third wife, Helen Lenore Pemberton (born December 14, 1910), held a journalism degree from Washington State University. She worked on internal publication for General Dynamics Corporation, and left her job to live with Dwelley in Concrete. In the early 1990s, the couple moved to Tenino, Washington, to live with Dwelley's son, Art. Charles Dwelley died on September 30, 1993. He was buried in Pleasant Ridge Cemetery in La Conner, Washington. Helen moved to California, where she died on November 18, 2011, at almost 101 years old. She was buried next to Dwelley in La Conner.

All three of Dwelley's wives helped him write for The Concrete Herald. His son, Art followed his father's trade: he edited and published a local newspaper (the Tenino Independent), was a community activist, and became a local historian. He died on October 10, 2000.

== Career in journalism ==
Dwelley started his career as a journalist working for the Anacortes Citizen newspaper in Anacortes, Washington, where he had lived since early childhood. After his marriage, he moved to Sedro-Woolley to work for The Courier Times. In 1929, Frank Evans, editor of The Courier Times, sent Dwelley to Concrete, Washington, in an effort to save a failing local newspaper: The Concrete Herald, which Evans just purchased.

=== The Concrete Herald ===
Evans and Dwelley assumed ownership of the newspaper and its debts, reincorporating it in 1930. Shortly afterwards, the Depression struck. The financial situation for the newspaper remained dire throughout the 1930s. In one incident, Dwelley invited his readers to pay for the newspaper issue that he couldn't publish for medical reasons in order to help pay for his medical bill.

Living with his wife and newborn son in the same building where he operated Linotype machines, young Dwelley worked hard and managed to make the newspaper work, eventually paying all the debts and buying out Evans' share. He is credited with "rescuing the failing Concrete Herald." Many of his peers, including fellow editor and politician Sim Wilson, noted the accomplishment of maintaining a profitable newspaper in a small town. From 1930 to 1943, the population of Concrete declined slightly, but the number of Herald subscriptions rose by 67%.

==== World War II interruption ====
On March 27, 1944, Dwelley learned that his younger brother William had been killed in the European theater of war, and voluntarily enlisted in the Navy. He received bootcamp training at Farragut, Idaho, and graduated with honors as Torpedoman Third Class from the Torpedo School at Naval Base San Diego as in December 1944. Dwelley was assigned to the Seventh Fleet and stationed in the Admiralty Islands. As it became apparent that the Navy has a surplus of torpedomen, in April 1945 he was assigned to Manila, Philippines, as a shore patrol officer. Dwelley returned to Seattle on a liberty ship on December 10, 1945, and was discharged at Bremerton, Washington, on December 16, having served 21 months.

During this time, Dwelley's wife, Helen Lyle, edited a truncated version of The Concrete Herald from April 1944 to November 1944, but couldn't keep up. From November 2, 1944, to May 31, 1945, the newspaper's publication was completely suspended.

==== Libel controversy ====
In 1956, The Concrete Herald and Dwelley personally were sued for libel by Jacob Koops, a police judge of the city of Lyman, Washington, in connection to Dwelley's July 1955 editorial comments on the conduct of Koop's office. At that time, a Washington State Supreme Court decision imposed serious limitations on criticism in newspaper columns. The proceedings lasted almost three years, but the court eventually acquitted Dwelley and his paper, which Dwelley celebrated with an 80-point bold headline "WE WON," surpassing the size of the headlines proclaiming the end of World War II.

==== The Concrete Herald at its zenith ====
View source data.
● Number of paid subscriptions
● Population of Concrete

The Concrete Herald statistics in Dwelley years (Note: The statistics for Concrete's population and newspaper circulation is based on the following sources: 1930–1969: N.W. Ayer & Son's Directory of Newspapers and Periodicals. Philadelphia: N. W. Ayer & Son. LCCN 01031589. OCLC 5337416.; 1970: "Ayer directory, newspapers, magazines and trade publications". N.W. Ayer & Son's Directory, Newspapers and Periodicals. Philadelphia: Ayer Press. ISSN 0067-2696. LCCN 81004513. OCLC 1518958.)

From 1949 on, Dwelley's editorials were cited on the radio nationwide, reprinted in nationwide publications such as Reader's Digest and The New York Times, praised for their "wry sense of humor," and referred to among professional journalists as "Dwellisms."

Dwelley believed that editorials were an integral part of a local newspaper, and that editors should express their personal opinions to make local newspapers interesting and worthy. He also advocated short editorials as more effective at delivering the point to the readers.

In 1951, over 75% of the Herald's subscribers were local residents of Concrete, but throughout the 1950s, The Concrete Herald subscription base rose to include all of upper Skagit Valley, from Lyman in the west to Newhalem in the northeast. In 1956, the Herald was believed to be "one of the finest edited newspapers in the state." By 1957, the circulation of the Herald exceeded the population of Concrete.

Dwelley's editorials won first-place awards from the Washington State Press Club two years in a row, in 1949 and in 1950. In 1952, he was at the center of attention again, labeled a "Ladies' man" by his colleagues when Ladies' Home Journal picked Dwelley as among the four best editorial writers in United States. In the same year, Dwelley won the second-place award for Distinguished Reporting from the Washington State Press Club.

In 1951, Dwelley published a special 44-page edition of The Concrete Herald commemorating the 50th anniversary of the paper, for which he received a first-place award from the National Newspaper Association.

From 1953 until 1957, Dwelley and his wife Helen served as judges for the Washington State Press Club contests. In 1958 (when he was off the panel of judges) Dwelley won another first-place prize for Excellence in Community Service. The last award Dwelley received for his work on The Concrete Herald was first place in Newspaper Leadership, in April 1970.

==== The sale of The Concrete Herald and its aftermath ====
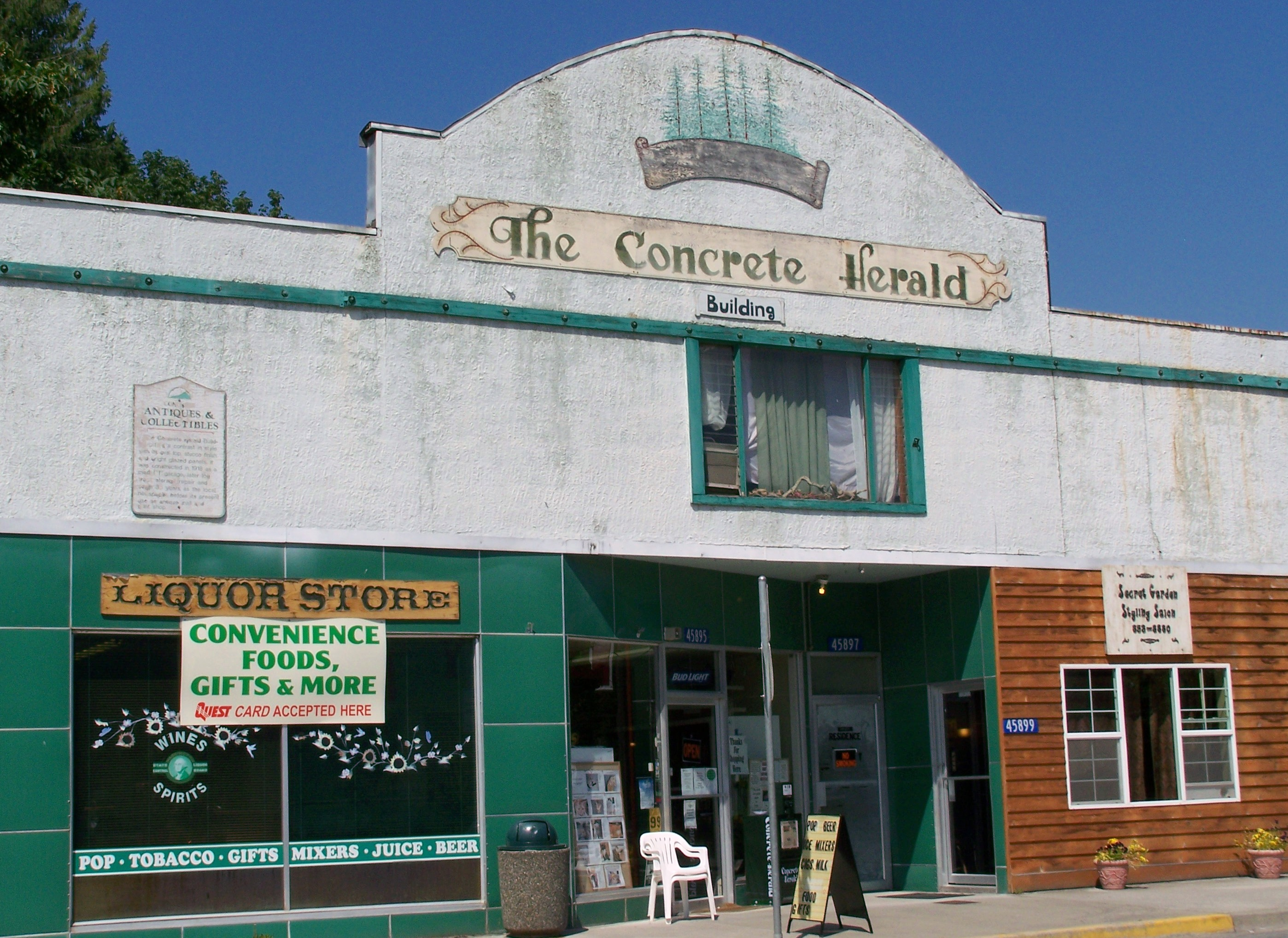
The Concrete Herald building on Main street in Concrete, WA, occupied by local stores. It still carries the embellishments and the distinctive green color that Dwelley applied in the 1950s.

In September 1970, having marked 40 years of editing the newspaper, Dwelley retired, selling The Concrete Herald to Robert and June Fader. Dwelley corresponded with the paper's new editors, praising occasional "scathing" editorials. In 1989, however, Herald readers were "shocked" when the paper was sold to an opportunistic businessman with no experience in publishing, John Falavolito. In two years, The Concrete Herald had failed and ceased publication.

Eighteen years later, in 2009, Concrete resident Jason Miller revived the newspaper in both paper and electronic formats. The successful resurrection of the paper version in the digital age came as a surprise for the publishing industry and reportedly "rejuvenated" local community.

=== Activity in journalist organizations ===
After Dwelley's editorials received national attention in 1949, he was asked to share his thoughts on newspaper editorials with the members of the Washington Newspaper Publishers' Association (WNPA). In 1950, he was elected secretary of the association. On November 17, 1950, at the University of Washington, Dwelley was initiated in Sigma Delta Chi.

Dwelley served on the Advisory Committee for the WNPA in 1952–1953 and on its Finance Committee in 1954–1955. He was elected to serve as the vice-president in 1956–57, and, finally, its president in 1957–58.

Dwelley represented Washington State on the National Editorial Association's Freedom of Information Committee in 1953–1954 and on the Editorial Page Committee in 1956–1957.

=== Retirement ===
After the Herald's sale in 1972, Dwelley's family moved to La Conner, Washington, where he continued writing and editing. For years, Dwelley wrote a column called "The Bridge Tender" for a local newspaper, the Channel Town Press, and published and edited a few history books, including a history of Concrete (And They Called the Town Concrete) and Skagit Memories. He was also elected an honorary lifetime member of the Washington Newspaper Publishers' Association, and occasionally attended its gatherings.

== Activism ==
In addition to editing and publishing The Concrete Herald, Dwelley was actively engaged in the local community. For 40 years beginning in 1929, Dwelley fought dust pollution created by the Superior Portland Cement Company, which operated a large cement plant in Concrete. Led by Dwelley, the community group from Concrete successfully involved Senator Lowell Peterson in the issue, conducted a dust emission study that proved a pollution level more than ten times over acceptable levels, and pushed for the creation of the Northwest Air Pollution Authority. Five days after the first meeting of the State Air Pollution Control Board, the plant operator completely closed the plant.

Dwelley also fought for the development of local infrastructure, and beginning in 1948, led the campaign that resulted in the construction of the North Cascades Highway. He was elected president of the North Cross-State Highway Association in 1959. Through his editorials, Dwelley successfully campaigned for the construction of the first bridge across Skagit River in the upper valley. In August 2006, a plaque honoring Dwelley's efforts was mounted on the bridge.

For several years, Dwelley presided over the Concrete Chamber of Commerce. In 1960, he received a Lions Clubs International award for his community service to Concrete.

== Bibliography ==
- Dwelley, Charles M. (1980). So They Called The Town 'Concrete': A Story of Life and Times in Unique Concrete, Washington. The Concrete Herald. ASIN B007FD9DAI. LCCN 80125676. OCLC 6709984.
- Dwelley, Charles M.; Dwelley, Helen May (1979). Skagit Memories: stories of the settlement years as written by the pioneers themselves. Skagit County Historical Society series. Mount Vernon, Washington: Skagit County Historical Society. LCCN 79066342.

== See also ==
- The Concrete Herald
- Concrete, Washington
- Skagit County

== Literature cited ==
- "Directory of Washington Newspapers", Washington Newspaper, vol. 14, no. 4, Seattle: University of Washington, pp. 1–16, January 1, 1929, LCCN ca20000342, OCLC 2486924
- "Charley Dwelley …", Washington Newspaper, vol. 15, no. 1, Seattle: University of Washington, October 1, 1929, LCCN ca20000342, OCLC 2486924
- N. W. Ayer & Son's directory of newspapers and periodicals, Philadelphia: N. W. Ayer & Son, 1930, ISSN 2638-8308, LCCN 01031589, OCLC 5337416
- "Mr. and Mrs. Charles Dwelley …", Washington Newspaper, vol. 15, no. 6, Seattle: University of Washington, March 1, 1930, LCCN ca20000342, OCLC 2486924
- "Incorporations", Seattle Times, Seattle: Frank A. Blethen, p. 28, March 16, 1930, ISSN 0745-9696, LCCN sn83009191, OCLC 9198928
- N. W. Ayer & Son's directory of newspapers and periodicals, Philadelphia: N. W. Ayer & Son, 1931, ISSN 2638-8308, LCCN 01031589, OCLC 5337416
- "No Paper, But Editor Invites Operation Aid", Seattle Times, Seattle: Frank A. Blethen, p. 2, April 2, 1939, ISSN 0745-9696, LCCN sn83009191, OCLC 9198928
- N. W. Ayer & Son's directory of newspapers and periodicals, Philadelphia: N. W. Ayer & Son, 1943, ISSN 2638-8308, LCCN 01031589, OCLC 5337416
- "Off to the Wars Goes Publisher", Washington Newspaper, vol. 29, no. 7, Seattle: University of Washington, p. 6, April 1, 1944, LCCN ca20000342, OCLC 2486924
- "Seaman Dwelley Makes It in High", Washington Newspaper, vol. 30, no. 3, Seattle: University of Washington, p. 2, December 1, 1944, LCCN ca20000342, OCLC 2486924
- "Dwelley Again Dwells in Peace; Returns After 21 Months, Navy", Washington Newspaper, vol. 31, no. 4, Seattle: University of Washington, p. 2, January 1, 1946, LCCN ca20000342, OCLC 2486924
- "North Cascades Highway Urged", Seattle Times, Seattle: Frank A. Blethen, p. 2, January 29, 1948, ISSN 0745-9696, LCCN sn83009191, OCLC 9198928
- "Puffed Up", Washington Newspaper, vol. 35, no. 4, Seattle: University of Washington, p. 1, February 1, 1949, LCCN ca20000342, OCLC 2486924
- "30 News Writers Get Press Club Awards", Seattle Times, Seattle: Frank A. Blethen, p. 38, April 1, 1949, ISSN 0745-9696, LCCN sn83009191, OCLC 9198928
- "Dwelley Says Short Editorials Mean Beefsteak in the Dinner Pot", Washington Newspaper, vol. 35, no. 8, Seattle: University of Washington, pp. 1–10, May 1, 1950, LCCN ca20000342, OCLC 2486924
- "Bill Wilmot Elected 1950–51 WNPA President", Washington Newspaper, vol. 35, no. 11, Seattle: University of Washington, p. 1, August 1, 1950, LCCN ca20000342, OCLC 2486924
- "Charles M. Dwelley Now Sigma Delta Chi", Washington Newspaper, vol. 36, no. 4, Seattle: University of Washington, p. 1, January 1, 1951, LCCN ca20000342, OCLC 2486924
- "Newspaper Writers Win Awards", Seattle Times, Seattle: Frank A. Blethen, p. 13, May 18, 1951, ISSN 0745-9696, LCCN sn83009191, OCLC 9198928
- "Eleven Weekly Newspaper Writers Honored With Washington State Press Club Awards", Washington Newspaper, vol. 36, no. 9, Seattle: University of Washington, p. 1, June 1, 1951, LCCN ca20000342, OCLC 2486924
- "Concrete Herald Commemorates Fiftieth Anniversary This Year", Washington Newspaper, vol. 36, no. 9, Seattle: University of Washington, p. 6, June 1, 1951, LCCN ca20000342, OCLC 2486924
- "Concrete Editor Gets Newspaper Recognition", Washington Newspaper, vol. 37, no. 4, Seattle: University of Washington, p. 4, January 1, 1952, LCCN ca20000342, OCLC 2486924
- "Winners in State Press Club Writing Contest", Washington Newspaper, vol. 37, no. 9, Seattle: University of Washington, p. 1, June 1, 1952, LCCN ca20000342, OCLC 2486924
- "President Pat O'Neil Names Members To Serve on WNPA Committees for 1952–53", Washington Newspaper, vol. 38, no. 1, Seattle: University of Washington, p. 1, October 1, 1952, LCCN ca20000342, OCLC 2486924
- "National Advertising — Alphabetically by Towns", Washington Newspaper, vol. 38, no. 3, Seattle: University of Washington, pp. 6–10, December 1, 1952, LCCN ca20000342, OCLC 2486924
- "Concrete Herald Spruces Up Shop; Spring Fever?", Washington Newspaper, vol. 38, no. 6, Seattle: University of Washington, p. 9, March 1, 1953, LCCN ca20000342, OCLC 2486924
- "Washington Publishers On NEA Committees", Washington Newspaper, vol. 38, no. 10, Seattle: University of Washington, p. 9, July 1, 1953, LCCN ca20000342, OCLC 2486924
- "President Emert Names Board of Trustees, Committees For WNPA 954-55 Operation", Washington Newspaper, vol. 40, no. 1, Seattle: University of Washington, p. 3, October 1, 1954, LCCN ca20000342, OCLC 2486924
- "Libel Becoming Greater Problem", Washington Newspaper, vol. 40, no. 10, Seattle: University of Washington, p. 4, July 1, 1955, LCCN ca20000342, OCLC 2486924
- "Bruce Wilson New President of WNPA; Dwelley, Peterson, Evans Elected", Washington Newspaper, vol. 41, no. 11, Seattle: University of Washington, p. 3, August 1, 1956, LCCN ca20000342, OCLC 2486924
- "New NEA Committees—Washington Appointments", Washington Newspaper, vol. 42, no. 1, Seattle: University of Washington, p. 6, October 1, 1956, LCCN ca20000342, OCLC 2486924
- N. W. Ayer & Son's directory of newspapers and periodicals, Philadelphia: N. W. Ayer & Son, 1957, ISSN 2638-8308, LCCN 01031589, OCLC 5337416
- "Suit Filed Against Concrete Herald", Washington Newspaper, vol. 42, no. 4, Seattle: University of Washington, p. 3, January 1, 1957, LCCN ca20000342, OCLC 2486924
- "Yakima Newsmen", Washington Newspaper, vol. 42, no. 7, Seattle: University of Washington, p. 2, April 1, 1957, LCCN ca20000342, OCLC 2486924
- "Charles Dwelley Elected WNPA President; Gay, Randich, Stoffel New WNPA Officers", Washington Newspaper, vol. 42, no. 11, Seattle: University of Washington, p. 3, August 1, 1957, LCCN ca20000342, OCLC 2486924
- "Concrete Paper Wins Libel Case", Seattle Times, Seattle: Frank A. Blethen, p. 2, June 12, 1958, ISSN 0745-9696, LCCN sn83009191, OCLC 9198928
- "Dwelley victor in $50,000 libel suit", Washington Newspaper, vol. 43, no. 10, Seattle: University of Washington, p. 3, July 1, 1958, LCCN ca20000342, OCLC 2486924
- "We Proudly Present … The Winnahs!", Washington Newspaper, vol. 44, no. 1, Seattle: University of Washington, p. 9, October 1, 1958, LCCN ca20000342, OCLC 2486924
- "Highway Group Names Head", Seattle Times, Seattle: Frank A. Blethen, p. 28, August 24, 1959, ISSN 0745-9696, LCCN sn83009191, OCLC 9198928
- "Trade Wind", Washington Newspaper, vol. 45, no. 11, Seattle: University of Washington, p. 4, August 1, 1960, LCCN ca20000342, OCLC 2486924
- "Trade Wind", Washington Newspaper, vol. 46, no. 4, Seattle: University of Washington, p. 5, January 1, 1961, LCCN ca20000342, OCLC 2486924
- "Mrs. Charles M. Dwelley, 54", Seattle Times, Seattle: Frank A. Blethen, p. 40, May 10, 1967, ISSN 0745-9696, LCCN sn83009191, OCLC 9198928
- "Town Promised Pollution Statement", Seattle Times, Seattle: Frank A. Blethen, p. 26, November 4, 1967, ISSN 0745-9696, LCCN sn83009191, OCLC 9198928
- "Lone Star Plans Closure at Concrete", Seattle Times, Seattle: Frank A. Blethen, p. 47, November 9, 1967, ISSN 0745-9696, LCCN sn83009191, OCLC 9198928
- "No More 'Native Gray'", Seattle Times, Seattle: Frank A. Blethen, p. 193, February 22, 1970, ISSN 0745-9696, LCCN sn83009191, OCLC 9198928
- "Congratulations", Washington Newspaper, vol. 55, no. 8, Seattle: University of Washington, p. 2, May 1, 1970, LCCN ca20000342, OCLC 2486924
- "Faders New Publishers of Concrete Herald", Washington Newspaper, vol. 56, no. 1, Seattle: University of Washington, p. 1, October 1, 1970, LCCN ca20000342, OCLC 2486924
- Ayer directory, newspapers, magazines and trade publications, Philadelphia: Ayer Press, 1971, ISSN 0067-2696, LCCN sn81004513, OCLC 1518958
- "N. W. District Meeting", Washington Newspaper, vol. 60, no. 5, Seattle: University of Washington, p. 12, February 1, 1975, LCCN ca20000342, OCLC 2486924
- Palmer, Gayle L., ed. (April 1, 1991), Washington State union list of newspapers on microfilm, Olympia: Washington State Library, LCCN 93100496, OCLC 24170966
- "Highway Booster Dies", Wenatchee World, Wenatchee: World Publishing Company, p. 13, October 8, 1993, LCCN sn86072042, OCLC 14402267
- "Passages", Seattle Times, Seattle: Frank A. Blethen, pp. A14, October 10, 1993, ISSN 0745-9696, LCCN sn83009191, OCLC 9198928
- "Charles Dwelley dies in Tenino", Washington Newspaper, vol. 78, no. 7, Seattle: University of Washington, p. 6, November 1, 1993, LCCN ca20000342, OCLC 2486924
- "Arthur Gilbert Dwelley, Concrete and Tenino (1930-2000)", Olympian, Olympia: Federated Publications, pp. B4, October 17, 2000, ISSN 0746-7575, LCCN sn83005979, OCLC 10253415
- Miller, Jason K., ed. (May 1, 2009), "It's baaack… Concrete Herald resumes publishing" (PDF), The Concrete Herald, vol. 92, no. 1, Concrete: Jason K. Miller, pp. 1–2, OCLC 14574917
- Bourasaw, Noel V. (December 17, 2005), Bourasaw, Noel V. (ed.), "Charles M. Dwelley, Concrete publisher for 40 years, and his historic Skagit family", Skagit River Journal of History and Folklore, La Conner: Skagit County Historical Society, OCLC 693269331
- Burkhalter, Aaron (April 15, 2012), "A Sense of Place: Moving past the past", Skagit Valley Herald, Mount Vernon: Skagit Valley Publishing Co., p. 1, ISSN 1071-197X, OCLC 61311930
- Connelly, Dolly (July 3, 1960), "Work Under Way on Northern Highway Through Cascades", Seattle Times, Seattle: Frank A. Blethen, pp. 62–63, ISSN 0745-9696, LCCN sn83009191, OCLC 9198928
- Duncan, Don (May 8, 1972), "Concrete: Softer than its name", Seattle Times, Seattle: Frank A. Blethen, pp. C16, ISSN 0745-9696, LCCN sn83009191, OCLC 9198928
- Dwelley, Charles (July 20, 1961), Dwelley, Charles (ed.), "Feathers from the Duster" (PDF), The Concrete Herald, vol. 61, no. 29, Concrete: Jason K. Miller, p. 1, OCLC 14574917
- Kunzler, Josef (August 1, 2006), Kunzler, Josef (ed.), "Tribute to Charles "Chuck" M. Dwelley and The Dalles Bridge", skagitriverhistory.com, Skagit Valley: Skagit River History Website
- Lacitis, Erik (February 7, 2009), "Town of Concrete embraces plans to restart local paper", Seattle Times, Seattle: Frank A. Blethen, ISSN 0745-9696, LCCN sn83009191, OCLC 9198928
- Miller, Jason K. (January 1, 2012), Miller, Jason K. (ed.), "Helen (Pemberton) Dwelley passes" (PDF), The Concrete Herald, vol. 95, no. 1, Concrete: Jason K. Miller, p. 4, OCLC 14574917
- Muller, Judy (2011), Emus Loose in Egnar: Big Stories from Small Towns, Lincoln: University of Nebraska Press, LCCN 2010051804, OCLC 679936550
- Pollack, Doris (October 1, 2009), Miller, Jason K. (ed.), "Charles Muth Dwelley: A Concrete publishing icon" (PDF), The Concrete Herald, vol. 92, no. 6, Concrete: Jason K. Miller, p. 5, OCLC 14574917
- Pryor, Nancy (January 1, 1981), Burke, Robert E. (ed.), "Northwest History News Notes", Pacific Northwest Quarterly, 72 (1), Seattle: University of Washington: 46–48, ISSN 0030-8803, JSTOR 40490667, LCCN 08030966, OCLC 2392232
- Royal, Dan (September 1, 2011), Miller, Jason K. (ed.), "This and That redux" (PDF), The Concrete Herald, vol. 94, no. 9, Concrete: Jason K. Miller, p. 6, OCLC 14574917
- Shiach, William Sidney; Averill, Harrison B. (1906), An Illustrated History of Skagit and Snohomish Counties: their people, their commerce and their resources, with an outline of the early history of the state of Washington (PDF), Chicago: Interstate Publishing Company, LCCN 06030900, OCLC 11299996
- Sorensen, Eric (July 1, 2001), "Concrete Conclusion – The forces of millennia converged to create a town, then destroy it", Seattle Times, Seattle: Frank A. Blethen, pp. D10, ISSN 0745-9696, LCCN sn83009191, OCLC 9198928
- White, Franny (August 20, 2007), "Upriver communities celebrate Cascade Days", Skagit Valley Herald, Mount Vernon: Skagit Valley Publishing Co., ISSN 1071-197X, OCLC 61311930
- Williams, Anne (October 1, 1993), "Charles M. 'Chuck' Dwelley", Skagit Valley Herald, Mount Vernon: Skagit Valley Publishing Co., ISSN 1071-197X, OCLC 61311930
