= Concrete Heritage Museum =

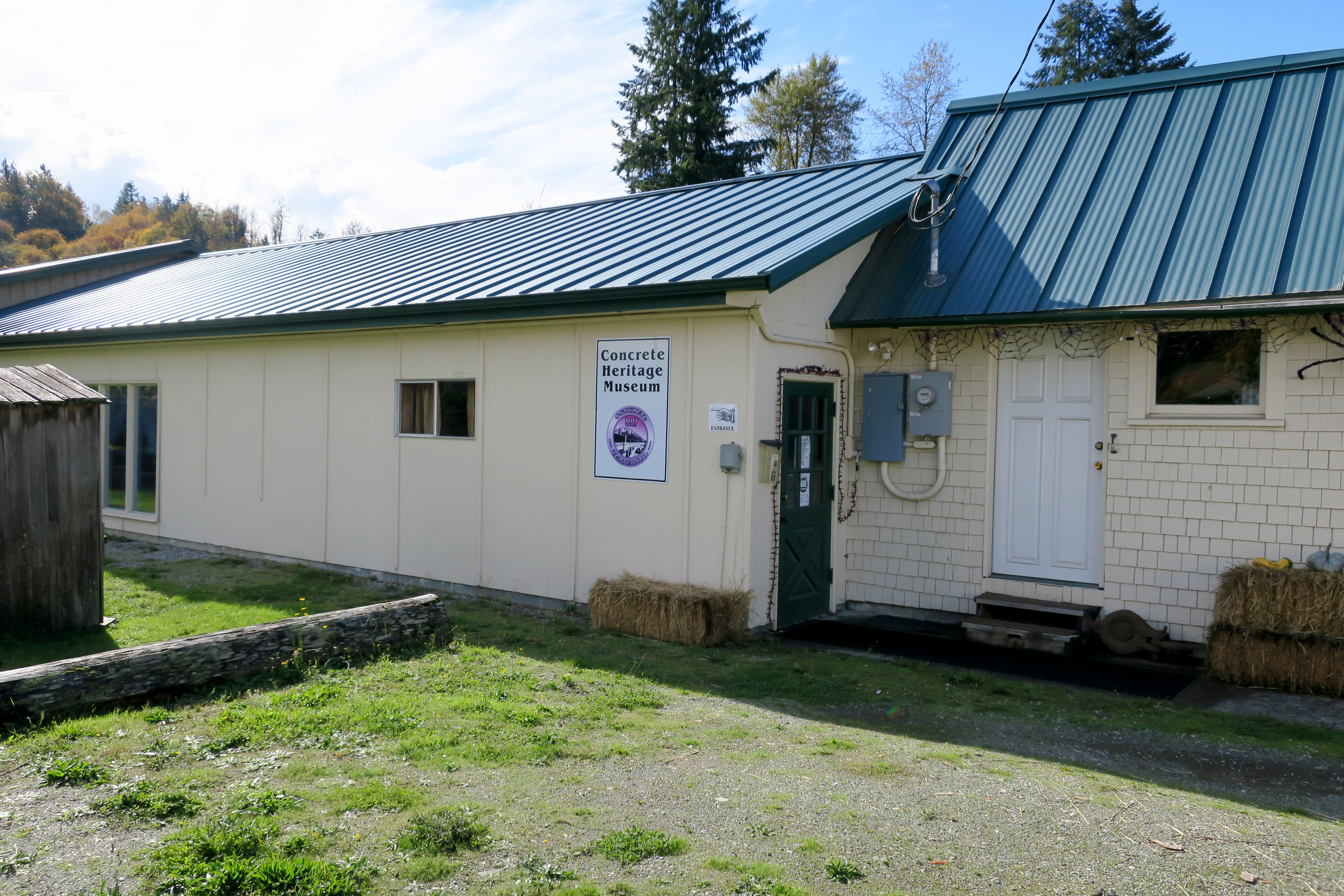
- Former name: Camp Seven Logging Museum
- Location: 7380 Thompson Ave, Concrete, Washington, 98237 United States
- Coordinates: 48.5383341°N 121.7457149°W
- Type: Local museum
- Founder: Herb Larsen
- President: Leatha Sullivan
- Parking: On site (no charge)
- Website: concreteheritagemuseum.org

The Concrete Heritage Museum (formerly Camp Seven Logging Museum) is a local heritage museum in Concrete, Washington. The museum focuses on the industrial history of the region, with collections dedicated to the Superior Portland Cement Company, the Lower Baker Dam, and the region's rich history of logging. The museum maintains an archive of The Concrete Herald, a historical local newspaper established in 1901. The museum has regular summer weekend hours, but is open by appointment only otherwise.

== History ==
The museum was founded in early 1980s by a retired Concrete judge Herb Larsen. Larsen initially named the museum the Camp Seven Logging Museum, as it was primarily dedicated to the history of logging camps of the area. Later, the museum also incorporated historical collections related to the cement industry of Concrete and regional railroad and hydroelectric power projects. In September 2009, the museum opened an exhibit displaying the contents of the time capsule that was interred on August 11, 1932, by the now defunct Superior Portland Cement Company.

== Gallery ==
=== Outdoor Exhibit ===
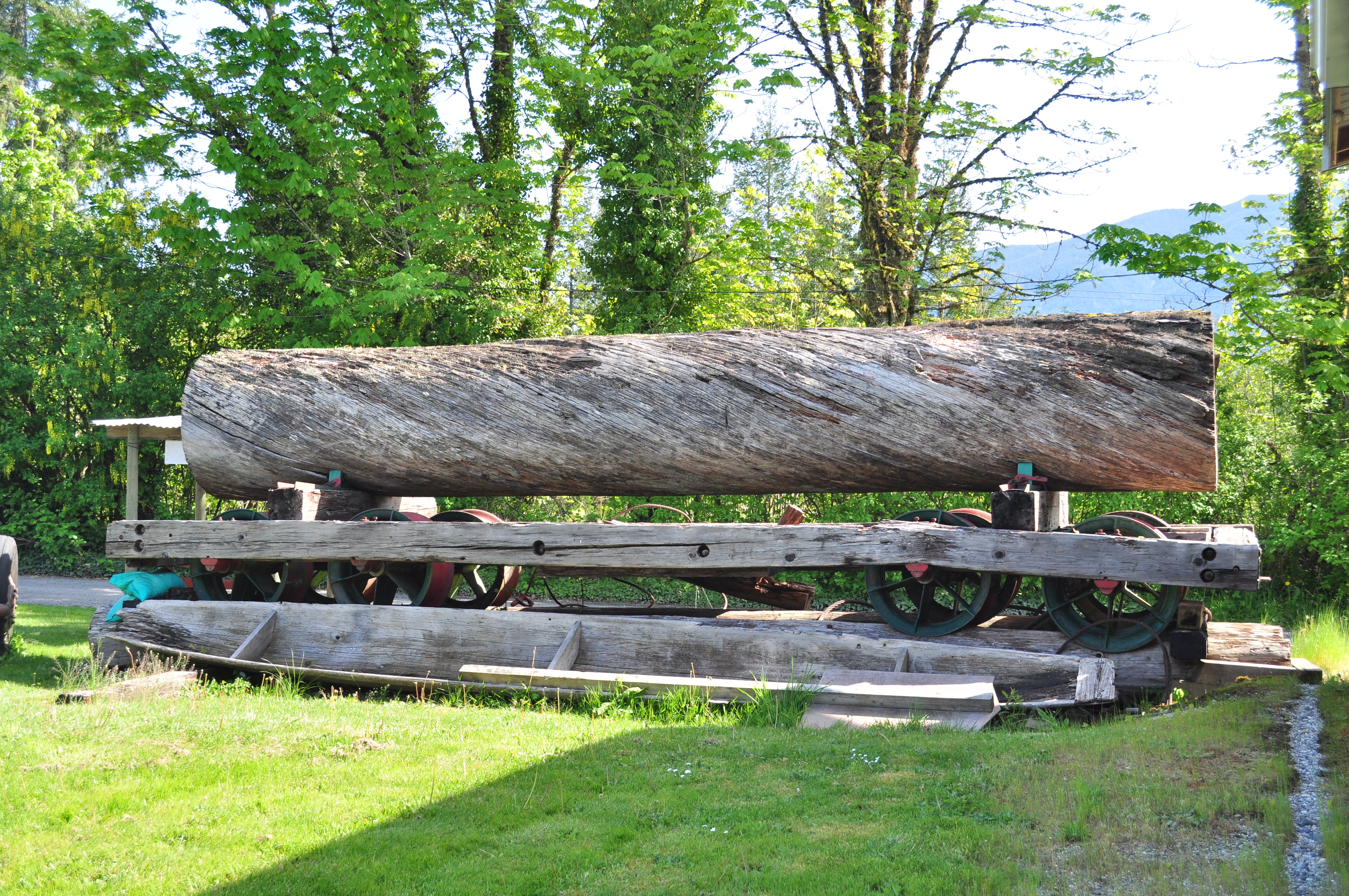

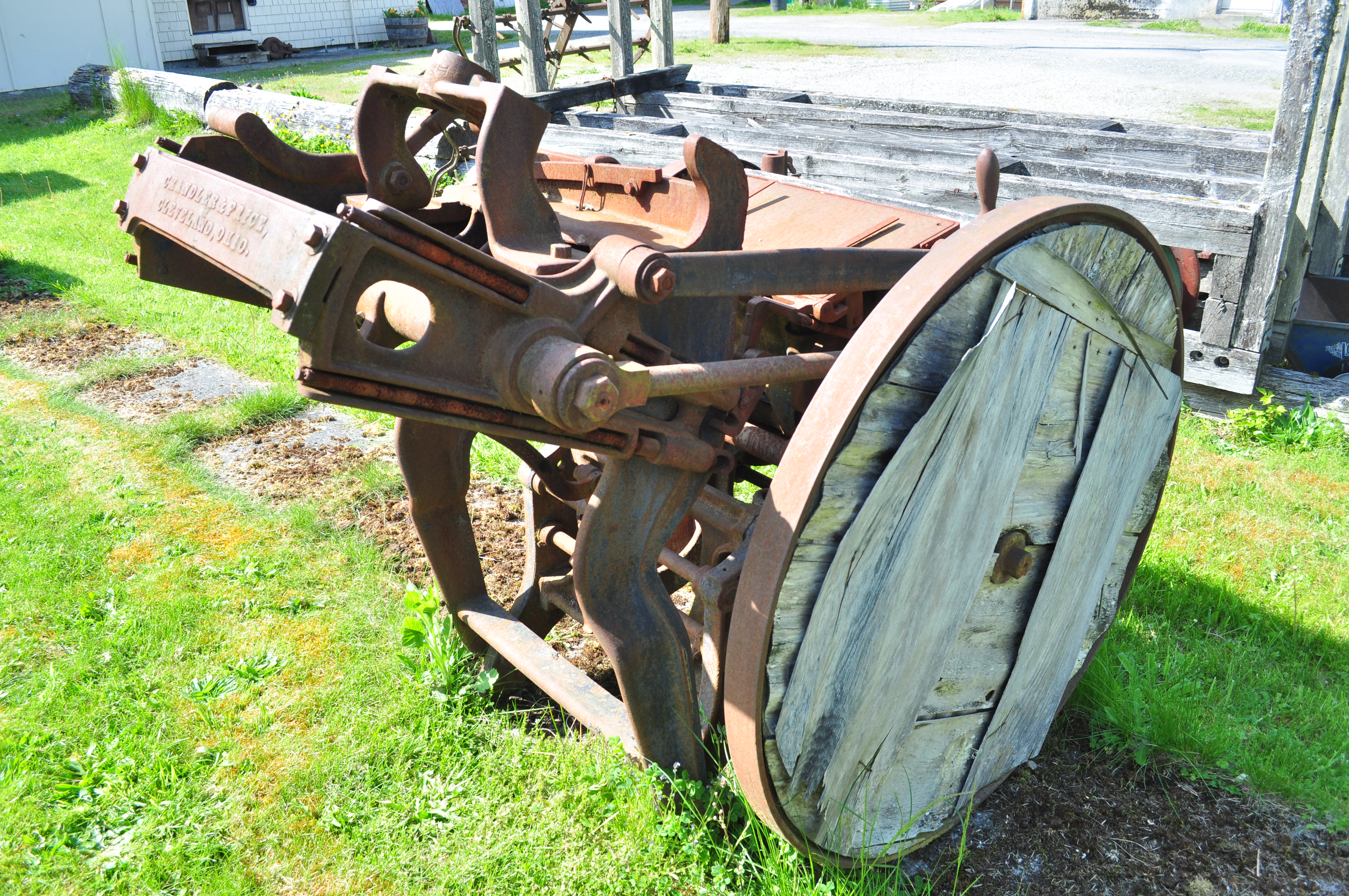

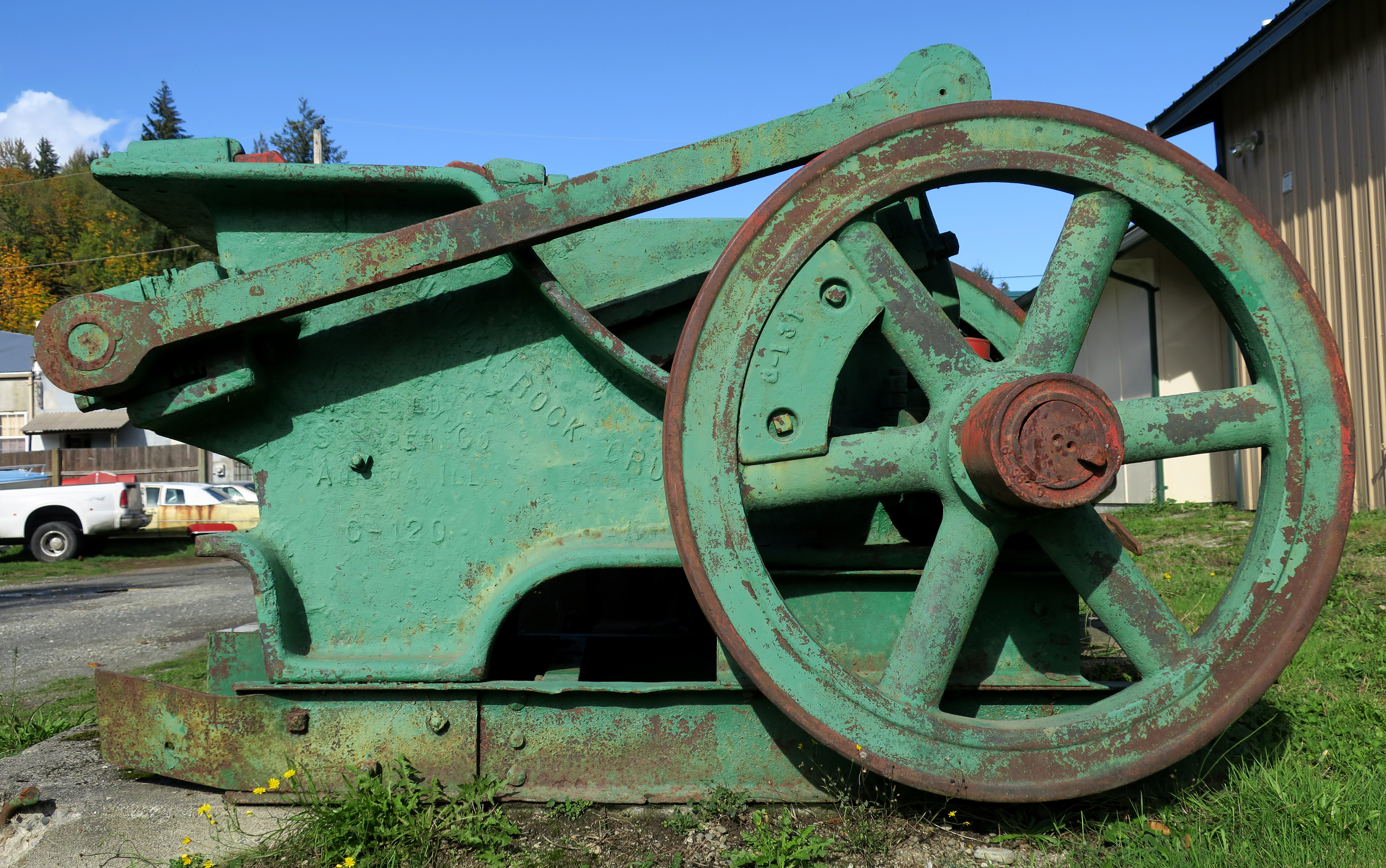

== See also ==
- Concrete, Washington
- Camp 6 Logging Museum

== Literature cited ==
- "Concrete Heritage Museum", concrete-wa.com, Concrete: Concrete Chamber of Commerce
- "Herb Larsen obituary", Skagit Valley Herald, Mount Vernon: Skagit Valley Publishing Co., February 26, 2007, ISSN 1071-197X, OCLC 61311930
- "Out and About", Skagit Valley Herald, Mount Vernon: Skagit Valley Publishing Co., June 9, 2016, ISSN 1071-197X, OCLC 61311930
- Baskas, Harriet (April 12, 2011), Dias, Meredith (ed.), Washington Curiosities: Quirky Characters, Roadside Oddities & Other Offbeat Stuff, Curiosities series (3 ed.), Lanham: Rowman & Littlefield, ISBN 0762761199, ISSN 1933-9739, LCCN 2011283277, OCLC 712160212
- Chickowski, Ericka (July 3, 2012), Washington, Moon handbooks (9 ed.), Berkeley: Avalon Travel Publishing, ISBN 1612381332, LCCN 2002212502, OCLC 760977711
- Ernst, Chloe (June 15, 2010), Day Trips from Seattle: Getaway Ideas For The Local Traveler, Day trips series (1 ed.), Guilford: Globe Pequot Press, ISBN 0762759593, ISSN 2155-5567, LCCN 2010203095, OCLC 435419134
- Miller, Jason K. (September 1, 2009), Miller, Jason K. (ed.), "Time capsule opened after 77 years" (PDF), The Concrete Herald, vol. 92, no. 5, Concrete: Jason K. Miller, pp. 1, 9, OCLC 14574917
