= Skagit Valley =

Valley in Washington, United States of America

Coordinates: 48°30′N 122°02′W

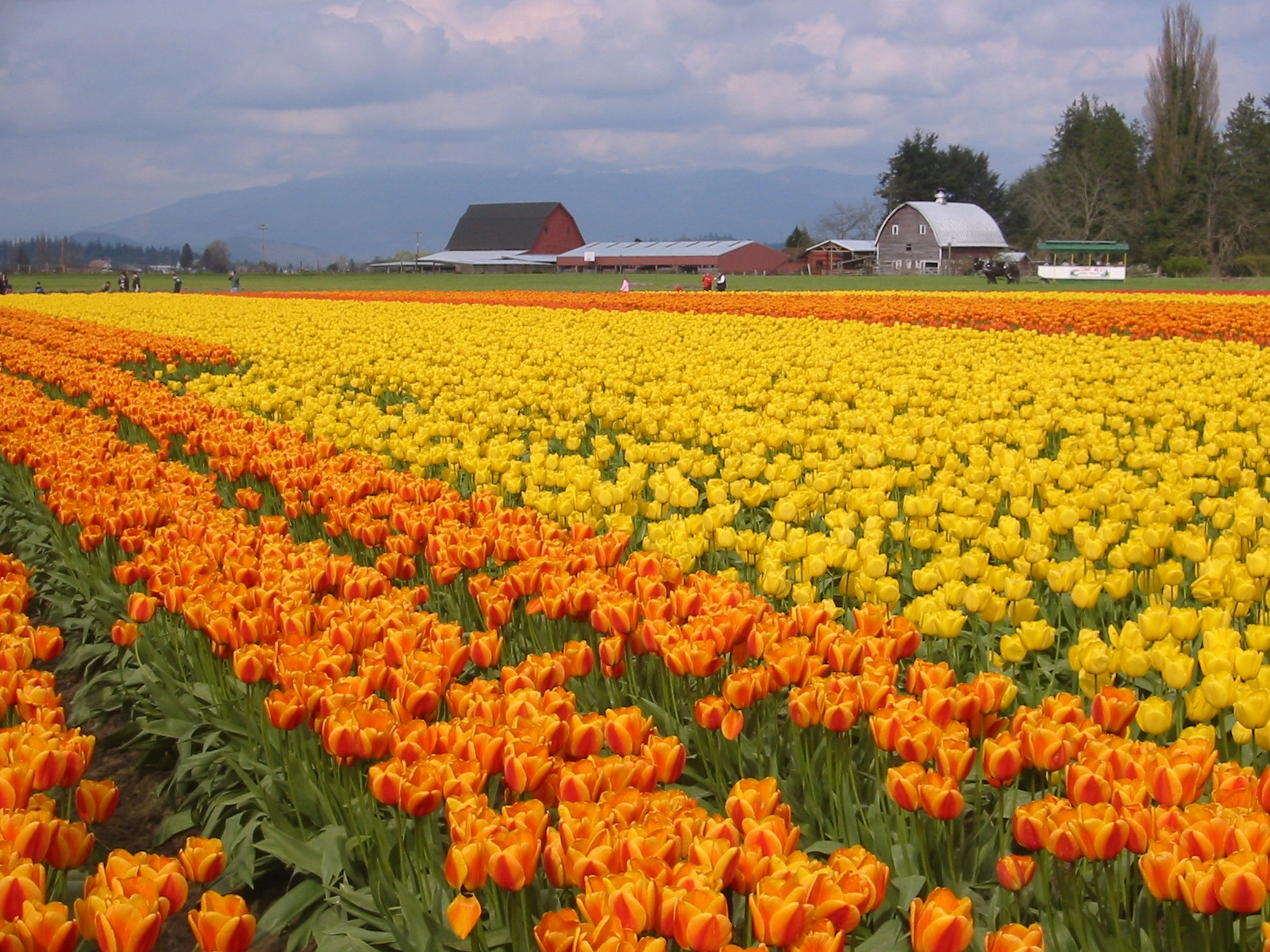
Tulips on a farm on the Skagit River delta

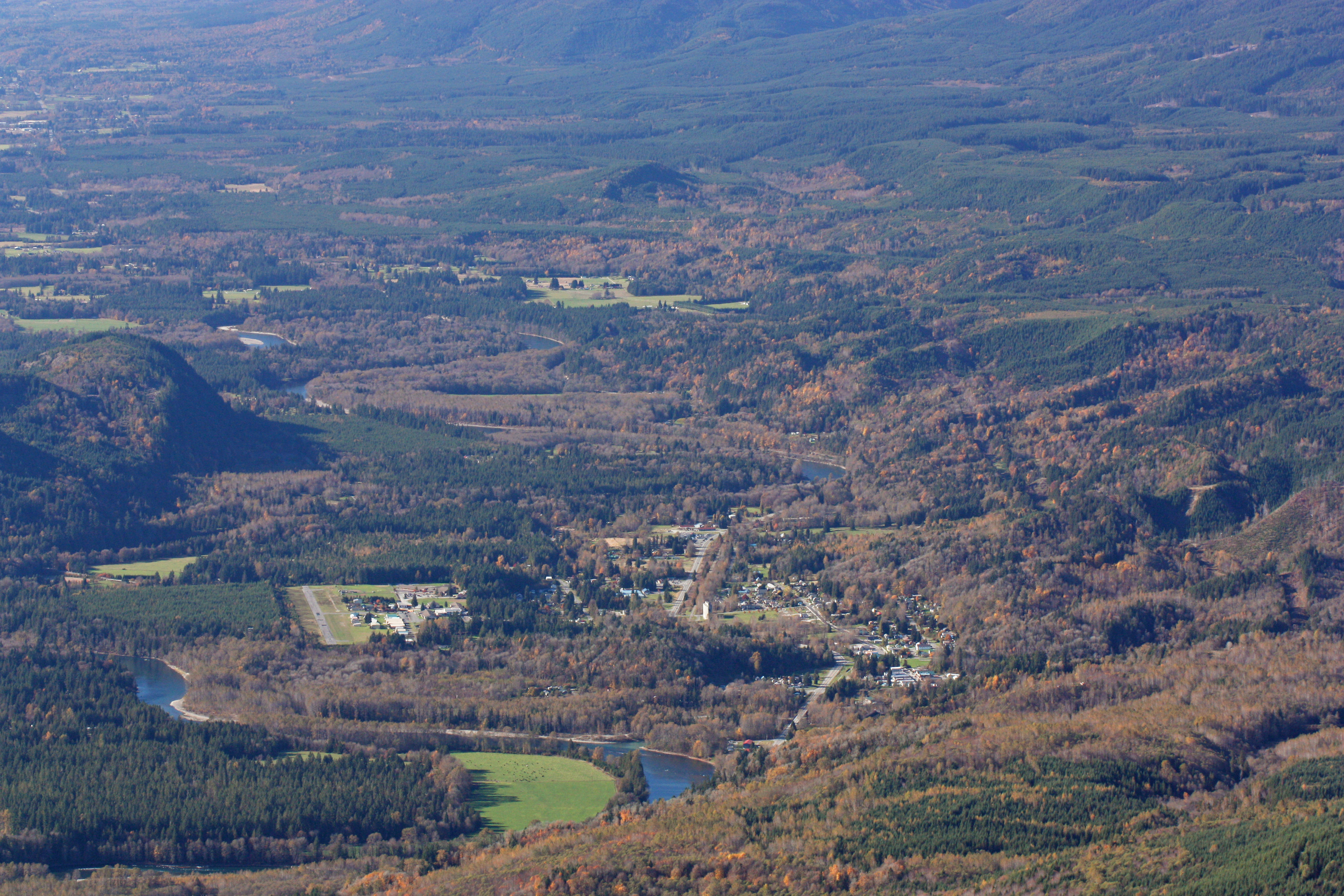
View west of the Skagit River Valley at Concrete (below center)

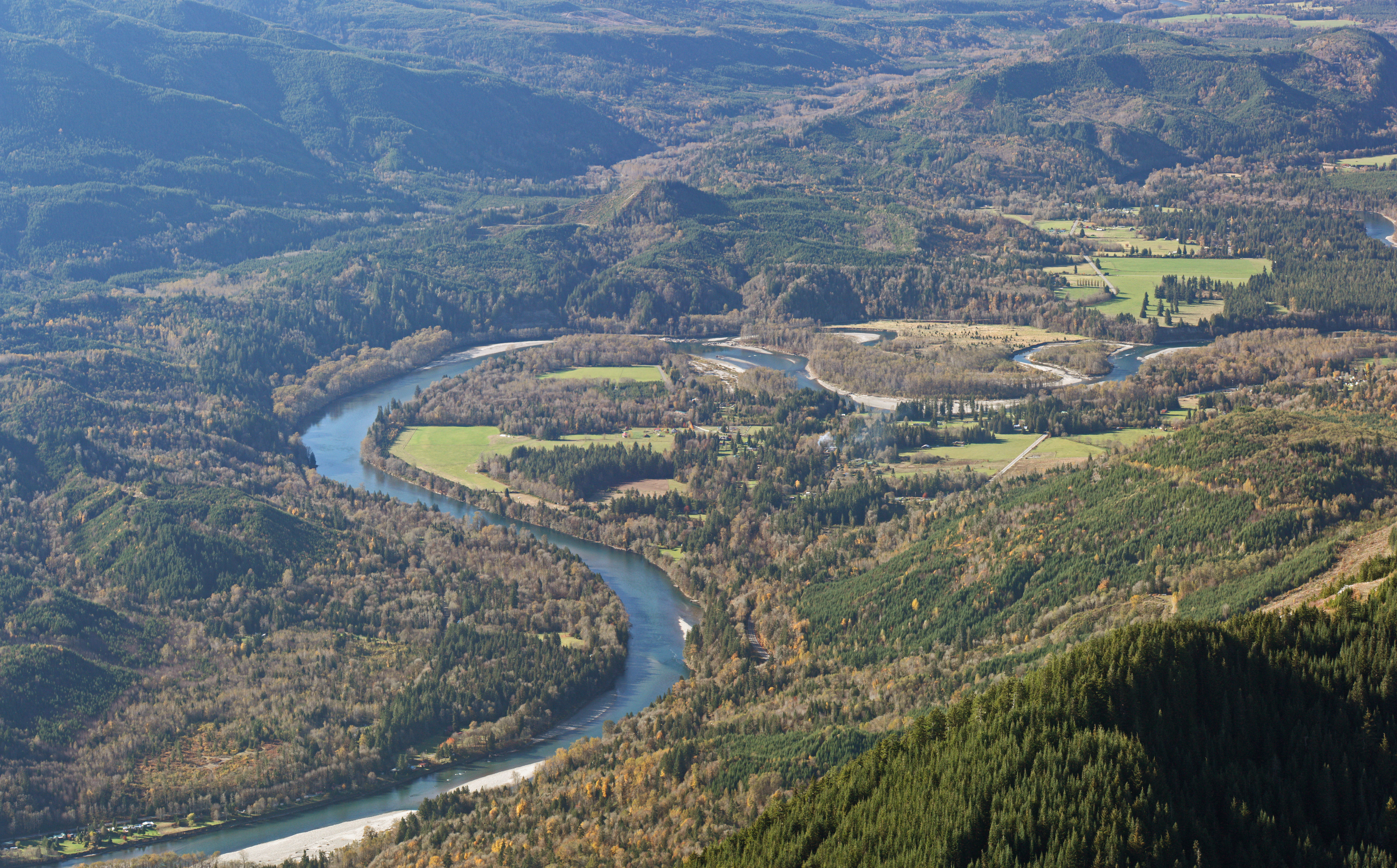
Skagit Valley between Rockport and Concrete seen from Sauk Mountain

The Skagit Valley lies in the northwestern corner of the state of Washington, United States. Its defining feature is the Skagit River, which snakes through local communities which include the seat of Skagit County, Mount Vernon, as well as Sedro-Woolley, Concrete, Lyman-Hamilton, and Burlington.

The local newspaper is Skagit Valley Herald, published in Mount Vernon, Washington.

Between 1967 and 1983, there was a plan by Puget Sound Power and Light Co. to build two nuclear power plants in Skagit Valley, but due to controversy, these plans were shelved.

== Tulip festival ==
The Skagit Valley Tulip Festival is a spring festival attended by thousands of visitors.

== Music ==
Several local musical groups, including the Fidalgo Youth Symphony and the Skagit Valley Chorale, bring together local amateur musicians from across the Skagit Valley. In 2020, the Skagit Valley Chorale made international headlines during the COVID-19 pandemic in the United States when an infected person attended a choir rehearsal, before COVID-19 was known to be spreading in the local community. As one of the clearest superspreading events early in the pandemic – choir members were able to tell researchers who stood next to whom throughout most of the evening – it was carefully studied by researchers, which resulted in recommendations used worldwide about how to avoid transmitting the virus.

== Film ==
The experimental horror film Skagit was set and shot in the Skagit Valley.

== See also ==
- Craft malting § Washington State
