= Stanwood Camano News =

Weekly newspaper published in Stanwood, Washington

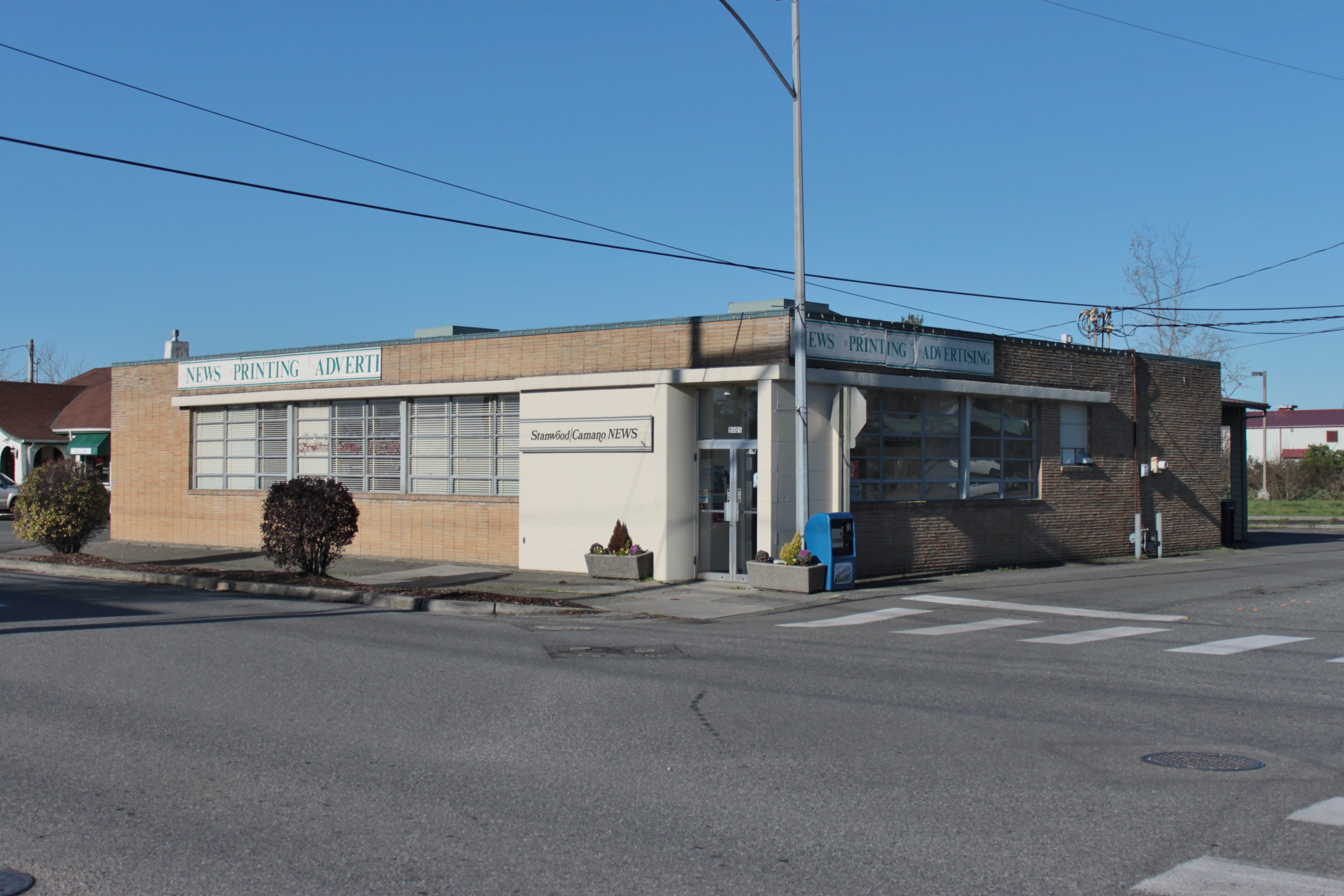
- The offices of Stanwood-Camano News in 2015.
- Type: Weekly newspaper
- Owner: Adams MultiMedia
- Founder: H. A. Clemens
- Publisher: Skagit Valley Publishing Co.
- Founded: 1903; 123 years ago
- Language: English
- Headquarters: 7208 267th Street NW; Stanwood, Washington, U.S.
- Circulation: 2,261 (as of 2020)
- Sister newspapers: Skagit Valley Herald
- ISSN: 1041-4304
- Website: goskagit.com/scnews

The Stanwood Camano News is a weekly newspaper serving Stanwood and Camano Island in the U.S. state of Washington. It had a circulation of 2,261 in 2020.

== History ==
H. A. Clemens founded the Stanwood Tidings in 1903 and operated the paper until retiring in 1920. He sold it to Frederick Ornes, who previously owned the Mount Vernon Argus. Ornes changed the paper's name to the Stanwood News soon after the sale. A year later Ornes sold the News to Lorin D. Angevine.

K. Kirby published the Fir-Conway Times for a single issue before ceasing. On his way out of town, Angevine chased him down and offered to buy the paper for two shirts and a hat. Angevine grew circulation to 150 and the Times became profitable. In April 1925, Angevine became part owner of the Mount Vernon Argus while Argus owner Ray Thorpe became part owner of the Stanwood News. Angevine sold his share in the Stanwood News in May to J. L. Asbury, who in turn sold it to Clyde F. Brown in 1926.

Brown changed the paper's name to Twin City News in 1930 and sold it to Harry Dence and Raymond Horn in 1938. The two men sold it to John Weber and Wally Funk in 1958, who owned the Anacortes American. Cliff Danielson, editor of the Oak Harbor News, was hired on as editor of the Twin City News. The new owners soon had the paper's office renovated. A year later the paper was sold again to Simeon R. Wilson, owner of the Marysville Globe; Danielson also reacquired his ownership stake. The paper's name was changed back to the Stanwood News. In 1980, the name was changed to Stanwood Camano News; two years later, the owner of the paper purchased the nearby Camano Island Sun.

Dave Pinkham became the owner and publisher in 1985. He had previously worked as a reporter and then editor at the Whidbey News-Times. In 2009, Pinkham retired and the paper entered into a partnership with the Skagit Valley Herald to manage the Stanwood paper. The Stanwood Camano News maintained its office in Stanwood, but the printing of the paper was moved off site in June 2009 to the Skagit Valley Herald's facility in Mount Vernon. In 2015, Pinkham sold the Stanwood Camano News to Pioneer News Group, publishers of the Mount Vernon-based Skagit Valley Herald. Two years later, all of Pioneer News Group's newspapers were sold to Adams Publishing Group. In 2021, the newspaper moved to a new office in Stanwood.

== See also ==
- List of newspapers in Washington (state)
