= Frank Blethen =

American executive and publisher (born 1945)

Frank A. Blethen
- Born: Francis Alden Blethen Jr. April 20, 1945 (age 81); Seattle, Washington
- Education: Arizona State University; Harvard Business School
- Occupation: CEO of The Seattle Times Company
- Years active: 1968–present
- Spouse: Charlene Blethen
- Children: Ryan Blethen; James Blethen

Frank A. Blethen (born April 20, 1945) is an American executive who served as the publisher of The Seattle Times and chief executive officer (CEO) of The Seattle Times Company, based in Seattle, Washington, United States. A fourth-generation member of the Blethen family, which has owned the newspaper since 1896, he became a publisher in 1985. He has also served as a publisher of the Walla Walla Union-Bulletin, another newspaper that was owned by the company in the 1970s. During his tenure as publisher, the family's control over the newspaper decreased, consistent with the profitability across the newspaper industry. The newspaper entered into a joint operating agreement with the Seattle Post-Intelligencer that lasted until it ceased printing in 2009.

== Early life and education ==
Francis Alden Blethen Jr. was born in Seattle on April 20, 1945, the second of two children of Francis Alden Blethen and his third wife, Kathleen Mary Ryan. He is a fourth-generation member of the Blethen family and the great-grandson of Seattle Times founder Alden J. Blethen. His parents divorced in 1951, and Blethen moved to Scottsdale, Arizona, with his mother and elder sister, Diane. He was the only member of the Blethen family to have been raised outside of Seattle. He returned to Seattle in the summers and spent time with his aunts, uncles, and cousins, but rarely saw his father. As a teenager, Blethen worked in the advertising department as a copy boy but had no intention of working in the newspaper business. Blethen has described himself as the "accidental publisher" because he had no intention of running the business until the 1980s. Blethen attended Arizona State University, where he majored in business studies. In 1978, he earned a master's degree from Harvard Business School.

== Career ==
After completing his senior year at Arizona State University, Blethen returned to Seattle after the death of his estranged father in 1967.Blethen began his career at the Seattle Times as the assistant credit manager and was promoted to credit manager when his boss took a leave of absence. Blethen held a variety of positions at the Seattle Times, including building manager, where he negotiated janitorial and security contracts and oversaw the remodeling of the cafeteria. Blethen also spent four years working at the Walla Walla Union-Bulletin in Walla Walla, Washington, beginning in 1974. He returned to the Seattle Times Company in 1980 and held various executive positions in advertising, circulation, marketing, and labor.

Blethen and his family also own the Yakima Herald-Republic, Walla Walla Union-Bulletin, and several other Seattle-area weeklies, including the Issaquah Press. He has been the publisher of the Times for over 30 years. While the Blethen family controls the Seattle Times Company, Frank Blethen's grandfather sold part interest in the company to the Ridder Bros., known today as Knight Ridder.

On May 13, 2024, Blethen announced that he would retire from his position as CEO and publisher of the Seattle Times in late 2025. He passed the role of publisher to his son, Ryan Blethen, while Alan Fisco became CEO.

== Activism ==
Blethen has donated to educational institutions and helped create the two-year Greater Good Campaign, a movement against the state legislature's defunding of higher public education. He has also been criticized for campaigning against taxes that would fund public education. He has received awards for contributions to promoting diversity in publishing. He has also been criticized for mixing business interests with content issues, which are traditionally separated at newspapers.

== Awards ==
- Edward R. Murrow Award for Lifetime Achievements in Journalism from WSU's School of Communications (1998).
- Asian American Journalist Associations' Special Recognition Award (2011)
- Northwest Journalist of Color Diversity Award (2011)
- AAJA Leadership in Diversity Award (2014) In 2018, the Seattle Times newsroom won the same award.
