= Lowell Peterson =

American politician

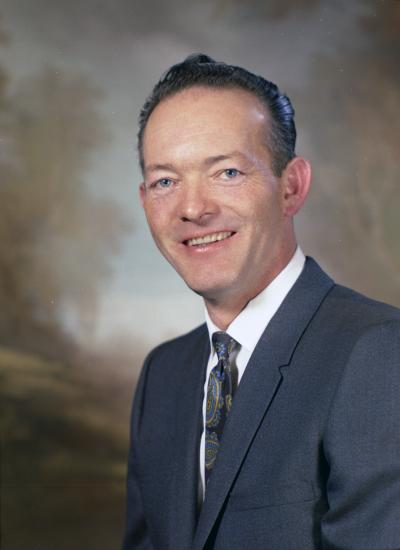

Member of the Washington Senate from the 40th district
- In office January 11, 1965 – September 1, 1987
- Preceded by: Ralph L. Rickdall
- Succeeded by: Patrick R. McMullen

Personal details
- Born: December 11, 1921 Pateros, Washington, U.S.
- Died: January 7, 1989 (aged 67) Washington, U.S.
- Party: Democratic

Lowell Peterson (December 11, 1921 – January 7, 1989) was an American politician in the state of Washington. He served in the Washington State Senate from 1965 to 1987.
