= Concrete, Washington =

- Town
- Concrete's town welcome sign, which was chainsaw-carved from cedar logs

- Seal

- Location of Concrete, Washington
- Coordinates: 48°32′17″N 121°44′52″W
- Country: United States
- State: Washington
- County: Skagit

Government
  - Type: Mayor–council
  - Mayor: Marla Reed

Area
  - Total: 1.21 sq mi (3.13 km^{2})
  - Land: 1.17 sq mi (3.04 km^{2})
  - Water: 0.035 sq mi (0.09 km^{2})
- Elevation: 233 ft (71 m)

Population (2020)
  - Total: 801
  - Density: 682/sq mi (263/km^{2})
- Time zone: UTC−8 (Pacific (PST))
  - Summer (DST): UTC−7 (PDT)
- ZIP Code: 98237
- Area code(s): 360, 564
- FIPS code: 53-14380
- GNIS feature ID: 2413237
- Website: Town of Concrete

Concrete is a town in north-central Skagit County, Washington, United States. It is part of the Mount Vernon-Anacortes, Washington Metropolitan Statistical Area, and had a population of 801 at the 2020 census.

== History ==
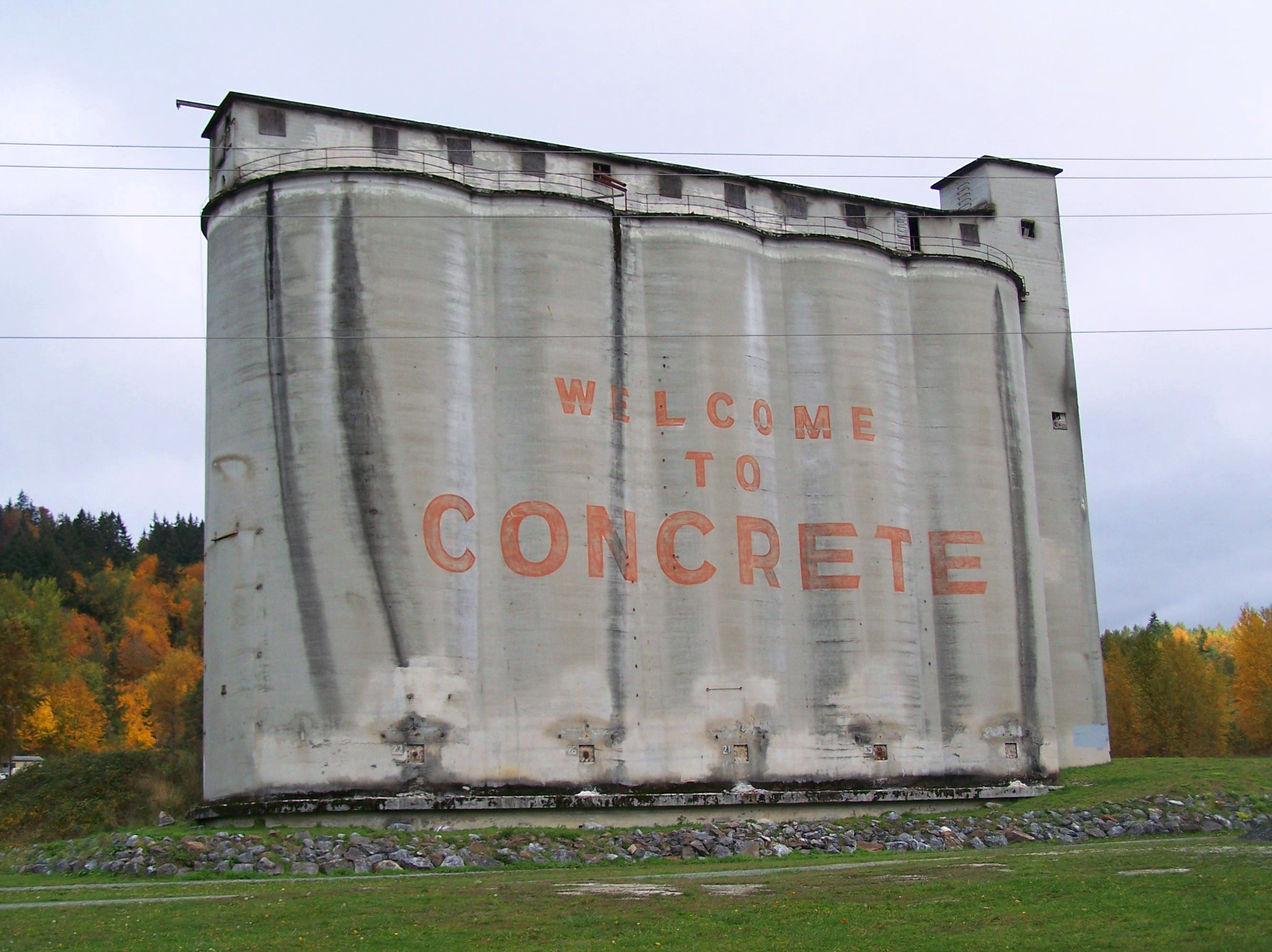
Portland Superior Cement Silos in Concrete, at Superior Avenue and Highway 20. The words "Welcome to Concrete" were painted on for the filming of This Boy's Life

The town of Concrete, Washington has undergone several incarnations, the earliest being a settlement at the northwestern junction of the Baker and Skagit Rivers, known as "Minnehaha." Amasa "Peg-Leg" Everett was one of the earliest settlers and in 1890, the townsite was platted by another settler, Magnus Miller. Shortly thereafter, a post office was established and the town name changed to "Baker." In 1905, a settlement across the Baker River came into being due to the building of the Washington Portland Cement Company and was named "Cement City." After the Superior Portland Cement Company plant was built in Baker in 1908, it was decided to merge the two towns. Inhabitants of the new community settled on the name "Concrete" and the town was so christened and officially incorporated on May 8, 1909.

== Geography ==
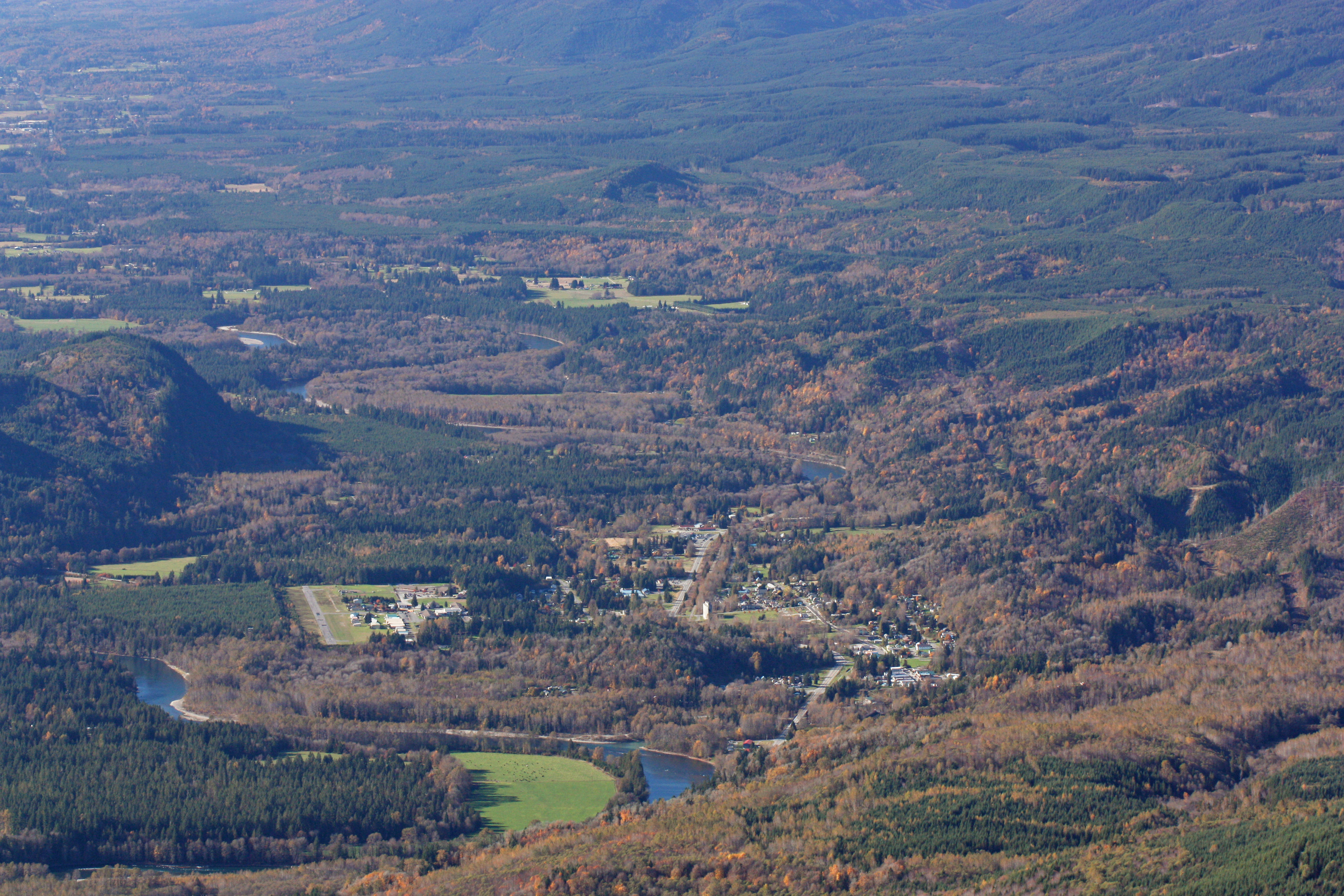
Concrete (below center) is located in the broad glacier-carved valley of the Skagit River at its confluence with Baker River (mostly hidden by trees).

According to the United States Census Bureau, the town has a total area of 1.24 square miles (3.21 km^{2}), of which, 1.22 square miles (3.16 km^{2}) is land and 0.02 square miles (0.05 km^{2}) is water.

The town lies mostly on the north bank of the Skagit River, and is split into half by the lower Baker River (a tributary to the Skagit River). Mount Baker, a stratovolcano, lies northwest of Concrete and Mount Shuksan lies almost directly north. Both peaks are part of the North Cascades range.

=== Climate ===
The town has a warm summer Mediterranean climate (Csb) with cool winters and warm, mostly dry summers. Precipitation mostly comes in the form of rain in Concrete but occasional snow can be seen with about 20 inches falling per year.

Climate data for Concrete, Washington
Month	Jan	Feb	Mar	Apr	May	Jun	Jul	Aug	Sep	Oct	Nov	Dec	Year
Record high °F (°C)	65 (18)	74 (23)	82 (28)	93 (34)	96 (36)	106 (41)	102 (39)	102 (39)	102 (39)	87 (31)	77 (25)	63 (17)	106 (41)
Mean daily maximum °F (°C)	42.7 (5.9)	46.9 (8.3)	51.7 (10.9)	58.3 (14.6)	65.3 (18.5)	69.0 (20.6)	75.6 (24.2)	76.7 (24.8)	70.8 (21.6)	59.4 (15.2)	48.3 (9.1)	42.2 (5.7)	58.9 (14.9)
Mean daily minimum °F (°C)	32.1 (0.1)	32.8 (0.4)	35.2 (1.8)	39.3 (4.1)	44.7 (7.1)	49.4 (9.7)	52.2 (11.2)	52.5 (11.4)	49.0 (9.4)	43.3 (6.3)	37.1 (2.8)	32.1 (0.1)	41.6 (5.4)
Record low °F (°C)	−1 (−18)	1 (−17)	11 (−12)	25 (−4)	29 (−2)	35 (2)	38 (3)	31 (−1)	30 (−1)	10 (−12)	7 (−14)	0 (−18)	−1 (−18)
Average precipitation inches (mm)	10.03 (255)	6.53 (166)	6.82 (173)	5.01 (127)	3.88 (99)	2.96 (75)	1.58 (40)	1.70 (43)	3.04 (77)	6.94 (176)	11.49 (292)	10.42 (265)	70.4 (1,788)
Average snowfall inches (cm)	5.0 (13)	3.4 (8.6)	1.3 (3.3)	0.1 (0.25)	0 (0)	0 (0)	0 (0)	0 (0)	0 (0)	0 (0)	1.2 (3.0)	7.6 (19)	18.6 (47.15)

== Demographics ==
Historical population
Census	Pop.	Note	%±
1910	945		—
1920	924		−2.2%
1930	736		−20.3%
1940	859		16.7%
1950	760		−11.5%
1960	840		10.5%
1970	573		−31.8%
1980	592		3.3%
1990	735		24.2%
2000	790		7.5%
2010	705		−10.8%
2020	801		13.6%
U.S. Decennial Census

=== 2010 census ===
As of the 2010 census, there were 705 people, 295 households, and 179 families residing in the town. The population density was 577.9 inhabitants per square mile (223.1/km^{2}). There were 358 housing units at an average density of 293.4 per square mile (113.3/km^{2}). The racial makeup of the town was 91.5% White, 0.3% African American, 2.0% Native American, 0.4% Asian, 1.1% Pacific Islander, 1.6% from other races, and 3.1% from two or more races. Hispanic or Latino people of any race were 5.5% of the population.

There were 295 households, of which 31.5% had children under the age of 18 living with them, 42.0% were married couples living together, 12.2% had a female householder with no husband present, 6.4% had a male householder with no wife present, and 39.3% were non-families. 29.2% of all households were made up of individuals, and 9.2% had someone living alone who was 65 years of age or older. The average household size was 2.39 and the average family size was 2.93.

The median age in the town was 40.4 years. 26.2% of residents were under the age of 18; 6.4% were between the ages of 18 and 24; 22.4% were from 25 to 44; 32.9% were from 45 to 64; and 12.1% were 65 years of age or older. The gender makeup of the town was 51.2% male and 48.8% female.

=== 2000 census ===
As of the 2000 census, there were 790 people, 300 households, and 198 families residing in the town. The population density was 650.3 people per square mile (252.1/km^{2}). There were 335 housing units at an average density of 275.8 per square mile (106.9/km^{2}). The racial makeup of the town was 92.78% White, 2.53% Native American, 0.89% Asian, 1.14% from other races, and 2.66% from two or more races. Hispanic or Latino people of any race were 2.66% of the population.

There were 300 households, out of which 37.0% had children under the age of 18 living with them, 45.3% were married couples living together, 14.3% had a female householder with no husband present, and 33.7% were non-families. 27.7% of all households were made up of individuals, and 11.7% had someone living alone who was 65 years of age or older. The average household size was 2.63 and the average family size was 3.19.

In the town, the population was spread out, with 34.1% under the age of 18, 5.4% from 18 to 24, 28.6% from 25 to 44, 20.8% from 45 to 64, and 11.1% who were 65 years of age or older. The median age was 33 years. For every 100 females, there were 97.0 males. For every 100 females age 18 and over, there were 100.4 males.

The median income for a household in the town was $29,375, and the median income for a family was $34,464. Males had a median income of $34,083 versus $17,083 for females. The per capita income for the town was $12,492. About 8.4% of families and 14.0% of the population were below the poverty line, including 15.4% of those under age 18 and 8.8% of those age 65 or over.

== Education ==
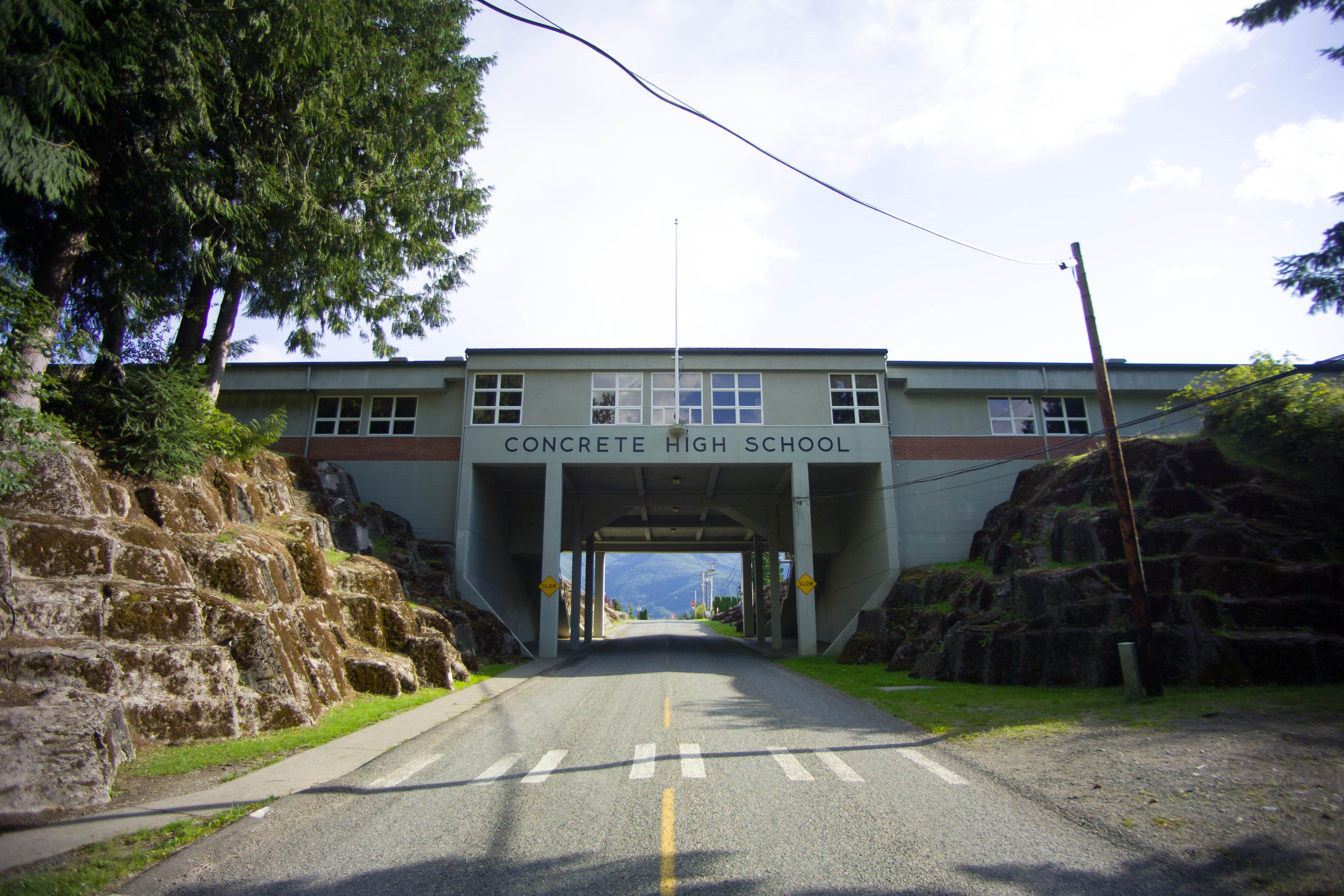
Concrete High School

The town is served by the Concrete School District.

== Arts and culture ==
Notable buildings and landmarks include:

- Henry Thompson Bridge - built in 1916–1918, it was named for a local settler killed by a logging train in 1918. At the time, it was either the longest single-span reinforced concrete bridge in the world or in the West. It is listed on the Washington State and National Register of historic places.
- Concrete High School was built in 1952. This Boy's Life was filmed there in 1993.
- The Concrete Herald building - built in 1918, owner and editor Charles Dwelley selected it as the location of The Concrete Herald (established in 1910).
- Town Hall - built in 1908 as a grade-school.
- Concrete Theatre - built in 1923, it is listed on the Washington Heritage Register.
- Lower Baker Dam - completed in 1925, and two years later raised to 293 feet (89 m), it was the highest hydroelectric dam in the world.
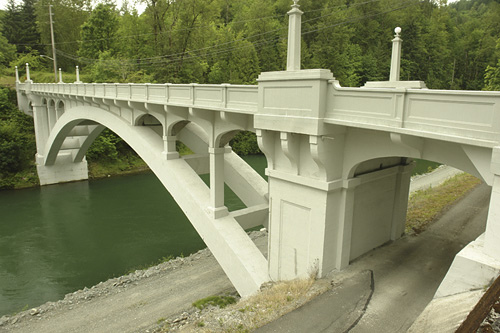
Henry Thompson Bridge

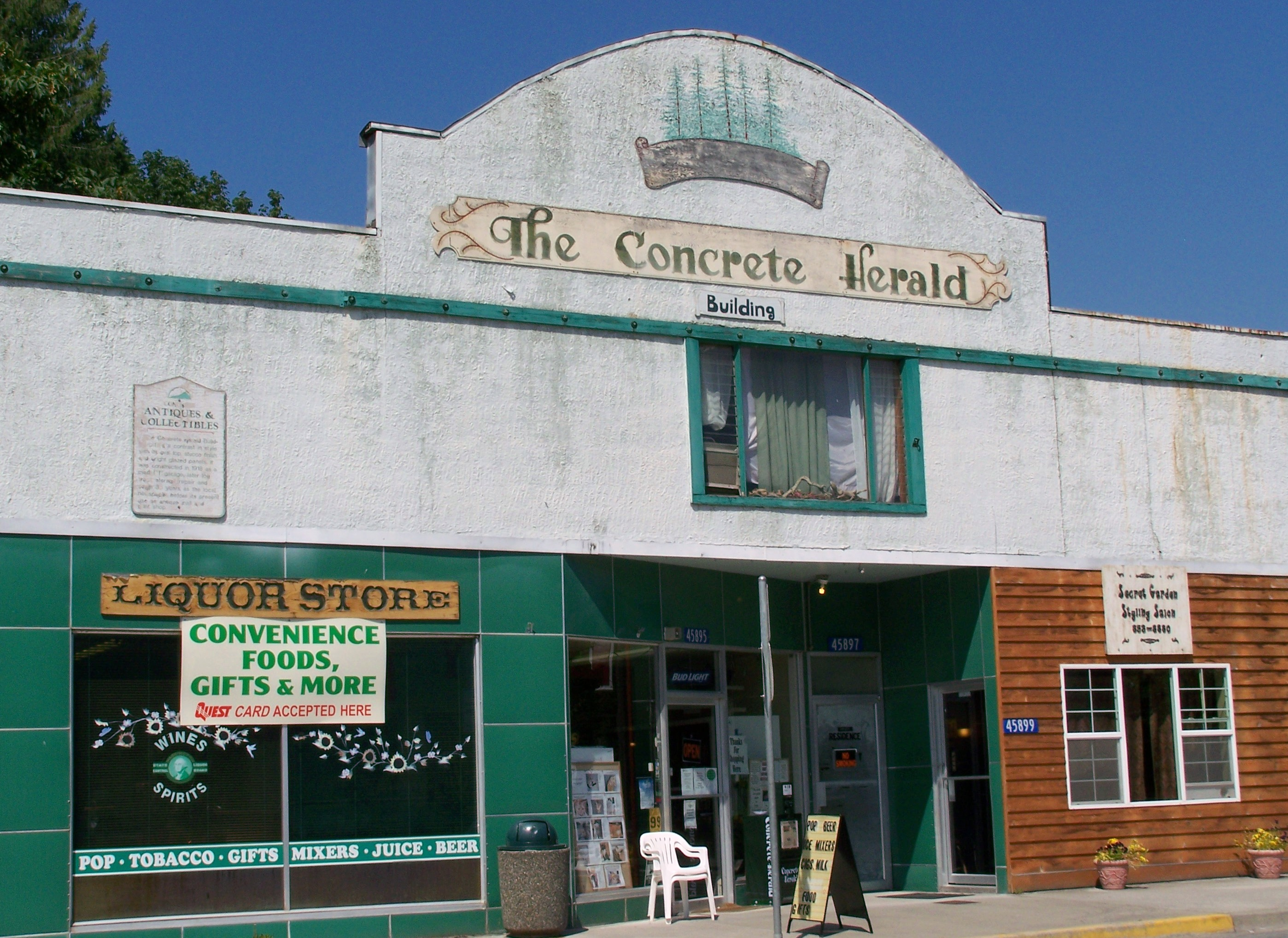
Concrete Herald Building

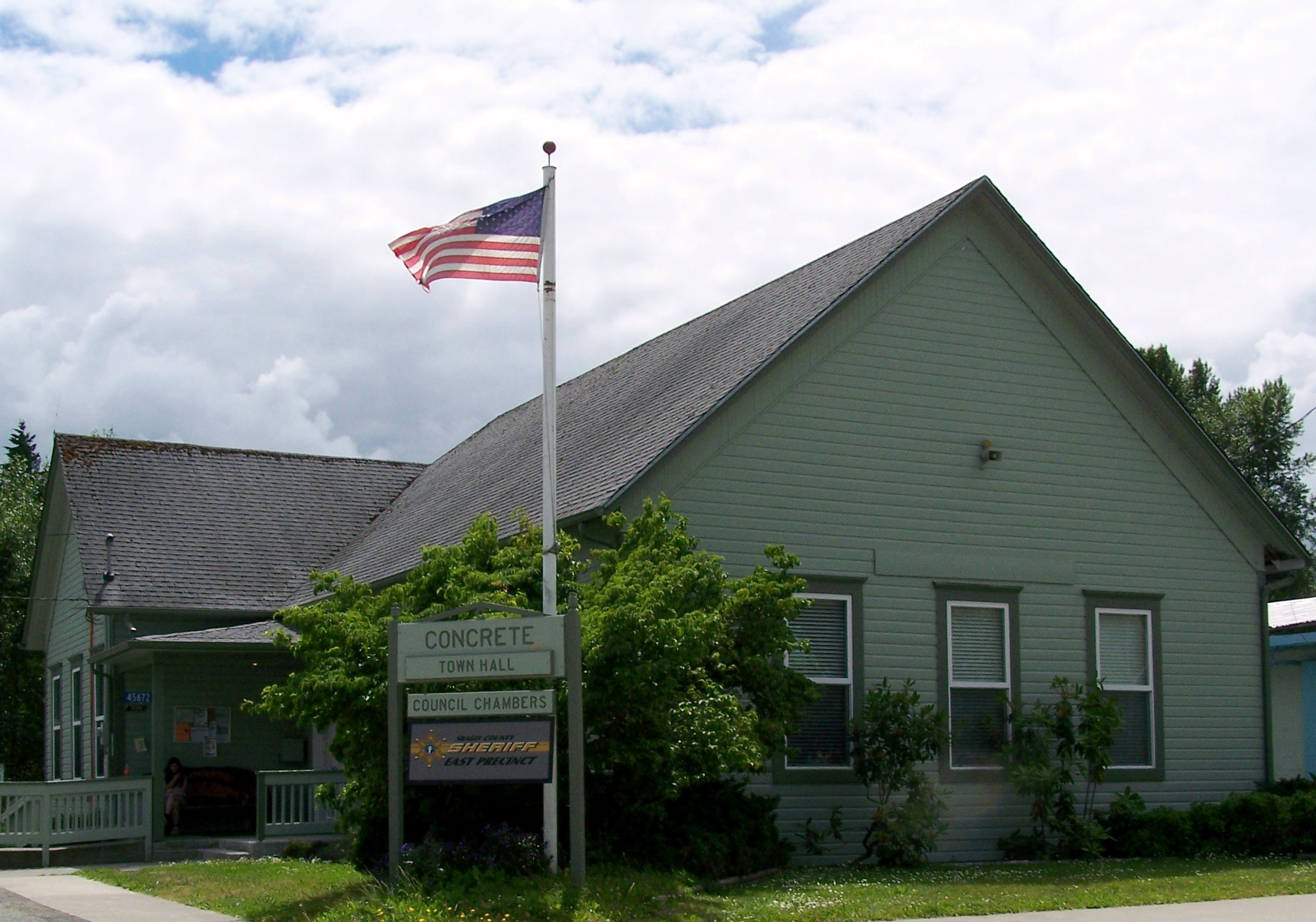
Concrete Town Hall

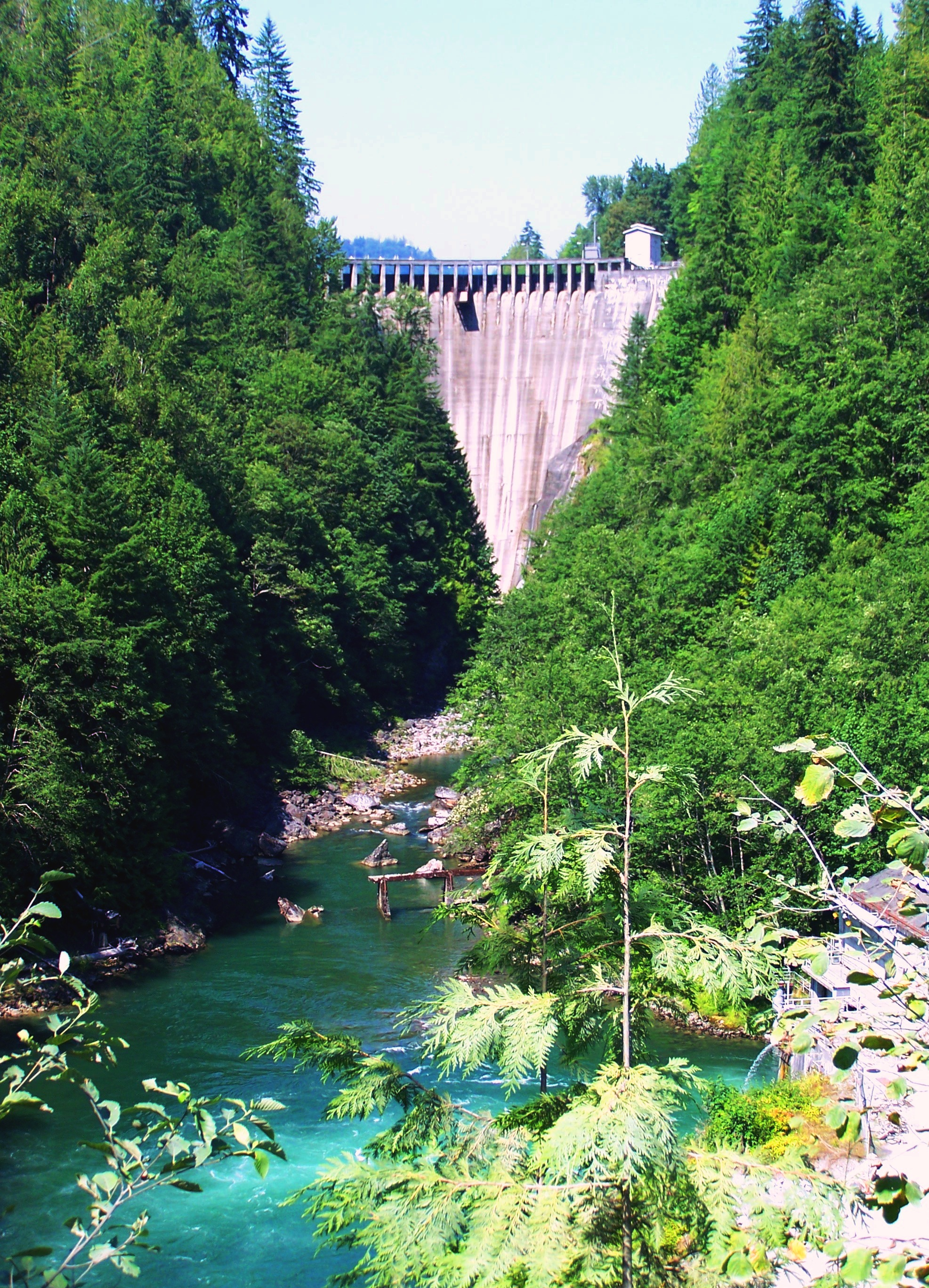
Lower Baker Dam

== Infrastructure ==
Mears Field (3W5), formerly known as Concrete Municipal Airport, is located one mile south of Concrete at an elevation of 267 ft MSL.
