= Skagit Valley Herald =

Newspaper in Washington state, US

- Type: Daily newspaper
- Format: Broadsheet
- Owner: Adams MultiMedia
- Founder: William C. Ewing
- Publisher: Skagit Valley Publishing Co.
- Founded: March 4, 1884; 142 years ago
- Headquarters: 1215 Anderson Road; Mount Vernon, WA 98274
- Country: United States
- Circulation: 8,774 (as of 2020)
- Sister newspapers: The Argus; Courier-Times; Anacortes American; Fidalgo This Week; Stanwood Camano News
- OCLC number: 17347816
- Website: goskagit.com

The Skagit Valley Herald is a daily newspaper serving Skagit County, Washington. It has a circulation of 8,774.

Skagit Valley Publishing also publishes the weekly Anacortes American, Fidalgo This Week, The Argus, Stanwood Camano News, and Courier-Times.

== History ==
The Skagit News was first published on March 4, 1884, as a weekly newspaper. It was founded William C. Ewing, the son of Thomas Ewing Jr. and grandson of Thomas Ewing. In 1885, George E. Hartson bought the paper. He went on to be elected mayor of Mount Vernon and serve as its postmaster while editing the News with his son Ralph E. Hartson. In January 1897, the News merged with the Skagit Valley News to form the News-Herald. The Hartson family sold the paper in 1907.

In 1916, Captain George Shorkley, Richard Bushell Jr. and Eugene Larin sold the paper to M. J. Beaumont of San Francisco. In 1922, it was renamed to the Mount Vernon Herald and transitioned to daily circulation.

In 1924, the paper's publisher M. J. Beaumont was assaulted in his office by monument maker D. Frets, who was upset about paper's criticisms on the work done on the cornerstone of the new courthouse. Beaumont in an editorial called it a "billboard cornerstone" and demanded it be removed because "a monument maker had been given the right to place his advertisement on the cornerstone."

Beaumont sold the paper in 1926 to Harry B. Averill. Averill published the paper for decades until selling it to brothers M. D. Glover and W. H. Glover Jr. in 1954. The paper's name was changed two years later to Skagit Valley Herald. The Glovers and others established the Herald-American Publishing Co. in 1961 to manage the Herald and Anacortes America, which was acquired by Skagit Valley Publishing Co. in 1964. This venture was affiliated with Scripps League Newspapers, which at the time had a controlling interest in Pioneer News Group. In 2017, Pioneer sold its papers to Adams Publishing Group.

Starting March 1, 2023, the paper transitioned from carrier to mail delivery. In 2026, unionized newsroom workers at the paper staged a one day strike to demand better wages and add limits to the use of artificial intelligence in the newsroom. A new contract was ratified a few months later with stipulations for increased pay and AI usage.
