= List of newspapers in Idaho =

This is a list of newspapers in the State of Idaho.

== Daily newspapers ==
Name	Location	Owner
Bonner County Daily Bee	Sandpoint	Hagadone Media Group
Coeur d'Alene Press	Coeur d'Alene	Hagadone Media Group
The Idaho Press	Nampa	Adams Publishing Group
Idaho State Journal	Pocatello	Adams Publishing Group
Lewiston Morning Tribune	Lewiston	A. L. (Butch) Alford Jr.
Moscow-Pullman Daily News	Moscow	A. L. (Butch) Alford Jr.
Post Register	Idaho Falls	Adams Publishing Group
Standard Journal	Rexburg	Adams Publishing Group
Times-News	Twin Falls	Lee Enterprises

== Non-daily newspapers ==
Name	Location	Owner	Frequency	Note
Aberdeen Times	Aberdeen		Weekly	
Arco Advertiser	Arco		Weekly	
Bingham News Chronicle	Blackfoot	Adams Publishing Group	Weekly	
Boise Weekly	Boise	Adams Publishing Group	Weekly	
Bonners Ferry Herald	Bonners Ferry	Hagadone Media Group	Weekly	
Challis Messenger	Challis	Adams Publishing Group	Weekly	
Clearwater Progress	Grangeville, Kamiah, Nez		Weekly	
Clearwater Tribune	Orofino		Weekly	
Council Record Reporter	Council		Weekly	
Emmett Messenger-Index	Emmett		Weekly	
Idaho County Free Press	Grangeville		Weekly	
Idaho Enterprise | Caribou County	Soda Springs		Weekly	
Idaho Statesman	Boise	The McClatchy Company	Triweekly	
Idaho Mountain Express	Ketchum		Weekly	
Idaho World	Idaho City		Weekly	
Jefferson Star	Rigby	Adams Publishing Group	Weekly	
The McCall Star-News	McCall	CherryRoad Media	Weekly	
Meridian-Kuna Press	Kuna	Adams Publishing Group	Weekly	
Montpelier News-Examiner	Montpelier	Adams Publishing Group	Weekly	
Mountain Home News	Mountain Home	Rust Communications	Weekly	
The Owyhee Avalanche	Homedale		Weekly	
The Power County Press	American Falls		Weekly	
Preston Citizen	Preston	Adams Publishing Group	Weekly	
Salmon Recorder-Herald	Salmon		Weekly	
Shoshone News Press	Osburn	Hagadone Media Group	Biweekly	
St. Maries Gazette-Record	St. Maries		Weekly	
Sandpoint Reader	Sandpoint		Weekly	
Teton Valley News	Driggs	Adams Publishing Group	Weekly	
Weiser Signal-American	Weiser		Weekly	

== Defunct newspapers ==
- Bingham County News (Blackfoot) (1918–1930)
- Blackfoot Optimist (1907–1918)
- Boise Valley Herald
- Camas Prairie Chronicle (Cottonwood) (1901–1917)
- Minidoka Irrigator
- South Idaho Press
- Topaz Times

== See also ==
- List of companies based in Idaho

Comprehensive

- Lists of newspapers
- List of newspapers in the United States

Frequency

- List of free daily newspapers in the United States
- List of weekly newspapers in the United States

Circulation

- List of international newspapers originating in the United States
- List of national newspapers in the United States
- List of newspapers in the United States by circulation

Foreign language

- List of French-language newspapers published in the United States
- List of German-language newspapers published in the United States
- List of Spanish-language newspapers published in the United States

Specialty

- List of African-American newspapers in the United States
- List of alternative weekly newspapers in the United States
- List of business newspapers in the United States
- List of family-owned newspapers in the United States
- List of Jewish newspapers in the United States
- List of LGBTQ periodicals in the United States
- List of student newspapers in the United States
- List of supermarket tabloids in the United States
- List of underground press in the United States

Other

- List of defunct newspapers of the United States
