= List of newspapers in Wyoming =

This is a list of newspapers in Wyoming, United States.

== Daily and weekly newspapers (currently published) ==
Newspaper	Area	Frequency	Publisher/parent company	Notes
Buffalo Bulletin	Buffalo, Wyoming	Weekly		
Carbon County Comet	Hanna, Wyoming	Weekly	C6 Press LLC	
Casper Star-Tribune	Casper, Wyoming	Daily until June 13, 2023, then Semi-Weekly	Lee Enterprises	
Cody Enterprise	Cody, Wyoming			
Douglas Budget	Douglas, Wyoming	Bi-weekly	Sage Publishing and Matt Adelman	
Gillette News-Record	Gillette, Wyoming	Every Tuesday and Saturday	Ann Kennedy Turner	
Green River Star	Green River, Wyoming	Weekly		
The Guernsey Gazette	Guernsey, Wyoming	Weekly	Wyoming Newspapers Inc.	
Jackson Hole News&Guide	Jackson, Wyoming	Daily	Kevin and Shelley Olson	
Kaycee Community Voice	Kaycee, Wyoming			
Lander Journal	Lander, Wyoming	Bi-weekly	Edwards Group	
Laramie Boomerang	Laramie, Wyoming			
Lovell Chronicle	Lovell, Wyoming			
The Lusk Herald	Lusk, Wyoming	Weekly	Wyoming Newspapers Inc.	
The Mini of Buffalo, Wyoming	Buffalo, Wyoming			
The Pinedale Roundup	Pinedale, Wyoming			
The Platte Co. Record-Times	Wheatland, Wyoming	Weekly	Wyoming Newspapers Inc.	
The Powell Tribune	Powell, Wyoming	Bi-weekly	Dave Bonner	
Riverton Ranger	Riverton, Wyoming	Bi-weekly	Edwards Group	
Rawlins Daily Times	Rawlins, Wyoming			
Rock Springs Daily Rocket-Miner	Rock Springs, Wyoming			
Sheridan Press	Sheridan, Wyoming			
The Torrington Telegram	Torrington, Wyoming	Bi-weekly	Wyoming Newspapers Inc.	
Wyoming Tribune Eagle	Cheyenne, Wyoming			

== Defunct newspapers ==
- Medicine Bow Post (1977-1995)

== See also ==
Comprehensive

- Lists of newspapers
- List of newspapers in the United States

Frequency

- List of free daily newspapers in the United States
- List of weekly newspapers in the United States

Circulation

- List of international newspapers originating in the United States
- List of national newspapers in the United States
- List of newspapers in the United States by circulation

Foreign language

- List of French-language newspapers published in the United States
- List of German-language newspapers published in the United States
- List of Spanish-language newspapers published in the United States

Specialty

- List of African-American newspapers in the United States
- List of alternative weekly newspapers in the United States
- List of business newspapers in the United States
- List of family-owned newspapers in the United States
- List of Jewish newspapers in the United States
- List of LGBTQ periodicals in the United States
- List of student newspapers in the United States
- List of supermarket tabloids in the United States
- List of underground press in the United States

Other

- List of defunct newspapers of the United States
