= List of newspapers in the United States =

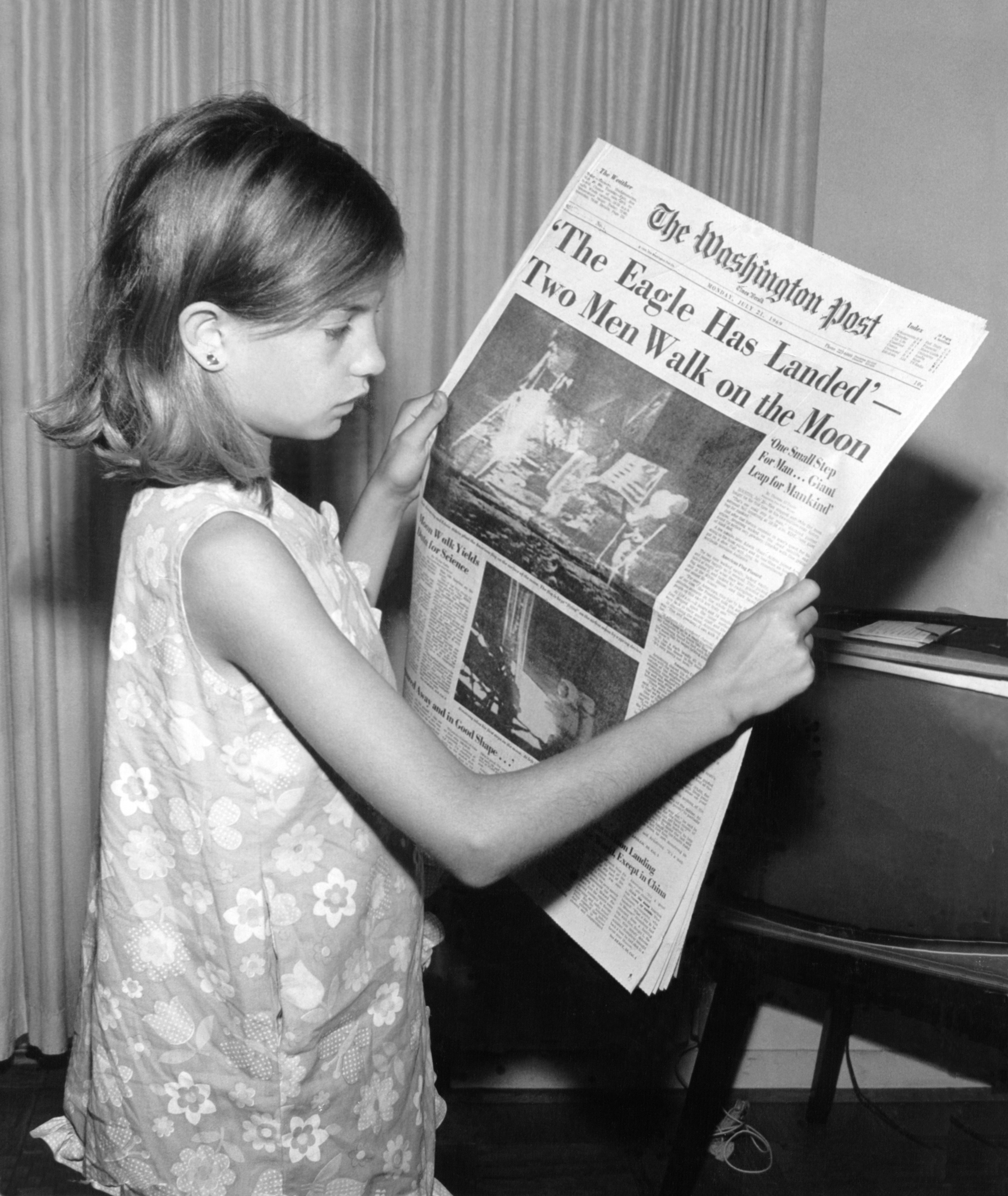
A girl holding a copy of The Washington Post, reporting the Apollo 11 Moon landing on July 21, 1969

As of 2026, the United States had 887 daily newspapers that were printed and distributed in the nation. Newspapers' audiences can be nationwide, regional, local, or focused on particular demographic groups and interests. While traditionally focused on printed publications, many major newspapers now have significantly more online subscribers than print readers.

== Top 10 newspapers by subscribers and print circulation ==
The following is a list of the top 10 newspapers in the United States by average weekday circulation and paid subscribers in 2023.

Newspaper	Primary service area(s)	Headquarters	Total	Digital subscribers	Print circulation	Founded	Owner	Nameplate
The New York Times	New York metro area, national, international	New York City	12,432,700	12,210,000	222,700	1851	The New York Times Company	
The Wall Street Journal	New York metro area, national, international	New York City	4,677,000	4,289,000	388,000	1889	News Corp	
The Washington Post	Washington metro area, national	Washington, D.C.	2,277,900	2,200,000	77,900	1877	Nash Holdings	
Los Angeles Times	Los Angeles metro area	El Segundo, California	301,900	243,000	58,900	1881	Nant Capital	
The Boston Globe	Boston metro area	Boston, Massachusetts	303,000	260,500	42,500	1872	Boston Globe Media	
USA Today	National	McLean, Virginia	224,812	142,212	82,600	1982	USA Today Co.	
Chicago Tribune	Chicago metro area	Chicago, Illinois	196,355	152,255	44,100	1847	Tribune Publishing Company	
The Minnesota Star Tribune	Twin Cities (Minneapolis–St. Paul)	Minneapolis, Minnesota	164,800	110,000	54,800	1867	Star Tribune Media Company	
Newsday	Long Island, New York	Melville, New York	109,400	47,000	62,400	1940	Newsday Media Group	
New York Post	New York metro area	New York City	112,400	—N/a	112,400	1801	News Corp	

== Longest-running newspapers ==
- The New Hampshire Gazette (1756)
- Hartford Courant (1764, the oldest continuously published newspaper in the United States)
- The Register Star (Hudson, New York, 1785)
- Poughkeepsie Journal (1785)
- The Augusta Chronicle (1785)
- Pittsburgh Post-Gazette (July 1786)
- Daily Hampshire Gazette (September 1784)
- The Berkshire Eagle (1789)
- The Daily Mail (Catskill, NY, 1792)
- The Recorder (1792)
- Intelligencer Journal (1794, now LNP)
- Rutland Herald (1794)
- Norwich Bulletin (1796)
- The Keene Sentinel (1799)
- New York Post (1801)
- The Post and Courier (1803)
- The Bedford Gazette (1805)
- Goshen Independent (1806)
- The Bourbon County Citizen (1807) (established as The Western Citizen, it is the oldest in the state of Kentucky)
- Press-Republican (April 12, 1811)
- The Repository (March 30, 1815) (established as The Ohio Repository, it is the oldest in the state of Ohio)
- The Fayetteville Observer (1816)
- Observer-Dispatch (1817)
- Arkansas Democrat-Gazette (1819)
- Woodville Republican (1824)
- Kennebec Journal (1825)
- Cherokee Phoenix (1828)
- Ledger-Enquirer (1828, founded as Columbus Enquirer)
- Star-Gazette (1828, founded as Elmira Gazette, the first newspaper of the now Gannett conglomerate)
- The Providence Journal (1829)
- The Post-Standard (1829)
- The Philadelphia Inquirer (1829, founded as The Pennsylvania Inquirer)
- The Stamford Advocate (1829, founded as The Stamford Intelligencer)
- The Barnstable Patriot (1830)
- Detroit Free Press (1831)
- New Yorker Staats-Zeitung (1834, oldest non-English newspaper, claims to be oldest that has never missed a publication date)
- The Blade (Toledo) (1835)
- The Taos News (El Crepúsculo de la Libertad) (1835)
- The Baltimore Sun (1837)
- The Times Picayune (1837, founded as The Picayune)
- The Mining Journal (1841)
- The Plain Dealer (1842)
- Boston Herald (1846)
- The Newport Daily News (1846)
- The Chicago Tribune (1847)
- The Daily Standard (Celina, Ohio, 1848)
- Taunton Daily Gazette (1848)
- The Santa Fe New Mexican (1849, the oldest continuously published newspaper in the Southwestern and Western United States)
- The Oregonian (1850)
- Deseret News (1850)
- Placerville Mountain Democrat (1851)
- Ellsworth American (1851)
- The New York Times (1851)
- The Express-Times (1855)
- The Florida Times-Union (1864, founded as The Florida Union)
- San Francisco Chronicle (1865)
- Parsons Sun (1871)
- The Detroit News (1873)
- The Daily Journal (New Jersey) (1875)
- The Daily Item (Lynn) (1877)
- The Washington Post (1877)

== United States newspapers by state and territory ==
List of lists of newspapers:

- Alabama
- Alaska
- American Samoa
- Arizona
- Arkansas
- California
- Colorado
- Connecticut
- Delaware
- Florida
- Georgia
- Guam
- Hawaii
- Idaho
- Illinois
- Indiana
- Iowa
- Kansas
- Kentucky
- Louisiana
- Maine
- Maryland
- Massachusetts
- Michigan
- Minnesota
- Mississippi
- Missouri
- Montana
- Nebraska
- Nevada
- New Hampshire
- New Jersey
- New Mexico
- New York
- North Carolina
- North Dakota
- Northern Mariana Islands
- Ohio
- Oklahoma
- Oregon
- Pennsylvania
- Puerto Rico
- Rhode Island
- South Carolina
- South Dakota
- Tennessee
- Texas
- US Virgin Islands
- Utah
- Vermont
- Virginia
- Washington
- Washington, D.C.
- West Virginia
- Wisconsin
- Wyoming

== Other lists of American newspapers ==
- List of free daily newspapers in the United States
- List of international newspapers originating in the United States
- List of national newspapers in the United States
- List of weekly newspapers in the United States

=== By specialty ===
- 19th-century newspapers that supported the Prohibition Party
- List of African American newspapers in the United States
- English-language press of the Socialist Party of America
- List of alternative weekly newspapers in the United States
- List of business newspapers in the United States
- List of family-owned newspapers in the United States
- List of Jewish newspapers in the United States
- List of LGBT periodicals in the United States
- List of student newspapers in the United States
- List of supermarket tabloids in the United States
- List of underground press in the United States
- Category:Asian-American press
- Category:Ethnic press in the United States

=== By language ===
- List of French-language newspapers published in the United States
- List of German-language newspapers published in the United States
- List of Spanish-language newspapers published in the United States

=== Defunct ===
- List of defunct newspapers of the United States

== See also ==
- Associated Press
- Lists of newspapers
- List of newspapers in the world by circulation
- List of newspapers in Canada
- List of historical societies in the United States
