= ISJ =

ISJ may refer to:

- Idaho State Journal, a newspaper in Pocatello, Idaho, U.S.
- International Socialism (magazine), published by the British Socialist Workers Party
- Investor Services Journal, a magazine for financial professionals
- International Committee in Search of Justice, a lobby led by Alejo Vidal-Quadras Roca in support of the National Council of Resistance of Iran
