= The Herald Journal =

Daily American newspaper

- The July 27, 2005 front page of The Herald Journal
- Type: Daily newspaper
- Format: Broadsheet
- Owner: Adams MultiMedia
- Editor: Andrew Weeks
- Founded: 1931
- Language: English
- Headquarters: 1068 W 130 S Logan, UT 84323-0487; United States
- Circulation: 5,524 (as of 2021)
- Website: hjnews.com

The Herald Journal is a newspaper in Logan, Utah, United States, and serves the Cache Valley area of Northern Utah and Southeastern Idaho which includes Cache County, Utah and Franklin County, Idaho. It is published three times each week and delivered via the mail on Tuesdays, Thursdays and Saturdays.

== History ==
On September 11, 1879, the first edition of the Logan Leader was published in Logan, Utah. Its first editor was Frank J. Cannon. On September 3, 1880, the paper was acquired by brothers Benjamin F. Cummings and Horace G. Cummings. The Cummings family sold their printing plant to a group of local businessmen who on August 1, 1882, relaunched the Leader as the Utah Journal. In 1885, ownership was consolidated among John P. Smith, John E. Carlisle, and E.A. Stratford. By 1886, the paper claimed a circulation of 1,000.

In 1889, Robert "Bob" W. Sloan bought out Carlisle and Stratford. He then operated the paper with Smith and renamed it to the Logan Journal. In 1890, Smith withdrew from the firm. In 1891, Sloan was arrested and charged with voter intimidation. A year later Sloan sold paper to a group of businessmen, who renamed it to The Journal. The group ran the paper for about three years and then leased it to Charles England and Jesse Earl, who then acquired ownership by 1900.

In December 1925, Ralph R. Channell, owner of the Smithfield Sentinel, and Jake A. Wahlen, owner of the South Cache Courier of Hyrum, joined forces to launch the semiweekly Cache Valley Herald in Logan, making it a competitor to the Journal. The Courier was merged into the Sentinel at that time. In February 1926, Clyde F. Settle launched a new paper in Hyrum called the South Cache Citizen.

In July 1926, Ralph R. Channell sold his half stake in the Herald to Leslie T. Foy. Wahlen maintained his interest, but dissolved the partnership and sold out to Foy later that year. Wahlen left so he could revive the Citizen which had suspended publication several months prior. He then renamed it back to the Courier.

In 1928, Scripps-Canfiled, an affiliate of Scripps League Newspapers, purchased the Herald from Foy and expanded it into a daily paper. In 1931, Scripps purchased the Logan Journal from Earl and England, and then merged it with the Daily Herald to form the Daily Herald Journal. In December 1975, Pioneer Newspapers spun off from Scripps and took the Herald Journal with it. In 2017, Pioneer News Group sold its papers to Adams Publishing Group. Two years later the paper decreased its print editions from five a week to three.

== Circulation ==
In early 2014, The Herald Journal had a daily circulation of about 16,215, but by 2021 had declined to 5,524 as the paper switched to weekly print publication.

== Staff ==
As of 2019, The Herald Journal's general manager is Ben Kenfield, who replaced David Welsh, publisher and president since 2016. Its managing editor is Andrew Weeks.
