= Stephen P. Moss =

American politician

- Oregon state legislator Stephen Moss

Member of the Oregon House of Representatives from the 22nd (1882) and 28th (1889) district
- In office 1882 and 1889
- Preceded by: O. A. Stearns (1882 term); Robert McLean (1889 term)
- Succeeded by: Uriah F. Abshier (1882 term); A. Snider (1889 term)
- Constituency: Klamath and Lake counties

Personal details
- Born: June 24, 1840 Peoria, Illinois, US
- Died: May 17, 1917 (aged 76) Lakeview, Oregon
- Party: Democratic
- Profession: Businessman and rancher

Stephen Pike Moss (June 24, 1840 – May 17, 1917) was a rancher, businessman, and state legislator from the state of Oregon. He was a Democrat who served two terms in the Oregon House of Representatives. In the house, Moss represented a very large rural district in south central Oregon. He was also a co-founder of the Lake County Examiner, a newspaper published in Lakeview, Oregon.

== Early life ==
Moss was born in Peoria, Illinois on June 24, 1840, the son of Micajah and Sara Moss. His father was a farmer. Moss grew up and was educated in Peoria until the age of twelve when he moved with his family to Linn County, Oregon. He lived in Linn County for sixteen years where he became a farmer. In 1856, Moss enlisted as a private in Company C of the Oregon Rangers volunteer militia battalion. He served a three-month tour in the John Day River country in north central Oregon before returning to Linn County.

Moss married Sarah Robnett in 1861; however, she died in 1868. Shortly after her death, Moss sold his farm and relocated to Big Valley, California, where he becoming a stockman. In 1870, he married Margaret Casteel. In 1872, Moss moved his family back to Oregon. They settled on a stock ranch in the Chewaucan Valley southeast of Paisley in Lake County. Over time, Moss became a successful rancher. Later, he was a partner in a sawmill near New Pine Creek south of Lakeview.

== Lake County politics ==
Moss was very active in civic affairs. He was a progressive Democrat who believed in grass-roots Jeffersonian democracy. In 1875, he was elected justice of the peace for the Chewaucan Valley area. A year later, Moss was elected Lake County commissioner.

In 1880, Moss joined another prominent Lake County Democrat, Charles A. Cogswell, to start a newspaper in Lakeview; their newspaper, the Lake County Examiner, was created in response to the State Line Herald, another local newspaper that actively advocated Republican political views. While the Examiner advocated a Democratic point of view, its front page often featured short fiction stories and anecdotes rather than actual news. Initially, the two rival newspapers battled vigorously with opposing political editorials. In 1881, James H. Evans acquired the Herald and a year later he bought the Examiner. Evans merged the two newspapers under the Examiner name, but kept the Herald’s Republican editorial viewpoint.

== State representative ==
In 1882, Moss ran for the District 22 seat in the Oregon House of Representatives as a Democrat. He beat his Republican opponent by 88 votes, 316 to 228. District 22 was a large rural district in south central Oregon covering all of Lake County (which at that time, also included what is now Klamath County). The size of the legislative district was over 14,000 square miles (36,000 km^{2}). Moss took his seat in the Oregon House on September 11, 1882 and served through the regular legislative session which ended on 19 October. During the session, Moss served as a member of the House internal improvements and assessments committees. Among his peers, he was known as a quiet and thoughtful member of the House. Moss did not run for re-election in 1884.

In 1889, Moss decided to run again for a seat in the legislature. The state had realigned House districts so he ran in District 28 which represented both Lake and Klamath counties. While District 28 represented two counties, Klamath County had just been separated from Lake County so it was essentially the same district Moss had represented in 1882. Once again, he won a seat in the legislature, defeating Republican S. J. Studley, by a vote of 380 to 321. This allowed him to serve in the regular legislative session which opened on January 14, 1889, and lasted through 22 February. During the session, he served on the ways and means and counties committees. Moss did not run for re-election in 1890.

== Politics and business ==
After the 1889 legislative session ended, Governor Sylvester Pennoyer appointed Moss to the Southern Oregon State Board of Agriculture. In the early 1890s, Governor Pennoyer left the Democratic Party and joined the People's Party. Moss made the same move, becoming the leader of the People's Party in Lake County. In 1894, Governor Pennoyer appointed Moss to the position of county judge for Lake County. Two year later, Moss was selected as a People's Party delegate to the state convention.

Eventually, Moss became an advocate for merging the People's Party back into the Democratic Party. In 1898, he joined Doctor Bernard Daly, Lake County's leading Democrat, to host a local convention to merge the two parties at the county level. At the county convention, delegates agreed to maintain separate parties, but to jointly nominate candidate for county positions. The People's Party was allowed to nominate the county judge, clerk, treasurer, and coroner. The Democratic Party was authorized to nominate candidates for commissioner, sheriff, assessor, school superintendent, and surveyor. Moss was also one of six county delegates selected to attend a state convention, planned to negotiate a state level merger of the parties. In 1898 election, Moss ran for county judge as the Fusion Party (merged Democrat-Peoples party) candidate, but lost to the republican by 100 votes.

After returning to the Democratic Party, Moss continued to be active in local politics. In 1902, he was chairman of Lake County's Democratic convention and was selected as a delegate to state and national conventions. Two years later, he was once again selected as a delegate to state and national Democratic conventions. By that time, he was also a member of the Democratic Party's state central committee in Oregon, a position he retained for a number of years.

In the meantime, Moss lobbied the state legislature on behalf of Oregon's military veterans who were still owed pensions and back pay. In 1856, volunteers were promised $2 per day, but were only paid 55 cents. As a result, Oregon veterans were owed an average $118 for their service. Moss was a leading advocate for a state appropriation to cover that obligation. Moss also continued to expand his business interest in Lakeview and throughout Lake County. He was on the board of director for the First National Bank of Lakeview and the Lake County Loan and Savings Bank. In 1910, Moss helped found the Chewaucan Mercantile Company. The purpose of the firm was to conduct general mercantile business in the Paisley area. The company was capitalized with $40,000 from eight shareholders, including Moss. Moss became a company director and was elected vice president of the company's board. He was also an advocate for bringing the Nevada–California–Oregon Railway to Paisley. In 1911, he was one of the Lake County businessmen who hosted railroad executives on a tour of the proposed route.

== Later life ==
In 1912, Moss became ill with blood poisoning. The illness required him to travel to San Francisco for treatment. He was hospitalized there for six weeks, but recovered and returned home. After he recovered, Moss continued to serve on the bank boards and remained active in Democratic politics. In 1912, he founded the Wilson and Marshall Progressive Democratic League of Lakeview, Oregon. The organization was affiliated with Progressive Democratic League of Oregon and Federation of Democratic Clubs of the United States.

Moss died on May 17, 1917, in Lakeview, Oregon. He was almost 77 years old. He was buried at the Odd Fellows cemetery in Lakeview. At the time of his death, Moss owned over 5,000 acres (2,000 ha) of ranch land along with a large herd of sheep, some cattle, and about 50 horses. His estate also included town property in Lakeview as well as bank stock. Overall, his estate was valued at $166,000. The estate was divided equally between his wife and seven children as directed in his will.
