= Bozeman Daily Chronicle =

Daily newspaper in Bozeman, Montana

- Type: Daily newspaper
- Owner: Adams MultiMedia
- Founder: S.W. Langhorne
- Founded: 1883
- Language: English
- Headquarters: Bozeman, Montana
- Circulation: 8,648 (as of 2021)
- Sister newspapers: Belgrade News
- Website: bozemandailychronicle.com

The Bozeman Daily Chronicle is a daily newspaper published in Bozeman, Montana.

== History ==
In 1883, The Weekly Chronicle was first published by Sam W. Langhorne in Bozeman, Montana. Later that year it expanded into a daily and relaunched as the Bozeman Daily Chronicle. It was soon purchased by A.K. Yerkes. Charles S. Fell became a co-owner in 1891.

The two men sold the Chronicle in 1899 to David Marks on behalf of undisclosed buyers for $11,000. The new owner was later revealed to be businessman Marcus Daly, who had also recently acquired the Livingston Enterprise. Daly died in November 1900. His estate sold the Chronicle two years later to William McClure Bole, who had edited the paper for the past two years and previously worked at the Great Falls Tribune.

Bole and Oliver Sherman Warden purchased the Great Falls Tribune in 1905 and sold his Bozeman paper in 1907. Decades later Bole was inducted into the Montana Newspaper Hall of Fame. The new Chronicle owners were Bole's brother James P. Bole and H.W. Howard. J.P. Bole published the Chronicle until his death in 1940.

In 1946, Jefferson and M.C. Jones acquired the paper, and then sold it in 1954 to the Scripps League Newspapers. After the sale, Jones. G. Nicholas Ifft III was named general manager. Pioneer Newspapers split off from Scripps in 1975 and took the Chronicle with it. In 2017, the company sold all of its papers to Adams Publishing Group. In 2021, editorial staff at the paper formed a union called the Yellowstone News Guild.

== Content ==
It is noted by many of its residents and non-residents to have an entertaining Police Reports section, which includes "many minor crimes of a more humorous or absurd nature". In 2011, they published a book, We Don't Make This Stuff Up, a compilation of over 30 years of some of these crimes.
