= Herald and News =

Daily newspaper published in Klamath Falls, Oregon

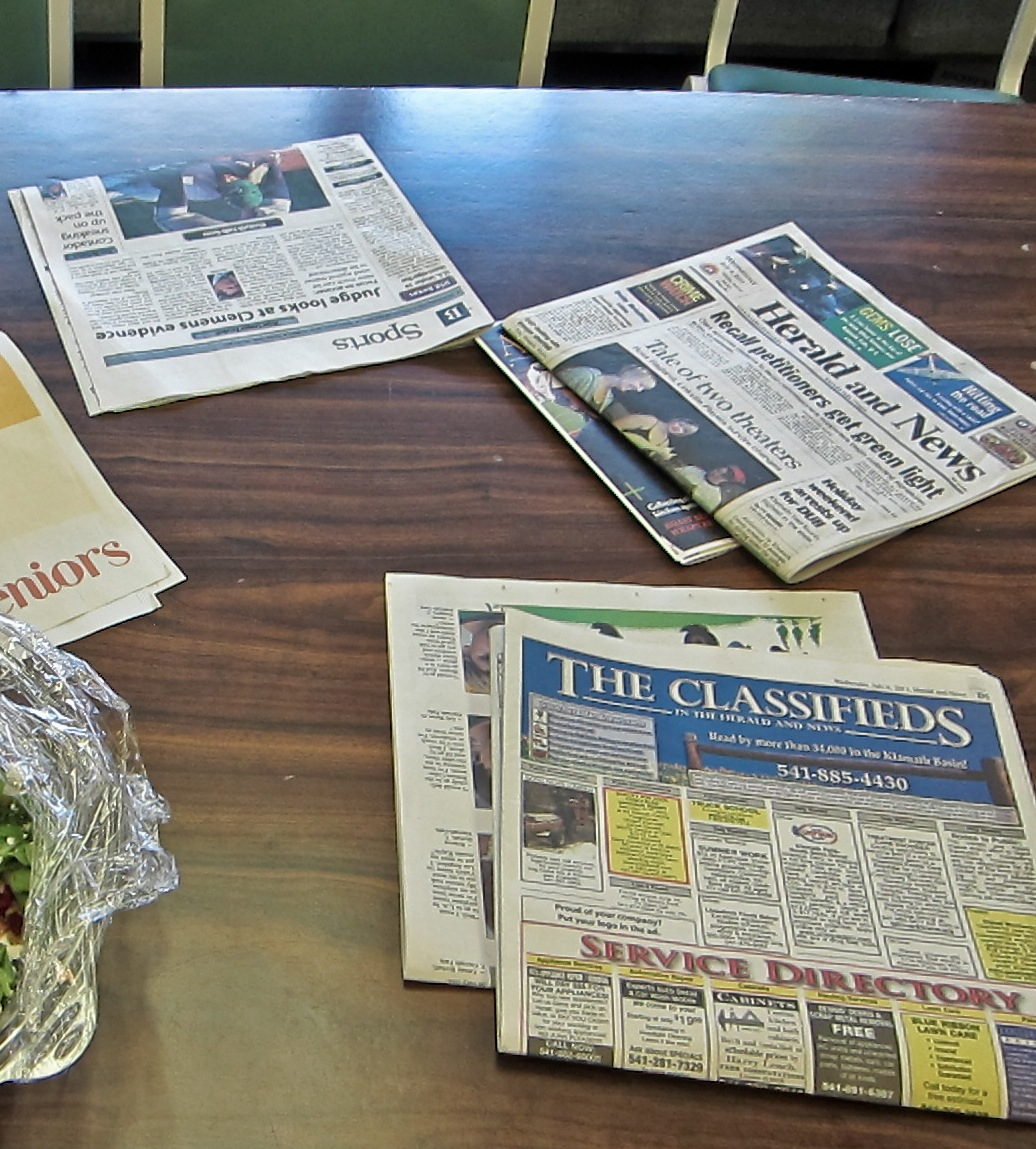
- Herald and News sections
- Type: Daily newspaper
- Format: Berliner
- Owner: Adams MultiMedia
- Publisher: Michael Distelhorst
- Editor: Gene Warnick
- Founded: June 1, 1942
- Language: English
- Headquarters: Herald and News; 2701 Foothills Blvd. Klamath Falls, Oregon 97603
- Circulation: 5,800 (as of 2021)
- Sister newspapers: Lake County Examiner
- Website: heraldandnews.com

The Herald and News is a twice weekly newspaper serving the city of Klamath Falls and Klamath County in the U.S. state of Oregon. It also distributes east into Lake County. The General Manager is Joe Hudon and the editor is Gene Warnick. The morning paper is published four days a week, skipping Mondays, Thursdays, and Saturdays.

== History ==
The Evening Herald was founded in 1906 by Fred Cronemiller and his family, who later moved to Lakeview, Oregon. Wesley O. Smith and E. J. Murray purchased the paper in 1908, and expanded its size. By one account, Murray sold the paper to F. R. Soule in 1922; by another, after having bought Smith's share, he sold it to Bruce Dennis, who had an extensive history as a newspaper owner in the state, in 1926. The Klamath News launched in 1923. In 1927, Dennis purchased the News. He then sold both papers to Frank Jenkins, Ernest Gilstrap, and Eugene Kelty (all formerly of the Eugene Register; they formed an association known as the Southern Oregon Publishing Company) in 1931. Kelty soon withdrew.

The two papers were merged to form the Herald and News as a result of wartime newsprint rationing; the first issue of the combined publication was published June 1, 1942. Frank Jenkins sold the newspaper in 1960 to Scripps League Newspapers. In 1975, the company split off eleven of its daily newspapers including the Herald and News to form a new company called Pioneer Newspapers, Inc., which in 2013 was renamed to Pioneer News Group. In 2017, Pioneer sold its papers to Adams Publishing Group.

In March 2022, all four of the newspapers' editorial workers quit in the same month. Adams said it would rely on freelancers until they hired new staff. In December that same year, the paper decreased it's print schedule from four to two days a week.
