= Pioneer News Group =

American media company (1974-2017)

- Status: Defunct
- Founded: 1974
- Country of origin: United States
- Headquarters location: Seattle, Washington
- Publication types: Newspapers
- Owner: Scripps family
- Official website: pioneernewsgroup.com

Pioneer News Group was an American media company. The company was founded in 1974 and headquartered in Seattle, Washington. It was owned by the Scripps family, who had also started the E. W. Scripps Company. The Pioneer News Groups had printing facilities in Idaho, Montana, Utah, Oregon, and Washington. In October 2017, Pioneer announced that it was selling its newspaper business to the Adams Publishing Group.

== History ==
In December 1975, Scripps League Newspapers spun off a number of numbers to form a new company called Pioneer Newspapers, Inc. The enterprise would be owned and operated by James George Scripps, who was the brother of Scripps League chairman Edward W. Scripps and grandson of E. W. Scripps. The newspapers included were: Grass Valley Union, Caldwell News-Tribune, The Idaho Press, Idaho State Journal, The Bemidji Pioneer, Bozeman Daily Chronicle, Havre Daily News, Herald and News, Canonsburg Notes, Monongahela Herald, Waynesburg Democrat Messenger, The Herald Journal, Skagit Valley Herald.

Other newspaper companies affiliated with Pioneer in 1976 were Kalb Newspapers, the Scripps-Ifft group, the Scripps-Wood group and Swift Newspapers. In January 1982, Pioneer Newspapers merged with Swift Newspapers, owned by Philip E, Swift, to form Swift-Pioneer Newspapers, Inc. In October 1982, the Lander Journal was acquired.

In May 1983, Scripps-Ifft Newspapers, Inc., owned by Nicholas Ifft, sold the Bozeman Chronicle, Havre Daily News and Idaho State Journal to Swift-Pioneer. A few months later Swift-Pioneer also bought the Seaside Signal, Tillamook Headlight-Herald and The News Guard from Scripps-Ifft.

Company founder James George Scripps died in December 1986. Swift-Pioneer acquired the Record-Courier in 1988. Around this time Swift and Pioneer began operating separately, with Swift based in Carson City, Nevada and Pioneer based in Seattle, Washington. Pioneer took the papers in Idaho, Montana, southern Oregon and Washington, while Swift took the rest.

In 1990, Pioneer Newspapers repurchased the stock owned by Sally Scripps Weston and her daughter Marion S. Weston, heirs of the late J.G. Scripps. This left Scripps' other daughter, Susan Scripps Wood, and her family as majority company owner.

In the years that followed Pioneer acquired the Daily Record in 1996, Lone Peak Lookout in 1998 and the Standard Journal and Fremont County Herald-Chronicle in 2000. Pioneer launched the Belgrade News in 2004. The company sold the Havre Daily News and purchased the Teton Valley News in 2005. Pioneer purchased the Preston Citizen, the Tremonton Leader and News-Examiner in 2007.

In 2013, the company was renamed to Pioneer News Group. In January 2015, the company purchased the Stanwood Camano News. In December 2015, company owner Susan Wood died, leaving her husband Leighton P. Wood in charge. In October 2017, Pioneer sold its 22 newspapers to Adams Publishing Group.

== Publications owned in 2017 ==
- Anacortes American in Anacortes, Washington
- The Argus in Mount Vernon, Washington
- Belgrade News in Belgrade, Montana
- Bozeman Daily Chronicle in Bozeman, Montana
- Courier-Times in Mount Vernon, Washington
- The Daily Record in Ellensburg, Washington
- Fidalgo This Week in Anacortes, Washington
- Herald and News in Klamath Falls, Oregon
- The Herald Journal in Logan, Utah
- The Idaho Press-Tribune in Nampa, Idaho
- Idaho State Journal in Pocatello, Idaho
- Lake County Examiner in Lakeview, Oregon
- The Leader in Tremonton, Utah
- Meridian Press in Meridian, Idaho
- Messenger Index in Emmett, Idaho
- News-Examiner in Montpelier, Idaho
- The Nickel in Klamath Falls, Oregon
- Preston Citizen in Preston, Idaho
- Skagit Valley Herald in Mount Vernon, Washington
- Standard Journal in Rexburg, Idaho
- Stanwood Camano News in Stanwood, Washington
- Teton Valley News in Driggs, Idaho
- Kuna Melba News in Kuna, Idaho
