= Sandpoint Reader =

- Type: Alternative weekly
- Founder(s): Zach Hagadone; John Reuter; Chris DeCleur
- Publisher: Ben Olson
- Editor: Zach Hagadone
- Staff writers: Soncirey Mitchell
- Founded: 2004
- Language: English
- Headquarters: 111 Cedar Street, Suite 9 Sandpoint, ID 83864
- Circulation: 4,000
- Website: sandpointreader.com

Sandpoint Reader is an alternative weekly newspaper published in Sandpoint, Idaho, providing local news, cultural and entertainment coverage. It is distributed free in Bonner County, Idaho and Boundary County, Idaho.

== History ==
The Sandpoint Reader was founded in December 2004 by Zach Hagadone, John Reuter and Chris DeCleur. The three met while working at The Coyote, the student newspaper at Albertson College, and started the Reader shortly after graduating. The paper suspended publication in 2012 after the last of the founders moved away from Sandpoint.

After a near three-year hiatus, the Reader was relaunched in January 2015. Publisher Ben Olson resurrected the paper in partnership Keokee Publishing. At that time Cameron Rasmusson was named editor. In 2019, Zach Hagadone returned to the Reader and succeeded Rasmusson as editor after previously working for four years as Boise Weekly editor.

In March 2020, Olson laid off all staff at the start of the COVID-19 recession in the United States. The paper was able to temporarily rehire the three employees with money donated from readers and funds from the Paycheck Protection Program.

== Notable stories ==
In 2017 the Reader produced an eight-week series of in-depth articles and profiles on the American Redoubt with support from the Idaho Press Club.

An investigation in late 2017 by the Reader led to the first public identification of a neo-Nazi activist, Scott Rhodes, who was distributing racist and anti-semitic literature locally and making robocalls targeting high-profile events and political races nationally. The Reader in 2018 was subsequently targeted in harassing and threatening calls, videos and letters. National media including the Washington Post, New York Times and others carried stories on the robocaller after the Reader broke the story. In January 2021, the FCC levied a $9.9 million fine on Rhodes for illegally using caller ID spoofing in making thousands of calls targeting communities with harmful recorded messages.
