= Uriah F. Abshier =

American politician (1849–1934)

Member of the Oregon House of Representatives from the 22nd district
- In office 1885–1886
- Preceded by: Stephen P. Moss
- Succeeded by: Robert McLean

Personal details
- Born: September 17, 1849 White County, Illinois, US
- Died: May 23, 1934 (aged 84) Glenn County, California, US
- Party: Republican
- Profession: Postmaster and businessman

Uriah Francis Abshier (September 17, 1849 – May 23, 1934) was a state legislator from the state of Oregon. He served one two-year term in the Oregon House of Representatives as a Republican legislator, representing a large rural district in south-central Oregon. He was the postmaster for Silver Lake, Oregon and owned ranch property near that town. Later, he ran a hardware store in Centerville, Washington.

== Early life ==
Abshier was born in White County, Illinois, on September 17, 1849, the son of Joel M. Abshier and Margaret (Miller) Abshier. As a young man, sometime before 1868, he moved west, settling in Colusa County, California. After arriving in California, he made his living as a farmer. He continued farming in that area for at least four years.

Sometime between 1873 and 1875, Abshier moved north to Oregon, settling in Silver Lake in Lake County. After arriving in Oregon, he worked as a stockman.

While in Silver Lake, Abshier became active in local politics. In 1881, he was appointed to the position of Lake County commissioner after the elected commissioner resigned from the post. A year later, the county Democratic convention selected Abshier as the party's candidate for county commissioner. Abshier was elected to the county commissioner position in the 1882 general election, defeating three other candidates. In that election, Abshier received 360 votes while J. B. Phelps (another Democrat) ran second with 304 votes with Republican, P. G. Chrisman, receiving 247. There was also an independent candidate who received two votes.

== State Legislature ==
In 1884, Abshier decided to run for a seat in the state legislature as a Republican. He was nominated for the District 22 seat in the Oregon House of Representatives, representing Lake and Klamath counties in rural south-central Oregon. Abshier won the House seat in the 1884 general election.

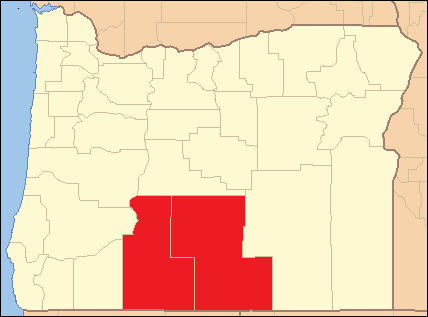
Oregon House District 22, 1885–1886

Abshier took his seat in the Oregon House on January 12, 1885, representing District 22. At that time, Klamath County had just been separated from Lake County, so some documents show District 22 representing only Lake County and others show the district representing both Lake and Klamath counties. In reality, the boundary of District 22 did not change since Klamath County was originally part of Lake County and remained part of District 22 after the counties were separated. Abshier served through the 1895 regular legislative session which ended on February 21. During the short six-week session, he served on the assessment and taxation committee. He also introduced a bill to set a standard salary of county treasurers.

Later that year, the Oregon legislature was recalled for a special session. The special session began on November 11 and lasted through November 24. Abshier served through that session as well. During the session, he introduced one of the assembly's most important bills. His bill proposed that the Warner Valley be separated from Grant County and be attached to Lake County. The rationale for the change was simple and persuasive. The Warner Valley was 230 miles (370 km) from Canyon City (the Grant County seat) while it was only 30 miles (48 km) from Lakeview (the Lake County seat). The Oregon legislature agreed and passed the bill, enlarging Lake County by about 20 percent. During the session, he also sponsored a bill to donate 20 acres of state land to the city of Linkville (now Klamath Falls, Oregon) for a cemetery.

== Postmaster and rancher ==
After the close of the 1885 special session, Abshier returned to Silver Lake. In 1886, the local post office was moved from an outlying ranch into the town of Silver Lake and Abshier was appointed postmaster. He held the position of postmaster through 1891. During that same time period, he also began operating the official Silver Lake weather station.

On September 28, 1887, Abshier married Judah Joan Harlow. The wedding was held at her family home in Lane County near Eugene, Oregon. Together they had one son.

In the early 1890s, Abshier filed three land grant claims in the valley north of Silver Lake. The first was a 240 acres (97 ha) property claimed under the Desert Land Act. He patented that land claim in 1890. The second parcel was a 160 acres (65 ha) homestead claim, patented in 1893. The third land grant was for a 160 acres (65 ha) timber culture claim, which was patented two years later.

Abshier also remained active in local politics and government affairs. In 1892, Abshier was elected to the position of Lake County assessor as a Democrat, beating the Republican candidate, C. S. Benefiel, 481 votes to 208. Two years later, Lake County's Democratic convention nominated Abshier to run as its candidate for county clerk, but he was defeated by the Republican, William A. Massingill. In that election, Abshier got 219 votes against 388 for Massingall with a People's Party candidate, J. S. McLaughlin, receiving 136 votes.

On Christmas Eve 1894, Silver Lake experienced a great tragedy. That evening virtually the entire town's population of 50 inhabitants along with another 150 people from ranches in the surrounding valley had gathered in the local community center to celebrate the Christmas holiday. During the entertainment program, an oil lamp hanging from the ceiling was bumped and spilled its contents, starting a fire in the crowded hall. The room was on the second floor with only one door and two small windows for escape. In the fire and panic that followed, 43 people were killed and an additional forty severely burned. Abshier was able to rescue his five-year-old son from the blaze; however, his wife was playing the organ on the far side of the room and was unable to escape the flames. She perished in the fire. Abshier never remarried, remaining a widower for the next 40 years. At the time, the fire was reported in newspapers throughout the United States. Even today, details of the tragedy are periodically recounted in media articles.

== Businessman and farmer ==
In 1903, Abshier moved to Washington state, settling in Centerville in Klickitat County, just north of the Columbia River. After arriving in Centerville, Abshier opened a hardware store. The store stocked a complete line of tools and hardware. He also sold farm equipment and horse harnesses as well as buggies and large Conestoga wagons. A few years after opening the store, he took one of his employees, William F. Niva, as a partner. After that, the company was known as Abshier & Niva. Abshier also became active in community affairs. In 1904, he was elected to the Centerville school board.

When the Spokane, Portland and Seattle Railway reached Centerville, Abshier & Niva began operating a grain warehouse and two loading docks at the Centerville railroad station. Originally, the company filled gondola cars from their loading docks with each car carrying 250 grain sacks. However, when the railroad was expanded to standard gage the railroad began using boxcars that carried 650 sacks per car. As a result, the company's grain shipping business grew quickly. In 1908, Abshier & Niva's grain warehouse joined the Portland Board of Trade (a predecessor organization of the chamber of commerce).

In 1916, a fire destroyed most of downtown Centerville including the Abshier & Niva hardware store. After the fire, Abshier rebuilt his store using brick instead of lumber to make the new structure fire resistant. As a result, the building was still in place 70 years later.

In 1920, Abshier left Centerville and moved back to California, settling near Orland. For the next 14 years he operated a fruit farm in the Loam Ridge area of Glenn County.

Abshier was killed on May 23, 1934, in an automobile accident near Hamilton City, California. The accident occurred while he was returning from a fishing trip. He was 84 years old at the time of his death. His funeral was held three days later on May 26, 1934. The funeral service included Masonic rites, officiated by the Colusa Masonic lodge, where Abshier was a founding member. Following the service, his body was taken to Sacramento for cremation.
