= Medicine Bow, Wyoming =

- Town
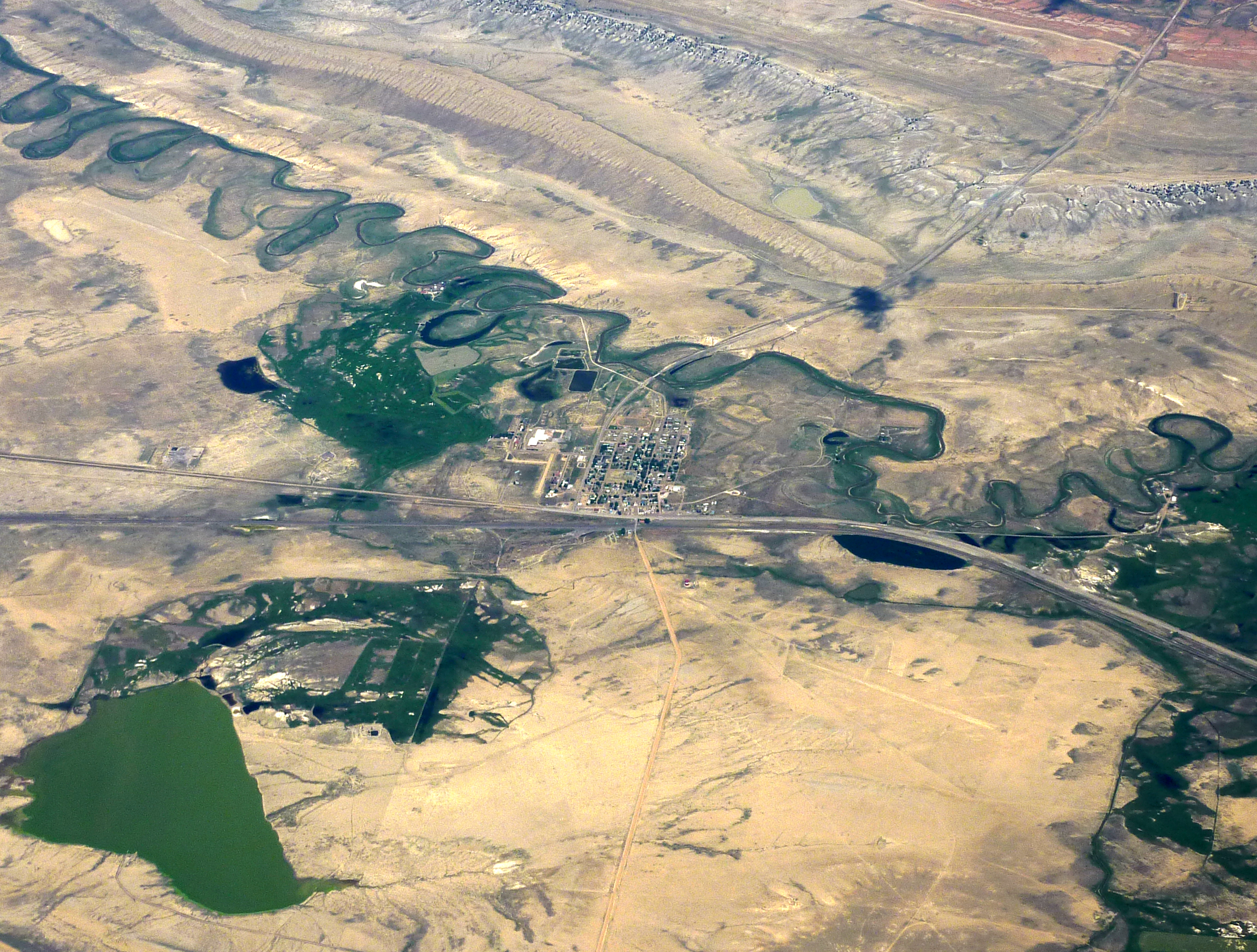
- Aerial view of Medicine Bow and surrounding area

- Location of Medicine Bow in Carbon County, Wyoming
- Coordinates: 41°53′58″N 106°12′07″W
- Country: United States
- State: Wyoming
- County: Carbon

Area
  - Total: 3.46 sq mi (8.96 km^{2})
  - Land: 3.46 sq mi (8.96 km^{2})
  - Water: 0 sq mi (0.00 km^{2})
- Elevation: 6,565 ft (2,001 m)

Population (2020)
  - Total: 245
  - Density: 74.9/sq mi (28.92/km^{2})
- Time zone: UTC-7 (Mountain (MST))
  - Summer (DST): UTC-6 (MDT)
- ZIP code: 82329
- Area code: 307
- GNIS feature ID: 2412974
- FIPS code: 56-51575
- Website: www.medicinebow.org

Medicine Bow is a town in Carbon County, Wyoming, United States. As of the 2020 census, Medicine Bow had a population of 245.

== History ==
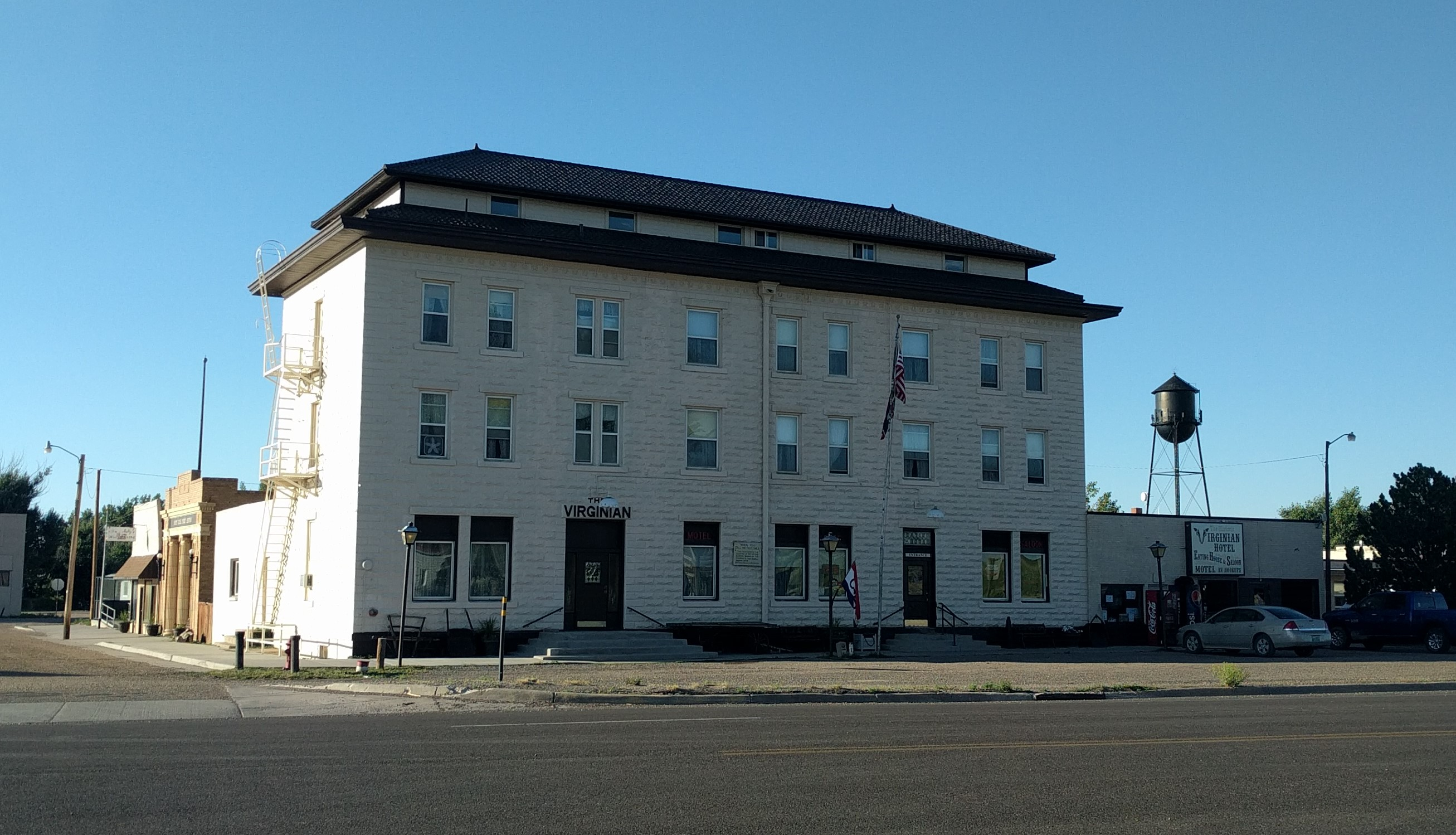
Virginian Hotel

The community largely owes its existence to the first transcontinental railroad, built through the area in 1868. A post office called Medicine Bow has been in operation since 1869. The community was named after the Medicine Bow River.

Dippy, a well-known dinosaur skeleton, was found in a quarry nearby around 1898. In 1899, fossil hunters for the American Museum of Natural History and the Field Museum stayed in or near the town during their search for large dinosaur skeletons. The town had a railroad and was near the fossiliferous sedimentary hills from the Jurassic Morrison Formation, making it an important stopping location for paleontologists, with fossils of Diplodocus and Brontosaurus found nearby at Como Bluff by the two institutions during the late 19th and early 20th centuries.

The town was noted to be plagued by crime, with famous bandits such as Butch Cassidy and his Wild Bunch committing the Wilcox Train Robbery only a few miles away from the AMNH's fossil localities and Medicine Bow itself.

The Virginian Hotel is a historic hotel located in Medicine Bow. It was built in 1911 by August Grimm, and is believed to be named for the Owen Wister novel, which is set in and around Medicine Bow. The hotel was added to the National Register of Historic Places in 1978.

In the 1910s, part of the Lincoln Highway was routed through Medicine Bow. That highway, now U.S. Route 30, was the main route through southern Wyoming until Interstate 80 replaced it in 1970.

== Geography ==
According to the United States Census Bureau, the town has a total area of 3.46 square miles (8.96 km^{2}), all land.

=== Climate ===
Climate data for Medicine Bow, Wyoming (1991–2020 normals, extremes 1948–present)
Month	Jan	Feb	Mar	Apr	May	Jun	Jul	Aug	Sep	Oct	Nov	Dec	Year
Record high °F (°C)	58 (14)	61 (16)	79 (26)	80 (27)	90 (32)	96 (36)	98 (37)	96 (36)	92 (33)	81 (27)	71 (22)	62 (17)	97 (36)
Mean maximum °F (°C)	47.6 (8.7)	50.7 (10.4)	61.9 (16.6)	72.3 (22.4)	80.2 (26.8)	88.2 (31.2)	92.5 (33.6)	89.6 (32.0)	83.8 (28.8)	74.5 (23.6)	60.2 (15.7)	48.0 (8.9)	91.6 (33.1)
Mean daily maximum °F (°C)	31.3 (−0.4)	34.8 (1.6)	45.6 (7.6)	55.1 (12.8)	64.8 (18.2)	77.4 (25.2)	85.3 (29.6)	83.0 (28.3)	73.6 (23.1)	59.1 (15.1)	42.8 (6.0)	32.8 (0.4)	57.1 (13.9)
Daily mean °F (°C)	20.8 (−6.2)	23.1 (−4.9)	31.9 (−0.1)	40.0 (4.4)	49.1 (9.5)	60.0 (15.6)	66.8 (19.3)	64.4 (18.0)	55.0 (12.8)	42.9 (6.1)	30.2 (−1.0)	21.7 (−5.7)	42.2 (5.7)
Mean daily minimum °F (°C)	10.3 (−12.1)	11.5 (−11.4)	18.1 (−7.7)	25.0 (−3.9)	33.3 (0.7)	42.6 (5.9)	48.3 (9.1)	45.9 (7.7)	36.3 (2.4)	26.7 (−2.9)	17.6 (−8.0)	10.7 (−11.8)	27.2 (−2.7)
Mean minimum °F (°C)	−13.7 (−25.4)	−14.0 (−25.6)	−2.3 (−19.1)	12.2 (−11.0)	22.2 (−5.4)	32.0 (0.0)	38.8 (3.8)	36.3 (2.4)	24.2 (−4.3)	11.3 (−11.5)	−4.5 (−20.3)	−13.0 (−25.0)	−25.1 (−31.7)
Record low °F (°C)	−46 (−43)	−44 (−42)	−22 (−30)	−10 (−23)	12 (−11)	23 (−5)	27 (−3)	27 (−3)	13 (−11)	−13 (−25)	−27 (−33)	−44 (−42)	−46 (−43)
Average precipitation inches (mm)	0.41 (10)	0.63 (16)	0.72 (18)	1.38 (35)	1.74 (44)	1.38 (35)	1.11 (28)	0.82 (21)	0.96 (24)	1.01 (26)	0.55 (14)	0.49 (12)	11.20 (284)
Average snowfall inches (cm)	6.5 (17)	7.9 (20)	7.6 (19)	7.3 (19)	2.4 (6.1)	0.0 (0.0)	0.0 (0.0)	0.0 (0.0)	1.2 (3.0)	5.5 (14)	6.5 (17)	6.8 (17)	51.7 (131)
Average precipitation days (≥ 0.01 in)	6.2	6.1	5.8	8.1	9.8	7.6	7.0	7.5	6.8	6.8	6.2	6.6	84.5
Average snowy days (≥ 0.1 in)	5.2	5.8	4.3	3.5	1.0	0.0	0.0	0.0	0.4	2.0	4.5	5.3	32.0
Source: NOAA (mean maxima/minima 1981–2010)

== Demographics ==
Historical population
Census	Pop.	Note	%±
1910	127		—
1920	210		65.4%
1930	264		25.7%
1940	338		28.0%
1950	328		−3.0%
1960	392		19.5%
1970	455		16.1%
1980	953		109.5%
1990	389		−59.2%
2000	274		−29.6%
2010	284		3.6%
2020	245		−13.7%
2025 (est.)	237	▼	−3.3%
U.S. Decennial Census

As of 2000, the median income for a household in the town was $33,750, and for a family was $35,156. Males had a median income of $41,250 versus $20,536 for females. The per capita income for the town was $16,420. About 10.3% of families and 11.9% of the population were below the poverty line, including 9.2% of those under the age of eighteen and 17.5% of those 65 or over.

=== 2010 census ===
As of the census of 2010, 284 people, 125 households, and 81 families resided in the town. The population density was 82.1 inhabitants per square mile (31.7/km^{2}). The 182 housing units had an average density of 52.6 per square mile (20.3/km^{2}). The racial makeup of the town was 95.1% White, 0.4% Pacific Islander, 3.9% from other races, and 0.7% from two or more races. Hispanics or Latinos of any race were 6.7% of the population.

Of the 125 households, 20.8% had children under 18 living with them, 50.4% were married couples living together, 7.2% had a female householder with no husband present, 7.2% had a male householder with no wife present, and 35.2% were not families. About 29.6% of all households were made up of individuals, and 18.4% had someone living alone who was 65 or older. The average household size was 2.27, and the average family size was 2.79.

The median age in the town was 49.3 years; 20.1% of residents were under 18; 3.5% were between 18 and 24; 21.1% were from 25 to 44; 29.9% were from 45 to 64; and 25.4% were 65 or older. The gender makeup of the town was 53.5% male and 46.5% female.

== Government ==
Medicine Bow's current system of government is a mayor-council government. The Mayor's office heads four council members. The current mayor is Justin George, who first took office in December 2023 after the former mayor, Bradly Buum (appointed after the resignation of Lucinda Schofield), resigned. He was elected to finish the final two years of the term in a special election in November 2024.

List of Former/Current Mayors

- Kevin Colman: In office from 2011-2019
- Sharon Biamon: In office from 2019-2023
- Lucinda Schofield: In office for 2023
- Bradly Buum: In office for 2023
- Justin George: In office from 2023 to present

== Economy ==
In December 2007, plans were announced for construction of a large coal gasification plant to be built southwest of town. The plant was expected to start construction in 2014. In 2014, DKRW Advanced Fuels terminated their contract with Sinopec, the Chinese firm that would have built the plant. In 2015, there were plans to downscale the plant, and in 2016, the project was put on indefinite hold, partly due to the low cost of crude oil in the US.

== Education ==
Public education in the town of Medicine Bow is provided by Carbon County School District Number 2. Zoned campuses include Medicine Bow Elementary School (grades K–6) and H.E.M. Junior/Senior High School (grades 7–12).

Medicine Bow has a public library, a branch of the Carbon County Library System.

== Newspaper ==
The Medicine Bow Post was a weekly newspaper published in town for 18 years from 1977 to 1995.

== See also ==
- List of municipalities in Wyoming
