= Virginian Hotel (Medicine Bow, Wyoming) =

- U.S. National Register of Historic Places
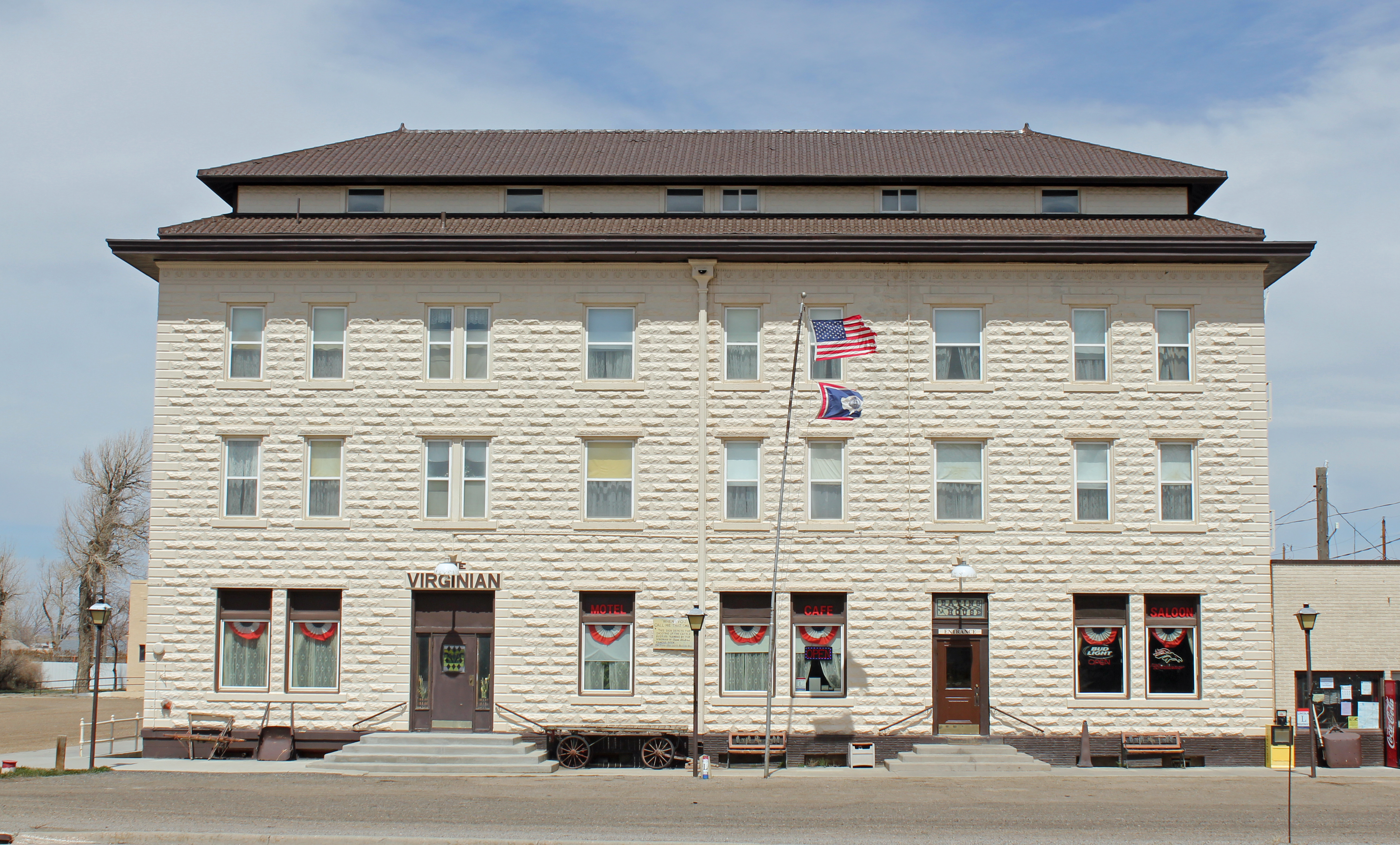
- The hotel in 2014.

- Location within Wyoming Location within the United States
- Location: U.S. Route 30, Medicine Bow, Wyoming
- Coordinates: 41°53′46″N 106°11′59″W
- Built: 1911
- Architectural style: Renaissance, Italian Renaissance
- NRHP reference No.: 78002818
- Added to NRHP: May 22, 1978

The Virginian Hotel is a historic hotel in Medicine Bow, Wyoming, United States. Construction on the hotel began in 1901 and was completed in 1911. It was built by August Grimm, the first mayor of Medicine Bow, and his partner George Plummer. The hotel is thought to be named for the famous novel written in Medicine Bow, The Virginian by Owen Wister. Although it provided a place for cowboys and railroad workers to stay while they were in town, the hotel was actually built to serve a much broader clientele. It became a headquarters for all to meet and eat as well as a setting for many business dealings.

The significance of the hotel rests upon its architecture and its history. The building is massive in size for a town the size of Medicine Bow, which has 284 residents. The hotel has served as a landmark for the town of Medicine Bow as well as a Historic Landmark for the state of Wyoming for nearly 100 years.

== Construction and architecture ==
The original building is a 3½ story structure built in a freely adapted example of Renaissance Revival in the Italian Style. Its simplicity of outline and symmetrical exterior lines are evidence of its Renaissance Revival architecture. It is constructed of concrete blocks containing sand drawn from the Medicine Bow River and fashioned at the building site. Along with the significance of the size and architecture of the hotel, it boasts the first electric lights and sewer in town.

The hotel proper is papered in Victorian gold and burgundy medallion wallpaper, has velvet draperies and pressed tin on its 12 foot high ceilings. The main floor has an "Eating House," the formal "Owen Wister Dining Room," and the "Shiloh Saloon," which still has bullet holes riddled throughout to remind guests of some past shootout. The rooms have antique brass beds, tulip-shaped lights, and are still heated by steam radiators. Only the suites have private baths, replete with claw foot bathtubs. The other rooms have access to separate bath facilities located in the halls. True to its time, the rooms in the original hotel do not have modern amenities such as telephones or televisions.

== Location ==
Upon completion, it was the biggest hotel between Denver and Salt Lake City. It is located midway between Laramie and Rawlins, Wyoming on the old Lincoln Highway (U.S. Route 30).

== History ==
On September 30, 1911, the Virginian celebrated its grand opening.

In 1957, two cement block extensions were added on to the hotel, one of which was, until recently, used as living quarters for the hotel owners but now contains rental units. These newer units have coffee makers, small refrigerators, phones, and cable TV as well as their own attached bathrooms.

In 1978, the Virginian Hotel was added to the National Register of Historic Places.

The hotel had a grand reopening in 1984, after it had been completely renovated and restored to its current turn of the century decor.
