= The Idaho Press =

Daily American newspaper

Idaho Press
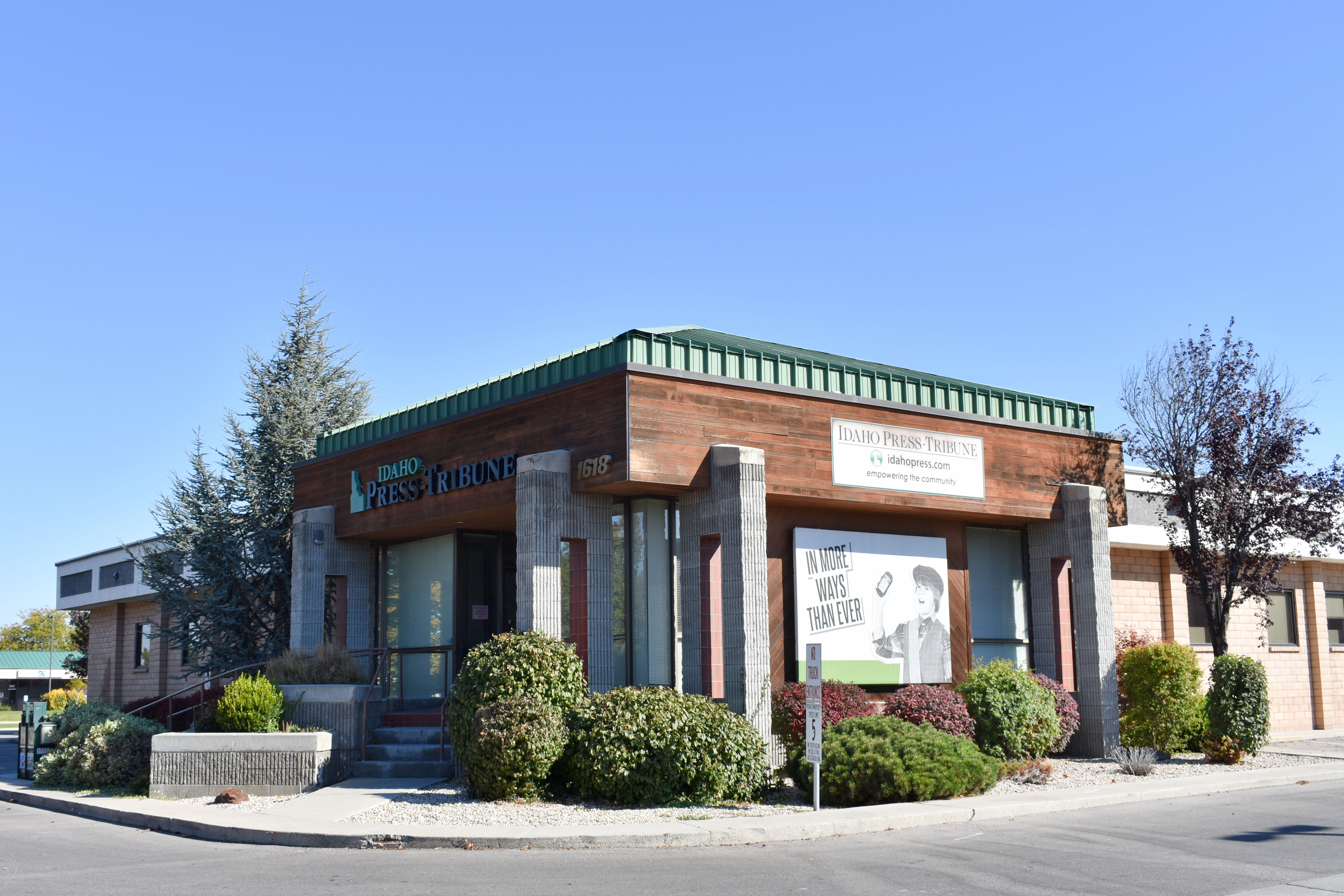
- Idaho Press headquarters in 2018
- Type: Daily newspaper
- Format: Broadsheet
- Owner: Adams MultiMedia
- Publisher: Matt Tranquill
- Founded: 1883 (as Caldwell Tribune)
- Language: English
- Headquarters: 1618 N. Midland Blvd. Nampa, Idaho 83651; United States
- Circulation: 19,792 (as of 2021)
- Website: idahopress.com

The Idaho Press of Nampa, Idaho is the second-oldest active newspaper in Idaho, first printed in December 1883. In its early years, the newspaper was often an instrument of political influence. One of the first owners and editors was Frank Steunenberg.

== Publishing history ==
=== The Caldwell Tribune ===
The Caldwell Tribune was founded by W. J. Cuddy in December 1883, and the newspaper originally was printed at 509 Market Avenue (Main Street) in Caldwell, Idaho. The Idaho Statesman said of the six-column weekly, "[It] presents a newsy appearance." In June 1884, Cuddy offered the Tribune for sale, and the paper sold in May 1886 to publisher George P. Wheeler, who sold the paper to brothers Al and Frank Steunenberg in 1887. In 1893 the Steunenbergs sold The Caldwell Tribune to R. H. Davis, former publisher of the Malad Enterprise, although Al Steunenberg continued to manage the mechanical department. C. J. Shorb became a partner at the Tribune in 1902, but the partnership was dissolved in 1903, the year in which the Tribune Printing & Publishing Co. was formed.

On April 12, 1928, The Caldwell Tribune and The Caldwell News, owned by the Shorb family, merged to become the Caldwell News-Tribune. Later owners Aden Hyde and F. H. Michaelson sold the News-Tribune in 1937 to a corporation managed by J. T. LaFond, formerly of the Nampa Free Press.

=== Nampa Leader-Herald ===
Jake Horn founded the Nampa Leader in April, 1891, and he sold the paper to F. G. Mock in 1893. A. W. Lightbourne purchased the paper in 1899, but after two months as publisher he abandoned the paper and moved to Boise. H. W. Mansfield then purchased the Leader, and in 1900 he bought the printing plant of the former Nampa Progress, published by Daniel Bacon until his death in 1896. Mansfield sold the Leader to Ned Jenness in 1907, and his son, Herold Jenness, later became editor. After the Jenness family began publishing the paper, its name was changed to the Nampa Leader-Herald. Lewis B. Jenness, brother of Ned Jenness, became publisher in 1928. He had been publisher of the Leader-Herald earlier in 1910 while his brother held political office. He owned the Weiser American prior to returning to Nampa in 1928.

Lucien P. Arant and Bernard Mainwaring purchased the Nampa Leader-Herald in 1937 and consolidated the paper into its rival, the Nampa Free Press. The Leader-Herald ceased publication as a daily newspaper on August 28, 1937, although Mainwaring briefly considered operating the paper as a weekly. Within days of the sale, the Idaho Free Press announced that it would occupy the offices of the former Nampa Leader-Herald.

=== Idaho Free Press ===
The Co-Operative Publishing Company of Nampa began printing the Idaho Free Press in April 1919. Closely aligned with the Nonpartisan League of Idaho, the newspaper was an early supporter of socialist and Progressive Party causes, and marketing favored farmers and workers. Editor W. G. Scholtz resigned in February 1920, replaced by W. V. Wiegand from The Pocatello Herald. In 1922, H. F. Samuels bought a controlling interest in the paper, by then also known as the Nampa Free Press. The daily Free Press became an evening paper in the early 1920s, but it returned to the daily format in 1923, only to switch format again in 1929. Mainwaring bought the paper in 1937 and remained in charge until 1953, when he sold the Free Press and purchased the Capital Journal in Salem, Oregon. Under Mainwaring's leadership, the Free Press migrated from a flatbed press to a modern rotary press.

The Scripps League bought the Idaho Free Press in 1954 and the Caldwell News Tribune in 1956. The official ownership was handed to Pioneer Newspapers in 1975. The Idaho Free Press and the Caldwell News Tribune merged in 1980. Pioneer sold its papers to Adams Publishing Group in 2017.

=== Idaho Press ===
In 2018, the Idaho Press-Tribune shortened its name to Idaho Press. The paper also expanded into the Boise market and acquired the Boise Weekly. The Idaho Press is the state's largest printed newspaper. It had a circulation of 20,382 as of August 1, 2020.

== See also ==
- List of newspapers in Idaho
