= Lone Peak Lookout =

- Type: Weekly newspaper
- Founder: Kevin Kelleher
- Publisher: Susanne Hill, Erin Leonard
- Editor: David Madison
- Founded: 1982
- Ceased publication: 2015-09-03
- Relaunched: 2017-12-07
- Language: English
- Headquarters: Big Sky, Montana
- Website: lonepeaklookout.com

Lone Peak Lookout was a weekly newspaper in Big Sky, Montana, United States.

== History ==
Founded in 1982 as a seasonal newspaper by Kevin Kelleher, the Lookout replaced as the Big Sky View. The newspaper covered the abduction of biathlete Kari Swenson in 1984. It became a year-round weekly newspaper in 1992 and became Montana's first full-color weekly newspaper.

It was acquired by Pioneer News Group in 1998, and that company closed the Lookout in 2015 for financial reasons. The Lookout reopened in 2017 under new ownership. It was closed again in 2019.
