= Lake County Examiner =

Weekly newspaper published in Lakeview, Oregon

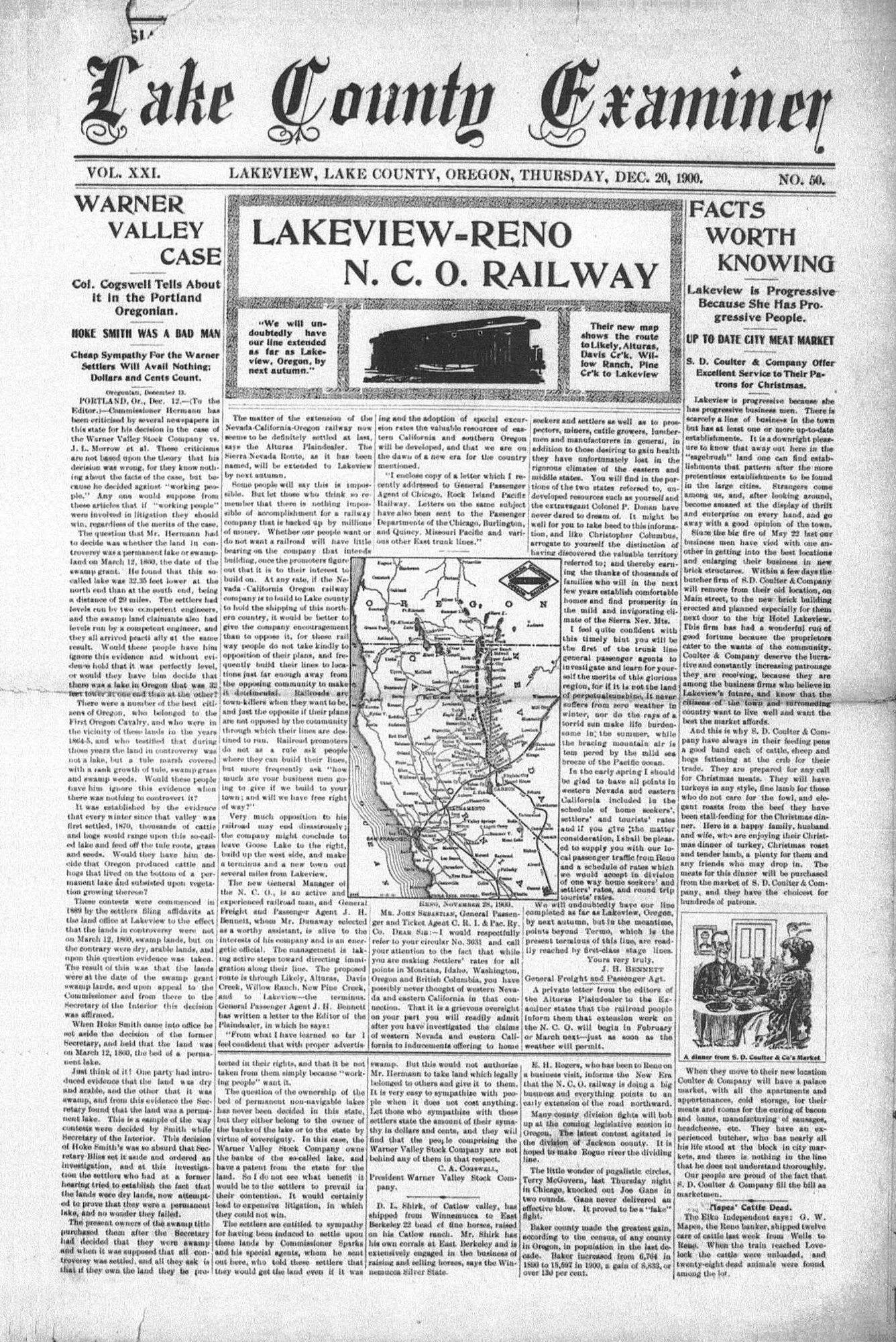
- Front page December 20, 1900
- Type: Weekly newspaper
- Owner: Adams MultiMedia
- Founders: Stephen Moss; C. A. Cogswell
- Founded: 1880
- Language: English
- Headquarters: Lakeview, Oregon
- Circulation: 1,811 (as of 2021)
- Sister newspapers: Herald and News
- Website: lakecountyexam.com

The Lake County Examiner is a weekly newspaper published in Lakeview, Oregon, United States. It was founded in 1880 by Stephen P. Moss and Charles A. Cogswell. Over the years, the paper has had a number of publishers. Since 2017, the newspaper has been owned by Adams MultiMedia. In addition to the weekly newspaper, the Examiner staff publishes a number of special editions each year along with a local real estate guide and a twice-weekly news flyer.

== Overview ==
The Lake County Examiner is a weekly newspaper that serves Lake County, Oregon. The newspaper is published every Wednesday in Lakeview, the county seat of Lake County. The Examiner is a community newspaper that primarily covers local news, sports, business, and events. Most of the newspaper's advertising is local as well. As of 2014, the Examiner had a circulation of approximately 2,400. The newspaper maintains an online presence through www.lakecountyexam.com, a web-site that features local news, commentary, sports, obituaries, and community announcements.

The Examiner normally has between five and nine employees. As of 2014, there were six full-time staff members plus one part-time employee working at the Examiner. The newspaper's annual revenue is estimated to be between $1 million and $2.5 million. The Examiner is a member of the Oregon Newspaper Publishers Association, Oregon's newspaper trade association.

== History ==
Lake County was created by the Oregon State Legislature in 1874, and founded by Charles A. Cogswell and Stephen P. Moss in 1880. The town of Lakeview was established two years later and became the county seat for Lake County. It was started as a weekly newspaper published in Lakeview. The newspaper's first editor was Frank Coffin. The first edition was published on February 5, 1880.

In its early editions, the Examiner used extremely small print type. The newspaper's front page often included anecdotes and fiction along with feature stories and news. When the newspaper began, a one-year subscription cost $3.00. However, the newspaper's main source of income was legal notices for land claims, which homesteaders were required to post publicly. After a few years in business, the Examiner installed an Eight-Medium Gordon-Franklin job press and changed to a new larger print style.

Around 1883, The Examiner merged with another Lakeview newspaper, the State Line Herald. While the State Line Herald was Lakeview's first newspaper, established in 1878, the combined publication kept the Lake County Examiner name. After the merger, the paper began advocating Republican politics on its editorial page.

During the 1880s, the Examiner was sold a number of times. In 1884, Fuller Snelling became Charles Cogswell's partner. Bruce Allen and Frank W. Beach then bought the newspaper in 1885. A year later, Seneca C. Beach bought out Allen's share, forming the company of Beach and Beach. It was published by Beach and Beach until 1891, when Frank Beach left to become editor and publisher of the Linkville Weekly Star.

On 22 May 1900, a fire burned most of Lakeview. There were no deaths, but 64 buildings were destroyed. Only two downtown business structures survived the fire. However, the Examiner staff rescued enough equipment and material to publish a special edition the day after the fire.

In 1905, C. Oscar Metzker became the newspaper's publisher. Metzker installed a linotype machine to streamline the typesetting process. At about the same time, the Examiner began publishing eight pages per issue with eight columns per page. In the early 1900s, the newspaper added political cartoons and a regular "Candidate Column" to discuss political candidates. Upbeat business articles about Lake County were common along with announcements for community events and meetings. Editorials offered opinions on politics, economic issues, and legal decisions. During this period, the Examiner also printed short stories and poems along with advice on women's fashions. However, public notices for land and mining claims remained an important revenue source for the newspaper.

In 1911, the Examiner was purchased by Fred P. Cronemiller, who also owned the Evening Herald in Klamath Falls, Oregon. His son, G. D. Cronemiller, became editor and publisher of the Examiner when his father died in 1924. In 1935, Cronemiller sold the Examiner to C. J. Gillette and Hugh McGilvra. In 1940, the owners of the Examiner purchased the Lake Country Tribune and absorbed it into their publication.

In 1967, the Examiner was sold to Dave and Micke Trussell, who sold it in 1976 to Earl G. Parsons. In 1979, Parsons sold the paper to Ifft-Scripps Newspaper, Inc., which was acquired by Pioneer Newspapers, Inc. in 1983. The company was renamed to Pioneer News Group in 2013 and sold its papers to Adams Publishing Group in 2017.

As of 2026, the paper only has one full-time reporter.

== Other publications ==
In addition to the weekly newspaper, the Examiner staff publishes up to twelve special editions each year. The special editions focus on local industries such as farming, ranching, and forestry as well as events like the Lake County Fair and Lakeview's annual hang gliding festival. The staff also publishes a local real-estate guide called Home Sweet Home. Twice a week the Examiner publishes a legal-size street flyer called the Lakeview Low Down. This offers news bullets and local advertising and is distributed through Lakeview area restaurants. The company also does job-order printing and publishing, photocopying, bookbinding, and engraving. The Examiner is registered to do contract printing and publishing work for the federal government.
