= Robert McLean (minister) =

American clergyman and politician

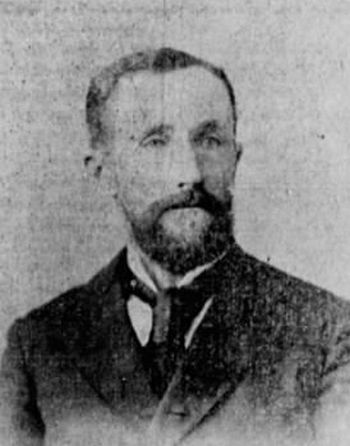
- Reverend Robert McLean, 1902

Member of the Oregon House of Representatives from the 26th district
- In office 1887–1888
- Preceded by: Uriah F. Abshier
- Succeeded by: Stephen P. Moss

Personal details
- Born: February 22, 1846 Vernon Center, New York, US
- Died: October 30, 1926 (aged 80) Los Angeles, California, US
- Party: Republican
- Spouse: Lucy Ripley Norris
- Profession: Presbyterian minister

Robert McLean (February 22, 1846 – October 30, 1926) was an American Presbyterian minister and Oregon state legislator. As a minister, he founded churches in two southern Oregon communities and served as a missionary in Chile and Puerto Rico. He also served a two-year term in the Oregon House of Representatives as a Republican, representing a large rural district in the south-central part of the state.

== Early life ==
McLean was born on February 22, 1846, in Vernon Center, New York, the son of Angus McLean and Mary (McGregor) McLean. When he was eighteen, he enlisted in the Union Army. He served during the American Civil War as private in Company C of the 14 New York Heavy Artillery. He began his Army service in January 1864 and was discharged as a corporal in August 1865. After the war, he joined his brother in the western United States, where he worked as a miner and a cowboy.

McLean eventually returned to the east coast to attended college. He enrolled in Hamilton College in Clinton, New York, where he graduated in 1876. He then went on to graduate school at Auburn Theological Seminary in New York City, finishing his studies there in 1877. After finishing his seminary education, McLean married Lucy Ripley Norris on August 29, 1877, in Galena, Illinois.

== Missionary and minister ==
Shortly after their marriage, the McLeans left for Chile, where they served as Presbyterian missionaries in the town of Concepción for six years. McLean spoke fluent Spanish, which allowed him to effectively interact with the people of Chile on a personal level. He also published a Christian newspaper call El Republicano. During his time in Chile, MClean traveled widely, speaking to church groups around the country and founding several new Presbyterian congregations. His travels included four trips over the Andes Mountains. In addition, he was in Chile during that country's war with Peru and Bolivia. Eventually, McLean and his family developed chronic illnesses. To restore their health, the family left Chile and returned to the United States in 1883.

Back in the United States, McLean left his family in Illinois while he traveled out west looking for a place where his family could recover their health through a vigorous outdoor lifestyle. He decided Oregon was the place to settle. He stayed briefly in Ashland before moving to a farm property in Klamath County. His family joined him there late in 1883. McLean's farm was located 11 miles (18 km) north of Linkville (later renamed Klamath Falls), between the small unincorporated communities of Algma and Naylox. In 1885, McLean was appointed postmaster in Naylox.

While McLean began farming, he also made regular trips to Linkville to conduct Sunday church services. At that time, there were no churches in Linkville (or anywhere in Klamath County), so Sunday services were held in the local schoolhouse and later in a hotel. McLean eventually established a sizable Presbyterian congregation in Linkville. As a result, he became Klamath County's first resident minister. In addition, he successfully raised funds for construction of the county's first church building. The First Presbyterian Church building was completed in 1885 and dedicated on November 15 of that year.

== State Legislator ==
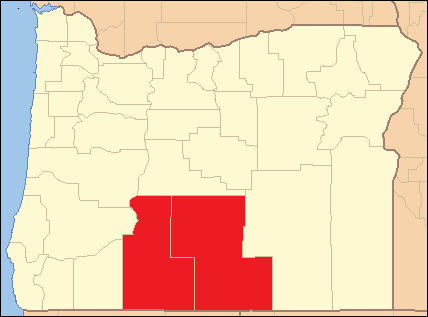
Oregon House District 26, 1987–1888

While he was organizing his new congregation and making plans for construction of Linkville's first church building, Mclean decided he would also enter politics. In 1886, he ran for a seat in the state legislature as a Republican. He was opposed by Democrat, John F. Miller. In the June election that year, McLean won the District 26 seat in the Oregon House of Representatives, receiving 336 votes against Miller's 200 votes. District 26 represented Klamath and Lake counties, two large rural counties in south-central Oregon.

McLean took his District 26 seat in the Oregon House of Representatives on January 10, 1887. He served through the 1887 regular legislative session which ended on February 18. During the short six-week session, he served on the credentials, public lands, and Indian affairs committees.

After leaving the legislature, McLean remained active in state and local politics. He campaigned around the state for the Republican candidates and spoke in support of the party's platform. As a result, he was selected as a presidential elector supporting Benjamin Harrison at Oregon's Republican convention of 1888. In the November election that year, he was confirmed as an elector based on Oregon's presidential election results. In January 1889, he officially cast his electoral college vote for President Harrison.

== New congregations ==
Near the end of 1887, a delegation from Grants Pass, Oregon, approached McLean with an opportunity to establish a Presbyterian congregation in their community. He accepted the offer. After moving to Grants Pass in early 1888, he began preaching in the Josephine County courthouse to only six worshippers. However, the congregation grew quickly. By the end of 1888, he had raised enough money to purchase land and began building a church, which was completed in early 1889. When Bethany Church was dedicated, McLean became the founding pastor. Under his leadership the church was self-supporting by 1892; and was, soon thereafter, a major supporter of Presbyterian missions outside the community.

Throughout the 1890s, McLean continued to grow his Grants Pass congregation. He was very active in the local community and also became prominent in regional Presbyterian church affairs. He often preached and spoke at churches, colleges, and events around the state. As a result of this notoriety, he received several offers to lead well established Portland churches. However, he remained in Grants Pass until 1899, when he finally accepted a position as pastor of Third Presbyterian Church, a new start-up congregation in Portland.

After arriving in Portland, McLean quickly became popular with members of the Third Presbyterian Church congregation. While he was a conservative theologian, McLean was also open minded and was not afraid to voice his opinion on controversial issues. His popularity with his congregation allowed him to publicly express progressive views on several controversial issues of the day. For example, he supported public debate on the theory of evolution. Another example was his view on prohibition. While he was opposed to the use of alcohol, he did not believe the government should outlaw its use. In 1901, McLean was offered the opportunity to take a missionary position in Cuba. However, he declines because of an on-going construction project at Third Presbyterian Church. A year later with the construction project completed, McLean and his wife left Portland to pursue a mission opportunity in Puerto Rico.

== Later career ==
In 1902, McLean left Portland for a new missionary assignment in Puerto Rico, where he could put his Spanish language skills and familiarity with Hispanic culture to use again. In Puerto Rico, he was responsible for all the Presbyterian churches and related institutions on the island. He also supervised the construction of a large church financed hospital in San Juan. McLean remained in Puerto Rico for six years.

After leaving Puerto Rico in 1908, McLean returned to Oregon. He accepted the position of pastor at Bethany Church in Grants Pass, the church he founded in that community in the 1880s. In 1911, Lucy McLean died suddenly. She was buried in a local cemetery. After his wife's death, McLean remained at Bethany Church for another two years before accepting a missionary position in the southwest United States.

Initially, McLean's missionary work focused on the Spanish-speaking congregations in New Mexico. However, shortly after arriving in the area, the Presbyterian Church's mission board appointed him superintendent of Spanish language missions in five southwest states. That position required him to travel between California, Arizona, Colorado, New Mexico and Texas. While he had his headquarters in Los Angeles, McLean regularly traveled around the southwest. He also stayed in touch with the Grants Pass community, sending regular letters to the local newspaper which were printed as travel articles.

McLean died on October 30, 1926, at Glendale Sanatorium in the Eagle Rock neighborhood of northeast Los Angeles. He had been ill for several month prior to his death. His funeral was held on November 2 in Los Angeles, California. After the funeral service, his son accompanied his body to Grants Pass, Oregon, where he was buried next to his wife in a local cemetery.
