= Bingham News Chronicle =

Weekly newspaper published in Blackfoot, Idaho

- Type: Weekly newspaper
- Owner: Adams MultiMedia
- Founder: W.A. McVicar
- Founded: 1917
- Language: English
- Headquarters: 305 S. Arthur; Pocatello, ID 83204
- City: Blackfoot, Idaho
- Website: bcchron.com

The Bingham News Chronicle is a weekly newspaper published in Blackfoot, Idaho. It is owned by Adams MultiMedia.

== History ==
In 1917, W.A. McVicar founded the Evening Bulletin in Blackfoot, Idaho. In 1926, McVicar sold the paper to John L. Brady, former editor of the Idaho State Journal. Three years later the Evening Bulletin merged with the Blackfoot Republican to form the Daily Bulletin. The Republican was founded by Byrd Trego.

In 1933, Brady died from a heart attack. His widow Mrs. Lee Crittenden Brady and Trego operated the Daily Bulletin until selling it to Edwin H. Paysen and John L. Rider in 1939. W.R. Twining, publisher of the Crockett Signal of California, bought the paper in 1942. He then closed the Signal.

In 1947, Harold H. Smith, former owner of the Northside News at Jerome, Idaho, bought the Daily Bulletin from Twining. In 1957, Smith sold the paper to Drury R. Brown, business manager at The Hutchinson News. In 1960, the paper switched from an evening to a morning publication. Around that time the paper's name was changed to the Blackfoot News. In 1981, the paper was renamed to The Morning News. At that time its circulation was 6,700.

Brown died on April 1, 1986. Three months later his widow Catherine Brown sold The Morning News to Gloucester Suburban Newspapers Inc., of New Jersey. The company was co-owned by Peter Bernhard and William Dean Singleton, and was affiliated with MediaNews Group. In September 1987, American Publishing Company, a subsidiary of Hollinger Inc., bought the paper. At some point The Morning News was acquired by Horizon Publications, Inc.

In 2018, KIFI-TV reported the paper was plagued with production issues and that nearly a dozen employees were fired or quit. In 2019, Adams Publishing Group launched the Bingham County Chronicle, a five-day paper which competed with The Morning News. In 2020, Adams acquired the Blackfoot Morning News and merged it with the Chronicle to form the Bingham News Chronicle. The paper went on hiatus in 2022 during the COVID-19 pandemic and resumed print publication as a weekly paper in 2025.
