= Belgrade News =

- Supporting our community
- Type: Biweekly newspaper
- Owner: Adams MultiMedia
- Founded: 2004
- Language: English
- Headquarters: Belgrade, Montana
- Circulation: 4,000 (as of 2021)
- Sister newspapers: Bozeman Daily Chronicle
- Website: belgrade-news.com

Belgrade News is a newspaper in Belgrade, Montana, United States. It is a biweekly, published every Tuesday and Friday for free.

== History ==
The Belgrade News was first published on February 3, 2004. It was created by Big Sky Publishing, a division of Pioneer News Group and owner of the Bozeman Daily Chronicle. Pioneer sold its papers to Adams Publishing Group in 2017.
