= Jackson Hole News&Guide =

Weekly newspaper published in Jackson, Wyoming

- Type: Weekly newspaper
- Owner: Teton Media Works
- Founder(s): Floy Tonkin; William Kirol
- Publisher: Adam Meyer
- Editor-in-chief: Johanna Love
- Managing editor: Billy Arnold
- Founded: 1952
- Language: English
- Headquarters: 1225 Maple Way; Jackson, Wyoming, 83001, U.S.
- Country: United States
- Circulation: 7,575
- OCLC number: 51071474
- Website: jhnewsandguide.com

The Jackson Hole News&Guide is a weekly newspaper in the town of Jackson, Wyoming, United States. The News&Guide is published Wednesdays with an average circulation of 7,000 and is the newspaper of record for Teton County, Wyoming.The paper covers news, sports and feature stories in the town of Jackson and Teton County, Wyoming, and specializes in environmental issues in the Greater Yellowstone Ecosystem.

== History ==
On July 17, 1952, Mrs. Floy Tonkin published the first issue of the Jackson Hole Guide. William "Bill" Kirol was associate and business manager. Tonkin and Kirol were previously connected to the Jackson Hole Courier. In 1968, the Guide was sold to Fred A. McCabe and Ron Lytle.

On April 17, 1970, Norman Lynes published the first edition of the Jackson Hole News. Virginia Huidekoper and Ralph Gill were also co-founders. Lynes also published the Jackson Hole Daily Villager, a free mimeographed paper he produced out of his home. He soon left the News after a few issues and died of a heart attack in March 1973 at age 41.

A year after its founding, Marc Fisher bought out Gill. In June 1973, controlling interest in the News was acquired by managing editor Michael Sellett, who recently joined the staff as a writer. In 1985, an unknown person spent $500 to buy up half of the 4,000 printed copies of the News in an apparent attempt to sensor a story about a drug case. Sellett printed another 2,000 copies in response.

In 1997, Fred McCabe died and the Guide was inherited by his widow Elizabeth "Liz" McCabe. At that time the McCabes also owned The Pinedale Roundup, Teton Valley News and Pioneer Press. On November 22, 2002, the Guide and News merged, with the owners citing rising costs and a desire to retain local ownership. In 2004, Fred McCabe was inducted into the Wyoming Press Hall of Fame. In 2011, Gov. Matt Mead declared March 20 to be "Elizabeth McCabe Day" in honor of her 100th birthday.

Sellett and McCabe co-published the Jackson Hole News&Guide until Liz McCabe's death in 2012 at age 101. Later that year Sellett and McCabe's heirs sold their shares to the paper's chief operating officer, Kevin Olson, who formed Teton Media Works as the parent company for the News&Guide and its sister publication, the Jackson Hole Daily, and a suite of magazines. In 2021, News&Guide's associate publisher Adam Meyer became a minority shareholder in Teton Media Works. Meyer is also vice president and COO of the company. He was promoted to publisher in 2023.
