= List of newspapers in American Samoa =

This is a list of newspapers in American Samoa.

== Daily and nondaily newspapers ==
- Samoa News – Pago Pago
- Samoa Observer – Savalalo and Vaitele
