= 19th-century newspapers that supported the Prohibition Party =

19th-century newspapers that supported the Prohibition Party in the United States were published in many states. The Delaware, Ohio Signal, established in 1873, claimed to be the oldest distinct Prohibition Party paper in the world.

== History ==
It was difficult to draw the line between papers that advocated prohibition in a nonpartisan way, and those that advocated the Prohibition Party method. The former would include nearly all the religions papers, and many Republican and Democratic papers. This list draws the line distinctly on the support of the Prohibition Party. A few of the papers were merely local newspapers that did not devote much space to political discussion or news, but did favor the Prohibition Party when they did speak. (Note: According to Copleland (1892), in each case, the publisher of the paper was written to and asked to give the information desired. In most cases the publisher replied, and his statement was used. In cases where the publisher failed to reply, reference was made to N. W. Ayer's Newspaper Annual for 1891, and the statistics taken from that source.)

== List of newspapers ==
The list, substantially, was published in the Voice of June 30, 1892, with the request that any person noticing any errors or omissions communicate with the author. Several corrections and additions were received, and the information added. In three or four cases, papers were referred to as omitted, without any information as to price, circulation, etc. in such cases, if the paper was not in any of the newspaper annuals, it was omitted, there not being time for correspondence. No Prohibition Party paper of any considerable prominence was omitted from the list.— (Note: m. Monthly, d. Daily, f. Fortnightly. Where no letter is used it will be understood that the paper is weekly.)

=== California ===
- Voice, Los Angeles, California
- Redlands Daily Facts, Redlands, California
- The Pacific Ensign, San Francisco, California
- Prohibitionist, San Jose, California

=== Colorado ===
- Bulletin, Denver, Colorado

=== Connecticut ===
- New England Home, Hartford, Connecticut
- Review, Groton, Connecticut
- Banner, Highland Park, Connecticut

=== Florida ===
- Mid-Florida Herald, Midland, Florida

=== Georgia ===
- Southern Star, Atlanta, Georgia
- Southern Agent (m.), Atlanta, Georgia
- Times, Demorest, Georgia

=== Illinois ===
- Lancet, Bloomington, Illinois
- Advance, Bunker Hill, Illinois
- Lever, Chicago, Illinois
- The Union Signal, Chicago, Illinois
- State Sentinel, Decatur, Illinois
- Friend of Home, Effingham, Illinois
- Patrol, Geneva, Illinois
- News, Joliet, Illinois
- Truth, Monmouth, Illinois
- Spectator, Oquawka, Illinois
- Patriot, Quincy, Illinois
- Monitor, Rockford, Illinois
- Best Words, Shelbyville, Illinois
- Liberator, Springfield, Illinois
- Journal, Vienna, Illinois

=== Indiana ===
- Crystallizer, Goshen, Indiana
- Phalanx, Indianapolis, Indiana
- Organizer, Indianapolis, Indiana
- Standard, Leesburg, Indiana
- Times, Logansport, Indiana
- Home (m.), New Albany, Indiana
- Prohihition Era, Princeton, Indiana
- Enterprise, Richmond, Indiana

=== Iowa ===
- News (d). Des Moines, Iowa
- News (w'kly), Des Moines, Iowa
- Prohihitionist, Des Moines, Iowa
- Advance (m.), Mount Ayr, Iowa
- Champion of Progress, Sioux City, Iowa
- Voter, Cedar Rapids, Iowa

=== Kansas ===
- Lever, Ottawa, Kansas
- Star, Richfield, Kansas

=== Kentucky ===
- Worker, Lexington, Kentucky
- Journal, Louisville, Kentucky
- Kentucky Methodist, Louisville, Kentucky

=== Maine ===
- Herald, Portland, Maine
- Sun, Portland, Me

=== Maryland ===
- Advocate, Baltimore, Maryland

=== Massachusetts ===
- Campaign (m.), Lowell, Massachusetts

=== Michigan ===
- Messenger, Adrian, Michigan
- Argus, Edwardsburg, Michigan
- Saturday Night, Grand Rapids, Michigan

=== Minnesota ===
- Svenska Americanska Posten, Minneapolis, Minnesota
- Leader, Minneapolis, Minnesota

=== Mississippi ===
- Leader, Jackson, Mississippi

=== Montana ===
- New Issue, Bozeman, Montana

=== Nebraska ===
- Herald, Chester, Nebraska
- New Republic, Lincoln, Nebraska
- Looking Glass, Montrose, Nebraska
- Tribune, Neligh, Nebraska
- Guide, Superior, Nebraska
- Courier, Central City, Nebraska

=== New Hampshire ===
- Narrative (m.), Claremont, New Hampshire

=== New Jersey ===
- Temperance Gazette, Camden, New Jersey
- Visitor, Flemington, New Jersey
- Journal, Dover, New Jersey
- Signal (f.), Sparta, New Jersey
- Outlook, Vineland, New Jersey
- Live Issues, Newark, New Jersey

=== New York ===
- Home Advocate, Dundee, New York
- Star, Machias, New York
- Parmer Pioneer, New York City, New York
- Voiced, New York, New York
- Witness, New York, New York
- Advance, Sherman, New York
- Delaware Standard, Walton, New York
- Advocate, Watertown, New York
- Times, Canisteo, New York
- Post, Belmont, New York
- People's Record, Newburgh, New York
- News and Banner, Rome, New York

=== North Carolina ===
- Living Issue, High Point, North Carolina
- Times, Reidsville, North Carolina

=== North Dakota ===
- Normanden, Grand Forks, North Dakota
- Dakotan (m.), Jamestown, North Dakota
- Benson County News, Leeds, North Dakota

=== Ohio ===
- Flamheau, Cadiz, Ohio
- Liherator, Dayton, Ohio
- Transcript, Greenville, Ohio
- Vigilant, London, Ohio
- Beacon, Springfield, Ohio
- New Era, Springfield, Ohio
- Sentinel, Toledo, Ohio
- Herald, Wooster, Ohio
- Sun, Ashland, Ohio

=== Pennsylvania ===
- Times, Parkesburg, Pennsylvania
- Keystone, Pittsburgh, Pennsylvania
- People, Scranton, Pennsylvania
- Watchfire, Wilkes-Barre, Pennsylvania
- Sunbeam (m.), Milton, Pennsylvania
- Prohihitionist (f), Chester, Pennsylvania
- Archive, Downingtown, Pennsylvania
- Prohibitionist, Letity, Pennsylvania
- Griffin's Journal, Philadelphia, Pennsylvania
- Educator, Pittsburgh, Pennsylvania
- National Issue, Pittsburgh, Pennsylvania
- Index, Williamsport, Pennsylvania

=== Rhode Island ===
- Citizen, Providence, Rhode Island
- Tribune (d.), Westerly, Rhode Island

=== South Carolina ===
- Public Opinion, Chester, South Carolina

=== South Dakota ===
- Beacon, Plankinton, South Dakota

=== Tennessee ===
- Advance (d.), Harriman, Tennessee
- Advance (w.), Harriman, Tennessee
- Issue, Nashville, Tennessee

=== Texas ===
- National Reformer, Houston, Texas
- Advance, Waco and Houston, Texas

=== Vermont ===
- Herald (m), Montpelier, Vermont
- Anti-Liquor, Danville, Vermont

=== Washington ===
- Issue, Seattle, Washington

=== West Virginia ===
- Quest, Wheeling, West Virginia

=== Wisconsin ===
- Eye and Star, Dodgeville, Wisconsin
- Reform, Eau Claire, Wisconsin
- Blade, Elkhorn, Wisconsin
- Wave, Independence, Wisconsin
- Northwestern Mail, Madison, Wisconsin
- Herald, Menominee, Wisconsin
- Voice, New Richmond, Wisconsin
- Signal, Oshkosh, Wisconsin
- Enterprise, Palmyra, Wisconsin
- Campaigner, Madison, Wisconsin
