= Charles A. Cogswell =

American politician

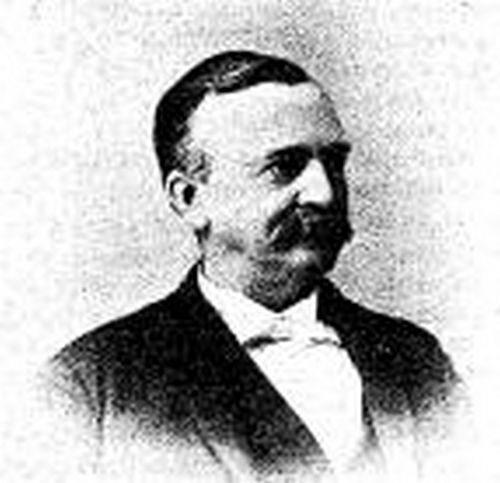
- Oregon State Senator Charles Cogswell, 1894

Member of the Oregon Senate from the 6th, 8th, and 9th district
- In office 1889 — 1896
- Preceded by: C. M. Cartwright
- Succeeded by: Bernard Daly
- Constituency: Crook, Klamath, and Lake counties

Personal details
- Born: January 3, 1844 Rutland, Vermont
- Died: April 24, 1908 (aged 64) Portland, Oregon
- Party: Democratic
- Profession: Attorney

Charles Amos Cogswell (January 3, 1844 – April 24, 1908) was an American politician and attorney from the state of Oregon. He served in the Union Army during the American Civil War. After the war, he moved to Lakeview, Oregon, where he became the area's first practicing attorney and was co-founder of the Lake County Examiner. Cogswell was elected to two four-year terms in the Oregon State Senate. During his tenure in the legislature, he was known as a conservative Democrat; however, near the end of his second term in the senate, he became a Republican. After retiring from his law practice, Cogswell moved to Portland, Oregon, where he was active in business and engaged in public service.

== Early life ==
Cogswell was born in Rutland, Vermont on January 3, 1844. His parents were Amos and Maria (Johnson) Cogswell. In 1857, his family removed to Iowa. Cogswell attended public schools there.

When the American Civil War broke out, Cogswell enlisted in the Union Army. He began his military career at the age of 17, serving in Company B of the 26th Iowa Volunteer Infantry Regiment. In 1864, he participated in Major General William Tecumseh Sherman's Savannah campaign, better known as Sherman's March to the Sea. He was promoted for bravery in combat. By the end of the war, Cogswell had risen to the rank of lieutenant and was commander of an infantry company.

== Oregon pioneer ==
In 1869, Cogswell moved to south central Oregon. When he arrived, he was one of the first settlers to make his home in the Goose Lake Valley. He taught school and then studied law. In 1879, he was approved to practice law in Oregon courts. When he opened his law office in Lakeview, Cogswell became the first attorney to practice law in Lake County, Oregon. As an attorney, he represented a wide range of clients including the Southern Pacific Railroad and a number of large ranches.

In addition to his law practice, Cogswell was a successful businessman. In 1877, Cogswell built a two-story commercial building in downtown Lakeview. The building had a drug store on the first floor, a noteworthy addition to Lakeview's business community. Later, Cogswell joined Stephen P. Moss to found the Lake County Examiner. The weekly newspaper's first edition was published in January 1880. Initially, the newspaper editorials supported the Democratic Party. In 1883, Cogswell acquired the Republican oriented State Line Herald, merging that newspaper into the Examiner. With the merger, the new consolidated Examiner began to advocate Republican politics on it editorial page. Cogswell sold his interests in the newspaper in 1885. Over the years, Cogswell was involved in a number of other businesses in and around Lake County. For example, he helped found the Bank of Lakeview in 1887. Cogswell also served as president of the Warner Valley Stock Company, a livestock ranching enterprise that owned 40,000 acres (160 km^{2}) of grazing land in southern Oregon and northern California.

Cogswell was also engaged in local politics. In 1887, he was elected County Judge, the top executive position in the Lake County government. Then in 1892, the citizens of Lakeview elected him mayor for the first time. He was re-elected as mayor in 1893 and again in 1895.

== State senator ==
In 1888, Cogswell decided to run for the District 6 seat in the Oregon State Senate. The senate district included Crook, Klamath, and Lake counties. After winning the election, he took his seat in the Oregon Senate on 14 January 1889 and served through the 1889 regular session, which ended on 14 February. During the session, he was appointed to a committee assigned to study and make recommendations regarding Oregon's assessment and tax structure. Later in 1889, Cogswell joined other civic and political leaders from southern Oregon to oppose the closure of Fort Klamath. In a letter to the United States Secretary of War dated 31 August 1889, transmitted via Oregon's United States Senator John H. Mitchell, Cogswell and others protested the closure of Fort Klamath. The letter said that some dishonest stockman had previously encroached on Indian treaty lands causing local Indians to take reprisals against innocent farmers and ranchers. The letter said that the presence of the United States Army at Fort Klamath kept everyone on their own land, ensuring peace in southern Oregon. While the post was closed in 1890, a small detachment of troops was left behind to help protect the Klamath Indian Reservation's grazing lands from encroachment by settlers.

Since Oregon state senators serve a four-year term, Cogswell did not have to run for re-election prior to the opening of the 1891 legislative session. Prior to the election, some state legislative district boundaries were redrawn. As a result, Cogswell's senate district was changed from District 6 to District 9. While given a new district number, his constituency did not change. In the 1889 regular legislative session, he still represented Crook, Klamath, and Lake counties. He served in that session from 12 January through 20 February.

Cogswell was re-elected to the state senate in 1892. While he had easily won the 1888 election, he won the 1892 election by double his previous vote margin. Also, his district number was changed once again. While he continued to represent Crook, Klamath, and Lake counties, his new district was District 8. He served in the 1893 regular legislative session from 9 January to 17 February. At the beginning of the session, Cogswell was the Democratic candidate for President of the Senate. However, the Republican majority elected C. W. Fulton to that post. Fulton then appointed Cogswell chairman of the senate's federal relations committee.

In 1894, Cogswell ran for the seat in the United States Congress from Oregon's 1st congressional district. However, he lost to the incumbent Republican, Binger Hermann. Because he was elected to a four-year senate term, Cogswell did not lose his state senate seat when he ran for Congress. Therefore, he continued to represent the people of Crook, Klamath, and Lake counties in state senate District 8 during the 1895 regular legislative session. That session began on 14 January and lasted for one month, ending on 14 February. His Democratic Party affiliation had been tenuous for a long time since he often voted with Republicans on key legislative issues. Near the end of his four-year term, Cogswell left the Democratic Party and became a Republican.

== Later career ==
After leaving the legislature, Cogswell retired from his law practice in Lakeview and moved with his family to Portland. In Portland, he continued participating in a wide range of business activities. He was a major investor in several large banks. He served as a director of the Oregon Life Insurance Company while he also remained president of the Warner Valley Stock Company with land interests in southern Oregon, northern California, and Nevada. In 1902, Cogswell was one of the founders of the Midway Telegraph and Telephone Company. That same year, he became a director of the newly incorporated Columbia River and Northern Railroad. Other officials of that business included Rufus Mallory, Henry W. Corbett, and Henry Pittock.

Cogswell also became involved in Portland's city government. In 1902, just before leaving office Portland mayor Henry S. Rowe, appointed him to the city's public works board. Three years later, mayor Harry Lane appointed Cogswell to the City Executive Board. In that capacity, he was one of Lane's closest advisors. As a member of the executive board, he served as chairman of the board's judiciary committee for three years.

Cogswell was also very active in a number of civic groups. He was a member of the Sumner Post of the Grand Army of the Republic and a member of the Military Order of the Loyal Legion of the United States. Both organizations were for Civil War veterans of the Union Army. He also belonged to several Freemasonry orders.

== Death and legacy ==
On April 24, 1908, Cogswell suffered a heart attack while running to catch an electric trolley car near his home in Portland. After boarding the trolley, he complained to two friends that he was out of breath. He then collapsed and died before medical help could be summoned. Cogswell's will left his estate to his wife and children. At the time of his death, his estate was valued in access of $100,000.

After Cogswell's death, flags on public building in Portland were flown at half-mast. On 9 May 1908, friends and colleagues gathered to honor him at a memorial service held at the courthouse in Portland. The court and members of the Oregon State Bar passed a resolution honoring Cogswell and had it read into the court record. A few days later, Portland's executive board passed a resolution honoring Cogswell. The resolution highlighted his long record of public service as a soldier, attorney, legislator, and engaged citizen.
