= News-Examiner =

Newspaper

- Type: Weekly newspaper
- Owner: Adams MultiMedia
- Founder: Charles Harris
- Founded: 1895
- Language: English
- Headquarters: 843 Washington St, Montpelier, ID 83254
- OCLC number: 13168790
- Website: hjnews.com/montpelier

The News-Examiner is a weekly newspaper published in Montpelier, Idaho.

== History ==
On March 2, 1895, Charles Edward Harris published the first edition of The Montpelier Examiner. In 1903, C. A. Brewster and Dr. H. M. Holbrook became the proprietors. In 1904, a cooperation headed by C.E. Wright took ownership. In 1908, L.G. Bradley purchased the business, but was later bought out a year later by Clyde Hansen who then later resold it to Wright.

In 1920, H.M. Nelson, of Pocatello, purchased the paper. He died a decade later and his widow and children continued operating the Examiner. In 1937, Mable C. Nelson sold the Examiner to W. Jerome Taylor. A week later Taylor merged his paper with the Bear Lake Valley News, owned by H. A. and A.M. Robinson, to form The News-Examiner. The first issue was published Sept. 16, 1937.

The Robinsons left at some point and the Taylors continued to operate the paper until selling it in 1974 to L.W. "Bill" Thompson, Wayne Bell and Walter Ross. All the owners had retired by the time Ross sold The News-Examiner, and several other they started or acquired, to a company called Sun News Inc. in 1999. The business later became SWI News, which sold the all of its papers in Idaho and Utah to Pioneer News Group in 2007. A decade later the company sold its 22 papers to Adams Publishing Group in 2017.
