= Medicine Bow Post =

Newspaper published in Medicine Bow, Wyoming

- Type: Weekly newspaper
- Owner: University of Wyoming
- Founder: David L. Roberts
- Founded: September 30, 1977
- Ceased publication: July 26, 1995
- Language: English
- Headquarters: Medicine Bow, Wyoming
- OCLC number: 27737240

The Medicine Bow Post was a weekly newspaper published in Medicine Bow, Wyoming, from 1977 to 1995. It also covered Elk Mountain, Hanna and Rock River. The paper was founded by David L. Roberts who after 11 years donated it to the University of Wyoming for use as a student publication.

== History ==
On September 30, 1977, David L. Roberts published the first edition of the Medicine Bow Post. Roberts grew up in Lusk and studied journalism at the University of Arizona where he wrote for the school paper, the Arizona Daily Wildcat. He then worked as a reporter for the Lake Powell Chronicle before launching his own paper in Medicine Bow, which at that time was home to around 500 people. Roberts only intended to operate the paper for five years, but soon feel in love with life as a small-town publisher.

At that time the local economy in Medicine Bow was prospering from coal mining in the Hana Basin and was experiencing a boom from Uranium mining in the Shirley Basin. The Post was financially successful for its first five years of operation and Roberts won numerous regional journalism awards annually throughout his time as publisher. Revenue peaked in 1982 and the Post then started to decline as the local mining boom went bust.

Also in 1982, Roberts swapped places for two weeks with reporter Chip Brown at The Washington Post and each wrote about the experience. The swap came about after Roberts pitched the idea to publisher Katharine Graham. The experience added to Roberts' fame as one of the most notable local journalists in the Wyoming at that time.

In 1986, Roberts was named "Citizen of the Year" in Medicine Bow. In May 1987, Roberts, who operated the paper out of his home at a six-unit apartment building, who forced to move. He was the last tenet in the building, which had been sold and set to be moved to Greeley, Colorado. Soon after, Roberts put the paper up for sale due to the town's economic downturn and considered giving it away if he got a job elsewhere. In September 1987, Roberts was hired to work as the advisor for the Branding Iron, a student-run paper at the University of Wyoming. At that time he taught a summer class at the school, and despite putting the Post up for sale months earlier, now said he was now unsure about selling it.

In June 1988, Roberts offered to donate the Post to the school in order to give students a place to gain practical experience. Circulation then was 800. Members of the school's board trustees debated whether or not to accept the offer, since the paper was unprofitable, with its current advertisement sales, subscriptions and legal notices just enough for the business to break even. Also, a year prior the school debated scrapping its journalism program entirely. In the end, the trustees were inspired by other student-run papers, like The Tombstone Epitaph at the University of Arizona and Ogden Citizen at Utah State University, and in October 1988 officially accepted the gift. UW then allocated $10,000 to buy new equipment for the Post.

Instructor Tom Hacker guided twelve student staffers at the Post, who after a year increased circulation to 1,100. The paper's student editor lived in Medicine Bow for the semester while the other students commuted to town, which by then its population had decreased to 300, several times a weeks from the school's campus in Laramie. The students worked out of the defunct Medicine Bow State Bank building. An early project for the student staffers was to produce a 90-minute audiotape detailing the region's history, which was narrated by Governor Mike Sullivan. The goal was to promote local tourism. Eventually Eric Wiltse succeeded Hacker at the Post. In 1991, Reader's Digest gave the Post a $2,000 grant to help pay fees like gas reimbursements and telephone bills. By 1993, circulation had declined to 500, including 150 copies distributed to students on campus. Only 36 local subscribers remained with the rest being out-of-town mail subscribers, indicting a lack of interest among area residents.

In 1994, school officials announced it was looking to either sell or close the Post in order to eliminate the 70-mile commute for students and potentially start an online newspaper covering Laramie. The digital paper was also seen as a cost cutting measure. UW offered to give the paper back to Roberts, but he never responded to their offer. In 1995, the Post was put up for sale for $1. Its coverage area then had a population of 1,830. However, the offer was rescinded after the school's lawyers informed Wiltse the paper could not legally be sold for $1 or given away, only sold by public auction as with other surplus property. Any purchase would only include the subscription list, business records and back issues, no equipment. The paper ceased publication on July 26, 1995.
