= The Sheridan Press =

Newspaper published in Sheridan, Wyoming

- Type: Daily newspaper
- Owner(s): Seaton Publishing Co, Inc.
- Founder: Thomas M. Cotton
- Managing editor: Ashleigh Snoozy
- Founded: 1887 (as the Sheridan Post)
- Language: English
- Headquarters: 144 Grinnell Plaza, Sheridan, WY 82801
- OCLC number: 22723737
- Website: thesheridanpress.com

The Sheridan Press is a daily newspaper published in Sheridan, Wyoming.

== History ==
On May 19, 1887, Thomas M. Cotton founded the Sheridan Post. In December 1887, F.V. Sommers and Thomas T. Tynan launched a rival paper called the Sheridan Enterprise. In August 1890, Tynan left the Enterprise. In October 1890, Cotton sold the Post to a company. In 1901, Emil F. Meyer sold the Enterprise to Fred J. Becker and Hayden M. White, who then consolidated it with The Dayton Harpoon.

In 1907, F.H. Barrow assumed control of the Enterprise, followed in May 1908 by G.L. Foster, and then in September 1908 by L.F. Hurd. In 1909, C.F. Story sold the Post to John F. Mills, who sold it a few years later. W.H. Huntley became Post editor at some point, but was replaced by Mills in 1908 after the paper was sold.

In 1911, Joseph J. Daly, after operating the Enterprise for two years, sold it to a syndicate headed by John B. Kendrick. Huntley eventually returned as Post editor, but was pushed out in 1912 after the other owners switched the publication's affiliation from Republican to the Bull Moose Party. Huntley resumed control of the Post in 1915, and switched its affiliation back to the GOP.

In 1918, C. Watt Brandon succeeded Huntley as editor of the Post, and a year later expanded it from a semi-weekly to a daily. In 1919, Evelyn B. Mason resigned as Enterprise editor and was succeeded by Everett J. Lippard. In 1923, Charles W. Barton, editor of the Casper Tribune, purchased the Post and the Enterprise. Barton then merged the two together to form the Sheridan Post-Enterprise. Lippard stayed on at the paper but died later that year at age 32. In 1925, Brandon founded the weekly Sheridan Journal.

In 1930, a group of investors led by Edward S. Moore, Sr. purchased the Post-Enterprise from Barton and the Journal from Brandon, and then merged the two to form the Sheridan Press. In 1944, Howard B. Sharp bought Moore's controlling interest, and then sold it in 1946 to Fred A. Seaton. In 1974, Seaton died. Ever since the Seaton family has continued to operate the Press under the company name Seaton Publishing Company.
