= Bonner County Daily Bee =

Newspaper in Sandpoint, Idaho, U.S.

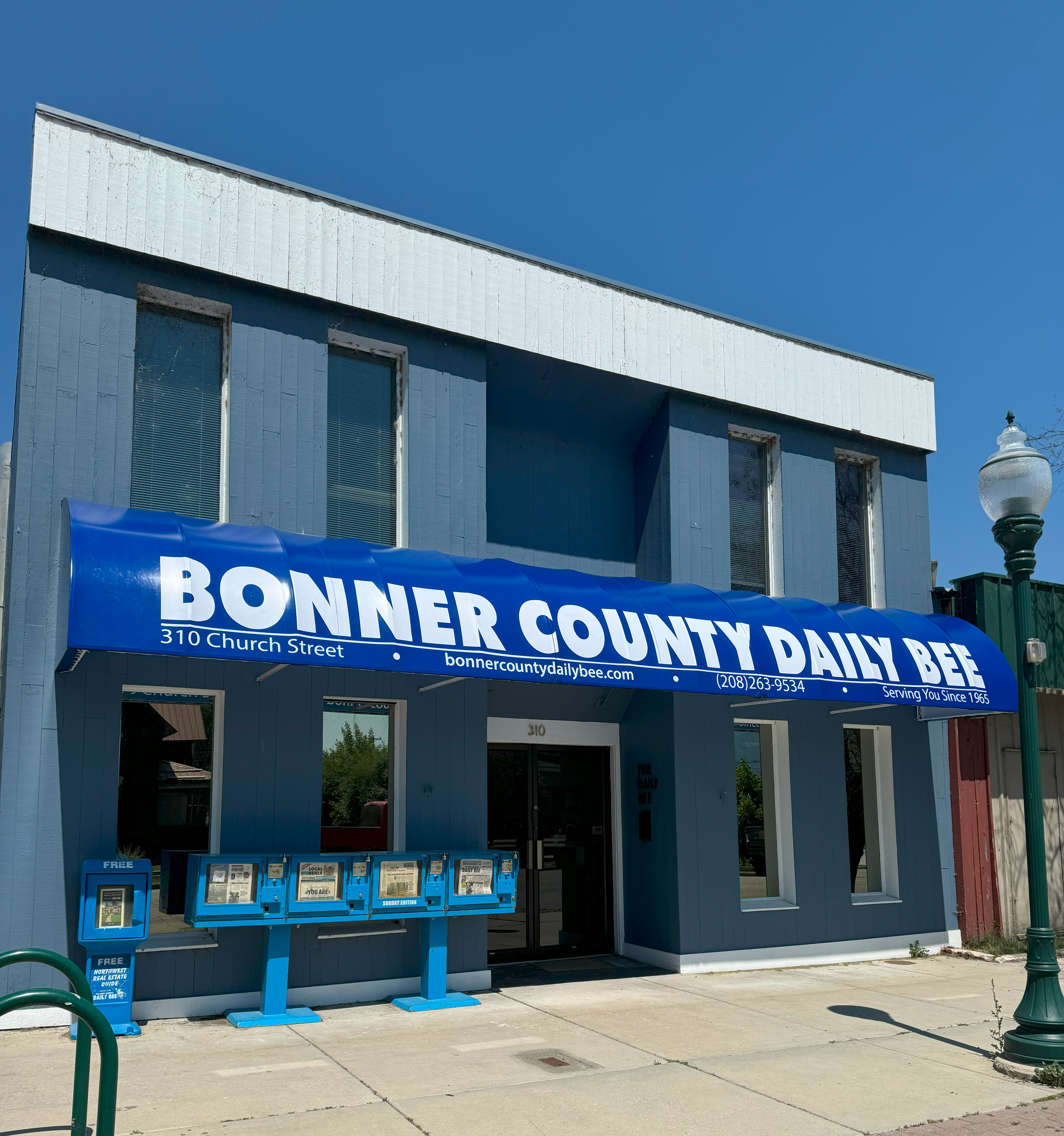
- Daily Bee office in Sandpoint, Idaho
- Type: Daily newspaper
- Format: Broadsheet
- Owner: Hagadone Media Group
- Publisher: Clint Schroeder
- Editor: Caroline Lobsinger
- Founded: 1965
- Language: English
- Headquarters: Sandpoint, Idaho
- Sister newspapers: Bonners Ferry Herald
- ISSN: 1047-6822
- OCLC number: 42853323
- Website: bonnercountydailybee.com

The Bonner County Daily Bee is a local daily newspaper based in Sandpoint, Idaho. It is owned by Hagadone Media Group.

== History ==
=== The News-Bulletin ===
In September 1924, Laurin E. Pietch and J.L. Stack founded a mimeographed daily newspaper in Sandpoint called the Daily Bulletin. It was a freesheet, which other local publishers at the time treated as a joke. At that time two other papers were published in Sandpoint.

Both the Daily Bulletin's founders previously worked at the Spokane Daily Chronicle and borrowed $500 to launch their paper. After four months, the Daily Bulletin began charging 25 cents a month for distribution. Pietch bought out Stack in February 1926 for $900, thus becoming the sole owner. Circulation averaged around 1,000.

J.G. Parsons, publisher of the weekly Pend d'Oreille Review, started a fourth daily paper in town. Pietch bought the two papers and consolidated the daily. The Bulletin expanded to a full-size four-page paper, complete with Associated Press wire service. Due to financial constraints, Pietch discontinued the Review in 1936 so he could focus on the Bulletin. That year, Charles E. Spoor bought a half-interest in the business, which he sold in December 1939 to S.O. Maxwell.

In January 1940, the paper went from daily to weekly print production and was renamed to the Sandpoint Bulletin. Pietch became a Navy recruiter in fall 1942. At that time S.V. Anderson took over as editor, assisted by Pietch's wife Jeanette. In 1944, W.A. Chubb acquired the Northern Idaho News and sixty days made a deal to merge it with the Bulletin to form The Sandpoint News-Bulletin. Gary L. Pietch joined his father on the paper's staff in 1958 and eventually took over as editor.

=== The Daily Bee ===
In 1961, Ernest Gale "Pete" and Adell "Dellie" Thompson moved from North Dakota to Coeur d'Alene, lured by a job at the Kootenai County Leader. Thompson moved to Sandpoint a short time later where he went to work for the News-Bulletin. He stayed until 1965 when he bought half interest in a local print shop. Thompson would soon buy the entire business, moved to a larger facility and renamed it to Pend Oreille Printers.

In June 1966, the Thompsons launched The Beehive in response to a move by the News-Bulletin for a key ad account held by Thompson's print shop. The paper's name from a comment made by their typesetter, Jeannie Hottel. "Call it the Beehive," she said. "You sure stirred up a hornet's nest." Initially,The Beehive was a freesheet with a circulation around 1,900. Thompson soon started charging two cents a copy to cover distribution.

In 1967, the Beehive was renamed to the Sandpoint Daily Bee. A year later the paper moved offices, added new equipment and contracted with United Press International. By March 1975, the Daily Bee had a circulation was around 2,500.

Thompson acquired the News-Bulletin in July 1975, Priest River Times in November 1976, and the Bonners Ferry Herald in December 1977. He sold his four papers in July 1984 to Duane Hagadone of Hagadone Media Group. The News-Bulletin was discontinued in October 1984 because its subscriptions numbers were in decline as the Daily Bee's numbers grew to over 5,000. In 1988, the Sandpoint Daily Bee was renamed to the Bonner County Daily Bee. In 2021, Hagadone died.
