= Bonners Ferry Herald =

Newspaper in Bonners Ferry, Idaho, U.S.

- Type: Weekly newspaper
- Owner: Hagadone Media Group
- Founder: Stephen D. Taylor,
- Managing editor: Caroline Lobsinger
- Founded: 1891
- Language: English
- Headquarters: 6811 S Main St, Bonners Ferry, ID 83805
- Sister newspapers: Bonner County Daily Bee
- Website: bonnersferryherald.com

The Bonners Ferry Herald is a weekly newspaper published in Bonners Ferry, Idaho. It is owned by Hagadone Media Group.

== History ==
On July 4, 1891, Stephen D. Taylor published the first edition of the Kootenai Herald in Kootenai, Idaho. Taylor relocated his printing plant to Bonners Ferry in January 1892. The paper was renamed to the Bonners Ferry Herald in December 1904. Taylor leased the paper to Bert Hall for three years followed by Charles W. King in 1912. King acquired full ownership at some point and Taylor died from blood poisoning in 1925.

King operated the Herald for three decades until he leased it in 1945 to Richard Meyers and two other men. In February 1946, Meyers and William A. Chubb, a co-owner of the Sandpoint News-Bulletin and previous owner of the Northern Idaho News, bought the Herald from King. Chubb soon sold his stake in the News-Bulletin.

In December 1977, Chubb sold the Herald to Pete Thompson, owner of Pend Oreille Printers, Inc. Thompson also owned the Bonner County Daily Bee, Priest River Times and Sandpoint News-Bulletin. In July 1984, Thompson sold his four papers to Duane Hagadone of Hagadone Media Group. The News-Bulletin was discontinued in October 1984. Hagadone died in 2021.
