= Teton Valley News =

Weekly newspaper published in Driggs, Idaho

- Type: Weekly newspaper
- Owner: Adams MultiMedia
- Founder: J. F. Blumer
- Publisher: Travis Quast
- Editor: Connor Shea
- Founded: 1909
- Language: English
- Headquarters: 75 N. Main St. Driggs, Idaho 83422
- City: Driggs, Idaho
- Circulation: 1,407 (as of 2021)
- ISSN: 0889-9851
- OCLC number: 13107316
- Website: tetonvalleynews.net

The Teton Valley News is a weekly newspaper published in Driggs, Idaho since 1909.

== History ==
The Teton Valley News was first published in 1909 by J. F. Blumer. Fritz C. Madsen published the paper for three decades and was known for using a rare typewriter with a linotype keyboard from Denmark where he was born and learned the craft. He bought the paper in 1911 and at one time was elected mayor of Driggs. He published the News until his death in 1941. In 1944, his widow Elsie Madsen sold the paper to Vic E. Lansberry. In 1957, Lansberry and his son James E. Lansberry bought The Caribou County Sun of Soda Springs.

In July 1971, George and Louisa Norton purchased the newspaper. He sold it in 1978 to Fred and Elizabeth McCabe, owners of the Jackson Hole Guide. In January 2006, Pioneer Newspapers of Seattle acquired the paper from Grand Teton News, a group of Wyoming family owners including Gary and Sue Stevenson; Robb and Jen Hicks; and Tom and Annie Mullen. Pioneer sold its papers to Adams Publishing Group in 2017.
