= Standard Journal =

Newspaper in Rexburg, Idaho

Rexburg Standard Journal
- Type: Twice weekly newspaper
- Format: Broadsheet
- Owner: Adams MultiMedia
- Publisher: Andy Pennington
- Editor: Jeremy Cooley
- Founded: 1887
- Language: English
- Headquarters: 23 S. 1st E. Rexburg, Idaho 83440 United States
- Circulation: 2,350 (as of 2021)
- ISSN: 1544-3639
- OCLC number: 52042753
- Website: rexburgstandardjournal.com

The Standard Journal is a newspaper based in Rexburg, Idaho. It publishes twice a week on Tuesdays and Fridays. The paper is a member of the Newspapers Association of Idaho.

== History ==
The Standard Journal has been published under various names since 1888. It was founded in 1887 as the Rexburg Press; it was later renamed the Silver Hammer and, in 1898, it was renamed Fremont County Journal. This paper evolved to become the Current-Journal. Because of its strong ties with the Church of Jesus Christ of Latter-day Saints, the Current-Journal was heavily criticized in the early 1900s by The Salt Lake Tribune, an anti-Mormon paper started by three excommunicated members of the Church.

In February 1908 Arthur Porter and his brother Frank acquired the Current-Journal. According to Arthur Porter, they printed the Current-Journal and later the Rexburg Journal, as it was later renamed in 1917, using one of the first printing presses in the west, known as the Prouty Power Press.

In January 1942, Arthur's son John C. Porter and his wife Annette purchased a competing paper called the Rexburg Standard. The Standard had been started as a Republican newspaper by William and Joseph Adams, who later brought James H. Wallis to a leadership role for the paper.

The newspaper, now the Standard Journal, remained in the hands of John C. Porter and eventually his son and daughter-in-law, Roger O. and Bernie Porter, until December 1999, when the Standard Journal was purchased by Pioneer News Group, a small family-owned media company composed of small- to medium-sized community newspapers throughout the Northwest.

In November 2017, the Standard Journal was purchased by Adams Publishing Group as part of its acquisition of the Pioneer Media Group media division.

== Notable coverage and national attention ==
An editorial in the Idaho State Times in 1974 called attention to the Standard Journal's reporting on magazine censorship in Rexburg. According to the author of the editorial, Rexburg's Prosecuting Attorney set up a committee to review and ban magazines they deemed as having objectionable content.

On June 5, 1976, the city of Rexburg was severely damaged when the Teton Dam collapsed and flooded the Teton Valley. The Standard Journal's printing equipment was destroyed when a wall of water 6 feet high passed through downtown Rexburg and flooded the building where the paper was published. Roger O. Porter, publisher of the Standard Journal, still published an edition of the paper three days later using the printing facilities at Ricks College (which later became BYU-Idaho). The paper's headline was "Devastating Flood Waters Can't Drown Our Spirits." Porter also documented the devastation by taking aerial photographs of the Teton Valley, many of which are now included in the book The Teton Dam Disaster. The Idaho Newspaper Association established a benefit fund for the paper, and Porter was able to secure Small Business Administration loans to rebuild the paper.

The city of Rexburg received international attention in 2008, one day after President Barack Obama's election, when the Standard Journal reported that school children riding the bus were chanting "assassinate Obama." The story was later voted as one of the "Top 10 stories in 2008 in the upper valley" by the editors and reporters for the Standard Journal.

The paper was cited by numerous papers in 2017 for its reporting on the lead-up to the full solar eclipse that year. The Standard Journal reported that the city of Rexburg's population was set to double on the day of the solar eclipse, due to its central viewing location.
