= Investor Services Journal =

- Editor: Roy Zimmerhansl
- Categories: Trade journal
- Frequency: Monthly
- Circulation: 30,000
- Publisher: 2i Media
- First issue: 2004
- Country: worldwide
- Language: English
- Website: ISJ.tv
- ISSN: 1744-151X

Investor Services Journal is a magazine covering the financial services industry specifically global custody, sub-custody, central depositories, clearing houses, securities lending and financing, mutual fund administration, hedge fund administration, private equity fund administration and prime brokerage.

The journal is intended for users of investor/securities services such as beneficial owners, asset managers, plan sponsors/pension fund trustees, hedge fund managers and regulators, as well as practitioners in the industry providing investor services such as custodians, fund administrators, securities lenders and borrowers and CTOs. The journal presents news and analysis on regulatory and commercial developments in the global investor services and wider back to middle office sector of financial institutions.

ISJ also hosts the Annual Investor Services Awards for the industry.

== Background ==
Investor Services Journal was founded in 2004 by Mark Latham, a media entrepreneur, of 2i Media. In 2008 Jon Hewson, a broadcasting senior executive, joined the board of 2i Media. In 2009 Roy Zimmerhansl became the Contributing Editor of Global Securities Lending, GSL.
