= Idaho State Journal =

Daily newspaper published in Pocatello, Idaho

- Empowering the Community

- Idaho State Journal building on Arthur Street in Pocatello, Idaho
- Type: Daily newspaper
- Format: Broadsheet
- Owner: Adams MultiMedia
- Founder: P.E. McCleliand
- Publisher: Travis Quast
- Managing editor: Ian Fennell
- Founded: 1889 (as The Idaho Republican)
- Language: English
- Headquarters: 305 South Arthur Avenue; PO Box 431; Pocatello, ID 83204; United States
- Circulation: 8,976 (as of 2021)
- OCLC number: 8801227
- Website: journalnet.com

The Idaho State Journal is daily newspaper published in Pocatello, Idaho, United States, that serves southeast Idaho, including Bannock, Bear Lake, Bingham, Caribou, Franklin, Power, and Oneida counties. The paper is owned by Adams MultiMedia.

== History ==
In July 1889, a group of Republicans in Pocatello, Idaho founded a periodical called The Idaho Republican. It was managed by P.E. McCleliand. In July 1890, W.C.B. Allen sold the Republican to a stock company, who renamed it to the Pocatello Tribune. The paper was then affiliated with the Independent Anti-Mormon Party of Oneida County.

George A. Robethan of Blackfoot, and Rep. Frank C. Ramsey of Cassia County became the proprietors in April 1891. Robethan left at some point and Ramsey sold the paper to C.E. Arney in January 1892. A fire destroyed the printing plant in July 1892. The paper ceased and was revived in August 1892 by F.W. Eldridge, co-owner of the Montpelier Observer. Arney stayed on as editor. Arney severed his ties to the Tribune that December, and it was purchased by George N. Ifft, William Wallin and C.H. Fernstermaker, of Salt Lake City. The Ifft family went on to operate the paper for three generations. On March 17, 1902, the Tribune expanded from a weekly to a daily.

In December 1923, Frank W. Brown, H.P. Pinkney and E.G. Frawley started the Idaho State Journal in Pocatello. Brown previously edited the Kearney Morning Times in Nebraska. The paper expanded from a weekly to a daily in December 1924. Ira H. Masters, who previously owned the Provo Herald and Twin Falls Times, acquired the Journal from Brown in March 1927.

At some point Tribune co-owner Fernstermaker sold out. In September 1930, Wallin sold his stake to O.S. Stauffer and William S. Cady. Masters sold the Journal to Arthur N. Suverkrup in September 1931. However, the mortgage was foreclosed and the business was sold at public auction. Masters was the only bidder and reacquired the paper for $22,000. He sold it again in November 1932 to the owners of the Tribune.

The Tribune carried on as an evening paper and Journal as a morning paper, with the Sunday edition called the Tribune-Journal. Due to paper shortages amid World War II, the Journal was suspended in October 1942. Cady sold his interest to Col. Millard Preston Goodfellow in August 1947 and joined Nicholas Ifft as co-owner. The paper's morning edition was revived in May 1948.

A year later Nicholas Ifft bought out Goodfellow and in September 1949 acquired a rival paper called the Pocatello Post. The Tribune and Post were then merged to form the Idaho State Journal. At that time a half-interest in the business called Tribune Journal Company was sold to Western Publishing Company, which was co-owned by Robert S. Howard, publisher of the Dalles Chronicle, and Scripps League Newspapers.

Howard served as publisher until he disposed of his interests in the joint venture in November 1955 so he could focus on establishing his own chain called Howard Publications. He was succeeded as publisher by Hugh Wagnon, followed by G. Nicholas Ifft III in December 1965, and Alvin H. Ricken in January 1966. Pioneer News Group split off from Scripps in December 1975 and acquired the company's stake in the Journal. G. Nicholas Ifft III retired from the Journal in May 1984 and sold his family's stake in the paper to Pioneer. Three decades later, Pioneer sold its papers to Adams Publishing Group in 2017.

== See also ==
- List of newspapers in Idaho
