= Lander Journal =

Newspaper in Lander, Wyoming

- Type: Bi-weekly newspaper
- Format: Broadsheet
- Owner: Edwards Group
- Publisher: Kevin Shields
- Founded: 1908 (as Wyoming State Journal)
- Language: English
- Headquarters: 332 Main St; Lander, WY 82520; United States
- Circulation: 4,004 Wednesday and Sunday (as of 2023)
- OCLC number: 12306180
- Website: rivertonranger.com/lander_journal/

The Lander Journal is a bi-weekly newspaper published in Lander, Wyoming.

== History ==
The paper has been in existence under different names since the early days of Lander, beginning around 1908. The name Lander Journal was adopted in the 1990s, but previously it was called the Wyoming State Journal and the Lander Wyoming State Journal.

In 1909, the Journal was expanded into a daily with John W. Cook as editor. Cook disposed of his interests in the paper in 1912, but resumed control in 1918. Cook died in January 1924. The paper was then acquired by Len L. Newton in May 1924, who sold it to his son Ernest L. Newton in 1938. The Newtown family bought and absorbed the Lander Evening Post in 1942.

The Journal was then purchased by Edward J. Breece in 1947, followed in 1956 by Roger D. Burdow, managing editor of the Ogden Standard Examiner. Burdow brought Bruce Kennedy on as partner in 1967. The two sold the paper in 1982 to Swift-Pioneer Newspapers, Inc. William "Bill" C. Sniffin stayed on as publisher and editor. In 1991, the Journal won third place in the National Newspaper Association contest for an investigative series on uranium miners. It was also nominated for a Pulitzer Prize.

In 1999, Steve Peck, owner of the Riverton Ranger, acquired the Lander Journal. A few years later Sniffin ran for governor. The Peck family managed the Journal until January 2022, when all of its publications were sold to Grace Andrus, a local financial adviser. However, a month after Andrus purchased the papers, they were sold again to the Edwards Group.

== See also ==
List of newspapers in Wyoming
