= Scripps League Newspapers =

American newspaper publisher (1921–1996)

Scripps League Newspapers, Inc. was a newspaper publishing company in the United States founded by Josephine Scripps in 1921 and managed beginning in 1931 by her son Ed Scripps (1909–1997). Based in Herndon, Virginia, the chain was separate from the larger E. W. Scripps Company begun by Ed's grandfather, Edward Willis Scripps.

The chain eventually grew to 51 small newspapers including The Daily Herald of Provo, Utah; Napa Valley Register of Napa, Calif.; Newport Daily Express of Newport, Vt., The Hanford Sentinel of Hanford, Calif., Arizona Daily Sun of Flagstaff, Ariz., and Haverhill Gazette in Massachusetts.

== History ==
In December 1975, Scripps League Newspapers spun off a number of numbers to form a new company called Pioneer Newspapers, Inc. (which later became Pioneer News Group). This enterprise would be owned and operated by James George Scripps, who was the brother of Scripps League chairman Edward W. Scripps.

In May 1976, the partnership between Scripps League Newspapers and Hagadone Newspapers Co. ended after 47 years. Hagadone purchased six newspapers and eleven became fully owned by Scripps.

Pulitzer Publishing Company bought Scripps League for about $230 million in 1996. In 2005, Lee Enterprises bought the Pulitzer newspaper division.
