= List of newspapers in Tennessee =

This is a list of newspapers in Tennessee, United States.

== Daily and nondaily newspapers ==
Title	Locale	Year est.	Frequency	Publisher/parent company	Notes
Advertiser News	Spring Hill		Weekly	GateHouse Media	
Ashland City Times	Ashland City		Weekly		
Buffalo River Review	Linden		Weekly or bi-weekly		
Camden Chronicle	Camden		Weekly		
Chattanooga Courier	Chattanooga		Weekly or bi-weekly		
Chattanooga Pulse	Chattanooga		Weekly or bi-weekly		
Chattanooga Times Free Press	Chattanooga	1869	Daily		Began as Times; merged with Free Press in 1999 to form Times Free Press
Citizen Tribune	Morristown	1966	Daily		
Cleveland Daily Banner	Cleveland	1854	Daily		
Commercial Appeal, The	Memphis	1840	Daily	USA Today Co.	
Covington Leader	Covington		Weekly		name changed to The Leader in 2007
Crockett Times, The	Crockett County		Weekly		
Crossville Chronicle	Crossville		Weekly or bi-weekly		
The Daily Beacon	Knoxville	1965	Weekly	Student-run at the University of Tennessee	Successor to The Orange and White
The Daily Herald	Columbia	1850	Daily	USA Today Co.	
Daily News, The	Memphis		Daily		
Daily News Journal, The	Murfreesboro		Daily	USA Today Co.	
Daily Post Athenian	Athens	1838			
Democratic-Union, The	Lawrenceburg	1884	bi-weekly		
Dresden Enterprise	Dresden	1883	Weekly	Magic Valley Publishing	
Dyersburg State Gazette	Dyersburg	1865	Weekly	Paxton Media Group	Oldest running business in Dyersburg, TN
Eagleville Times	Eagleville		Weekly or bi-weekly		
Elizabethton Star	Elizabethton		Weekly or bi-weekly		
Elk Valley Times	Fayetteville		Weekly or bi-weekly		
Gallatin News Examiner, The	Gallatin		Weekly		
Greenville Sun, The	Greeneville		Daily		
Grundy County Herald	Tracy City		Weekly or bi-weekly		
Herald & Tribune	Jonesborough		Weekly or bi-weekly		
Herald-Chronicle	Winchester		Weekly or bi-weekly		
Herald-Citizen	Cookeville		Daily		
Jackson Sun, The	Jackson		Daily	USA Today Co.	
Jasper Journal	Jasper		Weekly or bi-weekly		
Johnson City Press	Johnson City		Weekly or bi-weekly		
Kingsport Times-News	Kingsport		Daily		
Knoxville Daily Sun	Knoxville		Daily		
Knoxville Focus, The			Weekly or bi-weekly		
Knoxville News Sentinel	Knoxville	1886	Daily	USA Today Co.	Began as the Sentinel
La Prensa Latina	Memphis		Weekly or bi-weekly		
LaFolette Press	LaFolette		Weekly or bi-weekly		
Lawrence County Advocate	Lawrenceburg	1986	Bi-weekly		
Leaf-Chronicle	Clarksville	1808	Daily	USA Today Co.	
Lebanon Democrat	Lebanon		Daily		
Lee Clarion	Cleveland		Weekly or bi-weekly		
Manchester Times	Manchester		Weekly or bi-weekly		
Maryville Daily Times	Maryville		Daily		
McNairy County News	Selmer		Weekly or bi-weekly		
Memphis Daily News	Memphis		Weekly or bi-weekly		
Memphis Flyer	Memphis		Weekly or bi-weekly		
Memphis Tri-State Defender	Memphis	1951	Weekly or bi-weekly		
Monroe County Advocate & Democrat	Sweetwater		Weekly or bi-weekly	Adams Publishing Group	
Mt. Juliet Chronicle	Mount Juliet		Weekly or bi-weekly		
Mountain Press, The	Sevierville				
Murfreesboro Post	Murfreesboro		Weekly		
Murfreesboro Vision	Murfreesboro		Weekly or bi-weekly		
Nashville City Paper	Nashville		Weekly or bi-weekly		
Nashville Dispatch	Nashville	Before 1865	Daily		
Nashville Ledger	Nashville		Weekly or bi-weekly		
Nashville Medical News	Nashville		Weekly or bi-weekly		
Nashville Pride	Nashville		Weekly or bi-weekly		
Nashville Scene	Nashville		Weekly or bi-weekly		
Nashville Times and True Union	Nashville	1862	Daily		
Newport Plain Talk	Newport		Weekly or bi-weekly	Adams Publishing Group	
Oak Ridger, The	Oak Ridge		Daily	USA Today Co.	
Out & About Newspaper	Nashville		Weekly or bi-weekly		
Paris Post-Intelligencer	Paris		Daily		
Portland Sun	Portland		Weekly or bi-weekly		
Roane County News	Kingston		Weekly or bi-weekly		
Rutherford Reader, The	Murfreesboro		Weekly or bi-weekly		
Savannah Courier	Savannah		Weekly or bi-weekly		
Sewanee Mountain Messenger	Sewanee		Weekly or bi-weekly		
South Pittsburg Hustler	South Pittsburg		Weekly or bi-weekly		
Southern Standard	McMinnville		Weekly or bi-weekly		
Tennessee Star Journal	Pigeon Forge		Weekly or bi-weekly		
Tennessee Tribune	Nashville	1992	Weekly or bi-weekly		
Tennessean, The	Nashville	1907	Daily	USA Today Co.	Began as Nashville Whig in 1812; later became Nashville American
Times Gazette	Shelbyville		Daily		
Tullahoma News and Guardian	Tullahoma		Daily		
Union City Daily Messenger	Union City		Daily		
Vanderbilt Hustler, The	Nashville	1888	Weekly or bi-weekly	Student-run at Vanderbilt University	
Weakley County Press	Martin		Weekly or bi-weekly		
Williamson Herald	Franklin		Weekly		
Wilson Post	Lebanon		Weekly or bi-weekly		
Winchester Herald-Chronicle	Winchester		Weekly or bi-weekly		

== Defunct ==
Title	Locale	Year est.	Year ceased	Notes
Afro – American Sentinel	Jackson	1890	1891?	
Brownlow's Whig	Knoxville	1849	1871	Began in 1839 in Elizabethton
Chattanooga Blade	Chattanooga			
Chattanooga Daily Rebel	Chattanooga			
Chattanooga Evening News	Chattanooga	1888		Became Chattanooga News-Free Press in 1940, Chattanooga Free Press in 1993, and Chattanooga Times Free Press in 1999
The Chattanooga Star	Chattanooga	1907	1908	
Chattanooga Times	Chattanooga	1869	1999	
The Commercial Bulletin	Jackson	1880		
Knoxville Gazette	Knoxville	1792	1818	
Knoxville Journal	Knoxville		1991	
Knoxville Negro World	Knoxville			
Linden Mail	Linden	1890s	1910s	
Linden Times	Linden	1880	1883	
Memphis Avalanche	Memphis	1866	1885	
Memphis Daily Appeal	Memphis	1847	1886	
Memphis Daily Commercial	Memphis	1889	1891	
Memphis Daily Scimitar	Memphis	1881		Became News Scimitar in 1907, Memphis Press-Scimitar in 1926
Memphis Free Speech	Memphis	1888		
Memphis Morning News	Memphis	1902	1904	
Memphis Post	Memphis	1866	1869	
Memphis Press-Scimitar	Memphis	1926	1983	
Memphis World	Memphis	1931	1972	
Nashville American	Nashville			
Nashville Banner	Nashville	1876	1998	
The Nashville City Paper	Nashville	2000	2013	
Nashville Globe	Nashville	1906	1960	
Nashville Union and American	Nashville	1853	1875	Also published as the Daily Union and American and Nashville Union and Dispatch
The Perry Countian	Linden	1924s	1978	Merged with the Buffalo River Review
Republican Banner	Nashville	1837?	1875	Merged with the Nashville Union and American to form The American
Review Appeal	Franklin	1813		
Tennessee Staatszeitung	Nashville	1866	187?	
The Union Flag	Jonesborough	1865	1873	
Wochenblatt der Tennessee Staatszeitung	Nashville	1867	1867	

== See also ==
- Tennessee media
  - List of radio stations in Tennessee
  - List of television stations in Tennessee
  - Media of cities in Tennessee: Chattanooga, Knoxville, Memphis, Murfreesboro, Nashville
- Journalism:
  - Category:Journalists from Tennessee
  - University of Memphis Department of Journalism
  - Southern Adventist University School of Journalism and Communication, in Collegedale
- Tennessee literature
U.S. newspapers

Comprehensive

- Lists of newspapers
- List of newspapers in the United States

Frequency

- List of free daily newspapers in the United States
- List of weekly newspapers in the United States

Circulation

- List of international newspapers originating in the United States
- List of national newspapers in the United States
- List of newspapers in the United States by circulation
- List of newspapers serving cities over 100,000 in the United States

Foreign language

- List of French-language newspapers published in the United States
- List of German-language newspapers published in the United States
- List of Spanish-language newspapers published in the United States

Specialty

- List of African-American newspapers in the United States
- List of alternative weekly newspapers in the United States
- List of business newspapers in the United States
- List of family-owned newspapers in the United States
- List of Jewish newspapers in the United States
- List of LGBTQ periodicals in the United States
- List of student newspapers in the United States
- List of supermarket tabloids in the United States
- List of underground press in the United States

Other

- List of defunct newspapers of the United States

== Bibliography ==
- S. N. D. North; United States Department of the Interior (1884). "Catalogue of Periodical Publications: Tennessee". History and Present Condition of the Newspaper and Periodical Press of the United States. Washington, D.C.: Government Printing Office. OCLC 1850475. (+ List of titles 50+ years old)
- "Press of East Tennessee". East Tennessee: Historical and Biographical. Chattanooga: A.D. Smith & Co. 1893. pp. 157–172. hdl:2027/wu.89077948958. ISBN 9781403500816.
- James T. Haley, ed. (1895), "Newspapers: Tennessee", Afro-American Encyclopaedia, Mind and matter, Nashville: Haley & Florida, hdl:2027/inu.30000029292855, OCLC 219597043
- "Tennessee". American Newspaper Directory. New York: George P. Rowell. 1900. pp. 985+. hdl:2027/umn.31951002273861a – via HathiTrust.
- "Tennessee". American Newspaper Annual & Directory. Philadelphia: N. W. Ayer & Son. 1922. pp. 935+. hdl:2027/umn.31951001295695n.
- Federal Writers' Project (1939). "Writers of Tennessee". Tennessee: A Guide to the State. American Guide Series. New York: Viking Press. pp. 145–154. OCLC 2479491.
- Thomas D. Clark (1948). Southern Country Editor. Bobbs-Merrill. OCLC 525858. (Includes information about weekly rural newspapers in Tennessee)
- G. Thomas Tanselle (1971). "General Studies: Tennessee". Guide to the Study of United States Imprints. Harvard University Press. p. 881. ISBN 978-0-674-36761-6. (Includes information about newspapers)
- Jack Mooney, ed., A History of Tennessee Newspapers (1996)
