= Daily Times =

Daily Times may refer to the following national newspapers:

- Daily Times (Nigeria), newspaper published in Nigeria
- Daily Times (Pakistan), newspaper published in Pakistan

The Daily Times may refer to the following newspapers:

- The Daily Times (Malawi), newspaper published in Malawi
- The Daily Times (Salisbury, Maryland), newspaper published in Salisbury, Maryland, USA
- The Daily Times (New Philadelphia, Ohio), newspaper published in New Philadelphia, Ohio, USA; merged into The Times-Reporter
- The Daily Times (Pryor), newspaper published in Pryor, Oklahoma, USA
- The Daily Times, Beaver and Rochester, newspaper published in Pennsylvania, USA; absorbed by The Beaver County Times
- The Daily Times (Blount County, Tennessee), newspaper published in Maryville, near Knoxville, USA

Other newspapers with titles containing Daily Times include:

- Otago Daily Times, newspaper published in Dunedin, New Zealand
- East Anglian Daily Times, newspaper published in Ipswich, East Anglia, UK
- Longmont Daily Times-Call, newspaper published in Longmont, Colorado, USA
- Pekin Daily Times, newspaper published in Pekin, Illinois, USA
- Davenport Daily Times, newspaper published in Davenport, Iowa, USA
- Glasgow Daily Times, newspaper published in Glasgow, Kentucky, USA
- Gloucester Daily Times, newspaper published in Gloucester, Massachusetts, USA
- Daily Times Chronicle (formerly the Woburn Daily Times), newspaper published in Woburn, Massachusetts, USA
- Crookston Daily Times, newspaper published in Crookston, Minnesota, USA
- Farmington Daily Times, newspaper published in Farmington, New Mexico, USA
- Watertown Daily Times, newspaper published in Watertown, New York, USA
- Portsmouth Daily Times, newspaper published in Portsmouth, Ohio, USA
- Centre Daily Times, newspaper published in State College, Pennsylvania, USA
- Delaware County Daily Times, newspaper published in Upper Darby Township, Delaware County, Pennsylvania, USA
- Watertown Daily Times, newspaper published in Watertown, Wisconsin, USA
