= Frederick Sasscer High School =

School in Maryland, United States

Coordinates: 38.8153°N 76.7595°W

Frederick Sasscer High School, also known as Frederick Sasscer Junior/Senior High School (FSHS), was a mid-20th century secondary school located at 14201 School Lane, Upper Marlboro, Prince George's County, Maryland, United States of America. FSHS's historical importance and its character lie in its centuries-old roots in the Town of Upper Marlboro, Maryland.

== The early days: Colonial times - 1948 ==
=== Early schools ===
The economic mix of the population around Upper Marlboro gave rise to a range of different educational arrangements: church schools, local schools organized by towns or groups of parents (including private academies), tuition schools organized by "traveling schoolmasters", charity schools for the poor, boarding schools for the rich, "dame schools" run by women in their homes, and private tutoring and home schooling.

In Upper Marlboro, the privately funded Upper Marlborough Academy (a/k/a Upper Marlboro Academy, Marlboro Academy) was established in 1835. The school consisted of two rooms--one serving as the school room and one as a bedroom for the teacher. At the beginning, the school was restricted to boys with girls allowed to attend by 1840. In 1844, 42 boys and 18 girls attended. In 1867, a girls' building was added. As early as 1839, subjects ("branches") taught were: "Latin and Greek languages; Greek and Roman antiquities; Elements of General History; Natural Philosophy and Chemistry; Rhetoric, Arithmetic, Algebra, Geometry, and Trigonometry; Mensuration (measuring), Navigation, and Surveying; [as well as] all the lower branches of English education".

In 1840, by act of the Maryland legislature, the academy became publicly funded. In 1908, the Marlboro Academy building was transferred to the Board of County School Commissioners, and the private academy became a public high school. A new high school building would be constructed at the location some 12+ years later.

=== The move toward common schools ===
Maryland was a relative latecomer to a central system of public education. After several failed attempts, in 1865, Maryland moved from local schools to a highly centralized, compulsory school system consisting of "free primary schools, grammar schools, one high school per county, a normal school, and a university, as well as separate schools for Negroes, the blind, deaf, handicapped, and the imprisoned". Funding sources were different for white and black schools, with funding for the latter to be derived from taxes paid by blacks. Public funding for private academies continued only until public high schools could be established.

Frederick Sasscer Jr., who was Superintendent of Schools for Prince George's County from 1902 until 1914, commented in 1920 about the new Marlboro High School (a/k/a Upper Marlborough High School) being built on the site of the Marlboro Academy: "May the new High School building soon to be erected embody in its conveniences all the comforts of the new age, and may the children of the present generation and of generations to come find keen delight and rich enlightenment within its walls!" On March 12, 1921, the new Marlboro High School, built on the site of the former Marlboro Academy, was reported as completed. On May 19, 1921, the new school was dedicated.

The Marlboro High School, and the Marlboro Academy before it, laid the educational foundation for the FSHS, which would be built several decades later. After that, the Marlboro High School building was used as a primary school, known as Marlboro Elementary School, until 1974.

== Frederick Sasscer High School (1948 – early 1970s) ==
=== Site ===
FSHS was built west-southwest of Upper Marlboro's CBD just within the current town limits, The property "was purchased for the new Marlboro High School in 1945". FSHS was constructed on this land in 1947 and opened in 1948 to address overcrowding at Marlboro High School, with the dedication occurring on June 16, 1949. The school was named after the previously noted school superintendent Frederick Sasscer Jr.. Sasscer also served as principal of the predecessor Marlboro Academy, was a lawyer, and served as editor of the Prince George's Enquirer and its successor Enquirer Gazette, which still exists today. The Sasscers were prominent nineteenth-century landowners in Upper Marlboro. Their roots in the town can be traced to the 1760s.

=== Building ===
It was 1944, nearing the end of World War II, and Prince George's County officials were already thinking about the need for new schools to accommodate pent-up demand and, perhaps, anticipating the coming "baby boom". A school construction program was to be launched "as soon as materials are available" to deal with the many "overcrowded and 'antiquated'" schools in the county. One of these planned projects was a "new junior-senior high school at Upper Marlboro to accommodate about 350 pupils." In Upper Marlboro, that project would materialize as Frederick Sasscer High School.

By mid-1946, an artist's conception of the proposed "New Marlboro High School" or "Marlboro Junior and Senior High School" had been approved. The new school was to "include 10 classrooms, an auditorium, gymnasium, cafeteria and library" for an approximate cost of $500,000. The school's plans were delayed by the Civilian Production Administration, an American federal agency created in 1945 to oversee the transition from the wartime to peacetime economy, "because of a lack of building materials".

A $2.2-million bond issue was requested on June 11, 1947, to fund construction of the now-named Frederick Sasscer High School and other new schools in the county. On July 9, 1947, the opening date for receipt bids for FSHS was set for August 12, 1947. By that time, the planned number of classrooms had been increased from 10 to 14, along with an auditorium, gymnasium, and cafeteria, and the school was to be constructed of brick and concrete block. Notice was given that bids would be opened on August 26, 1947. The bids, as received, were "considerably higher than expected", with the school superintendent suggesting that the cost should be some $100,000 less. On September 24, 1947, the FSHS construction contract was awarded to Irons & Reynolds for $976,747. Announcement was made that FSHS would be completed on or about December 1, 1948.

"Marlboro's $1,000,000 Frederick Sasscer high school" was dedicated in ceremonies on June 16, 1949. The principal speaker was United States Representative Lansdale Sasscer of Maryland, who was the son of Frederick Sasscer Jr., for whom FSHS was named. Sasscer noted that "completion of the new school was a perfect example of the 'booster' spirit needed in every community". A total pupil enrollment of 530 was expected by September 1949, with service to students of "Upper Marlboro, Croom, Forestville and intermediate areas". As completed, FSHS had 19 classrooms, up from 10 in early planning and from 14 in later plans. The auditorium, gymnasium, library, and cafeteria were also built as planned. With the opening of FSHS, the old Marlboro High School was to be converted into an elementary school.

In its early years, FSHS was one of only two schools in the county that had an auditorium and a gymnasium. The auditorium, which had a stage with public address system, props, dressing rooms, and "elaborate" lighting system, could seat about 500 people.

When the Frederick Douglass High School (FDHS) opened in 1960 to accommodate black students, the former building, which had first been known as the Marlboro Colored School (a/k/a Marlboro Colored High School), was unoccupied. When FSHS needed expansion space to accommodate its growing student population, and before its addition was constructed in 1962, the old FDHS was repurposed into what was known as the FSHS Annex, to which FSHS students were shuttled to and from the main building by school bus. Later, the building was again repurposed, this time into the Prince George's County Board of Education administration building. In 1982, the building was demolished. Some sources report that the old FDHS had been directly converted into the Board of Education building in 1960, but this claim does not recognize that the building had been first used as the FSHS Annex after FDHS opened.

=== Catchment area ===
In FSHS's early days, students were drawn from almost half of Prince George's County, geographically "from Glenn Dale to Forestville to Brandywine". Students matriculated from as close as the Marlboro elementary and high schools, located a few blocks away, to as far as Mullikin Elementary School, some 10 miles distant. As the county grew and experienced population shifts, FSHS's catchment area changed. For example, as the more northerly parts of the country developed, DuVal High School in Glenn Dale was opened in 1960 to accommodate student population growth and, later, Largo High School in Largo was built. When Belair at Bowie was established in the early 1960s, students attended FSHS until Bowie High School opened in 1965.

As the years went by, FSHS's students were moved to these and other newer schools elsewhere in the county until the FSHS facility was no longer needed as a school.

== Liminal period (early 1970s to 2006) ==
As FSHS wound down as a high school, students in grades 9 through 12 were dispersed to other Prince George's County schools including Bowie High School (in Bowie, Maryland), Largo High School (in Largo, Maryland), Frederick Douglass High School (the formerly all black school in nearby Croom, Maryland), and DuVal High School (in Lanham, Maryland). In the late 1970s, the former FSHS building was repurposed as the Sasscer Administration Building, the headquarters of the Prince George's County Board of Education.

For the next three decades, there was no high school located in Upper Marlboro, proper. As most population growth was concentrated in central Prince George's County east of the Capital Beltway as contrasted to south county and further from Washington, DC, during this period, school construction was focused on the areas of most growth.

== New(est) Marlboro high school: The Dr. Henry A. Wise Jr. High School (2006–Present) ==
In 2006, a new high school, tentatively dubbed "the new Upper Marlboro high school" was opened. But the new school could not have been more different from FSHS or its predecessor schools in Upper Marlboro in terms of location, culture, original demographics, size, or cost. Dr. Henry A. Wise Jr. High School (HWHS), as the newer school was named, is discussed in some detail here for comparison and contrast between past and the present education systems in this part of Prince George's County.

First, HWHS is not located in the Town of Upper Marlboro. Although the school carries an Upper Marlboro mailing address, it is located at 12650 Brooke Lane, outside of the town limits in unincorporated Prince George's County some three miles from the town's CBD. The cultural ties to Upper Marlboro are very different from those of FSHS and its predecessor schools to the extent that such ties exist at all today.

Reflecting the broader demographic changes in Prince George's County, when the new school was built to serve students in the Upper Marlboro area, the school was named after Henry A. Wise Jr., a war hero as a World War II pilot with the Tuskegee Airmen and the first black physician to practice at Prince George's Hospital Center. Dr. Wise was born and raised in Cheriton, Virginia, and lived in Lanham and Bowie. There was no evidence that he had ties to the Upper Marlboro area.

When HWHS was built, the Washington Post noted that it "far surpasses the other 21 major high school campuses in the county". The building provided:

a 5,000-seat gymnasium (larger than any other in the county school system), an indoor track circling the gym's upper level, an auxiliary gym, a 950-seat performing arts center with box seating designed in an acoustic-enhancing style similar to the Music Center at Strathmore in North Bethesda, an intimate black box theater, a weight room, a cardio fitness room, a mirrored dance room, an aerobics room, a band room, a vocal music room, three lecture halls, three computer labs (each with 30 new Dell desktops), a greenhouse and more. Lots more. That is what $92 million can buy."

HWHS has a much wider program offering than did mid-century schools in Upper Marlboro, including FSHS. FSHS's program offerings were more limited: academic, business/commercial, vocational, and general.

When HWHS opened, Prince George's County School Superintendent John E. Deasy commented that the new school was both "an opportunity and a challenge—an opportunity to start a new high school's culture from scratch, a challenge to establish academic standards on par with the extraordinary physical structure of the campus", continuing that "[i]t's not about the space ... [i]t's about what they do with the space".
