= Mullikin Elementary School (Mitchellville, Maryland) =

School in Maryland, United States

Coordinates: 38.92459°N 76.74181°W

Mullikin Elementary School was an early- to mid-20th century primary/grade school (Grades 1–6) located on Mt. Oak Road in Mitchellville, Prince George's County, Maryland, USA. The school served the local community from in or about 1919 until the end of the 1963–64 school year when pupils were transferred to the then new Woodmore Elementary School. Mullikin Elementary School is historically notable, locally and regionally. It was named after the Mullikin Family—James and his five succeeding generations—who owned the Mullikin's Delight plantation. Mullikin's Delight comprised the general area long ago known as Mullikin and in which Mullikin Elementary School once stood in Mitchellville, Prince George's County, Maryland USA. The significance of Mullikin's Delight is that it is listed as a Prince George's County historical site, with references to the family name and the fact that it was a slaveholding plantation, by the Maryland-National Capital Park and Planning Commission and noted in other historical pieces. Tying the history of the Mullikin family and Mullikin's Delight with Mullikin Elementary School, Washington Post newspaper columnist Eugene Meyer described in his April 6, 1996 article, "In a tale of two Mitchellvilles, similarities end with the name," a family currently living in "...Mullikin, [named] after the family for which a nearby school was named."

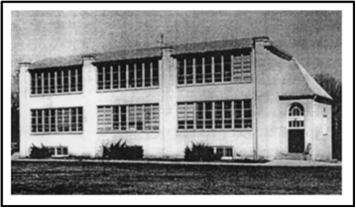
Mullikin Elementary School

Mullikin Elementary was a three-story, concrete building with two stories above ground and one partially below ground level. On the upper two floors, the building housed six classrooms—one for each of the six grades—as well as the administrative office (e.g. principal, secretary). There was a basement that ran the full length of the building. In 1945, Federal Works Agency funds were used to build out the basement into an auditorium and cafeteria. The basement floor also housed a small school library, girls' and boys' restrooms, and a mechanical room. Outside, there was a playground and large open area.

Mullikin Elementary was a successor school to the one-room Cherry Hill School that served local pupils from 1874 to 1919. When Mullikin Elementary School replaced the Cherry Hill School, the school bell which rang from Cherry Hill's bell tower was installed on the second floor ceiling of the northern stairwell of Mullikin Elementary (left side of the photograph), where it rang until replaced by an electric bell to call pupils, who were outside of the building, to come inside.

Many of the students from Mullikin, upon completing grade 6, matriculated to Frederick Sasscer High School in Upper Marlboro, Maryland.

Close by the school stood a small post office; an American Railway Express station next to a railroad track and, earlier, a hotel, a blacksmith shop, and a meeting hall/polling place. In the early 1970s, a fire broke out in what had been the Mullikin Elementary building, leading to its eventual demolition. The land where Mullikin Elementary, the post office and other buildings stood is now a Prince George's County school bus lot with no markers showing the history of the school.
