= Key West Citizen =

Newspaper in Key West, Florida

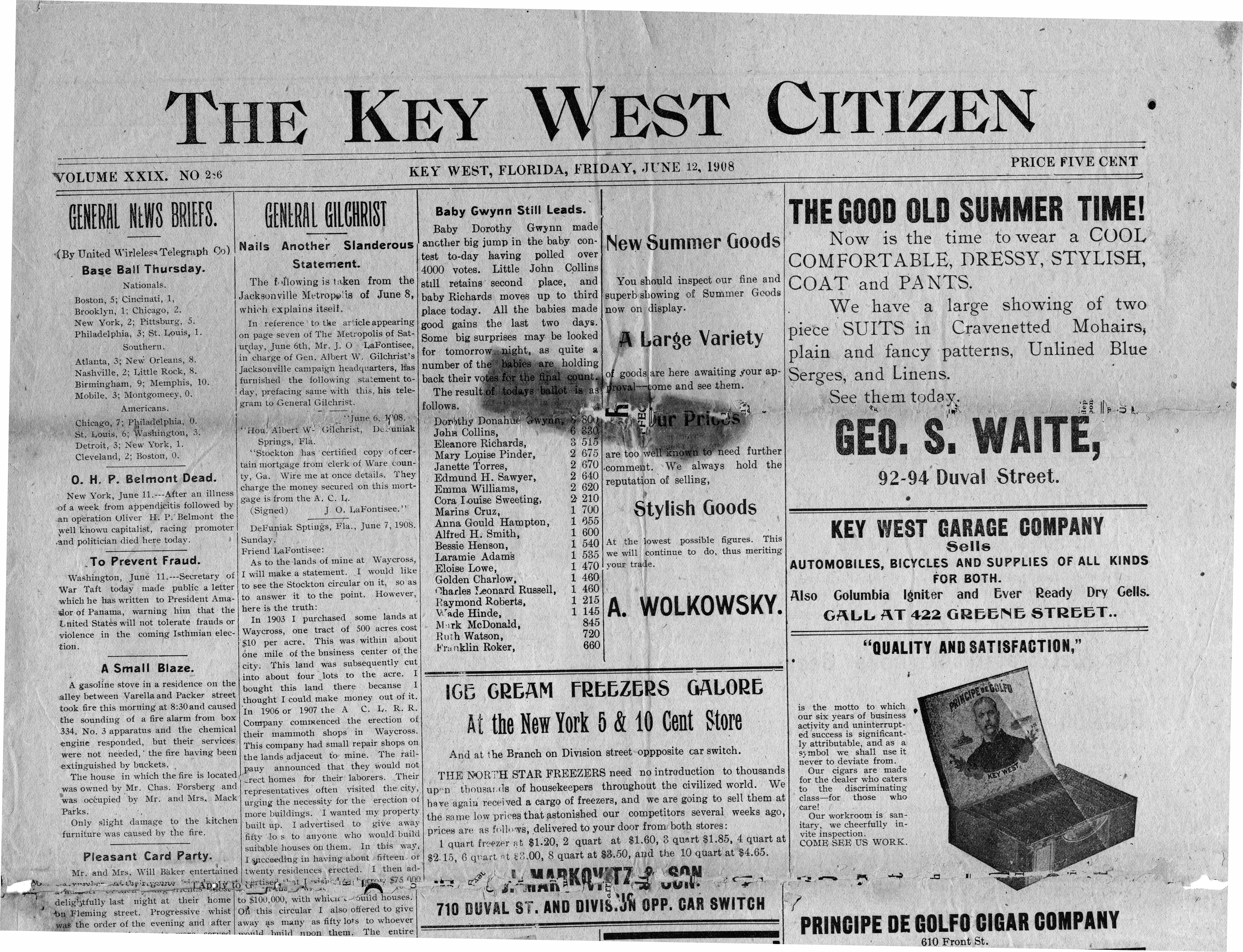
- 1908 copy of the Key West Citizen
- Type: Daily newspaper
- Format: Broadsheet
- Owner: Adams Publishing Group
- Publisher: Kevin Smith
- Language: English
- Headquarters: Key West, Florida, U.S.
- Circulation: 5,500
- Sister newspapers: Florida Keys Free Press
- ISSN: 2641-6174
- OCLC number: 2701762
- Website: www.keysnews.com

The Key West Citizen is a daily newspaper published in Key West, Florida. The newspaper is the result of the amalgamations of several related publications in the early years of the 20th century, becoming the Key West Citizen on April 29, 1905, when the first weekly edition rolled off the presses at 534 Front St. announcing the coming of Flagler's Overseas Railroad to Key West.

== History ==
=== 1800s ===
The common thread running through the various incarnations dating back 128 years is Walter Willard Thompson, who gained prominence as the editor of the historic weekly Key of the Gulf. Born in Key West, Florida in 1875, Thompson began his newspaper career as a carrier at age 12, becoming the editor of the third incarnation of the Key of the Gulf shortly before the turn of the century.

This paper was Democratic in its political leanings, but vowed in its editorial pages not to "take up personal differences between the members of different parties, or to shoulder the political fights of any man or men, when they are made for personal reasons". The paper's ultimate aim, was "the advancement of the interests of Key West and Monroe County". A few years later, newspaperman T. J. Appleyard bought the Key West Herald, a weekly organized by a number of citizens five years previously, and then swallowed Thompson's Key to the Gulf, around 1900. He combined those two papers into the Inter-Ocean, described during its five-year run as a "high-class fearless daily".

Late in 1900, it was Thompson's turn to take over the Inter-Ocean, which he continued publishing until its eventual demise in 1906.

=== 1900s ===
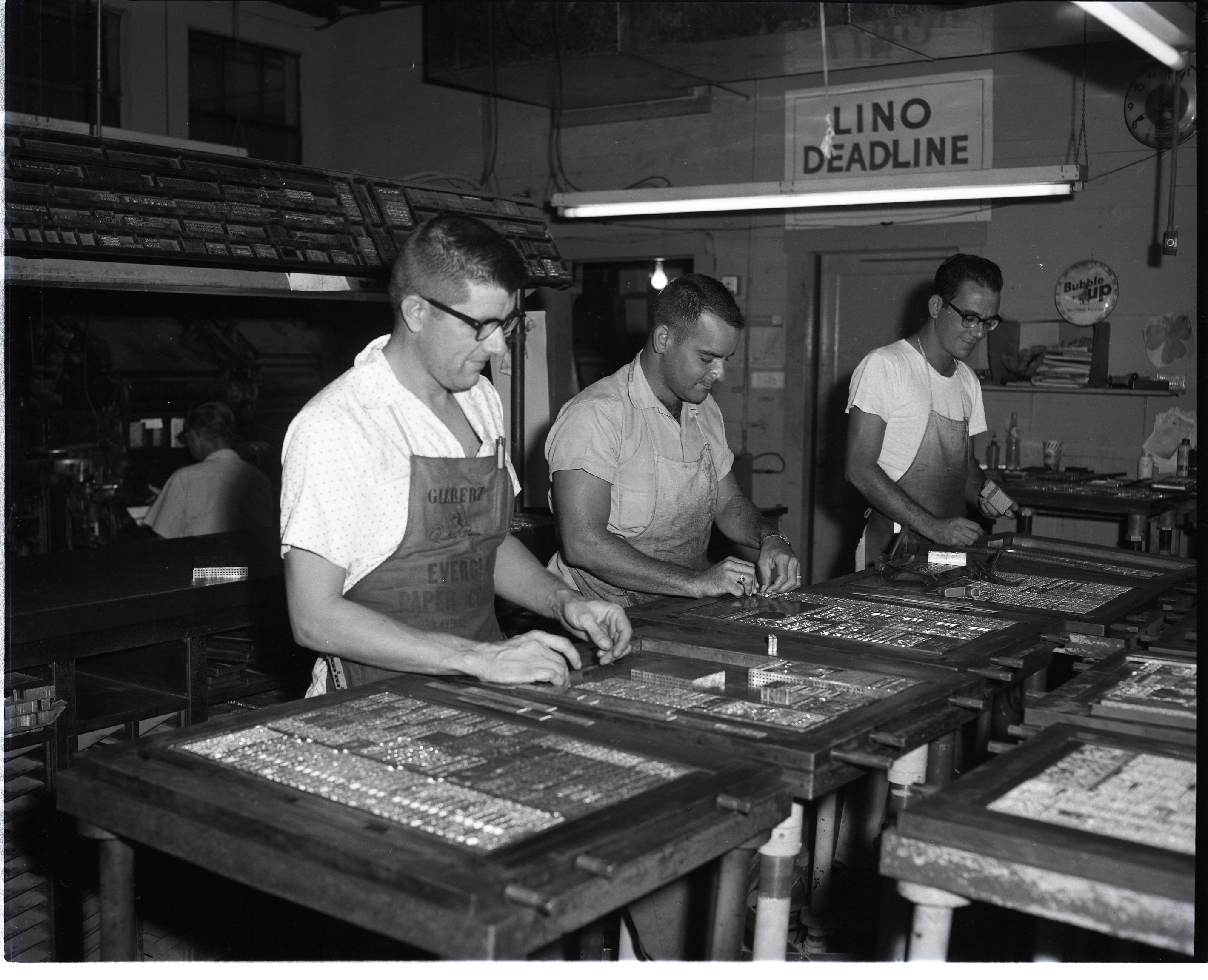
Working the Key West Citizen printing press room, early 1960s

In 1904, a small paper called The Citizen appeared as a weekly, but only lasted for a few months before being bought by Walter Thompson's cousin, Thomas Treason Thompson, and his business partner, Macy B. Darnall. The pair changed the name to the Key West Citizen and continued to operate it as a weekly newspaper.

By 1906, both camps decided they should consolidate all their newspaper holdings and, on November 1 of that year, a new paper, the six-day-per-week afternoon edition Key West Citizen was formed through the amalgamation of the weekly Citizen and the Inter-Ocean. Each founding publisher was allotted a one-third interest in the new company, Citizen Publishing.

This arrangement continued until 1912, the year the railroad finally arrived in Key West. By then, Walter Thompson had decided to leave newspapers entirely and the three sold the Key West Citizen, now located in its Front Street offices, to the famed Artman family patriarch L.P. Artman Sr. for $100,000, changing the focus and journalistic style almost immediately.

"In the old days, there would be more national news, because everybody would know the local news before it got to press," said Florida Keys historian Tom Hambright. "But as the Artman era started, he believed that if you mentioned lots of local names you'd sell papers. So you had all the babies and everything."

The paper was also modernized almost immediately, as Artman set about trying to find a Linotype machine.

"My grandfather, L.P. senior went to New Orleans to buy the machine but found that he didn't have the money," said grandson Greg Artman, a retired Monroe County sheriff's deputy. "But then he saw a friend who said, remember that ring you bought in Paris? He pawned the ring to his friend, bought the machine and The Citizen got modernized."

Walter W. Thompson, who can be considered the spiritual "founding father" of the Key West Citizen, died on July 13, 1929, in Key West.

For a while after the Artman purchase, the paper moved to a small space between Sloppy Joe's Bar and the Old City Hall, but space issues necessitated another move across the street to its long term home at 515 Greene St. in 1934.

When L.P. Artman died in 1954, his son, Norman D. Artman, took over as publisher of the paper.

It was Norman Artman who decided in 1957 to discontinue the Saturday Key West Citizen, replacing it with a Sunday edition. Though he professed interest in keeping the paper in the family, he sold it - and the Artman Press, which handled commercial printing jobs - to Charles D. Morris for $2.5 million in 1968.

Morris represented the Southeastern Newspapers Corp., which owned papers in Athens, Savannah and Augusta, Georgia. Artman agreed to stay on as publisher.

By 1974, the Key West Citizen was once again for sale, and this time, the buyers were Canadians.

Thomson Newspapers, headquartered in Toronto, added the daily to its small-town newspaper empire, and proceeded to change it beyond recognition.

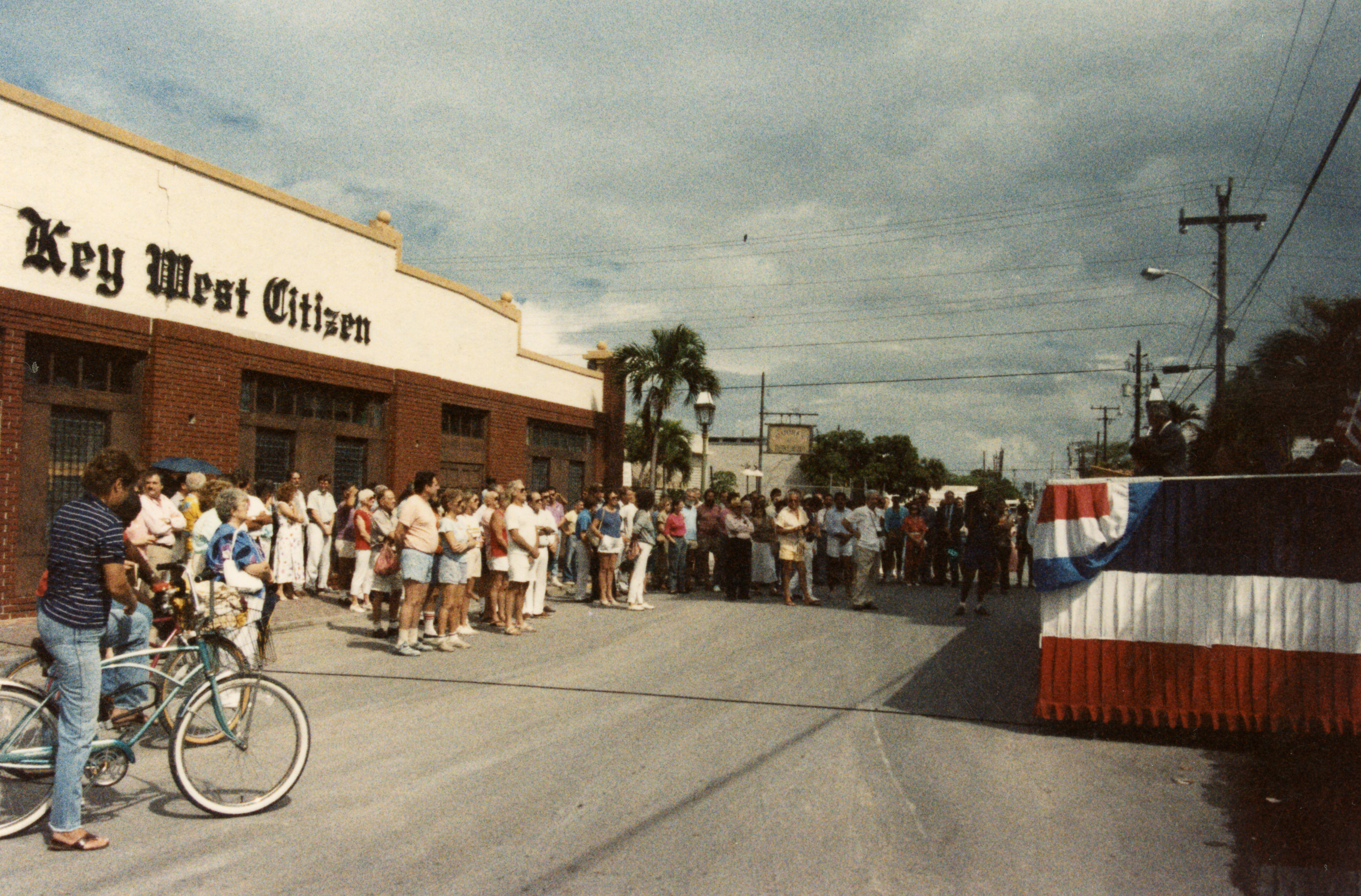
Old offices of the Key West Citizen on Greene Street in November 1987

In 1985, the paper became a morning edition, and by the summer of 1988, had moved to its present location at 3420 Northside Drive, the largest office it had ever occupied. In 1989, Thomson invested in a Goss Community press and a new computer system that brought The Citizen in line with the rest of the newspaper world.

The next few years were ones of heady expansion. Through the 1990s, Thomson acquired five small weeklies in Big Pine Key, Islamorada and Key Largo and rechristened them the Free Press Community Newspapers, part of the larger Thomson Florida Keys Media Group.

By the late 1990s, Thomson, in keeping with its growing emphasis on electronic publishing, snapped up Global Audience Providers, and created keysnews.com and floridakeys.com to serve the county's growing number of absentee readers and tourists. Both businesses were to be affiliated with the Key West Citizen and managed from Key West.

Late in 1998, Thomson bought the independent weekly Solares Hill, which was founded in 1976.

=== 2000s ===
But by February 2000, Thomson announced plans to divest itself of 54 small papers in the United States and Canada, in order to focus more intently on its databases and other cyberspace holdings.

On June 21, the Key West Citizen was sold to John Kent Cooke Sr., scion of a family with strong roots in newspaper publishing: family patriarch Jack Kent Cooke, who had been involved in a number of joint newspaper ventures with Thomson in Canada, once owned the Los Angeles Daily News, as well as a group of community papers in Arizona, Colorado and New Mexico.

Locally owned again - for the first time since 1968 - The Citizen, managed by John Kent Cooke Jr., and his brother Tom Cooke at floridakeys.com, continues to provide a forum for debate within an often fractious community, and high-quality printed and electronic news products that can be accessed from around the world.

The Citizen added a Saturday edition in 2003 to publish seven days a week. It updated and redesigned its Web site, keysnews.com, in 2008. It remains the only daily newspaper published in the Florida Keys.

In 2018, Adams Publishing Group acquired Cooke Communications.
