= Kent County News =

Weekly newspaper in Chestertown, Maryland, US

- Type: Weekly newspaper
- Format: Tall Tabloid
- Owner: Adams MultiMedia
- Publisher: Jim Normandin
- Founded: 1793; 225 years ago (as The Chestertown Spy)
- Headquarters: 223 High Street Chestertown, MD, 21620, US
- Circulation: 2,980 (as of 2021)
- Website: www.myeasternshoremd.com/kent_county_news/

Kent County News is a weekly newspaper published in Chestertown, Maryland. The paper is published once a week on Thursday. The first publication was in 1947, but the paper can be traced back to the Chestertown Spy which was established in 1793. It is one of the nation's oldest newspapers. The paper serves Kent County and the city of Chestertown on the Eastern Shore of Maryland.

The newspaper was previously part of Chesapeake Publishing, a division of American Consolidated Media. In March 2014, the division was sold to Adams Publishing Group. This paper is a part of APG Media of Chesapeake. Kent County News is one of 34 publications across Maryland and Delaware published by APG Media of Chesapeake.

The newspaper is published at 223 High Street Chestertown, Maryland, 21620.

== History ==
Kent County News has been serving Kent County since 1793. Kent County News officially began its publication in 1947, but was originally known as the Chestertown Spy which began in 1793. The original Chestertown Spy was locally owned and reported on the daily activity in and around Chestertown. The Chestertown Spy was rebooted in 2009, but does not consider itself a newspaper.

In 2007, Kent County News was owned and published by Chesapeake Publishing, a section of American Consolidated Media. The paper remained under ACM until March 2014 when it was sold to Adams Publishing Group. At the time of the sale, David Fike, the president and publisher of the Chesapeake group, said that he was "thrilled ... to be moving back to a family owned company" with "diversified resources and opportunities".

APG consists of four regions; Kent County News is a part of APG Media of Chesapeake. The Chesapeake Publishing Group publishes six newspapers and five free distribution products. It is located in Easton, Maryland, and the publishing corporation employs about 580 people.

== Coverage ==
The paper is published weekly, and there are daily online updates. It is published every Thursday, except holidays.

Kent County News covers the local news in Chestertown and surrounding areas. The paper reports on sports, opinions, school news, obituaries, real estate, and community arts and celebrations.

== Awards and recognition ==
In April 2009, staff photographer Charlie Campbell won first-place for a photo from the scene of a tractor-trailer crash from the Maryland-Delaware-D.C. Press Association (MDDC Press Association) in the category of spot news photo . That same year, editor Kevin Hemstock won first place in the editorial category, for a piece called "Gansler's Bay Audit Got Off to a Bad Start". Staff writer Peter Heck also took a first place award that year in the environment category for his report titled "Biodiesel Plant is Proposed for Kent".

Trish McGee, deputy and sports editor of the Kent County News, was named the best of all columnists in Maryland, Delaware, and Washington, D.C. in May 2013. She received the best in show ”honor by MDDC Press Association for her article "Honoring an Orioles Legend" on Brooks Robinson.

In 2017, the entire editorial staff of the paper was honored by the MDDC Press Association for excellence in journalism and their news reporting in 2016. Editor Daniel Divilio received first place for education reporting in the circulation category for his article "School Funding Woes: How We Got to This Point. Trish McGee won first place for the feature story (non-profile) category for her piece "Kent County Salutes its Vietnam Veterans". McGee also won first for "10 Years Later, Cataldo Has a Geart of a Champion", a sports feature story.

In 2018, the full editorial staff received honors again from the MDDC Press Association for their reporting in 2017. Editor Divilio received first place for education reporting in the circulation division for his article titled "Angry Parents Voice Issues with School Buses". McGee and Schenke received second place awards for articles.
