= Marlboro Colored High School =

- Valley Lane-area, Upper Marlboro, Prince George's County, Maryland, U.S.

Information
- Other name: Upper Marlboro Colored High School
- Established: 1923
- Closed: 1935

Marlboro Colored High School, also known as Upper Marlboro Colored High School, was a segregated public high school for African American students from 1923 until 1935 in Prince George's County, Maryland. It was succeeded by Frederick Douglass High School, which opened in 1935 on a new campus.

== History ==
The Free Colored School Society of Upper Marlboro was formed between 1865 and 1867 by three formerly enslaved men; brothers Henson Greenleaf and Nicholas Greenleaf, and George Boulding. The Free Colored School Society was affiliated with the Methodist church and advocated within the community for a school for African-American students.

Marlboro Colored High School opened in September 1923. It was the first high school for African-Americans in Prince George's County, and was funded by a fundraising effort by Prince George's County Supervisor of Colored Schools, Doswell E. Brooks, which began in 1922. The land for this school was donated by Sheldon Sasscer and was in the Valley Lane area. During the era of legal racial segregation in schools, White students in the Upper Marlboro area attended Marlboro High School, which opened two years earlier in 1921. The former high school building for the White students, a four-room building, was moved onto Sasscer's land so it could be used as the new school for Black students.

Prior to the establishment of Marlboro, Black students in Prince George's County attended high school in either Baltimore or Washington, DC. After it opened African-American students from half the county were bused to this school. In November 1929, families from the area near Young's Corner market (20 miles away) requested an expansion of the county bus lines, in order to also attend Marlboro Colored High School, however that was rejected in March 1930 based on the estimated cost to tax payers and the size of the school. The policy around busing prompted a request for funding a larger high school and elementary school, due to the high attendance.

After Black students moved to Frederick Douglass High School, in the early 1960s, the building was used as the Annex to the nearby Frederick Sasscer High School for a short period.
