= Livingston Enterprise =

Daily newspaper published in Livingston, Montana

- Type: Daily newspaper
- Owner: Adams MultiMedia
- Founder(s): George H. Wright; Joseph E. Hendry
- Publisher: Mark Dobie
- Managing editor: John Carroll
- Founded: 1883
- Language: English
- Headquarters: 201 E Clark St, Livingston, MT 59047
- Website: livingstonenterprise.com

The Livingston Enterprise is a daily newspaper published in Livingston, Montana. It was founded in 1883 and is owned by Adams MultiMedia.

== History ==
On June 6, 1883, George H. Wright and Joseph E. Hendry published the first edition of the Livingston Enterprise in Livingston, Montana. Wright operated the paper for 16 years until selling it to B.F. Hoover, of Cleveland, Ohio in April 1899. Four months later Hoover died after accidentally shooting himself while cleaning his gun. His estate sold the Enterprise to A. Livingston for $5,000. The paper then became affiliated with the Silver Republican Party.

Businessman Marcus Daly controlled the paper until his death in 1900. At that time it was put up for sale. Frank Wright, brother of the paper's co-founder and business manager since the death of Hoover, bought the paper in June 1901. Wright sold the paper to Jerome G. Locke in May 1914. Locke previously acquired the Daily Post and merged the two papers together. Locke sold the Enterprise to James F. O'Connor and T.M. Swindlehurst in September 1917.

O'Connor and his associates sold a controlling interest in the Livingston Publishing Company to Robert S. Phillips, J. Thomas Melton and Copeland C. Burg in July 1919. Philips sold his interests to George L. Seese in December 1922. Seese became editor and Melton became general manager. Leclair E. Flint succeeded Seese as editor in May 1923, and succeeded Melton as general manager in May 1925. Flint retired from the paper in 1940. The new editor was R.E. Miller.

The Anaconda Company acquired the Enterprise as some point and operated it under its holding company called the Fairmont Corporation. Anaconda Co. sold its eight Montana newspapers, including the Enterprise, to Lee Enterprises in June 1959. At that time the paper's circulation was 2,751. Lee sold the Enterprise and the weekly Park County News to Star Printing Co. of Miles City in March 1970. The company operated its papers under the subsidiary Yellowstone Newspapers In October 2022, Adams Publishing Group acquired Yellowstone Newspapers, which published the Enterprise.
