= Mesabi Tribune =

Newspaper in Virginia, Minnesota

Coordinates: 47.517732°N 92.541774°W

- Type: Daily newspaper
- Format: Print, Digital
- Owner: Adams MultiMedia
- Publisher: Chris Knight
- Editor: Jerry Burnes
- Founded: 1893
- Ceased publication: 2020
- Headquarters: 704 7th Avenue; Virginia, MN 55792
- Circulation: 7,582 (as of 2024)
- ISSN: 1930-9465
- OCLC number: 1607656
- Website: mesabitribune.com

The Mesabi Tribune is a daily newspaper published in Virginia, Minnesota. It is one of the oldest surviving businesses in the city.

== History ==
The newspaper was founded in 1893 as the Virginia Enterprise and switched names to Mesabi Daily News in 1945. The very first editor of the paper was named R. McGarry, who was succeeded by D. A. Cuppernoll in 1895.

In 2014, Adams Publishing group acquired 34 papers, including the Daily News, from American Consolidated Media.

In 2020, the newspaper was combined with the Hibbing Daily Tribune to create the Mesabi Tribune.
