= Beloit Daily News =

Newspaper in Beloit, Wisconsin

The Beloit Daily News
- Type: Daily newspaper
- Format: Broadsheet
- Owner: Adams MultiMedia
- Publisher: Kim Boreen
- Editor: Clint Wolf
- Staff writers: 5
- Founded: 1848
- Headquarters: 690 3rd St, Suite 120; Beloit, Wisconsin 53511
- Circulation: 3,047 (as of 2022)
- Website: beloitdailynews.com

The Beloit Daily News is a daily newspaper that has served Beloit, Wisconsin and the stateline area of Rock County, Wisconsin and Winnebago County, Illinois since 1848. The newspaper was owned by Duane Hagadone and the Hagadone Newspaper Group until June 2019, when it was sold to Adams Publishing Group.

== History ==
The Daily News grew out of a series of weekly and daily newspapers founded in the 1840s and 1850s. The Beloit Journal was first published in June 1848 as a weekly. It merged with another paper, the Beloit Courier in the early 1860s (which itself was formed from the merger of the Beloit Herald and the Beloit Times). After being published as the Beloit Journal and Courier, it changed its name back to the Beloit Journal in 1864. In 1870, the Beloit Journal was bought by the publisher of the Beloit Free Press, which started publishing in 1866; the merged paper was soon called the Beloit Free Press.

In 1879, a weekly newspaper called The Outlook was published. After becoming a daily in 1886, it was called the Beloit Daily Citizen and then the Beloit Daily News. Beloit was then home for the next several decades to two competing newspapers: the Republican Beloit Free Press and the Democratic (later independent) Beloit Daily News. The Daily News eventually bought out the Free Press in 1915, and continued to publish to the present day.

The Beloit Daily News launched its website, the BDN Connection, in June 1995. It was the first daily newspaper web site in Wisconsin to have live local news updated daily.

== Published works ==
- "Beloit in the Field!", Beloit Journal and Courier, April 18, 1861
