= Martin County Enterprise & Weekly Herald =

Newspaper in North Carolina, USA

- Type: Newspaper
- Format: Broadsheet
- Owner: Adams MultiMedia
- Publisher: Kyle Stephens
- Editor: Thadd White
- Founded: 2012
- Circulation: 2,302 (as of 2019)
- Website: www.reflector.com/enterprise

The Martin County Enterprise & Weekly Herald is a semi-weekly paper published on Tuesdays and Fridays by Adams MultiMedia. Its coverage area is Martin County, North Carolina, United States, with offices located in Williamston. The publisher of the newspaper is Kyle Stephens.

The Martin County Enterprise & Weekly Herald was created by a merger of the Williamston Enterprise and the Robersonville Weekly Herald.
