= Herald-Citizen =

Daily American newspaper

- Type: Daily newspaper
- Format: Broadsheet
- Owner: Walls Newspapers
- Publisher: Jack McNeely
- Editor: Jack McNeely
- Founded: 1903
- Headquarters: 1300 Neal St. P.O. Box 2729; Cookeville, TN 38502
- Price: $1.50
- ISSN: 8750-5541
- OCLC number: 11501842
- Website: herald-citizen.com

The Herald-Citizen is a daily newspaper in Cookeville, Tennessee, United States. It has been published since 1903.

== See also ==
- List of newspapers in Tennessee
