= Rock Springs Rocket-Miner =

Daily newspaper published in Rock Springs, Wyoming

- Type: Daily newspaper
- Owner: Adams MultiMedia
- Founder: Robert Smith
- Founded: 1881 (as the Sweetwater Gazette)
- Language: English
- Headquarters: 215 D Street in Rock Springs, Wyoming
- Circulation: 2,734 (as of 2020)
- OCLC number: 46896339
- Website: wyomingnews.com/rocketminer

The Rock Springs Rocket-Miner is the daily newspaper of Rock Springs and Sweetwater County in southwestern Wyoming.

== History ==
In February 1881, the Sweetwater Gazette was first published in Green River, Wyoming. The newspaper was founded by Robert Smith, a former Scotland soccer international player. In 1887, he relocated the newspaper to Rock Springs, renaming it the Rock Springs Miner. In 1902, Smith sold the paper. A few years later, Frank B. Crumley took over the Miner.

In 1907, C. Lou Wanamaker founded the Rock Springs Rocket. He died in 1908. His widow Mrs. Cora B. Wanamaker published the Rocket until her death in 1920. It was soon acquired by attorney Douglas A. Preston who in 1922 sold the Rocket to Lester G. Baker, owner of the Kemmerer Republican, which later was renamed to the Kemmerer Gazette. Baker went on to serve as Kemmerer mayor. In 1928, he sold the Rocket to Robert Wilson. It was then acquired by Fred W. Speers in September 1931, followed by Tracy S. McCraken in December 1931. McCraken owned the Wyoming Eagle.

In 1937, David G. Richardson was hired as Rocket publisher. In 1939, Mr. Crumley died. His widow Gertrude Crumley then assumed full control of the Miner. It was soon acquired by Paul Sedinack, who in 1941 sold the Miner to McCraken. The two papers were then merged to form the Rock Springs Daily Rocket-Miner. In 1949, the paper dedicated a new printing plant. D.G. Richardson published the paper for 37 years until his death in 1974. He was succeeded as publisher by his son, Charles E. Richardson.

In October 2015, McCraken Newspaper Group was acquired by Adams Publishing Group. The sale included the Rocker-Miner, Wyoming Tribune Eagle, Laramie Boomerang and Rawlins Daily Times. In June 2019 the paper cut back its print schedule to two days a week and switched from carrier to postal delivery.
