= Faribault Daily News =

Daily American newspaper

Coordinates: 44.296655°N 93.268795°W

- Type: Daily newspaper
- Format: Broadsheet
- Owner: Adams Publishing Group
- Publisher: Kevin True
- Editor: Jeff Forward
- Founded: November 1948
- Headquarters: 514 Central Avenue; Faribault, MN 55021
- City: Faribault
- Country: United States
- Circulation: 2,542 (as of 2024)
- ISSN: 0889-8898
- OCLC number: 9887364
- Website: www.southernminn.com/faribault_daily_news/

The Faribault Daily News is a local newspaper in Faribault, Minnesota, area. It is published six days a week since 1948 and is a wholly owned subsidiary of Adams Publishing Group. Chad Hjellming is the Publisher and Regional General Manager of this daily. Its website has averaged over 250,000 hits per month in 2018.

== Coverage ==
Aside from its daily local content, which finds its strength in general news reporting and in-depth profile features, the Faribault Daily News contains many additional local publications such as a lifestyle magazine titled "Southern Minn Girlfriends." This is a magazine which is published every other month and claims on their homepage to "connect local women in a genuine way."

== Ownership ==
Faribault Daily News is owned by Adams Publishing Group, based out of Northern Minnesota.

== Awards ==
In 2013, the sports journalists of the Faribault Daily News won three awards in the Minnesota AP Sports Awards competition. The award was announced on July 14, 2014.
