= Carroll News =

Weekly newspaper in Hillsville, Virginia, U.S.

The Carroll News
- "Dedicated to serving the people of Carroll County."
- Type: Weekly newspaper
- Format: Broadsheet
- Owner: Adams MultiMedia
- Editor: Allen Worrell
- Founded: 1920; 106 years ago
- Language: English
- Headquarters: Hillsville, Virginia
- OCLC number: 926116027
- Website: thecarrollnews.com

The Carroll News is a weekly newspaper based in Hillsville, Virginia, and owned by Adams MultiMedia. It covers Carroll County, Virginia.

== History ==
The News was previously owned by Heartland Publications. In 2012 Versa Capital Management merged Heartland Publications, Ohio Community Media, the former Freedom papers it had acquired, and Impressions Media into a new company, Civitas Media. Civitas Media sold the News and its properties in the Carolinas to Champion Media in 2017. Later in 2017, Champion Media sold the News to Adams Publishing Group.
