= Crossville Chronicle =

Newspaper in Crossville, Tennessee, United States

- Front page of the Crossville Chronicle on October 9, 2018
- Type: Twice-weekly newspaper
- Publisher: Bill Atkinson
- Editor: Cheryl Duncan
- Associate editor: Gary Nelson, Michael R. Moser, Jessica Ceballos
- Advertising: Kristin Bowman
- Founded: 1886
- Headquarters: 125 West Avenue; Crossville, Tennessee, United States
- Sister newspapers: Glade Sun
- Website: crossville-chronicle.com

The Crossville Chronicle is a newspaper in Crossville, Tennessee that provides news coverage of Cumberland County and surrounding areas. It was founded in 1886, and publishes on Tuesdays and Fridays.

== See also ==
- List of newspapers in Tennessee
