= The Blowing Rocket =

- Type: Weekly newspaper
- Format: Tabloid
- Owner: Adams MultiMedia
- Founded: June 1932
- Language: English
- Headquarters: 452-1 Sunset Drive; Blowing Rock, North Carolina
- Circulation: 407 (as of 2021)
- OCLC number: 23858420
- Website: blowingrocket.com

The Blowing Rocket is a weekly newspaper in Blowing Rock, North Carolina, United States.

== History ==
The newspaper was created as a tabloid by future State Senator Columbus Vance Henkel, Jr., who served as publisher and business manager in June 1932 with the support of an editor and society editor. During the 1930s and 1940s it was a seasonal newspaper, published only during the months of June, July and August. The newspaper was a source of information for social events for both the local population and the wealthy tourists that visited in the summer. Each summer a student at the University of North Carolina at Chapel Hill School of Journalism was hired to edit the Rocket.

Alexander Reed Sarrett, Jr. was editor and publisher in 1937.

In the 1950s the Rocket switched to broadsheet format and a year-round publication schedule. In 1956 the Rocket was acquired by Rivers Printing Company, which owned the Watauga Democrat in Boone.

The Blowing Rocket published some early writings by Christian fiction writer Jan Karon in the 1980s.

In 2002, the Rocket became part of Jones Media's High Country Media group, which includes the Watauga Democrat, The Avery Journal and the Mountain Times. Adams Publishing Group purchased Jones Media, Inc. in 2016.

The Blowing Rocket has the distinction of being the last newspaper affiliated with the National Press Association to charge 10 cents for an individual copy. The Epitaph in Tombstone, Arizona raised its price from 10 cents to 25 cents in 1982, shortly before the Rocket took the same step.

In 2002, the Rocket had a paid circulation of 3,530. In 2016 there were 2,700 paid subscribers. As of December 1, 2019, the newspaper had a circulation of 591.

== See also ==
- List of newspapers published in North Carolina
