= Newark Post =

- Inform. Innovate. Inspire
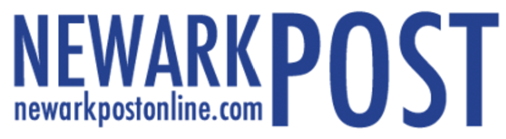

- March 21, 2025 front page
- Type: Weekly newspaper
- Owner: Adams MultiMedia
- Founder: Everett C. Johnson
- Editor: Josh Shannon
- Founded: 1910
- Headquarters: 601 North Bridge Street, Elkton, MD
- Circulation: 3,493 (as of 2021)
- ISSN: 2574-5573
- OCLC number: 17489956
- Website: newarkpostonline.com

The Newark Post is a local newspaper for the city of Newark, Delaware. It features local news, crime reports, and a section on events at local schools and at the University of Delaware.

== History ==
The Newark Post was founded in 1910, by Everett C. Johnson who later went on to become Secretary of State of Delaware. The first issue came out on January 26. The motto of the paper in those early days was, "Good Roads, Flowers, Parks, Better Schools, Trees, Pure Water, Fresh Air and Sunshine for Somebody and Work for Somebody."

In the early 1960s another paper, The Newark Weekly, was founded by Reginald B. "Rocky" Rockwell and Henry Galperin—and a newspaper battle began in this small college town which ended with The Newark Weekly purchasing the Newark Post—and renaming the publication the Weekly Post. The paper ran in this format for a number of years—even going daily as The Daily Post—for less than a full year beginning in 1972—and returning to its weekly publication. In the early 1980s the Weekly Post ceased publication for a couple of years, but was revived by its owners in its original name as the Newark Post.
