= Laramie Boomerang =

Newspaper published in Laramie, Wyoming

- Type: Daily newspaper
- Owner: Adams MultiMedia
- Founder: Edgar Wilson Nye
- Founded: 1881; 145 years ago
- Language: English
- City: Laramie, Wyoming
- Country: United States
- Circulation: 3,997 (as of 2020)
- OCLC number: 244390855
- Website: wyomingnews.com/laramieboomerang

The Laramie Boomerang is a newspaper in Laramie, Wyoming, US.

== History ==
The newspaper was first published on March 14, 1881, by American humorist Edgar Wilson ("Bill") Nye, who named the paper after his mule, "Boomerang", named so, Nye had said, because he could trust the mule to return him home no matter how inebriated and disoriented Nye might've become. The Boomerang was founded while Nye was the postmaster of the city, then in the Wyoming Territory. It launched him to national fame, gaining the newspaper subscribers in every state and many foreign countries. Nye contributed several humorous articles to the Boomerang, and served as the paper's editor until 1883. He was succeeded by M.C. Barrow.

In 1888, Mr. McKee and William E. Chaplin acquired the paper, and in May 1890 sold it to Charles L. Rauner. Ivy Buck was another minority owner and with Rauner converted the paper from a Republican to a Democratic publication. That August, the firm McKee & Chaplin launched the Laramie Republican. W.H. Kent was editor. In 1920, Frank Sumner Burrage acquired the Republican from the company. In 1923, Burrage purchased the Boomerang and merged the two together to form the Laramie Republican-Boomerang.

Tracy S. McCraken acquired the Laramie Daily Bulletin in 1936, and the Republican-Boomerang in 1938. McCraken previously served as secretary, in 1923, to Wyoming's Democratic Governor William Bradford Ross, and, in 1924, to U.S. Senator John B. Kendrick. Eventually, McCraken established a "close friendship" with Wyoming's Governor Leslie Andrew Miller and Senator Joseph Christopher O'Mahoney, forming an alliance one reporter called a "political steamroller" that was nicknamed the "M-O-M."

In 1957, the Republican-Boomerang and Daily Bulletin were merged to form the Daily Boomerang. In October 2015, McCraken Newspaper Group was acquired by Adams Publishing Group. The sale included the Boomerang, Wyoming Tribune Eagle, Rawlins Daily Times and Rock Springs Daily Rocket-Miner. In 2020, the Boomerang discontinued its Tuesday edition.
