= Hibbing Daily Tribune =

Defunct Minnesota newspaper

Coordinates: 47.425613°N 92.941493°W

- Type: Daily newspaper (except Monday)
- Owner: Adams Publishing Group
- Founded: 1893
- Ceased publication: 2020
- Language: American English
- Headquarters: 2142 First Avenue; Hibbing, MN 55746-0038
- City: Hibbing
- Country: United States
- Circulation: 3,749 (as of 2019)
- ISSN: 1075-4040
- OCLC number: 1586989
- Website: hibbingmn.com

The Hibbing Daily Tribune was a newspaper published from 1893 to 2020 in Hibbing, Saint Louis County, Minnesota. It was owned by the Adams Publishing Group.

== History ==
The Hibbing Daily Tribune is a successor to the following newspapers:

- Hibbing Daily News (Hibbing, Saint Louis County, Minn.) 1922-1927
- The Hibbing tribune (Hibbing, Minn.) 1899-1910

In 2020, the newspaper was combined with the Mesabi Daily News to create the Mesabi Tribune.

== See also ==
- List of newspapers in Minnesota
