= Dakota County Tribune =

Newspaper in Apple Valley, Minnesota

Coordinates: 44.727034°N 93.206631°W

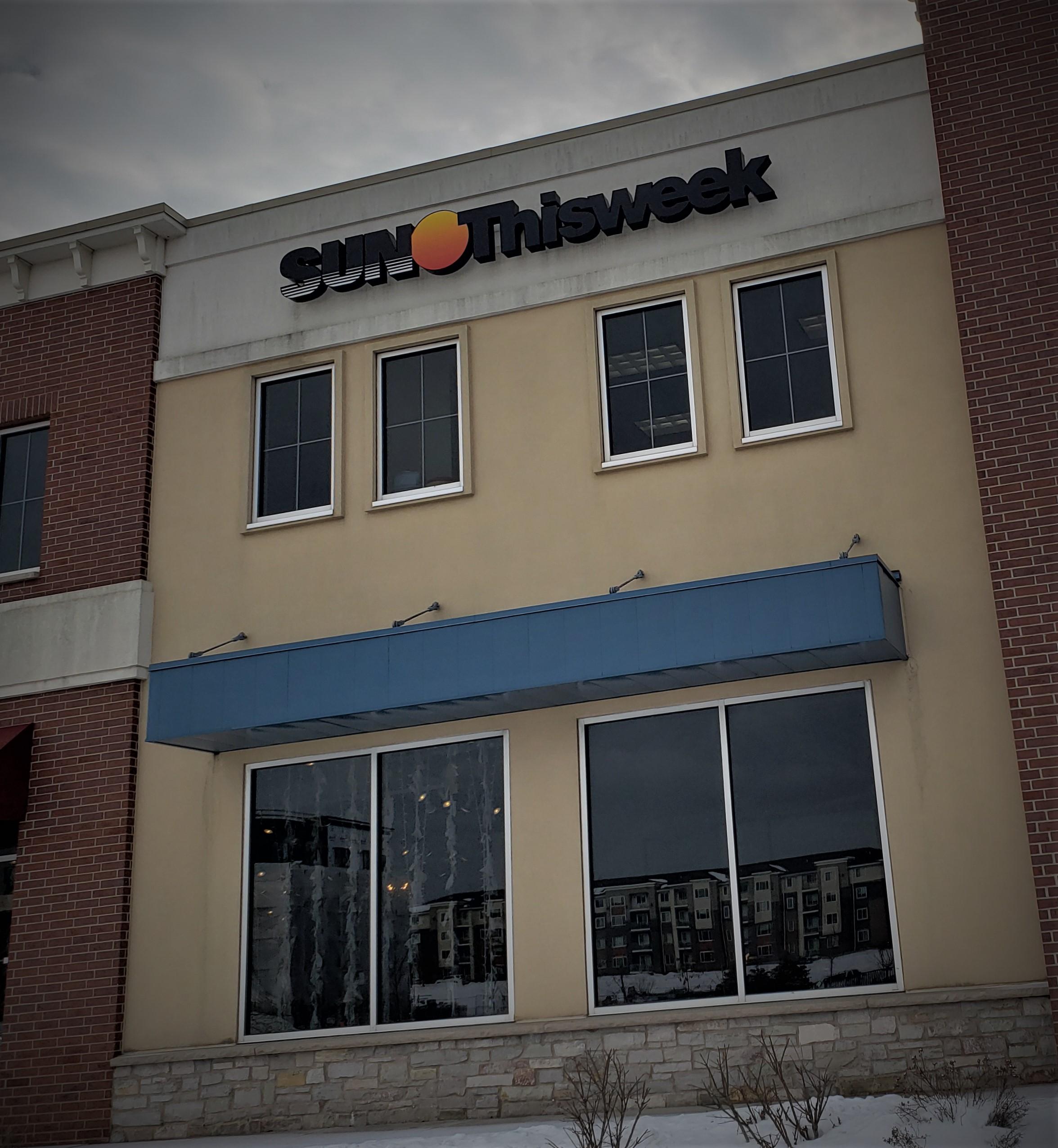
- Sun ThisWeek & Dakota County Tribune office in Apple Valley
- Type: Weekly newspaper (Friday)
- Owner: Adams Publishing Group-East Central Minnesota Media
- Publisher: East Central Minnesota
- Editor: Tad Johnson
- General manager: Mark Weber
- Founded: 1884
- Language: American English
- Headquarters: 15322 Galaxie Avenue, Suite 219; Apple Valley, MN 55124
- City: Apple Valley, Minnesota
- Country: United States
- Circulation: 8,298 (as of 2024)
- Readership: Apple Valley, Farmington, Rosemount
- Sister newspapers: Sun ThisWeek
- ISSN: 8750-2895
- OCLC number: 1565831
- Website: www.hometownsource.com/sun_thisweek/

The Dakota County Tribune is an American English-language weekly newspaper headquartered in Apple Valley, Minnesota, which serves the Apple Valley, Farmington and Rosemount communities in Dakota County. It was founded in 1884.

== History ==
The Dakota County Tribune was founded in Farmington on March 6, 1884, by Clarence P. Carpenter. It launched a free newspaper, ThisWeek, in 1979, which is now called Sun This Week. The headquarters was moved to Burnsville in 1984 and later to Apple Valley where it is now located. It launched its first website in 1997.

Previous names for the Dakota County Tribune include:

- Dakota County Tribune (Farmington, Minn.) (1884-1910)
- Dakota County tribune and Farmington herald (Farmington, Dakota County, Minn.) (1910-1912)
- The Lakeville Leader (Lakeville, Dakota County, Minn.) (1912-1930)
- Dakota County Tribune (1912–current)

The Dakota County Tribune is owned by Adams Publishing Group and is in the Central Division of the company.

== See also ==
- List of newspapers in Minnesota
