= Mountain Times (North Carolina newspaper) =

Newspaper in western North Carolina

- Type: Weekly newspaper
- Owner: Adams MultiMedia
- Publisher: Gene Fowler, Jr
- Editor: Tom Mayer
- Founded: 1978
- Language: English
- Headquarters: 474 Industrial Park Drive, Boone, North Carolina United States
- Circulation: 11,500 (as of 2021)
- Sister newspapers: Watauga Democrat, The Blowing Rocket, The Avery Journal-Times
- OCLC number: 33926172
- Website: Official website

The Mountain Times is a weekly newspaper that serves Boone and other high-country communities in Ashe and Avery counties in western North Carolina, United States.

== History ==
Founded in 1978, it serves a special niche in the region, covering community news and entertainment happenings. In 2002, it was purchased by a community-focused newspaper organization, Jones Media Inc., of Greeneville, Tennessee.

The Mountain Times is published every Thursday, with issues available at nearly 250 locations throughout the High Country.

In addition to the regular weekly edition, the Mountain Times also publishes three seasonal publications—Summer Times, Autumn Times and Winter Times, which serve as visitor guides to the High Country.

The Mountain Times was acquired by Adams Publishing Group in 2016.
