= Frederick Sasscer Jr. =

Attorney, journalist and educator (1856–1829)

- Born: March 4, 1856; Upper Marlboro, Maryland
- Died: November 1929
- Occupations: attorney, journalist, educator

Frederick Sasscer Jr. (March 4, 1856 – November 1929) was an attorney, a journalist and an educator from Upper Marlboro, Maryland. Sasscer's family has lived in Upper Marlboro since the 1760s. His parents were Dr. Frederick Sasscer and Rosalie Ghiselin.

Sasscer was educated at St. John's College in Annapolis. After his graduation, he was principal of the Marlboro Academy and went on to study law. He was admitted to the bar and in 1882 he began his career as a journalist, first as editor of the Prince George's Enquirer and Southern Maryland Advertiser and later as owner of The Enquirer-Gazette. In 1902, Sasscer returned to education as superintendent of the Prince George's County Public Schools, a post he held until 1914. Sasscer remained active as a journalist throughout this time, until his death in 1929.

== Personal life ==
In June 1893, Sasscer married Lucy Claggett, daughter of Robert and Emily Claggett. They had three children, Lucy, Robert and Harold.

== Legacy ==
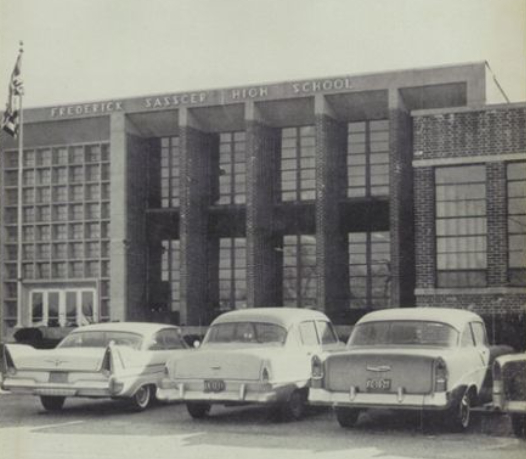

When the Old Marlboro High School (a/k/a Marlboro High School) outgrew its building in Upper Marlboro, Maryland, the county built a new facility at 14201 School Lane, Upper Marlboro, opening to students in 1948. The new school was known as Frederick Sasscer Jr./Sr. High School (a/k/a Frederick Sasscer High School) [see photo], honoring Frederick Sasscer, Jr. In 1970 the school was repurposed into a junior high school and, in 1978, it was again repurposed to house the board of education. Still reflecting the surname of Frederick Sasscer, Jr., the Sasscer Administration Building is the headquarters location of Prince George's County Public Schools.
