= Elizabeth City Daily Advance =

Newspaper in Elizabeth City, North Carolina

The Daily Advance
- front page
- Type: Daily newspaper
- Owner: Adams MultiMedia
- Publisher: Michael Goodman
- Editor: Julian Eure
- Founded: May 11, 1911; 115 years ago
- Language: American English
- Headquarters: 214 South Water Street; Elizabeth City, North Carolina 27909
- City: Elizabeth City
- Country: United States of America
- Circulation: 6,514 (as of 2019)
- OCLC number: 13380790
- Website: dailyadvance.com

The Daily Advance is an American, English-language daily newspaper based in Elizabeth City, North Carolina. The newspaper is owned by Adams Publishing Group.

Adams Publishing Group (APG) is a family-owned community newspaper company. It was launched in late 2013 by Mark Adams with support from his family. In 2009 Cooke Communications, a private company led by the son of Jack Kent Cooke, bought The Daily Advance from Cox Newspapers as part of a 13-paper sale, along with other North Carolina papers The Daily Reflector and Rocky Mount Telegram. The Daily Advance is now part of Adams Publishing Group.

== See also ==
- List of newspapers in North Carolina
