= Bertie Ledger-Advance =

- Type: Weekly newspaper
- Owner: Adams MultiMedia
- Publisher: Kyle Stephens
- Editor: Thadd White
- Staff writers: Deborah Griffin
- Founded: 1829 (as The Advance)
- Language: English
- Headquarters: 109 S King St Windsor, NC 27983
- Circulation: 1,472 (as of 2019)
- OCLC number: 13118314
- Website: dailyadvance.com/bertie

Bertie Ledger-Advance is an American newspaper based in Windsor, North Carolina covering Bertie County.

Cox Newspapers sold the paper to Cooke Communications North Carolina in 2009. It is published every week on Wednesday. The circulation in 2004 was 4,200. Preceding titles of this paper include The Advance and Bertie County Ledger, which were both published from 1929 to 1930.

== History ==
The Bertie Ledger-Advance was first published as the Windsor Herald and Bertie County Register in 1832. In 1928, the Bertie Ledger-Advance was established through The Aulander Advance and The Windsor Ledger.
