= Miles City Star =

Newspaper published in Miles City, Montana

- Type: Twice weekly newspaper
- Owner: Adams MultiMedia
- Founder: James G. Ramsey
- Editor: Hunter Herbaugh
- Founded: 1903
- Language: English
- Headquarters: 818 Main St, Miles City, MT 59301
- ISSN: 0891-8988
- OCLC number: 13080447
- Website: milescitystar.com

The Miles City Star is a twice weekly newspaper published in Miles City, Montana. It was founded in 1903 and is owned by Adams MultiMedia.

== History ==
In August 1903, James G. Ramsey published the first edition of the Miles City Independent in Miles City, Montana. In 1905, Ramsey sold the paper to Joe Smith, whose brother was a former governor.

In 1909, Joseph D. Scanlan, former editor of the Red Lodge Picket, bought the paper. The Independent published twice a week until Scanlan expanded it into a daily called The Daily Star. It was first published on May 24, 1911. Newspaper founder Ramsey died in 1920.

J.D. Scanlan was a prominent Republican leader in the state and was twice elected president of the Montana Press Association in 1911 and 1918. He died in 1939. His son Robert J. Scanlan inherited the paper. He was elected president of the state press association in 1954. R.J. Scanlan sold the The Star along with KATL (AM) to Robert W. Chandler, owner of Western Communications, in 1965. William H. Hornby, managing editor of The Denver Post, was associated with Chandler in the purchase and was named publisher of The Star.

Hornby co-founded Eastern Montana Publishing Co., which later became Yellowstone Newspapers. In 1979, he was elected president of the American Society of Newspaper Editors. In 2014, Hornby died. In 2022, Yellowstone Newspapers sold The Star and its other publications to Adams Publishing Group. A year later the paper decreased it's print schedule to two days a week on Wednesdays and Saturdays.
