= Wyoming Tribune Eagle =

Newspaper in Cheyenne, Wyoming

- The February 29, 2012 front page of the Wyoming Tribune Eagle
- Type: Daily newspaper
- Owner: Adams MultiMedia
- Founder: Nathan Addison Baker
- Publisher: Jeff Robertson
- Editor: Brian K. Martin
- News editor: Nicole Lebsack
- Photo editor: Blaine McCartney
- Founded: 1867 (as The Cheyenne Leader)
- Language: English
- Headquarters: 702 W Lincolnway; Cheyenne, Wyoming 82001; United States
- Circulation: 10,170 (as of 2020)
- Website: wyomingnews.com

The Wyoming Tribune Eagle is a daily newspaper published in Cheyenne and distributed primarily in Laramie County, Wyoming. It is the state's second largest newspaper in terms of circulation, behind the Casper Star Tribune. The Tribune Eagle is also one of several newspapers serving the Front Range Urban Corridor.

== History ==
On September 19, 1867, Nathan Addison Baker published the first edition of The Cheyenne Leader. On November 20, 1869, S. Allen Bristol published the first edition of The Wyoming Tribune. In January 1872, Col. Edward Archibald Slack founded the Laramie Daily Independent. The name was changed to the Laramie Daily Sun three years later. In February 1876, Slack bought The Cheyenne Daily News from H.C. Keller and merged it with his paper to form the Cheyenne Sun.

In February 1890, John K. Shingle sold the Tribune to George R. Caldwell, who bought out his partner A.L. White a few months later. In June 1895, the Cheyenne Daily Leader ceased. Slack purchased the defunct plant and relaunched his paper as the Cheyenne Sun-Leader. In 1900, word "Sun" was dropped from the name. In June 1901, William C. Deming, editor of Warren Tribune, bought the Cheyenne Daily Tribune. The paper was later renamed to the Wyoming State Tribune.

In March 1907, Slack died. In June 1908, William G. Edmiston bought the Leader. In September 1911, Edmiston sold the Leader to a syndicate led by Senator James R. Carpenter, associated with Senator John B. Kendrick. In July 1920, Deming bought the Leader from Kendrick. In March 1921, the Tribune and Leader merged to form the Tribune-Leader.

In 1925, the Wyoming Eagle, a weekly Democratic paper in Cheyenne, was established by Theodore Wanerus, Howard P. McPherson, and R.F. McPherson. In October 1926, Tracy S. McCraken, secretary of Senator John B. Kendrick, assumed editorship of the Eagle. In February 1937, Deming sold the Tribune-Leader to Alfred G. Hill, former publisher of the Fort Collins Express-Courier. In July 1937, the businesses that published Eagle and Tribune-Leader merged, but both papers continued to operate separately. At that time the Tribune-Leader was renamed to the Tribune.

In May 1938, Hill sold his interests to Merritt C. Speidel, president of Speidel Newspapers. In July 1949, McCraken bought out Speidel. In December 1960, T.S. McCraken died. He was succeeded by his son William D. "Bill McCraken. In January 1994, the Eagle and Tribune merged to form the Wyoming Tribune Eagle. In September 2002, Bill McCraken died. In October 2015, McCraken Newspaper Group was acquired by Adams Publishing Group. The sale included the Tribune Eagle, Laramie Boomerang, Rawlins Daily Times and Rock Springs Daily Rocket-Miner.
