= Rocky Mount Telegram =

- Type: Daily newspaper
- Owner: Adams MultiMedia
- Publisher: Kyle Stephens
- Editor: Gene Metrick
- Founded: 1995
- Language: American English
- Headquarters: 1000 Hunter Hill Road, Rocky Mount, North Carolina 27804
- Circulation: 6,519 (as of 2019)
- ISSN: 1082-3727
- OCLC number: 31876877
- Website: rockymounttelegram.com

The Rocky Mount Telegram is an American, English language daily newspaper based in Rocky Mount, North Carolina.

== History ==
In the summer of 1996, Thomson Newspapers traded the Telegram to Cox Newspapers in exchange for six newspapers in Arizona. The deal was completed on December 17 of that year.

Adams Publishing Group, a family-owned company led by CEO, Mark Adams, bought the Telegram in 2018 from Cooke Communications LLC. The assets included in the purchase included Cooke Communications's print publications, websites and commercial printing operations, located in North Carolina and Florida. Other North Carolina papers included in the sale were The Daily Reflector and Elizabeth City Daily Advance.

== See also ==
- List of newspapers in North Carolina
