= Watertown Daily Times (Wisconsin) =

Newspaper in Watertown, Wisconsin

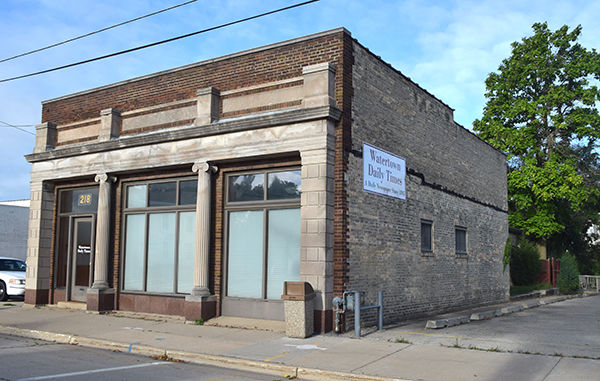
- Watertown Daily Times office at 218 S. 1st St.
- Type: Daily newspaper
- Format: Tall Tabloid
- Owner: Adams MultiMedia
- Editor: Zack Goodrow
- Founded: 1895
- Language: English
- Headquarters: 218 S. First St. Watertown, Wisconsin 53094; United States
- Circulation: 4,700 Daily (as of 2024)
- Website: wdtimes.com

The Watertown Daily Times is a daily newspaper publishing Monday through Friday in Watertown, Wisconsin. Along with the Daily Jefferson County Union, it is one of two major daily papers published in Jefferson County. The Watertown Daily Times also covers the southern portion of Dodge County, with the City of Watertown split between Dodge and Jefferson Counties.

The editorial operation of the Watertown Daily Times is located in downtown Watertown, though the paper's printing operations have been conducted at sister publication, The Gazette in Janesville, since the paper's relocation in 2019.

== History ==
The Daily Times was founded November 23, 1895, when John W. Cruger and E. J. Schoolcraft formed a partnership to publish a daily newspaper in Watertown. In 1908, the Daily Times absorbed the competing Watertown Daily Reader, which began publication in 1906.

In 1919, John Clifford secured a controlling interest in the newspaper.

The paper stayed in the Clifford family until 2018, when it was sold to Adams Publishing Group. It is a member of APG's Southern Wisconsin group.

The Daily Times was located at 115 W Main Street in Watertown from 1916 until 2019. which now includes a community park known as Bentzin Family Town Square. The paper has since moved across the Rock River to S. First Street.

== Notable people ==
While campaigning in Wisconsin in 1959, former president John F. Kennedy thanked Clifford for coverage in the Daily Times.

US Congressman Scott Fitzgerald is a former associate publisher of the Daily Times. He sold the Dodge County Independent News in Juneau, Wisconsin to the Daily Times in 1996, and remained affiliated for several years.

Former Daily Times managing editor Tom Schultz, who led the paper for over 40 years, was elected to the Wisconsin Newspaper Association Hall of Fame in 2017. As of 2024, Schultz contributes a weekly column to his former paper, titled "In Times Square." Schultz's column title references the previous location of the Daily Times office.

Schultz's successor, Scott Peterson, was also elected to the WNA Hall of Fame, earning the honor in 2026.

In January 2024, Tim Sullivan, an alumnus of mgoblog.com and the Rivals.com network was named the editor of the Watertown Daily Times. After Sullivan's promotion to Regional Editor for Adams MultiMedia of Southern Wisconsin, he named Zack Goodrow his successor.
