= The Star Democrat =

American newspaper published in Easton, Maryland, US

- Type: Daily newspaper
- Format: Tall Tabloid
- Owner: Adams MultiMedia
- Founder: Thomas Perrin Smith
- Publisher: Thomas Perrin Smith (1799–1841); George W. Sherwood (1841–43; T.K. Robson (1843–96); John Todd (1889–96); Easton Publishing Co. (1896–1961); Jim Normandin (Current)
- President: Jim Normandin
- Editor-in-chief: Jonathan Carter
- Founded: August 1799; 226 years ago
- Headquarters: 29088 Airpark Drive Easton, Maryland 21601 (Physical address); P.O. Box 600 Easton, Maryland 21601 (Mailing address)
- Country: United States
- Circulation: 7,836 (as of 2021)
- ISSN: 1065-2345
- OCLC number: 20400341
- Website: stardem.com

The Star Democrat is an American newspaper published and mainly distributed in Easton, Maryland, in Talbot County, as well as in the surrounding counties of Caroline, Dorchester, Queen Anne's and Kent. The Star Democrat is published on Wednesdays, Thursdays, Fridays and Sundays. The Tuesday edition is currently digital only.

== History ==
=== 1799–1977 ===
The Star Democrat was founded in 1799 by Thomas Perrin Smith as The Republican and then The Star. The newspaper competed against the Maryland Herald (1790–1799). Smith bought the property where The Republican would print in 1801 and would use as his office and residence. The newspaper was a supporter of Thomas Jefferson. 'The Star' became known as The Republican Star and Eastern Shore Political Luminary sometime between the beginning of the newspaper and 1802. The Star became known all over the state of Maryland when the War of 1812 broke out. The newspaper in defiance of the British claiming rights to seize American ships, "To the citizens: Your independence, the legacy of the heroes of '76, has been attacked by a band of sea robbers and pirates. You are now called upon to assemble around the standards of your country and adopt measures that will convince the cowardly assins that we are the descendants of those heroes who once drove from our country, that we are willing and ready to do it again or perish with our constitution." In 1814, the newspaper bought the Eastern Shore General Advertiser (1802–1814) and became known as The Republican Star and Eastern Shore General Advertiser. On September 20, 1814, the newspaper's name changed to The Republican Star. In 1841, 'The Star' bought Whig & Advocate (1828–1841).

In 1841, Smith retired and turned the newspaper over to George W. Sherwood. Sherwood bought the Eastern-Shore Star. In 1843, Sherwood turned the newspaper over to T.K. Robson. Robson bought The Easton Star. In 1889, John Todd had publishing duties. Sometime between 1889 and 1896 the newspaper bought the Easton Democrat. In 1896, The Republican Star and Eastern Shore Political Luminary merged with a rival newspaper, The Democrat, to become The Star-Democrat. Sometime between 1896 and In 1911, the Chesapeake Bay Yacht Club bought the original property that Smith had bought and used.

=== 1974–present ===
The Star Democrat expanded from a county weekly to a regional weekday paper in 1974 and added a Sunday edition, The Sunday Star, in October 1988. A website, www.stardem.com, was launched in 1996.

In the fall of 1978, the newspaper moved from downtown Easton to its current plant at 29088 Airpark Drive.

The paper is owned by Adams Publishing Group.
