= Watauga Democrat =

Newspaper in Boone, North Carolina, United States

- Front page on August 31, 2016
- Type: Weekly newspaper
- Owner: Adams MultiMedia
- Publisher: Gene Fowler
- Editor: Moss Brennan
- Founded: 1888
- Headquarters: Boone, North Carolina
- Circulation: 1,716 (as of 2021)
- Website: wataugademocrat.com

The Watauga Democrat is a weekly newspaper published in Boone, North Carolina. It was first published in 1888 to share news about the local Democratic Party; today, it chronicles general local news in Watauga County.

The Watauga Democrat was named a newspaper of general excellence by the North Carolina Press Association.

== History ==
The Watauga Democrat began as a political newspaper but quickly evolved into a highly respected non-partisan publication. In July 1888, Joseph Spainhour began printing a weekly newspaper he named the Watauga Democrat. The newspaper's stated mission was to be "the voice of the Watauga Democrat Party."

One year later, the Democrat was purchased by D.B. and D.D. Dougherty and R.C. Rivers. Rivers subsequently bought out the Doughertys and became sole owner. Early issues of the Democrat were printed on a hand-operated press capable of printing only one page at a time. Each edition had a maximum of four pages. A one-year subscription in 1888 was $1, and a one-inch classified ad could be bought for 75 cents.

In 1933, Rivers handed the role of publisher to his son, Robert Campbell Rivers Jr. The younger Rivers continued to operate the Democrat until his death in 1975. Rachel Rivers-Coffey took over as publisher of the Democrat following her father's death in 1975. She served as publisher for almost two decades, until the Democrat was bought by Eugene and Anne Worrell, who at that time also owned the Bristol Herald Courier in nearby Bristol, Virginia and The Daily Progress in Charlottesville, Virginia.

In 1997, the Worrells sold the Watauga Democrat to Arthur and Fran Powers. The Powers operated the Democrat until 2002, when it was acquired by Jones Media, owner of the rival free weekly Mountain Times. With that sale, Jones Media owned five community news papers in the High Country: Watauga Democrat, The Avery Journal-Times, Mountain Times, Ashe Mountain Times and The Blowing Rocket.

On Sept. 1, 2016, Jones Media's assets were sold to the family-owned Adams Publishing Group, based in Minneapolis, Minnesota, and chaired by Steve Adams. In 2017, Ashe Mountain Times changed its name to Ashe Post & Times when Adams Publishing Group acquired the Jefferson Post, combining the two Ashe County newspapers.

Adams Publishing Group owns and operates 100 community newspapers in 11 states, including the acquisition of five newspaper publishing companies in 2016, which included the Jones Media Group, parent company of The Blowing Rocket. APG company is based in Minneapolis, Minnesota. In addition to its community newspaper company, the Adams family owns radio stations, outdoor advertising companies, a wine distribution business, label printing companies and a large interest in Camping World Holdings, a publicly traded national network of RV dealers, affinity programs, the Good Sam Club and other RV-related products and services.

In 2024, the Watauga Democrat played a crucial role in providing essential information to the community during Hurricane Helene. The newspaper continued to report on the severe flooding and destruction in Watauga County, even as its staff faced power outages and communication disruptions. The editor-in-chief at the time, Moss Brennan, worked to deliver updates on rescue efforts and emergency services while also assisting in swift-water rescues.
