= Waseca County News =

- Type: Weekly newspaper
- Owner: Adams MultiMedia
- Publisher: Kevin True
- Editor: Jeff Forward
- Founded: May 1981
- Language: American English
- Headquarters: 213 Second St., NW; Waseca, MN 56093
- City: Waseca, Minnesota
- Country: United States
- Circulation: 1,289 (as of 2024)
- ISSN: 0745-8177
- OCLC number: 9485301
- Website: www.southernminn.com/waseca_county_news/

The Waseca County News is an American, English language newspaper in Waseca, Waseca County, Minnesota serving the areas of Waseca, Janesville, New Richland and Waldorf. The owner of the County News is the same owner of the local Sampler, which was previously called the Shopper.

== History ==
The Waseca County News began as the Waseca Weekly in May 1981 under the supervision of News Editor Lisa Vanderwerf and Sports Editor Jonathan Kronstadt. Its publisher, Michael Johnson, had previously been employed at the Waseca Daily Journal. In order to begin his work with the Weekly, Johnson first had to get a two-year non-compete clause that he had through the Journal waived; which he was able to do in January 1981 via a court order. The paper originally ran on Tuesdays at no cost to the citizens of Waseca.

Vanderwerf would leave the paper in July 1981, with Konstadt taking over News Editor duties; Konstadt having been replaced by Jim Lutgens as the Sports Editor. Konstadt left the paper in September 1981, and while the paper would operate without a news editor for nearly a year, they eventually promoted Staff Writer Jim Negen to News Editor in June 1982, after having worked at the paper for three months. It was during that year-long period that the Weekly would move to publishing twice a week, on Tuesdays and Thursdays.

In July 1982, the Waseca Weekly would change its name to the Waseca County News. The paper would continue the tradition of publishing on Tuesdays and Thursdays until early-2022 when they would move to publishing on Wednesdays.

== Editors ==
The editors of the Waseca County News include:

- Lisa Vanderwert (News Editor 1981)
- Jonathan Kronstadt (News Editor 1981)
- Jim Negen (News Editor 1982)
- Jeffery Jackson (Managing Editor 2020)
- Suzann Rook (Managing Editor Oct 2020 – August 2021)
- Lisa Kaczke (Associate Editor Oct 2020 – August 2021)
- Annie Harman (Associate Editor Sept 2021 – Oct 2022)
- Philip Weyhe (Managing Editor Sept 2021 – July 2025)

== Tink Larson Controversy ==
In 2006, the Waseca School Board removed Tink Larson from his position as baseball coach. The story made state headlines. Eden Prairie and Minneapolis newspapers covered the story as well. Reporters in the County News were also fired because they allegedly withheld information regarding the case. Their positions were then replaced within a few weeks. The sports writer was one of those fired. He started a new sports newspaper called Star Sports Extra: Your Sports Source. In the newspaper, he covers the surrounding communities' sports schedules. It debuted in October 2006, costing 50 cents per copy.
