= Athens News (Ohio) =

Local newspaper in Athens, Ohio

Coordinates: 39.329951°N 82.100842°W

The Athens NEWS
- Type: Weekly newspaper
- Format: Tabloid
- Owner: Adams Publishing Group
- Publisher: Paul Reynolds
- Editor: Nicole Bowman-Layton
- Founded: 1977
- Ceased publication: 2026
- Language: American English
- Headquarters: 9300 Johnson Rd., Athens, Ohio, 45701
- City: Athens
- Country: United States
- Circulation: 8,000 (as of 2024)
- ISSN: 0882-8695
- OCLC number: 12010891
- Website: athensnews.com

The Athens News (stylized as NEWS) was an American free weekly, English-language newspaper published in Athens, Ohio, and served the area that contains Ohio University. It was founded in 1977 and ceased in 2026.

== History ==
The newspaper was founded by Bruce Mitchell in 1977. It was initially published weekly under the name Athena "A" News but was published every Monday and Thursday since 1982 before becoming a weekly paper in 2019.

In the fall of 2014, the News was acquired by Adams Publishing Group, who had acquired the Messenger earlier that year.

In 2017, News celebrated its 40th anniversary and commemorated the occasion by publishing a book "40 Years on the Bricks: A History of The Athens NEWS."

In January 2026, the paper ceased its print edition and went online-only. That June, the paper ceased entirely and was fully absorbed into The Athens Messenger.

== Archive ==
Microfilmed issues of the Athens News issues from 1977 to 1990 and paper issues from 2000 to present are located at the Ohio University Alden Library Annex.

== History ==
- Athens "A" News ([Athens, Ohio]) 1977-1978, OCLC 20764098
- The Athens News (Athens, Ohio) 1979-current, OCLC 12010891
