= Dundalk Eagle =

Weekly newspaper in Dundalk, Maryland, United States

- Type: Weekly newspaper
- Owner: Adams MultiMedia
- Founder: Kimbel E. Oelke
- Editor: Connor Bolinder
- Founded: 1969
- Circulation: 4,204 (as of 2021)
- Website: dundalkeagle.com

The Dundalk Eagle is a newspaper serving Dundalk, Maryland. Founded in 1969 by Kimbel E. Oelke, it was one of the biggest family-owned weekly newspapers in Maryland before its acquisition by Adams Publishing Group in 2015.
