= Reed Sarratt =

American journalist (1917–1986)

- Sarratt in 1937
- Born: Alexander Reed Sarratt, Jr. September 17, 1917; Charlotte, North Carolina, U.S.
- Died: March 15, 1986 (aged 68)
- Education: University of North Carolina at Chapel Hill
- Occupation: Journalist
- Political party: Democratic Party
- Spouse: Elva Ann Ransom
- Children: 2 sons, 1 daughter
- Parent(s): Alexander R. Sarratt; Joncie Elizabeth Hutchinson

Reed Sarratt (1917–1986) was an American journalist and editor from North Carolina. He wrote about school desegregation in the Southern United States. He served as the executive director of the Southern Education Reporting Service from 1960 to 1965, and the Southern Newspaper Publishers Association from 1973 to 1986.

== Early life ==
Alexander Reed Sarratt Jr. was born on September 17, 1917, in Charlotte, North Carolina. His father was Alexander R. Sarratt and his mother, Joncie Elizabeth Hutchinson.

He graduated from the University of North Carolina at Chapel Hill in 1937, where he received a bachelor's degree in economics. While he was at UNC, he was also the managing editor of The Daily Tar Heel, the campus newspaper, in 1936–1937. He was also a member of Phi Beta Kappa society.

== Career ==
Sarratt started his career as a journalist for The Blowing Rocket. Shortly after, he became a reporter for The Charlotte News. He was an editorial writer for the Baltimore Evening Sun from 1946 to 1952. From 1952 to 1960, he was an editor for the Winston-Salem Journal and the Twin City Sentinel.

Sarratt served as the executive director of the Ford Foundation-funded Southern Education Reporting Service in Nashville, Tennessee from 1960 to 1965, where he tracked school desegregation in the South. He then worked for the Southern Regional Education Board in Atlanta, Georgia, from 1965 to 1968. Meanwhile, he wrote a book about segregation in 1966. He also edited a book about computers and another one on journalistic education.

Sarratt served as the Head of the Southern Newspaper Publishers' Association Foundation from 1969 to 1973, and as the executive director of the Southern Newspaper Publishers Association from 1973 to 1986.

Sarratt was inducted into the North Carolina Journalism Hall of Fame in 1985.

== Personal life ==
He married Elva Ann Ranson. They had two sons, Alexander Reed III, John Lester, and a daughter, Ann Ranson He was a member of the Democratic Party and the Presbyterian Church.

== Death and legacy ==
Sarratt died on March 15, 1986. The Reed Sarratt Lecture Series at the UNC School of Media and Journalism is named in his honor. His papers are preserved at the Louis Round Wilson Library on the UNC campus.

== Works ==
- The Ordeal of Desegregation: The First Decade (1966).
- The Impact of the Computer on Society (editor, 1966).
- Education for Newspaper Work (editor, 1973).
