= The Daily Reflector =

Newspaper located in Greenville, North Carolina

Coordinates: 35.660490°N 77.341561°W

- The 2009-07-08 front page of The Daily Reflector
- Type: Daily newspaper
- Format: Broadsheet
- Owner: Adams MultiMedia
- Editor: Bobby Burns
- Founded: January 10, 1882
- Headquarters: 1150 Sugg Parkway; Greenville, North Carolina
- City: Greenville
- Country: United States
- Circulation: 12,184 (as of 2019)
- ISSN: 1060-6130
- OCLC number: 13338961
- Website: reflector.com

The Daily Reflector is a daily newspaper that serves Pitt County and eastern North Carolina. It is headquartered in Greenville, North Carolina.

== History ==
The paper was originally titled "The Eastern Reflector", and was founded in 1882 by David Jordan and Julian Whichard. They founded the paper in a part of their mothers' school house with equipment they bought from another paper they had worked for, The Greenville Express. It became known and published daily as The Reflector on Dec. 10, 1894. The Daily Reflector was purchased by Cox Newspapers in 1996.

Her and mixer are free monthly magazines produced by The Daily Reflector. Her—as the name implies—is a magazine for women. mixer—written with a lowercase "m"—18- to 35-year-old population (which includes the large student bodies of East Carolina University and Pitt Community College) with local music, night spots and events for the same area.

Cox Newspapers began struggling financially in 2008 and put several of its properties up for sale, including The Daily Reflector. In addition to the paper being offered for sale, long-time publisher Jordan ("Jordy") Whichard III announced his resignation on January 5, 2009.

In 2009, Cox sold its 13 North Carolina newspapers, including the Rocky Mount Telegram, Elizabeth City Daily Advance and the Reflector, to Cooke Communications, a privately held family company headed by John Kent Cooke, son of Jack Kent Cooke. John Kent Cooke moved to the Greenville area to become president of Cooke Communications North Carolina and publisher of the Reflector. In September 2018, Adams Publishing Group, based in Greeneville, Tennessee, announced it had purchased the assets of Cooke Communications LLC, including the Reflector, the Rocky Mount Telegram and the Elizabeth City Daily Advance.

In August 2026, the paper announced plans to decrease its print schedule from five to two days a week.

== See also ==
- List of newspapers in North Carolina
