= Nashville Ledger =

Weekly newspaper

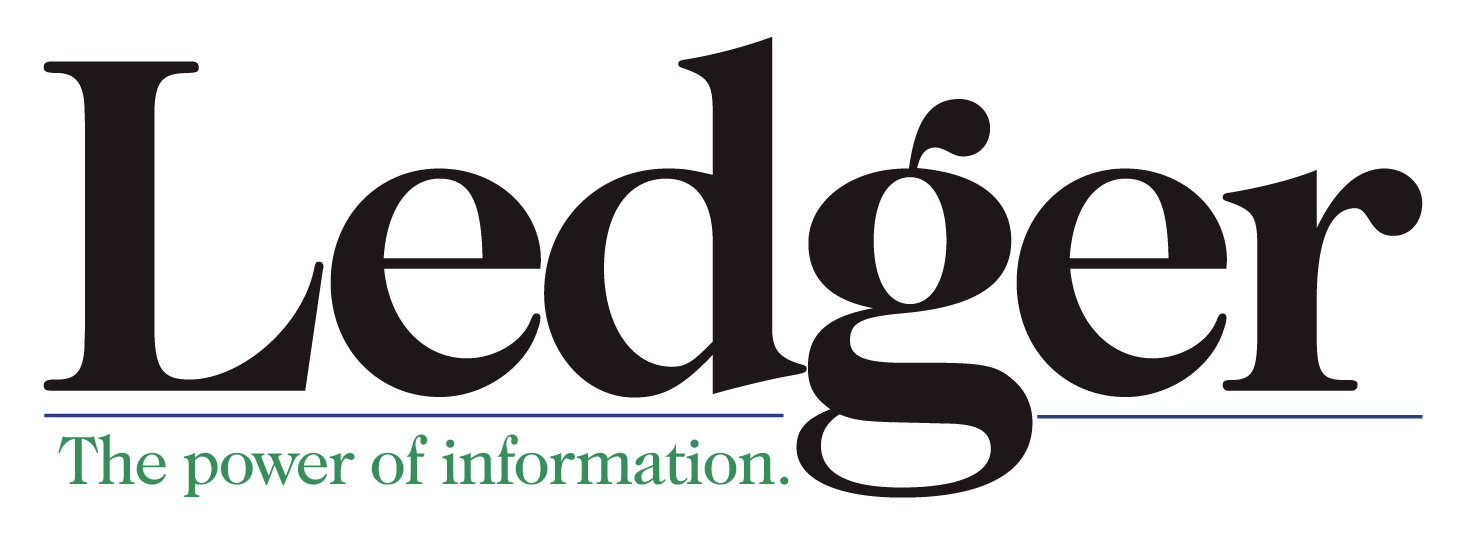
- Type: Weekly newspaper
- Owner: Daily News Publishing Company
- Founder: Doug Underwood
- Publisher: Daily News Publishing Company
- Editor: Lyle Graves
- Founded: 1978
- Headquarters: 222 2nd Ave N, Suite 101
- City: Nashville, Tennessee
- Country: US
- Circulation: 11,000
- ISSN: 0192-690X
- OCLC number: 5085947
- Website: tnledger.com

The Nashville Ledger is an American weekly newspaper for Nashville, Tennessee and surrounding areas. Its circulation is estimated at 11,000. The paper is owned by Daily News Publishing Co. The Nashville Ledger is qualified to run public notices in the following counties in Tennessee: Davidson, Williamson, Sumner, Wilson, Rutherford, Robertson, Montgomery, Maury, Dickson & Cheatham. The Ledger covers business, real estate, law and government.

== History ==
The Nashville Ledger was founded by Doug Underwood in 1978 as The Westview. Underwood started his career in journalism with the Nashville Banner in 1949. After working as a news and television journalist, Underwood decided to start his own publishing company, the Westview Publishing Company, and its paper, the Westview. Underwood also wrote several books published by the book publishing arm of Westview, including A History of Bellevue and Surrounding Areas, and a memoir titled, Doug Underwood: Boy Reporter. Underwood's daughter, Paula Winters, would go on to run the newspaper and book publishing company until 2010. The book publishing division became Ideas Into Books Westview in 2008.

After Underwood's death in 1995, the Daily News Publishing Company, which also owns Memphis Daily News purchased the paper in 2010 and changed its name to Nashville Ledger. Under editor Lyle Graves' management, paper added public records in print and public notices, information not found in other Nashville publications.
