= The Crockett Times =

- Type: Weekly newspaper
- Format: Broadsheet
- Owner(s): The Crockett Times, Inc.
- Publisher: Richardson Media Group
- Founded: 1873
- Headquarters: Alamo, Tennessee, USA
- Circulation: 4,200
- Website: crockettcountytimes.com

The Crockett Times is a weekly community newspaper serving Crockett County, Tennessee.

== History ==
The paper was first published as The Crockett County Sentinel in 1873. In 1933, Leslie Sims began publishing The Crockett Times and merged the paper with the Sentinel (of Bells) and The Tri-County News (of Friendship). Published in Alamo, it is the oldest continually operated business in Crockett County.

== Sources ==
- History & Genealogy - Newspapers at TSLA
- Rootsweb
- Congressman John Tanner - 8th district media
