= Adams MultiMedia =

American newspaper publisher, founded 2013

Adams Publishing Group LLC
- Type: Private, LLC
- Industry: newspaper, printing, multimedia
- Founded: 2013
- Headquarters: 4095 Coon Rapids Blvd; Coon Rapids, Minnesota 55433, United States
- Key people: Mark Adams CEO; Nickolas Monico COO
- Products: Newspapers; magazines; marketing; tourism & travel; printing; events; digital media
- Website: adamspg.com

Adams Publishing Group LLC (APG) is a company that provides publishing services, including newspapers, periodicals, and website publishing in the United States. Its corporate headquarters is located in Coon Rapids, Minnesota. Mark Adams, son of late billionaire philanthropist Stephen Adams and his first wife, Virginia Ridgway (granddaughter of Ameriprise Financial (formerly American Express Financial Advisors) co-founder John Ridgway), founded Adams Publishing Group in late 2013 after a career in private equity. In March 2014, APG began to acquire newspapers and media related businesses. As of 2022, it owned more than 127 newspapers in 20 states and the District of Columbia.

== Acquisitions ==
In 2014, Adams Publishing Group acquired 34 publications from American Consolidated Media. Later in 2014, Adams Publishing acquired newspapers in southern Minnesota from Huckle Publishing including Chronotype Publishing in Rice Lake, Wisconsin and Athens News (Athens, Ohio). In 2015, Adams Publishing Group purchased the Dundalk Eagle in Maryland.

In 2015, Adams purchased Southern Maryland Newspapers and Comprint Military Publications from The Washington Post. In October 2015, Adams purchased the newspapers of the McCraken Newspaper Group, which included the Wyoming Tribune Eagle and the Laramie Boomerang. In November 2015, Adams purchased the Post Company, which published the daily Idaho Post Register and weekly newspapers Shelley Pioneer, Challis Messenger, and Jefferson Star. In December 2015, Adams purchased The Crescent-News in Defiance, Ohio. In 2016, Adams purchased ECM Publishers, Inc, a Minnesota-based publisher of 50 community newspapers, and Jones Media, a Tennessee-based publisher of 10 community newspapers.

In 2017, Adams acquired a group of newspapers in Mount Airy, North Carolina and The Carroll News in Virginia from Champion Media. In October 2017, Adams announced its acquisition of the Pioneer News Group.

In 2018, Adams acquired Cooke Communications. In June 2019, Adams purchased the Janesville Gazette and the Marinette Eagle Herald in Wisconsin from Bliss Communications.

In late 2022, Adams bought 13 small Montana newspapers from the Yellowstone Newspapers chain. Adams already owned the Bozeman Daily Chronicle and Belgrade News in Montana.

In 2025, Adams Publishing Group renamed itself to Adams MultiMedia. That same year the company acquired The Gazette of Cedar Rapids, Iowa, along with 11 other community papers from Folience.

== Labor disputes ==
In 2021, editorial staff at the Bozeman Daily Chronicle, an Adams owned paper, formed a union, the Yellowstone News Guild, to address low pay, high cost of living, ongoing furloughs and other disputes. As of early 2023, the union was still negotiating with the company for its first contract.

In 2022, the company allegedly fired the news editor of Athens News for running a warning that an advertisement placed by Adam's national ad desk for a collectible coin operation could be fraudulent. Adams disputed the claim.

In 2026, unionized workers at the Skagit Valley Herald staged a one day strike to demand better wages and add limits to the use of artificial intelligence in the newsroom. A new contract was ratified a few months later with stipulations for increased pay and AI usage.

== Adams family ==
Mark Adams, CEO, is a third generation media person. His grandfather, Cedric Adams, was active in CBS radio, television, and the Minneapolis Star/Tribune. His father, Stephen Adams, graduated from Yale and Stanford Business School in 1962 and owned numerous companies that specialized in advertising, publishing, bottling, banking, broadcasting, outdoor advertising, and the largest shareholder of publicly traded Camping World Holdings.

== Media publications ==
Adams MultiMedia has three Divisions: East (Nickolas Monico, Divisional President), Central (Jeff Patterson, Divisional President), and West (Tim Gruber, Divisional President). The newspapers owned by AMM in each division are listed below, along with the location of the newspaper and its publication frequency. AMM also publishes numerous magazines and advertising publications.

=== AMM East ===
Delaware
- Newark Post, Newark, DE, Weekly

Florida

- The Daily Sun, Englewood, North Port Punta Gorda, FL, Daily
- The Florida Keys Free Press, Tavernier, FL, Weekly
- Keys Citizen, Key West, FL, Monday-Saturday
- Sun Weekly – Charlotte County Port Charlotte, Desoto, Punta Gorda, FL, Weekly
- Sun Weekly – Sarasota County, Venice, Englewood, North Port, FL, Weekly
- Venice Gondolier, Venice, FL, Twice Weekly

Maryland

- The Avenue News, Essex, MD, Weekly
- The Susquehanna Press, Elkton, MD, Weekly
- Bay Times and Record-Observer, Chester, MD, Weekly
- The Southern Maryland News, La Plata, MD, Weekly
- Cecil Whig, Elkton, MD, Twice Weekly
- Dorchester Star, Cambridge, MD, Weekly
- The Dundalk Eagle, Dundalk, MD, Weekly
- The Enquirer-Gazette, Largo, MD, Weekly
- Kent County News, Chestertown, MD, Weekly
- The Star Democrat, Easton, MD, Daily
- Tester Naval Air Station at Patuxent River, California, MD, Weekly

North Carolina

- Ashe Post & Times, West Jefferson, NC, Weekly
- The Avery Journal Times, Avery County, NC, Weekly
- Bertie Ledger-Advance, Windsor, NC, Weekly
- The Blowing Rocket, Blowing Rock, NC, Weekly-closed
- Chowan Herald, Edenton, NC, Weekly
- The Daily Advance, Elizabeth City, NC, Daily
- The Daily Reflector, Greenville, NC, Daily
- Duplin Times, Kenansville, NC, Weekly
- The Farmville Enterprise, Farmville, NC, Weekly
- The Mount Airy News, Mount Airy, NC, Daily
- Martin County Enterprise & Weekly Herald, Williamston, NC, Weekly
- The Mountain Times, Boone, Watauga County, NC, Weekly
- The Perquimans Weekly, Hertford, NC, Weekly
- The Pilot, Mounty Airy, NC
- Rocky Mount Telegram, Rocky Mount, NC
- The Standard Laconic, Snow Hill, NC, Weekly
- The Stokes News, King, NC, Weekly
- The Tarboro Weekly, Tarboro, NC, Weekly
- The Times-Leader, Ayden, NC, Weekly
- The Tribune, Elkin, NC, Weekly
- Watauga Democrat, Boone, NC, Twice weekly
- The Yadkin Ripple, Yadkinville, NC, Weekly

Ohio:

- The Athens Messenger, Athens, OH, Daily
- The Athens News, Athens, OH, Twice weekly
- Circleville Herald, Logan, OH, Daily
- The Crescent-News, Defiance, OH, Daily
- The Logan Daily News, Logan, OH, 3x/week
- Perry County Tribune, New Lexington, OH, Weekly
- The Pike County News Watchman, Waverly, OH, Twice weekly
- The Vinton County Courier, McArthur, OH, Weekly

Tennessee:

- The Advocate & Democrat, Sweetwater, TN, Weekly
- The Connection, Tellico Village, TN, Weekly
- The Daily Post Athenian, Athens, TN, Twice weekly
- The Daily Times, Maryville, TN, Mon-Sat
- The Greeneville Sun, Greeneville, TN, Tuesday-Saturday
- The Herald-News, Dayton, TN, Weekly
- The Newport Plain Talk, Newport, TN, Weekly
- News-Herald, Loudon County, TN, Weekly
- The Rogersville Review, Rogersville, TN, Weekly
- Touring Publications, Sevierville, TN, Travel and Tourism

Virginia:

- Carroll News, Hillsville, VA, Weekly
- Pentagram, Fort Myer, VA, Weekly

=== AMM West ===
Idaho:
- Bingham News Chronicle, Blackfoot, ID, Weekly
- Boise Weekly, Boise, ID, Weekly
- Challis Messenger, Challis, ID, Weekly
- The Idaho Press, Nampa, ID, Daily
- Idaho State Journal, Pocatello, ID, Daily
- Jefferson Star, Rigby, ID, Weekly
- Meridian-Kuna Press, Kuna and Meridian, ID, Weekly
- Messenger Index, Emmett, ID, Weekly
- News-Examiner, Montpelier, ID, Weekly
- Post Register, Idaho Falls, ID, Daily
- Preston Citizen, Preston, ID, Weekly
- Standard Journal, Rexburg, ID, Twice weekly
- Teton Valley News, Driggs, ID, Weekly

Montana:

- Belgrade News, Belgrade, MT, Weekly
- Bozeman Daily Chronicle, Bozeman, MT, Daily
- Livingston Enterprise, Livingston, MT
- Miles City Star, Miles City, MT
- Glendive Ranger-Review, Glendive, MT
- Lewistown News-Argus, Lewistown, MT
- Dillon Tribune, Dillon, MT
- Big Timber Pioner, Big Timber, MT
- Laurel Outlook, Laurel, MT
- Carbon County News, Red Lodge, MT
- Big Horn County News, Hardin, MT
- Stillwater County News, Columbus, MT
- Terry Tribune, Terry, MT
- Independent Press, Forsyth, MT
- Judith Basin Press, Judith Basin, MT

Oregon:

- Herald and News, Klamath Falls, OR, Daily
- Lake County Examiner, Lakeview, OR, Weekly

Utah:

- The Herald Journal, Logan, UT, Daily
- The Leader, Tremonton, UT, Weekly

Washington:

- Anacortes American, Anacortes, WA, Weekly
- Argus, Burlington, WA, Weekly
- Courier Times, Sedro-Woolley, WA, Weekly
- Daily Record, Ellensburg, WA, Daily
- Skagit Valley Herald, Mount Vernon, WA, Daily
- Stanwood Camano News, Stanwood, WA, Weekly
- Your Fidalgo, Anacortes, WA, Weekly

Wyoming:

- Laramie Boomerang, Laramie, WY, Daily
- Laramie Marketplace, Laramie, WY, Weekly
- Southeast Wyoming Extra, Cheyenne, WY, Weekly
- Rawlins Daily Times, Rawlins, WY, Twice Weekly
- Rock Springs Daily Rocket-Miner, Rock Springs, WY, Twice Weekly
- Wyoming Business Report, Cheyenne, WY, Monthly
- Wyoming Tribune-Eagle, Cheyenne, WY, Daily

=== AMM Central ===
Iowa:
- The Gazette, Cedar Rapids, IA, Daily
- Hometown Current, Marengo, IA, Weekly
- Southeast Iowa Union, Washington, IA, Twice Weekly
- Washington Evening Journal, Washington, IA, Daily

Minnesota

- Aitkin Independent Age, Aitkin, Weekly
- Apple Valley Sun ThisWeek, Apple Valley, Weekly
- Blaine Spring Lake Park Life, Coon Rapids, Weekly
- Bloomington-Richfield Sun Current, Bloomington and Richfield, Weekly
- Brooklyn Center Sun Post, Brooklyn Center, Weekly
- Brooklyn Park Sun Post, Brooklyn Park, Weekly
- Burnsville / Eagan Sun Thisweek, Burnsville, Weekly
- The Caledonia Argus, Caledonia, Weekly
- Carver County News, Watertown, Weekly
- Champlin-Dayton-Osseo-Maple Grove Press, four cities in Hennepin County, Weekly
- Chisholm Tribune-Press, Chisholm, Weekly
- Columbia Heights / Fridley Sun Focus, Fridley, Weekly
- Crow River News, Osseo, Weekly
- Crystal-Robbinsdale Sun Post, Crystal, Weekly
- Dakota County Tribune, Apple ValleyWeekly
- Eden Prairie Sun Current, Eden Prairie, Weekly
- Edina Sun Current, Edina, Weekly
- Excelsior / Shorewood Sun Sailor, Edina, Weekly
- Faribault Daily News, Faribault, Daily, Tuesday thru Saturday
- Forest Lake Times, Forest Lake, Weekly
- The Gazette, Stillwater, Weekly
- Grand Rapids Herald-Review, Grand Rapids, Weekly
- Hibbing Daily Tribune, Hibbing, Daily, except Monday
- Hopkins / Minnetonka Sun Sailor, Minnetonka, Daily
- Isanti County Times, Cambridge, Weekly
- The Kenyon Leader, Kenyon, Weekly
- Laker Pioneer, Wayzata, Weekly
- Lakeville Sun Thisweek, Lakeville, Weekly
- Le Center Leader, Le Center, Weekly
- Le Sueur News-Herald, Le Sueur, Weekly
- Le Sueur County News, Le Sueur, Weekly
- The Leader, Blooming Prairie, Ellendale, Weekly
- Lonsdale Area News-Review, Lonsdale, Weekly
- Mesabi Daily News, Virginia, Daily, except Monday
- Mille Lacs Messenger, Isle, Weekly
- Monticello Times, Monticello, Weekly
- Morrison County Record, Little Falls, Weekly
- Mounds View / New Brighton Sun Focus, Mounds View, Weekly
- New Hope / Golden Valley Sun Post, Golden Valley, Weekly
- Northfield News, Northfield, Weekly
- Norwood Young America Times, Norwood Young America, Weekly
- The Pilot-Independent, Walker, Weekly
- Owatonna People's Press, Owatonna, Daily, Tuesday thru Saturday
- Plymouth Sun Sailor, Plymouth, Weekly
- The Post Review, Cambridge, Weekly
- Star News, Elk River, Weekly
- St. Louis Park Sun Sailor, St. Louis Park, Weekly
- St. Peter Herald, Saint Peter, Weekly
- Sun-Post, Brooklyn Center & Brooklyn Park, Weekly
- Union-Times, Princeton, Weekly
- Waconia Patriot, Waconia, Weekly
- Walker Pilot-Independent, Walker, Weekly
- Waseca County News, Weekly

Wisconsin:

- Antigo Daily Journal, Antigo, WI, Daily
- Ashland Daily Press, Ashland, WI, Weekly
- Beloit Daily News, Beloit, WI, Daily
- Cambridge News & Deerfield Independent, Cambridge & Deerfield, WI, Weekly
- The Chronotype, Rice Lake, WI, Weekly
- The Country Today, Eau Claire, WI, Weekly
- The Courier, Waterloo & Marshall, WI, Weekly
- Daily Jefferson County Union, Fort Atkinson, WI, Daily
- DeForest Times-Tribune, DeForest, WI, Weekly
- Eagle Herald, Marinette, WI, Daily
- The Gazette, Janesville, WI, Daily
- Herald-Independent & McFarland Thistle, Cottage Grove, Monona & McFarland, WI, Weekly
- Lake Mills Leader, Lake Mills, WI, Weekly
- Leader-Telegram, Eau Claire, WI, Daily, Weekdays only
- Lodi Enterprise & Poynette Press, Lodi & Poynette, WI, Weekly
- Milton Courier, Milton, WI, Weekly
- Price County Review, Park Falls, Phillips, WI, Weekly
- Sawyer County Record, Hayward, WI, Weekly
- Spooner Advocate, Spooner, WI, Weekly
- Sun Prairie Star, Sun Prairie, WI, Twice Weekly
- Watertown Daily Times, Watertown, WI, Daily
- Waunakee Tribune, Waunakee, WI, Weekly
