= The Gazette (Janesville, Wisconsin) =

Daily newspaper

- Type: Daily newspaper
- Format: Broadsheet
- Owner: Adams MultiMedia
- Editor: Tim Sullivan
- Founded: 1845
- Headquarters: 1 S. Parker Drive, Janesville, Wisconsin, 53545
- Circulation: 10,251 (as of 2022)
- Website: gazettextra.com

The Gazette is a daily newspaper in Janesville, Wisconsin. The newspaper is owned by Adams MultiMedia.

== History ==
The Gazette was established on August 14, 1845, by Levi Alden and E. A. Stoddard. It was initially a Whig partisan newspaper and published only a weekly edition. Alden owned it for the first decade in partnership with a number of different prominent Rock County Whigs until selling his remaining ownership to his last partner, Charles Holt, in 1855. The paper passed through a number of other owners before being purchased by Howard Bliss in he 1880s.

It was sold to Adams Publishing Group in 2019; prior to then, it had been owned by the Bliss family for 136 years. While it had previously published every day of the week, the newspaper suspended its Saturday and Sunday editions in June 2020 due to the financial impact of the COVID-19 pandemic.
