= The Daily Times (Blount County, Tennessee) =

Daily newspaper in Tennessee, US

- Your life. Your times.
- Type: Daily newspaper
- Owner: Adams MultiMedia
- Editor: Mike Sisco
- General manager: Darren Haimer
- Founded: 1883; 143 years ago
- Headquarters: 226 Gill Street, Alcoa, TN
- Circulation: 4,876 (as of 2025)
- Website: https://www.thedailytimes.com/

The Daily Times is a newspaper based in Maryville, Tennessee, United States. Founded in 1883, it primarily circulates within Blount County, at the foothills of the Great Smoky Mountains.
