= The Daily Post Athenian =

Daily Post Athenian
- Type: Daily newspaper
- Owner: Adams MultiMedia
- Founded: 1848
- Circulation: 7,580 (as of 2019)
- Website: dailypostathenian.com

The Daily Post Athenian is a newspaper serving Athens in the U.S. state of Tennessee. It is the merger of the Athens Post and the Athenian. The Daily Post Athenian is currently published online and in print for home delivery.

== History ==
It was preceded by the Knoxville Post.

The Athens Post was founded in 1848 as a weekly. It ceased publication in 1917. The Athenian was founded in 1883, with an 1886 circulation of about 1,000. In its early history it billed itself as a Republican newspaper published weekly on Fridays.

The Post-Athenian was purchased in 1930 by Fred Wankan, and on March 16, 1931, was relaunched as a daily under the name The Daily Post-Athenian.
