= Monroe County Advocate & Democrat =

Local newspaper

- Type: Weekly newspaper
- Owner: Adams MultiMedia
- City: Athens, Tennessee
- Circulation: 2,908 (as of 2019)
- Website: advocateanddemocrat.com

The Monroe County Advocate & Democrat is a newspaper headquartered in Athens, Tennessee, USA.
