= Cherry Hill School (Maryland) =

School in Mitchellville, Maryland, USA (1874–1919)

Coordinates: 38.92309°N 76.80307°W

Cherry Hill School was a one-room schoolhouse that once stood at the intersection of Enterprise and Lottsford Roads in Mitchellville (central Prince George's County) Maryland USA. The school opened in 1874, serving children in the local area until it closed in 1919.

== History ==
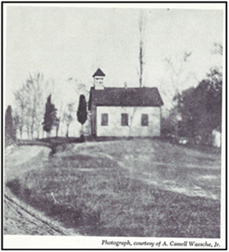

The Cherry Hill School was also known as the Duckett School House, named for the Duckett family who permitted the school to be built on a portion of its plantation (see J. Duckett on the map below). During this time period, farmers who owned land that was unsuitable for farming or who wanted schoolhouses to be built near to their homes for their children to conveniently attend would often donate the land and, perhaps, construct schoolhouses for the benefit of local children.

The Baist map (below) shows the location of the Cherry Hill School (abbreviation: Sch. Ho.) as well as annotations showing nearby roads and the location of an extant landmark, the Holy Family Catholic Church and School (abbreviation: Holy Family Cath. Ch. & Sch).

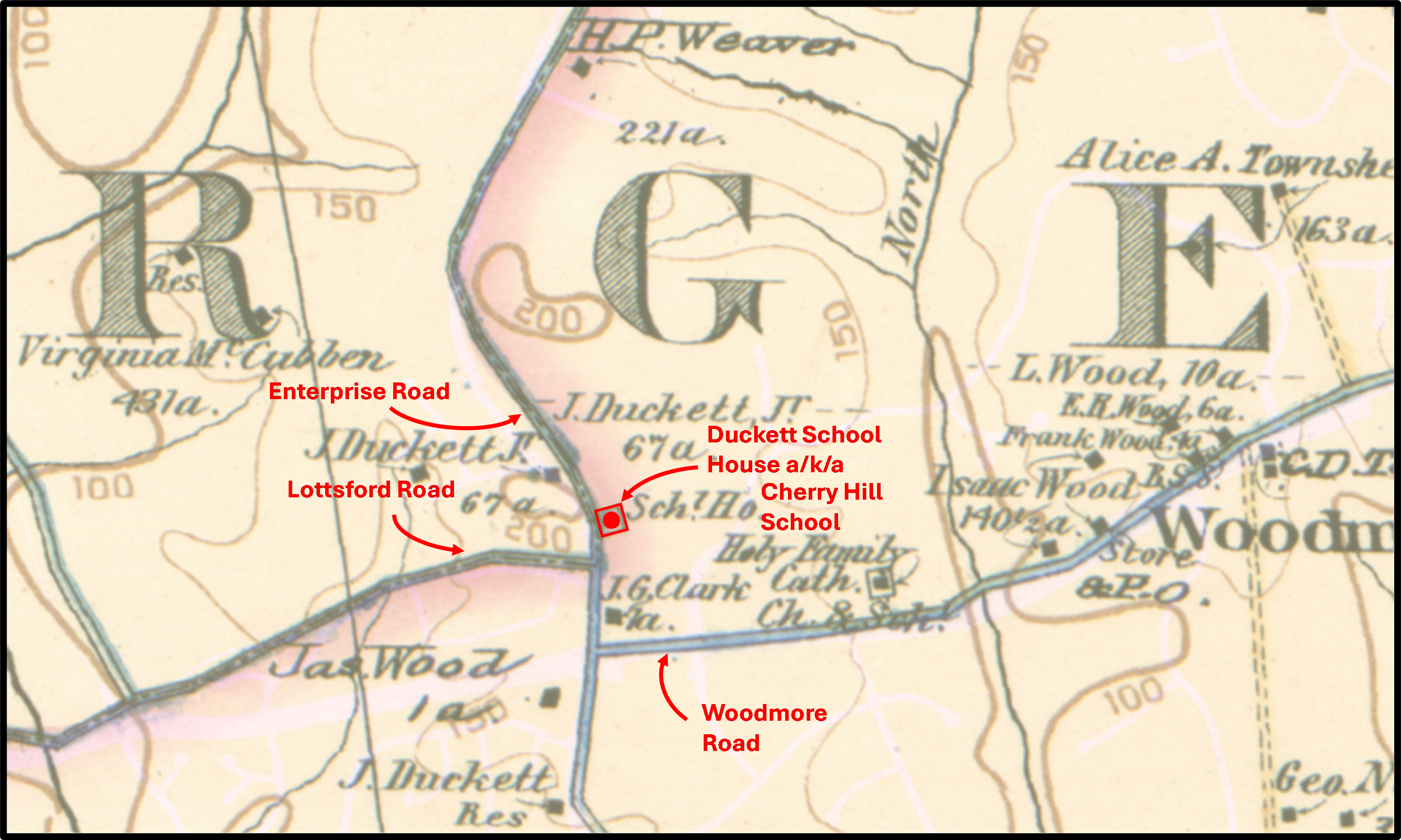

The Cherry Hill School was representative of one-room schoolhouses at the time, of which there were more than 200,000 built in America. Phyllis McIntosh wrote that these facilities "...provided the only education available to most rural Americans..." from the early 1800s to mid-1900s. During this time, she continued, "...the landscape was dotted with these tiny centers of learning, where indomitable teachers combining the skills of educator, nurse, counselor, and drill sergeant presided over a roomful of students who could range in age from 5 to 20." Beginning in the 1870s, McIntosh claimed that these one-room schoolhouses began exhibiting such features as painted exteriors, usually white, and bell towers, also known as belfries. Yet, in this period, the facilities were uncomfortable and not conducive to learning. A single stove would typically heat the building, providing uneven heating, and with the lack of electricity, lighting was often insufficient for study. Restrooms were in outhouses and wells would provide drinking water. Often there was only one drinking cup to share among the pupils.

The school bell

A distinctive feature of the Cherry Hill School was the school bell that rang from its bell tower. When the school opened in 1874, construction included a bell tower, but there was no bell. The bell was installed and dedicated in 1896.

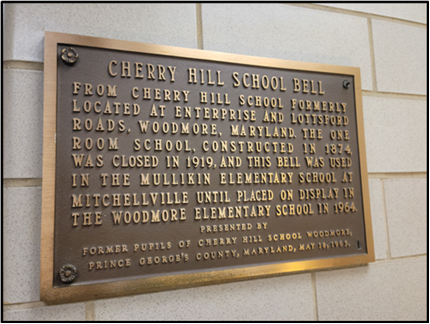

When the Cherry Hill School was closed in 1919, it was replaced by the six-classroom Mullikin Elementary School. The Cherry Hill School bell was installed in the second floor stairwell of Mullikin where it was rung to "call" students until it was ultimately replaced by an electric bell. When the nearby Woodmore Elementary School replaced Mullikin in 1964, Cherry Hill School's bell was restored, dedicated, and put on display in the new school. Now, more than a century and a half after the Cherry Hill School was built, its school bell is once again being moved as the Woodmore Elementary School will be replaced by the new Fairwood Elementary School, where the school principal is committed dedication special space for the bell and its plaque to be installed.

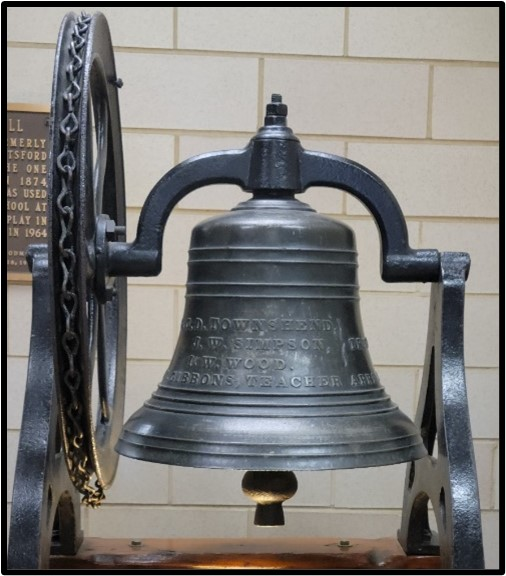

Although Cherry Hill School is long gone, fortunately, its bell has been preserved.
