= Prince George's Enquirer and Southern Maryland Advertiser =

Defunct American newspaper

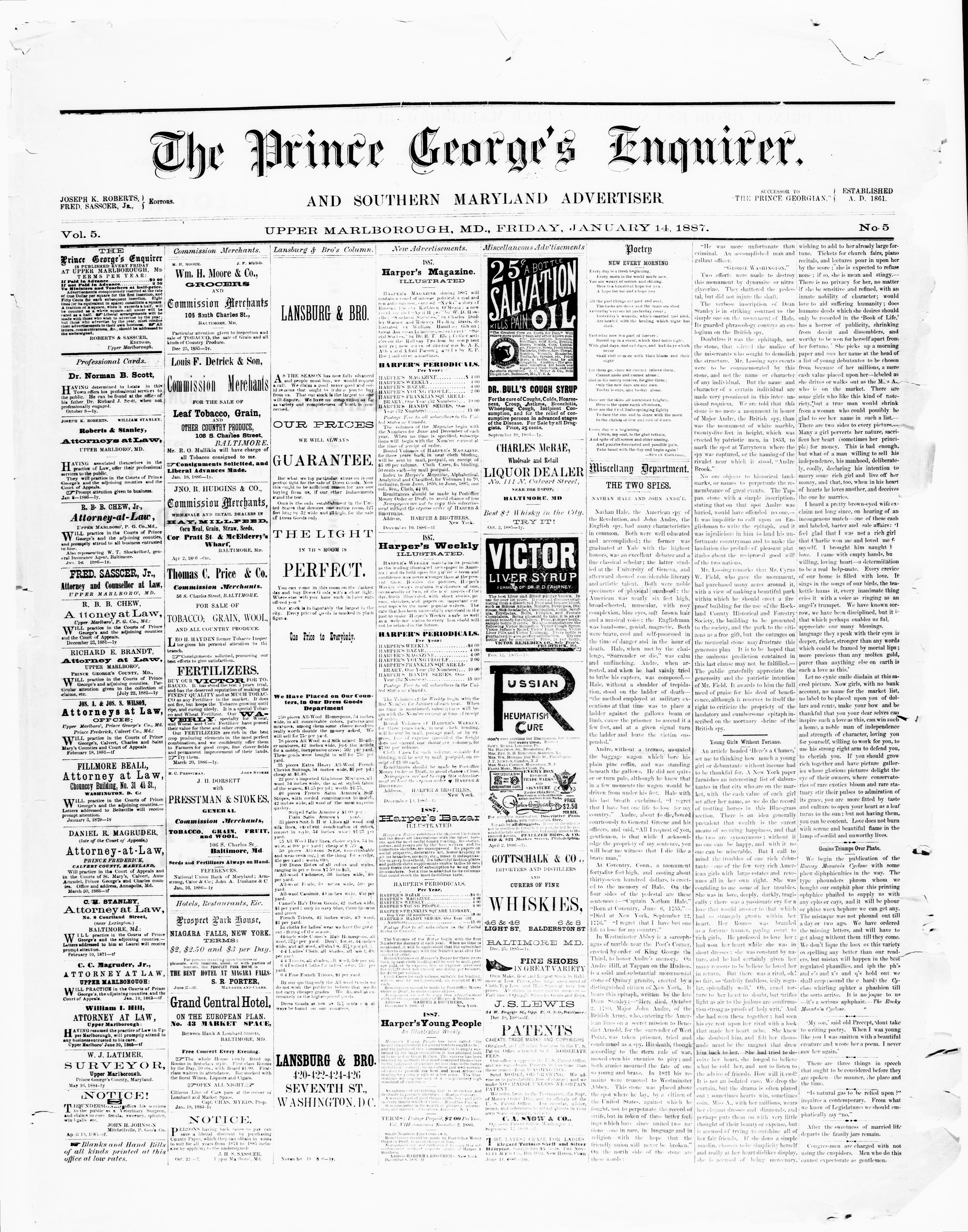
- The cover page of the January 14, 1887 issue
- Type: Weekly newspaper
- Founder(s): Joseph K. Roberts & Frederick Sasscer Jr.
- Editor: Frederick Sasscer, Jr.
- Founded: 1882
- Ceased publication: January 30, 1925
- Relaunched: The Enquirer-Gazette
- Language: English
- Headquarters: Upper Marlboro, Maryland, U.S.
- ISSN: 2475-4323
- OCLC number: 20367539

The Prince George's Enquirer and Southern Maryland Advertiser was a weekly newspaper published from 1882 to January 30, 1925, in Upper Marlboro, Maryland. It replaced a paper that had been established during the American Civil War by Michael J. Slayman, The Prince Georgian and Southern Maryland Advertiser. The Enquirer was founded by Joseph K. Roberts and Frederick Sasscer, Jr., both politically well-connected lawyers from Upper Marlboro. Roberts died in 1888, but Sasscer continued to edit the paper and eventually became its owner, solidifying the paper's political stance as staunchly Democratic. In 1909, an apprentice working for the paper, Samuel A. Wyvill, became part owner. Together, Sasscer and Wyvill bought the Marlboro Gazette from Mary and Charles Wilson on January 30, 1925, and named the new merged paper The Enquirer-Gazette. Frederick Sasscer remained editor until his death in 1929. The Enquirer-Gazette continues to publish issues to this day.

Like other newspapers in Prince George's County, the Enquirer paid particular attention to local staple crops such as tobacco, which remained a key market indicator. The Enquirer also kept record of local social events such as gatherings of antebellum families that featured anachronistic displays like jousting. Around the turn of the 20th century, William Woodward Sr.'s purchase of Belair Mansion and subsequent establishment of a thoroughbred race horse breeding and training operation became a popular subject for local papers – including the Enquirer and Enquirer-Gazette.
