= The Enquirer-Gazette =

Weekly newspaper published in Upper Marlboro, Maryland, US

- Type: Weekly newspaper
- Format: Tall Tabloid
- Owner: Adams MultiMedia
- Founder(s): Frederick Sasscer, Jr. & Samuel A. Wyvill
- President: Jim Normandin
- Editor-in-chief: Eli Wohlenhaus
- Editor: Jesse Yeatman
- Founded: January 30, 1925
- Language: English
- Headquarters: Upper Marlboro, Maryland
- Circulation: 222 (as of 2021)
- OCLC number: 20058651
- Website: somdnews.com/enquirer_gazette

The Enquirer-Gazette is a weekly newspaper published in Upper Marlboro, Maryland.

== History ==
The newspaper was founded on January 30, 1925, when Frederick Sasscer, Jr. and his partner Samuel A. Wyvill purchased the Marlboro Gazette from Mary and Charles Wilson, combining it with the paper they previously owned, the Prince George's Enquirer and Southern Maryland Advertiser. Sasscer remained editor of the Enquirer-Gazette until his death in 1929.

The paper continues to be published, with the Adams Publishing Group as publisher, Jim Normandin acting as president and Joy Tyler as editor.
