= The Daily News (Memphis) =

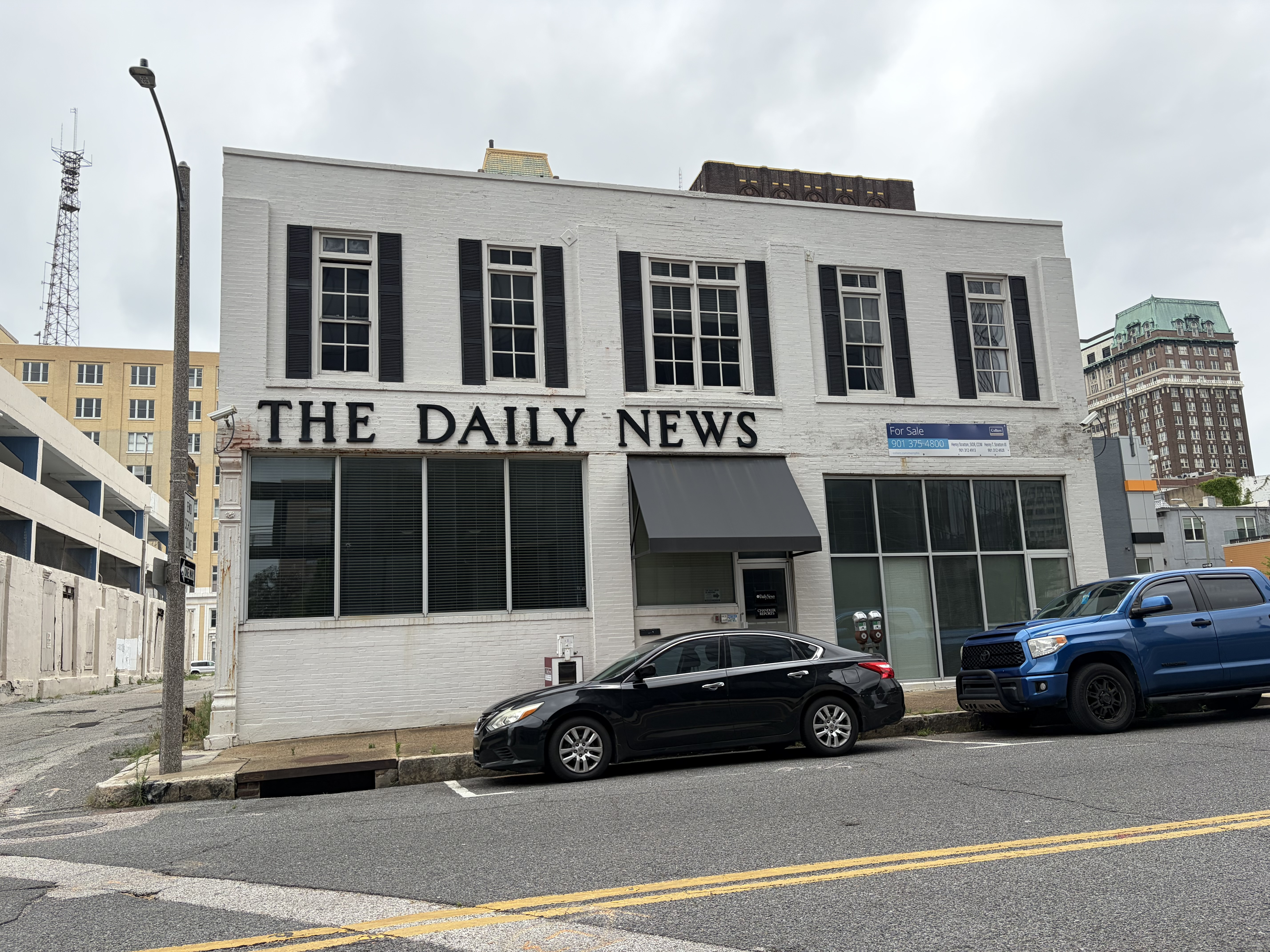
- The Daily News office in downtown Memphis
- Owner: The Daily News Publishing Co. Inc.
- Founded: 1886
- Headquarters: 193 Jefferson Ave. Memphis, TN 38103
- Website: memphisdailynews.com

The Daily News is a newspaper covering business, government and legal news in Shelby County, Tennessee, United States, the largest county by population in the state of Tennessee, including the largest city in the county, Memphis, Tennessee. The Daily News, which is published Monday through Friday, is the paper of record for the county. It was founded in 1886 and is the successor to three legal newspapers: The Daily Record, The Daily Court Reporter and The Daily Court News.

The Daily News includes public notices, public records and editorial content. Public notices include notices of foreclosure, notices of tax sales and notices of government bids. Public records include real estate transactions, court filings, court calendars and business licenses. Editorial content includes news of general interest, including legal news, business news and coverage of local government. Similar papers are published in cities similar in size to Memphis but are more often published as weeklies, making the Daily News somewhat unusual.
