= List of newspapers in Montana =

Newspapers published in Montana

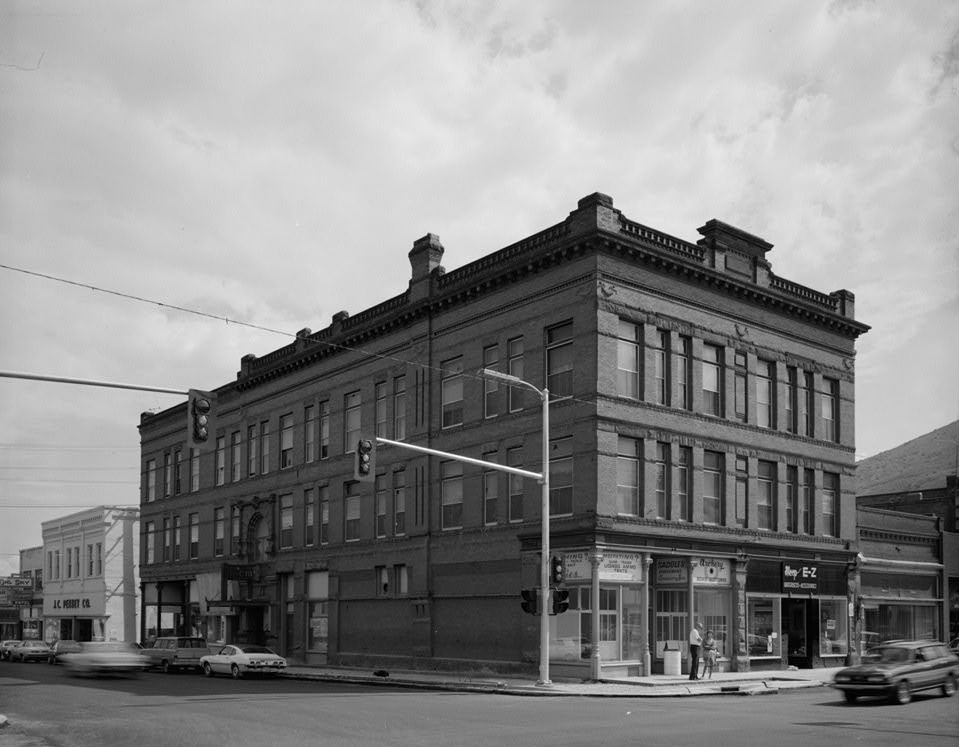
Durston Building, Anaconda

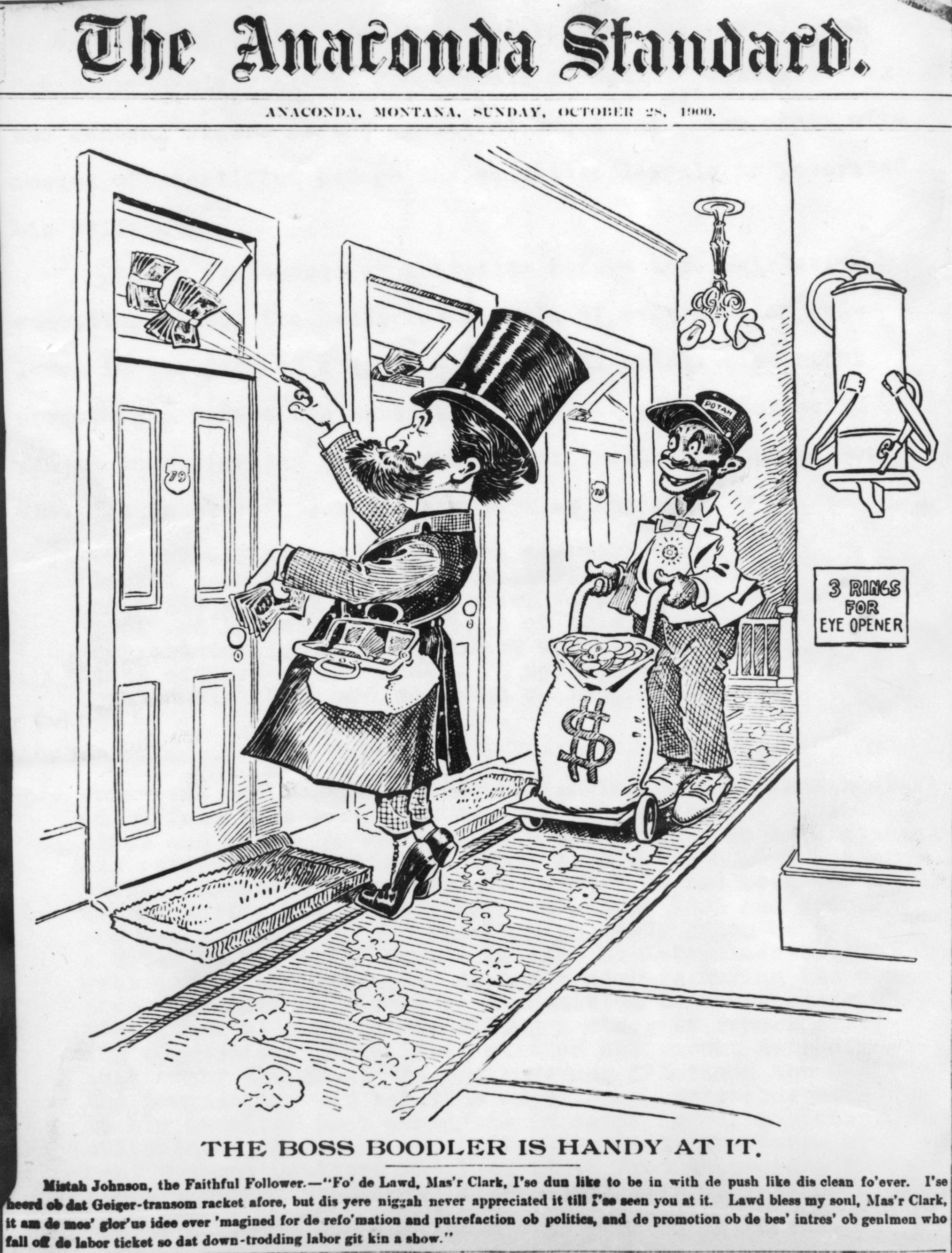
William A. Clark - The Anaconda Standard political cartoon, 28 Oct 1900

This is a list of newspapers in Montana.

== Current news publications ==
- Anaconda Leader - Anaconda
- Belgrade News - Belgrade
- Big Horn County News - Hardin
- The Big Timber Pioneer - Big Timber
- Bigfork Eagle - Bigfork
- Billings Gazette - Billings
- The Bitterroot Star - Stevensville
- Blackfoot Valley Dispatch - Lincoln
- Blaine County Journal News-Opinion - Chinook
- Boulder Monitor - Boulder
- Bozeman Daily Chronicle - Bozeman
- Carbon County News - Red Lodge
- Cascade Courier - Cascade
- Char-Koosta News - Pablo
- Choteau Acantha - Choteau
- Circle Banner - Circle
- Clark Fork Valley Press - Plains
- Cut Bank Pioneer Press - Cut Bank
- Daily Inter Lake - Kalispell
- Daniels County Leader - Scobey
- Dillon Tribune - Dillon
- The Ekalaka Eagle - Ekalaka
- Fairfield Sun Times - Fairfield
- Fallon County Times - Baker
- Flathead Beacon - Kalispell
- Glacier-Reporter - Browning
- Glasgow Courier - Glasgow
- Glendive Ranger-Review - Glendive
- Great Falls Tribune - Great Falls
- Havre Weekly Chronicle - Havre
- Hungry Horse News - Columbia Falls
- The Independent-Observer - Conrad
- Independent Press - Forsyth
- Independent Record - Helena
- Judith Basin Press - Stanford
- Kootenai Valley Record - Libby
- Lake County Leader - Polson
- Laurel Outlook - Laurel
- Lewistown News-Argus - Lewistown
- Livingston Enterprise - Livingston
- The Madisonian - Ennis
- Meagher County News - White Sulphur Springs
- Miles City Star - Miles City
- Mineral Independent - Plains
- Missoulian - Missoula
- Montana Free Press - Helena
- Montana Kaimin - Missoula
- Montana Standard - Butte
- The Montanian - Libby
- The Mountaineer - Big Sandy
- The MSU Exponent - Bozeman
- Northern Plains Independent - Wolf Point
- Phillips County News - Malta
- The Philipsburg Mail - Philipsburg
- Powder River Examiner - Broadus
- Ravalli Republic - Hamilton
- The River Press - Fort Benton
- The Roundup - Sidney
- Roundup Record-Tribune - Roundup
- Sanders County Ledger - Thompson Falls
- Seeley Swan Pathfinder - Seeley Lake
- Shelby Promoter - Shelby
- Sheridan County News - Plentywood
- Sidney Herald - Sidney
- Silver State Post - Deer Lodge
- Stillwater County News - Columbus
- Terry Tribune - Terry
- Three Forks Voice - Three Forks
- The Times-Clarion - Harlowton
- Tobacco Valley News - Eureka
- The Valierian - Valier
- Valley Journal - Ronan
- The Western News - Libby
- Whitefish Pilot - Whitefish
- Whitehall Ledger - Whitehall
- The Wibaux Pioneer-Gazette - Wibaux
- Yellowstone County News - Huntley

== Defunct ==
- Belgrade Journal (1906–1973)
- Copper Commando (1942-1945)
- The Daily Missoulian - Missoula (1904–1961)
- Butte Post (1881-1961)

== See also ==
- List of newspapers
- List of newspapers in the United States
- List of African-American newspapers in Montana
- List of defunct newspapers of the United States
- List of newspapers in the United States by circulation
