= David P. Bond =

American writer

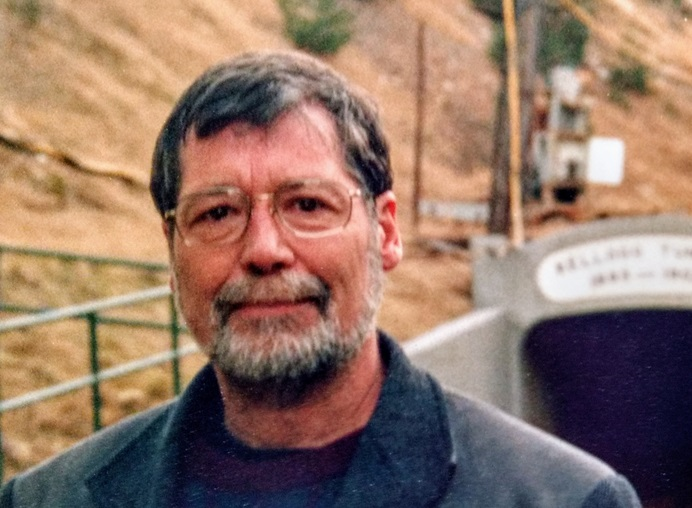
- Bond in front of a mine in the Silver Valley
- Born: David Preston Bond; April 11, 1954; Santa Rosa, California, U.S.
- Died: February 16, 2020; Wallace, Idaho, U.S.
- Education: Willamette University
- Occupations: Journalist; Advocate; Author; Satirist
- Spouse(s): Christy Lynn Rogers (m. 1972, divorced) Barbara A. Truitt (m. 1985, divorced) Rowene C. Carle (m. 1985, divorced) Andrea "Kazia" Tessler (m. 2018, till death)
- Writing career
- Notable works: Wallace Street Journal; Silver Valley Mining Journal; The Silver Pennies; An Investor’s Guide to U.S. Silver Stocks

David Preston Bond (April 11, 1951 – February 16, 2020) was a newspaper reporter, columnist, and editor based in the American Northwest. He chronicled and supported North Idaho’s mining industry over much of his career. "Bond considered himself a defender of the blue-collar man," one tribute added, "who didn’t hesitate to take on big government and those he considered a threat to their livelihood."

== Early life and education ==
Bond was born in Santa Rosa, California. His adoptive parents, Richard and Patty (née Hendrickson) Bond, of Spokane, Washington, were both graduates of the University of California, Berkeley, where, in their senior years, Richard was student body president and Patty, vice president. Richard "Dick" Bond was a natural gas company executive and a Washington State legislator from 1975 to 1987. The family relocated from Spokane to Nanaimo, BC, on Vancouver Island, in 1957 and returned to Spokane in 1965, where David attended Ferris High School. He served as a page in the Washington state's legislature in his junior year. After high school, in June, 1969, he enrolled at Willamette University in Salem, Oregon, where he studied English and political science. David left Willamette a few credits short of graduation.

== Journalism career ==
Bond's professional journalism career started at the Capital Journal in Salem, Oregon in the summer of 1973 while still a Willamette undergraduate. His bylined column reviewed newly released popular and folk music albums, giving free rein to 22-year-old Bond's aesthetic judgments and literary gifts.

In the latter half of the 1970s he held posts with the Seattle Post-Intelligencer, the Coeur d'Alene Press (city editor), and the North Idaho Press and Wallace Miner (managing editor of both; both owned by Harry F. Magnuson). Bond freelanced and served as a spokesman for North Idaho's Sunshine Mine in the early 1980s. In 1984 he was hired by the Spokesman-Review and Spokane Chronicle in Spokane, soon after the two newspapers combined their news staffs. In the summer of 1988 he commenced writing a biweekly column for the Spokesman-Review datelined from a fictional "Patmos, Idaho."

In 1990, Bond left journalism briefly and lived on his sloop in Puget Sound.

In July, 1991 he returned to journalism, now once again at the Coeur d'Alene Press. Businessman and publisher Duane Hagadone, hired Bond initially there to address the controversial issue of summertime field burning by local farmers. Bond remained at the Press through 1997. From 1998 onward Bond defined his status as an "independent writer," largely focusing on mining, the EPA, and North Idaho's current affairs. He contributed to the local Shoshone News-Press as a freelancer and columnist. From 2003 to 2010 Bond, with partner Shauna Hillman, orchestrated Silver Summit, Inc. investment conferences, annual gatherings devoted to the promotion of silver and the silver market and convened in a succession of cities, including Spokane, Washington, Coeur d’Alene, and Wallace. Bond also launched two publications in this period, the Wallace Street Journal and the Silver Valley Mining Journal. His book, The Silver Pennies: An Investor's Guide to U.S. Silver Stocks came out in 2005. Also in 2005, Bond played a key role in Mayor Ron Garitone's proclamation, on September 25, that the City of Wallace, Idaho lay at "The Center of the Universe." Bond supplied the philosophical justification for this claim – it, a spoof highlighting his contention that the EPA relied on unfalsifiable science. Bond traveled extensively on behalf of mining pursuits. From 2006 to 2014 Bond reported on the mining industry for Platts Metals Weekly, a McGraw-Hill publication, and was a featured contributor to The Free-Market News. More recently, his posts on Facebook gained a wide following.

== The Paradis case ==
In December 1981, Donald Manuel Paradis, of the Gypsy Jokers motorcycle gang, was convicted of the June 21, 1980 murder of Kimberly Anne Palmer, 19. Paradis was sentenced to death by the Kootenai County district court in Coeur d’Alene. A long series of appeals ensued. Both the Idaho court's jurisdiction and Paradis's responsibility for the murder were contested. In the mid-1990s, with legal channels exhausted, Paradis's defense turned to the court of public opinion. National attention for the case was gained via CBS's Sixty Minutes TV newsmagazine, The New Yorker, and numerous other media outlets. Locally, David Bond stood alone among journalists in his advocacy for Paradis. When Paradis finally won release from prison in April, 2001, Bond was widely credited. "Dave Bond believed in me," Paradis noted. "And he got a whole bunch of people to believe in me."

== Silver Valley Mining and the Environmental Protection Agency ==
After 2000, and in response to Environmental Protection Agency (EPA)’s plan to expand its Superfund site at Kellogg, Idaho to the entire Coeur d’Alene River Basin, Bond became sharply critical of the agency. One commentary, written in July, 2001, satirically suggested locals should arm themselves against incursions onto their properties by EPA personnel. EPA responded by increasing the police presence at a subsequent community meeting.

== Personal life ==
Bond married four times, to Christy Lynn Rogers (9 September 1972 – 1 January 1980), Barbara A. Truitt (divorced, 4 October 1985), Rowene C. Carle (12 December 1985 – 9 November 1989), and Andrea "Kazia" Tessler (14 February 2018 – 16 February 2020, upon his death). His third wife, Rowene Bond, bore him two daughters. Bond and Shauna Hillman, of Wallace, Idaho, shared a long relationship between his third and fourth marriages. Beyond journalism, Bond was a ham radio operator licensed in Morse code (in teen years), a general aviation pilot, a skilled sailor, and an aficionado of vacuum tube electronics and vinyl records. He valued an especially close friendship and work relationship with Kellogg, Idaho mine owner Robert Hopper until Hopper's death in 2011. Bond maintained an enduring distrust and distaste for the wholly abstemious life. His first-person account of alcohol rehab, published in 1989, won a Pacific Northwest Excellence in Journalism Award.

== Death ==
Bond died of natural causes at Coeur d’Alene, Idaho on February 16, 2020, at age 65.

== See also ==
- Lake Coeur d'Alene
- Coeur d'Alene River
- Silver Valley, Idaho
- Superfund Sites in Idaho
