= List of African American newspapers in Montana =

First page of the first issue of The Colored Citizen from September 1894.

This is a list of African American newspapers that have been published in the state of Montana.

Montana's first such newspaper was The Colored Citizen, published in Helena in the fall of 1894. During this period of the late 19th and early 20th centuries, the African American population of Montana fluctuated between 1000 and 1500 people.

Montana has the unique position of being entirely surrounded by states (Idaho, Wyoming, North Dakota and South Dakota) that have never had an African American newspaper. The state's early Black press accordingly covered a particularly wide geographic sweep, and many of Montana's early African American papers carried news from communities in other Western states. Some other states' newspapers returned the favor: the Seattle Northwest Enterprise ran a column of Montana news from the 1920s to 1960s.

== Newspapers ==
City	Title	Beginning	End	Frequency	Call numbers	Remarks
Butte	The New Age or Montana New Age	1902	1903?	Weekly	ISSN 2326-9669, 2326-9650; LCCN 2013218599, sn84036148; OCLC 828631031, 11076647	Available online; Carried local news from California, Utah, Washington, and Idaho in addition to various Montana cities.
Fort Harrison	Knocker	1902	?			Known only through mentions in other papers.
Helena	The Colored Citizen	1894	1894	Weekly	ISSN 2326-9693, 2326-9685; LCCN 2013218600, sn84036198; OCLC 828631189, 11254796	Available online; Edited by J.P. Ball Jr., son of James Presley Ball.; Carried local news from Billings and Seattle as well as Helena.; Published from September 3 to November 6, 1894, shutting down after the 1894 Montana elections.
Helena	The Montana Plaindealer	1906	1911	Variable: weekly, monthly, or irregular	LCCN sn84036199; OCLC 11254801	Available online; Edited and published by Joseph Blackburn Bass, who earlier published the Topeka Call and later edited the California Eagle.
Helena	Reporter	1899?	1901	Twice monthly		
Missoula	Everybody	1959	1987			

== See also ==
- List of African American newspapers and media outlets
- List of newspapers in Montana

== Works cited ==
- Abajian, James De Tarr (1974). Blacks and Their Contributions to the American West: A Bibliography and Union List of Library Holdings Through 1970. G. K. Hall. ISBN 9780816111398.
- Berardi, Gayle K.; Segady, Thomas W. (1990). "The Development of African-American Newspapers in the American West: A Sociohistorical Perspective". The Journal of Negro History. 75 (3/4): 96–111. doi:10.2307/3031501. JSTOR 3031501. S2CID 142393523.
- Danky, James Philip; Hady, Maureen E., eds. (1998). African-American newspapers and periodicals : a national bibliography. Harvard University Press. ISBN 9780674007888.
- Junne, George H. (2000). Blacks in the American West and Beyond--America, Canada, and Mexico: A Selectively Annotated Bibliography. Greenwood Publishing Group. ISBN 9780313312083.
- Pride, Armistead Scott; Wilson, Clint C. (1997). A History of the Black Press. Howard University Press. ISBN 9780882581927.
- Smith, Jessie Carney (2012). Black Firsts: 4,000 Ground-Breaking and Pioneering Historical Events. Visible Ink Press. ISBN 9781578593699.
