= Hagadone =

Hagadone is a surname. Notable people with the surname include:

- Duane Hagadone (1932–2021), American businessman and philanthropist
- Nick Hagadone (born 1986), American baseball player
