= News-Press =

News-Press may refer to:

- Santa Barbara News-Press, Santa Barbara, California
- The News-Press, Fort Myers, Florida, owned by the USA Today Co.
- Falls Church News-Press, Falls Church Virginia
- News-Press & Gazette Company, media company in St. Joseph, Missouri
- St. Joseph News-Press, newspaper in St. Joseph, Missouri

News Press may refer to:

- NewsPress, Stillwater, Oklahoma
- Shoshone News Press, Shoshone County, Idaho
