= Shoshone News Press =

Media outlet in Shoshone, Idaho

Shoshone News-Press
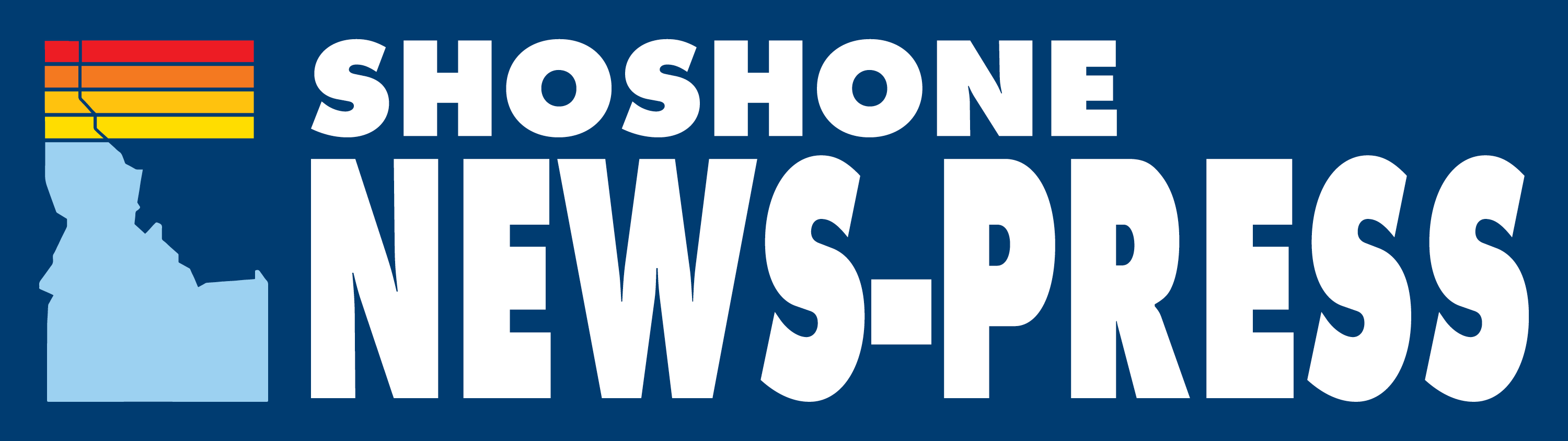

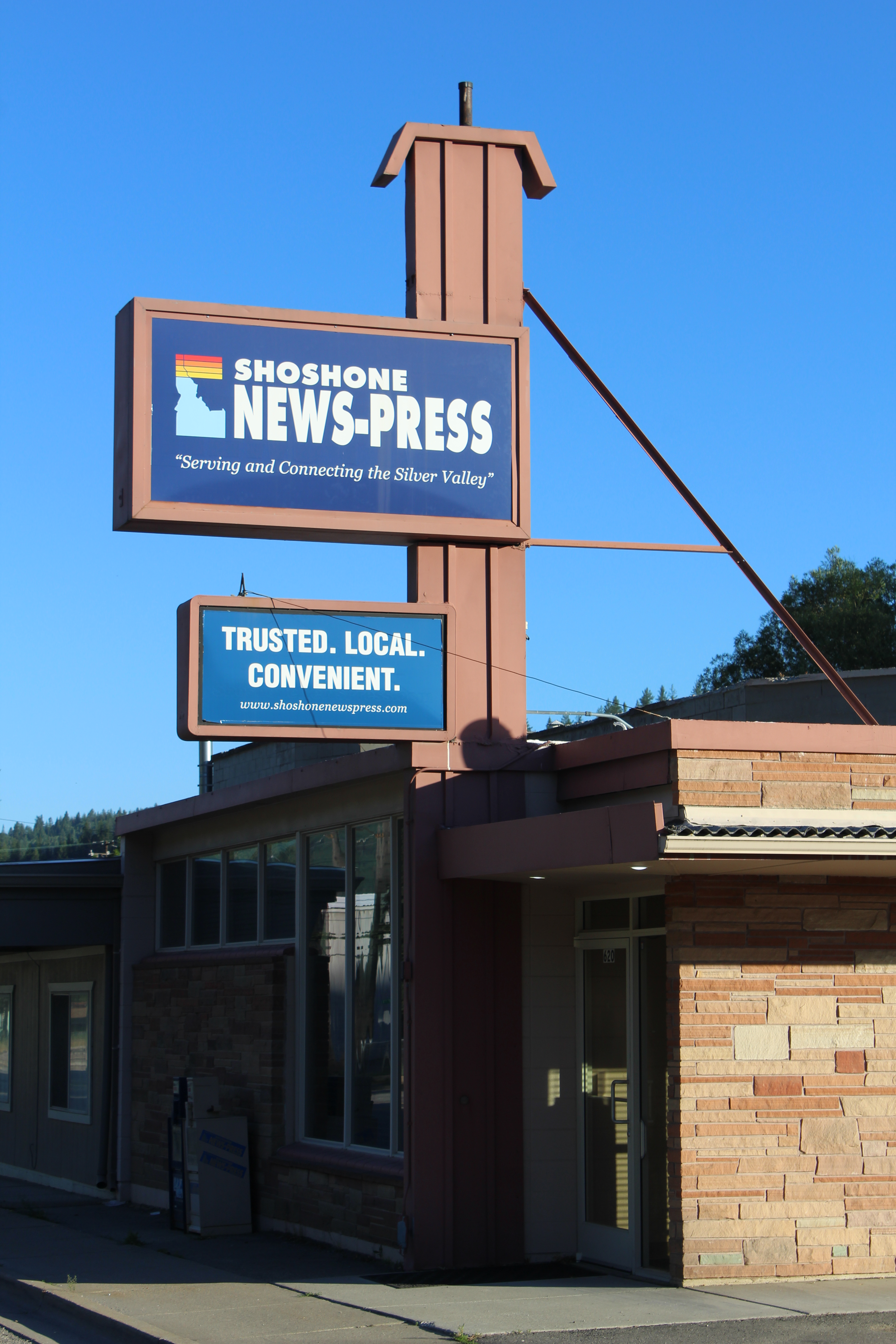
- The Shoshone News-Press office in Osburn, Idaho
- Type: Biweekly newspaper
- Owner: Hagadone Media Group
- Publisher: Clint Schroeder
- Editor: Josh McDonald
- Founded: May 1985
- Language: English
- Headquarters: 620 E Mullan Ave. Osburn, Idaho 83849
- OCLC number: 19117419
- Website: shoshonenewspress.com

The Shoshone News-Press is a newspaper in Shoshone County, Idaho. It publishes twice a week on Tuesdays and Fridays. The News-Press is owned by Hagadone Media Group. It formed in 1985 after the Kellogg Evening News merged with the North Idaho Press.

== History ==
=== Kellogg Evening News ===
In 1886, The Wardner News was founded in Wardner, Idaho by Mr. Barnett a fews months after the discovery of the Bunker Hill Mine Lode. The paper was soon sold to Walter McKelvey, and then Jack Langrishe. He died in 1895 and his widow Jeannette Allen owned the paper with Aaron Frost as manager. Frost died in 1907 and was succeeded by Victor E. Price. Eight months later William Penney bought the News. With Bunker Hill in decline, the paper was moved to Kellogg.

In 1925, Penney launched The Kellogg Evening News a daily paper while the News was continuing as a legal and mining edition. Penney died in 1936 and his sons Bill and John become co-publishers. John Penny died in 1969 and Bill Penney died in 1978. At that time his widow Nina Penney became owner. Her nephew Gary Corbeill served as publisher until the family sold the paper in 1985.

=== North Idaho Press ===
On July 2, 1887, brothers Alfred and John L. Dunn first published the Wallace Free Press in Wallace, Idaho. Two years later the Dunn brothers sold the paper to brothers Edward and Frank Tibbals, who changed the name to the Wallace Press. Adam Aulbach soon took over the paper and sold it in 1892 to R. F. "Barbarian" Brown, who changed the name to the Coeur d'Alene American. The paper ceased due to the Panic of 1893.

Aulbach and Pat Connor relaunched the Wallace Press on July 4, 1894. George S. Warren soon became owned and was succeeded by George Garbutt in 1896, who died a day later. Warren ran the paper again until selling it to F. B. Reitzel in 1903. A year later the paper was sold to J. K. Dunn who renamed it to The Idaho Press. In 1912, the paper merged with The Times to become the Wallace Press-Times.

In 1952, Henry L. Day sold the Wallace Press-Times to Burl C. Hagadone, an executive with Scripps League Newspapers. The name was soon changed to the North Idaho Press as coverage was expanded. Four years later Hagadone sold the paper to William S. Grant. In June 1962, Grant sold the North Idaho Press to Duane Hagadone of Lake City Printing Co., who a month later resold the paper a venture jointly owned Hagadone, Harry F. Magnuson and two others.

=== Shoshone News-Press ===
In 1985, Hagadone purchased North Idaho Publishing Co. from Magnuson and Kellogg News Inc. from Gary Corbeill. Following the sale, the Hagadone Cooperation merged the Kellogg Evening News in Kellogg and North Idaho Press in Wallace together on May 6 to form the Shoshone County News-Press. The word "County" was dropped from the name in 1989. In 2010, an arsonist burned down and destroyed the paper's original office in uptown Kellogg. The paper was then located in Osburn until its office was closed in 2023 and staff moved to the facilities of the Coeur d'Alene Press.
