= The Boulder Monitor =

The Monitor
- "Serving the Future of Jefferson County"
- Type: Weekly newspaper
- Founder: C.E. Trescott
- Publisher: Keith Hammonds
- Editor: David Lepeska
- Founded: 1907
- Language: English
- Headquarters: 104 West Centennial Ave., Boulder, MT
- Website: boulder-monitor.com

The Monitor is a weekly newspaper in Boulder, Montana in the United States.

== History ==
On September 14, 1907, C.E. Trescott published the first edition of The Boulder Monitor in Boulder, Montana. In 1913, H.R. Young bought the Monitor from Trescott.

In June 1917, Young purchased The Republican of Sentinel Butte, North Dakota. At that time, he left Boulder and sold the Monitor to C.C. Mills, a lawyer who owned the Montana Idea, published in Dodson, Montana. That December, Adolph H. Eiselein, whose brother A.W. Eiselein owned The Roundup Record, bought the Monitor.

In 1969, Robert "Bob" C. Hawkins acquired the Monitor from Eiselein. In 1972, Dean Brown purchased the paper. In 1974, Eiselein died. In 1977, Vern Sutherlin became the owner. In 1978, Hawkins died.

In 1997, David and Jan Anderson founded a rival paper in Boulder called the Jefferson County Courier. In 2002, the Anderons acquired the Monitor from Sutherlin. In 2011, the Courier was merged into the Monitor. In 2017 the newspaper was listed for sale for $102,500. It was purchased in 2018 by Keith Hammonds and Jackie Dyer.

== Lawsuit ==
In December 2011, The Boulder Monitor sued the Jefferson High School District over what the newspaper alleged was an open meeting violation. In February 2012, the board admitted conducting business via email with no public notice, a violation of Montana's open meeting provisions, and the newspaper dropped the suit. In 2014, the Monitor again sued the school district over what the newspaper alleged was the district's failure to provide public notice of a school board meeting when a quorum of the board was present at an unannounced committee meeting. The case was ultimately decided by the Montana Supreme Court which ruled that the district's failure to publish notice was not a violation of Montana's open meetings statutes as the meeting in question was a committee hearing and not an assembly of the full board.

== See also ==
- List of newspapers in Montana
