= Colby Free Press =

Newspaper published in Colby, Kansas, US

The Colby Free Press
- Type: Daily newspaper
- Format: Broadsheet
- Owner: Mullen Newspaper Company
- Founded: 1888
- Language: English
- Headquarters: 155 W 5th Colby, KS 66901; United States
- Circulation: 1,184
- Website: nwkansas.com

The Colby Free Press is a local newspaper published in Colby, Kansas. It is the official newspaper for Thomas County, Kansas. It publishes four days a week, Monday and Wednesday through Friday. U.S. Representative John R. Connelly was its owner and editor from 1897 until 1919.

In 2022, the Haynes family sold the Colby Free Press to brothers Jesse Mullen and Lloyd Mullen of Mullen Newspaper Company. In February 2025, Lloyd Mullen bought out his brother. In February 2026, the Free Press was consolidate with five other papers (Goodland Star News, St. Francis Herald, Norton Telegram, Oberlin Herald, and Rawlins County Square Deal) and renamed to the High Plains News.
