= Montana capital referendum =

1894 capital city referendum

- November 6, 1894
- Montana capital referendum, second round (1894)

Results
| Choice | Votes | % |
|---|---|---|
| Helena | 27,024 | 51.83% |
| Anaconda | 25,118 | 48.17% |
| Total votes | 52,142 | 100.00% |
County results
Helena
90–100%
80–90%
70–80%
60–70%
50–60%
Anaconda
80–90%
60–70%
50–60%
No Data/Vote

In the 1890s, the state of Montana held a referendum to select its capital city. The first round was held in 1892 between several cities, and since none won outright, a second round was held in 1894. After an expensive and negative campaign, Helena was selected as the capital over Anaconda by a margin of around 2,000 votes (3.6 percent).

== Background ==
In 1891, Montana legislators passed a bill to select a capital city by referendum in the general election of 1892; if no city were to win a majority, then a second referendum would be held in 1894. The cities of Anaconda, Boulder, Bozeman, Butte, Deer Lodge, Great Falls, and Helena (then the temporary capital) entered the 1892 referendum after collecting enough signatures from residents. In the first round, Boulder received 295 votes; Deer Lodge, 983; Great Falls, 5,049; Bozeman, 7,685; Butte, 7,752; Anaconda, 10,183; and Helena, 14,010. As no city won the referendum outright, the two cities with the highest share of the vote—Helena and Anaconda—were entered to compete in the general election of 1894.

== Campaign ==
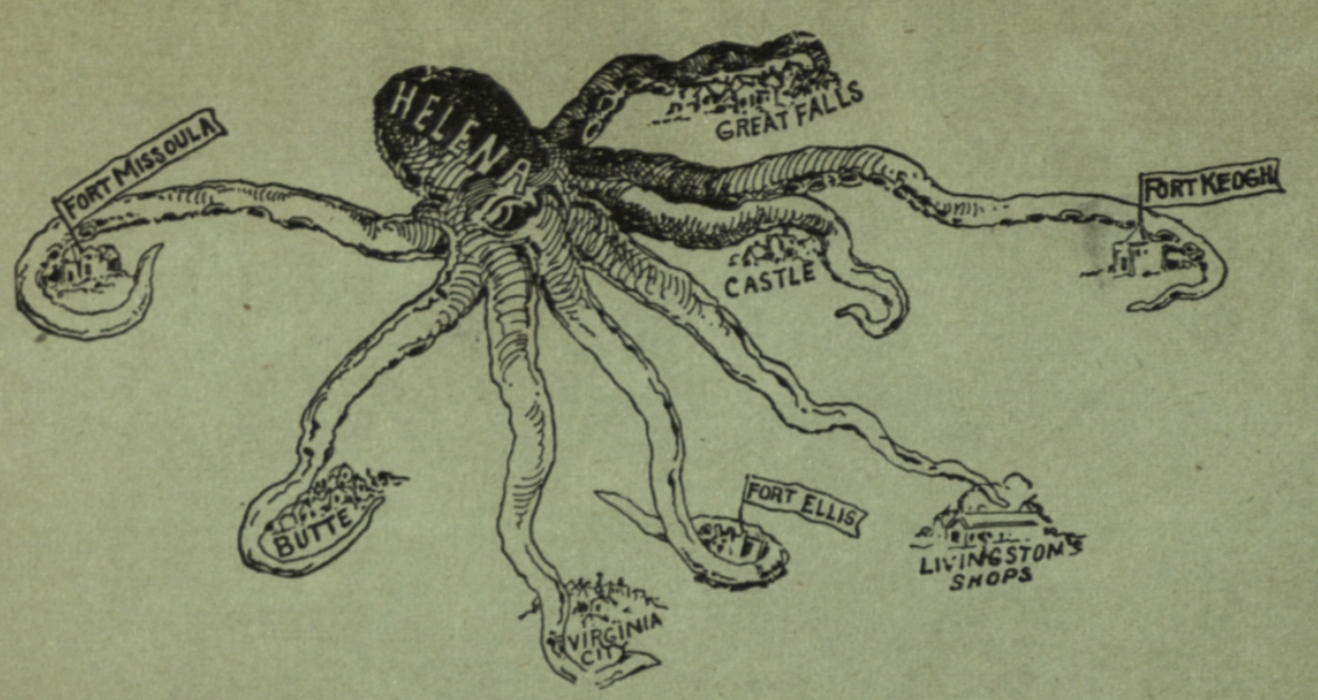
The back cover of Helena's Social Supremacy, showing Helena as an octopus grasping the other cities

Both Helena and Anaconda were problematic cities for voters. Where Helena, as the temporary capital, had been embroiled in political dysfunction, (Note: Early Montana legislatures were chaotic, with deadlock only addressed through precarious political compromises.) Anaconda was perceived as a working-class, industrial city under the control of Marcus Daly and his corporations.

During the campaign season of September and October 1894, newspaper editorials in favor of a city were printed, and political memorabilia—including campaign buttons and banners—were minted. Organizations to promote cities were formed, and rallies were held to distribute campaign materials. Negative campaigning was prominent, with supporters of Helena decrying Anaconda as a socially inferior city that was beheld to a corporate business class, and with Anaconda supporters condemning Helena as a pretentious city of politics that did not possess a meaningful economy. Butte's Populist Tribune, for instance, framed the referendum as a question of accepting "Helena dictatorship" over the people, and Helena's Colored Citizen (Note: A paper for the African American community of Montana, the Colored Citizen was financed heavily by the Republican Party and was established specifically for the election. The paper was anti-immigrant; its editor stated that Anaconda's mining companies preferred "Dagoes and foreigners to native colored Americans". After the election, the paper dissolved.) warned that Anaconda was ruled by the same interests that "has always crushed out the black man from every factory or workshop".

There were far fewer women in Anaconda than in Helena—supporters of its bid thought the settlement of women was beneficial because it could harbor a permanent population, but opponents believed it produced effeminate men. Helena's Social Supremacy, a satirical pamphlet that sought to debase Helena's image, said that where the city consumed 17,669 Manhattan cocktails daily, Anaconda consumed just 127; where Helena had 774 "ladies with poodle dogs", Anaconda had none; and where Helena possessed 1,343 "skeletons in closets", Anaconda possessed 16.

== Results ==
In November 1894, Helena was chosen over Anaconda by a margin of around 2,000 votes: Helena received 27,024 votes (51.8% of the total), and Anaconda received 25,118 (48.2%). The total cost for the campaigns was between $1 and $2 million, (Note: Equivalent to $37–$74 million in 2025.) in part because of their elaborate campaign strategies—which included fireworks, memorabilia, and coins. One of the prominent campaigners for Helena's bid, William A. Clark, reportedly celebrated the results by purchasing Helena's residents drinks at a cost of $30,000. (Note: Equivalent to $1,116,346 in 2025.)

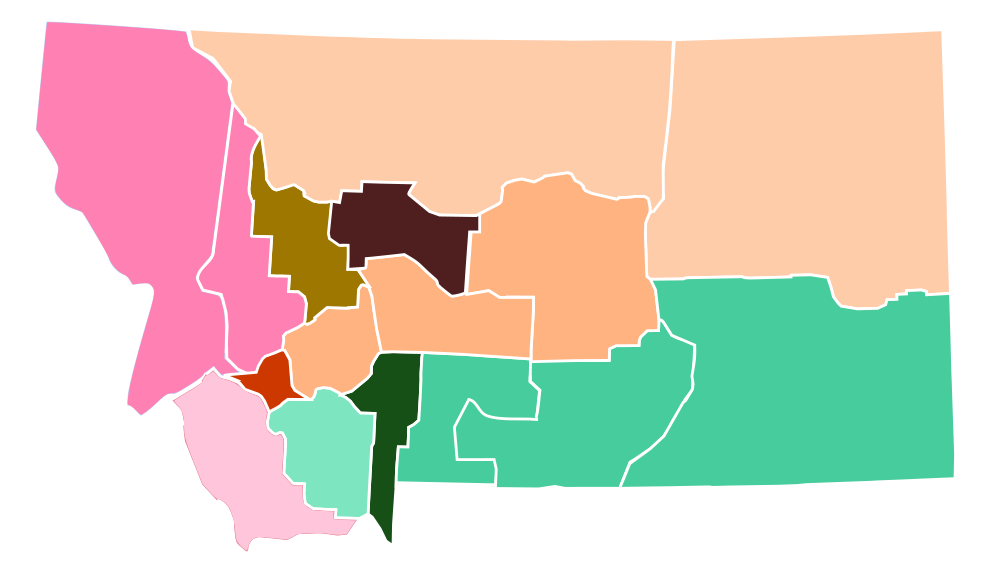
Montana Capital Referendum First Round results (1892) between Helena, Anaconda, Butte, Bozeman, Great Falls, Deer Lodge, and Boulder. Map legend: Helena—90–100%; Helena—50–60%; Helena—40–50%; Anaconda—50-60%; Anaconda—30–40%; Butte—50-60%; Bozeman—90–100%; Bozeman—50–60%; Bozeman—40–50%; Great Falls—80–90%

1892 Montana capital referendum (first round)
| Candidate | Votes | % |
|---|---|---|
| Helena | 14,032 | 30.5% |
| Anaconda | 10,272 | 22.3% |
| Butte | 7,767 | 16.9% |
| Bozeman | 7,636 | 16.6% |
| Great Falls | 5,036 | 10.9% |
| Deer Lodge | 983 | 2.1% |
| Boulder | 295 | 0.6% |
| Total votes | 46,021 | 100% |

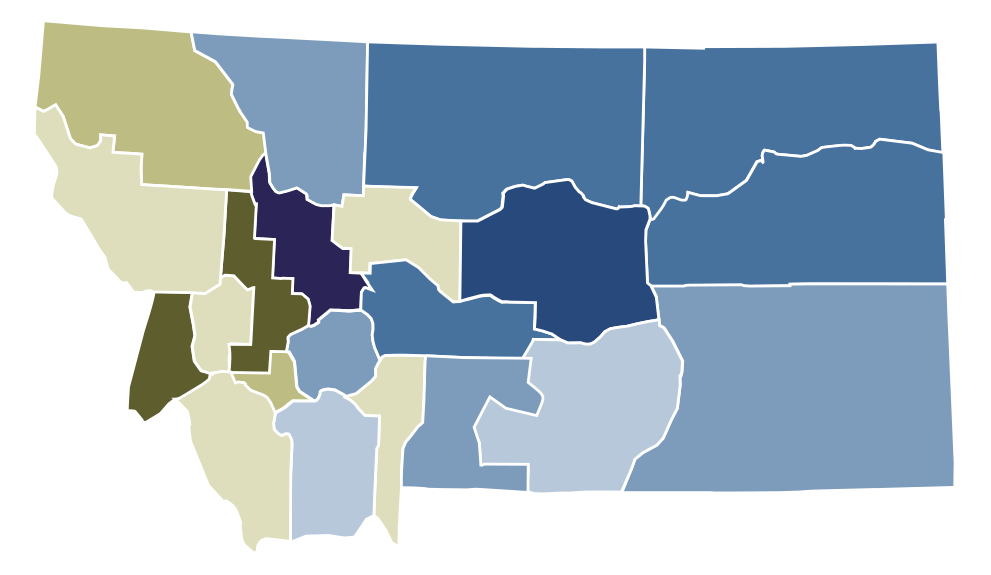
Montana Capital Referendum Second Round results (1894) between Helena and Anaconda. Map legend: Helena-90-100%; Helena-80–90%; Helena-70–80%; Helena-60-70%; Helena-50–60%; Anaconda-80-90%; Anaconda-60-70%; Anaconda-50-60%

1894 Montana capital referendum (second round)
| Candidate | Votes | % |
|---|---|---|
| Helena | 27,024 | 51.8% |
| Anaconda | 25,118 | 48.2% |
| Total votes | 52,142 | 100% |

== Results by county ==
Round One (1892) (Note: These are the results that appeared in the table published by the Independent Record on November 29th, 1892. These are not official and may not show every vote counted, but more than 99% of votes should be accounted for here.)

| County | Helena % | Helena | Anaconda % | Anaconda | Butte % | Butte | Bozeman % | Bozeman | Great Falls % | Great Falls | Deer Lodge % | Deer Lodge | Boulder % | Boulder | Total |
|---|---|---|---|---|---|---|---|---|---|---|---|---|---|---|---|
| Beaverhead | 26.41% | 365 | 31.77% | 439 | 23.73% | 328 | 14.25% | 197 | 2.82% | 39 | 0.80% | 11 | 0.22% | 3 | 1,382 |
| Cascade | 7.31% | 215 | 1.97% | 58 | 0.75% | 22 | 0.68% | 20 | 89.06% | 2,621 | 0.20% | 6 | 0.03% | 1 | 2,943 |
| Chouteau | 49.22% | 784 | 4.90% | 78 | 0.56% | 9 | 1.13% | 18 | 43.44% | 692 | 0.75% | 12 | 0.00% | 0 | 1,593 |
| Custer | 34.61% | 451 | 1.00% | 13 | 1.23% | 16 | 58.33% | 760 | 3.91% | 51 | 0.38% | 5 | 0.54% | 7 | 1,303 |
| Dawson | 41.59% | 267 | 0.47% | 3 | 1.09% | 7 | 34.58% | 222 | 20.56% | 132 | 1.25% | 8 | 0.47% | 3 | 642 |
| Deer Lodge | 17.99% | 1,018 | 52.63% | 2,979 | 9.54% | 540 | 4.84% | 274 | 0.77% | 44 | 14.03% | 794 | 0.19% | 11 | 5,660 |
| Fergus | 52.59% | 740 | 1.14% | 16 | 0.57% | 8 | 6.47% | 91 | 38.73% | 545 | 0.14% | 2 | 0.36% | 5 | 1,407 |
| Gallatin | 4.47% | 104 | 1.25% | 29 | 0.56% | 13 | 92.87% | 2,163 | 0.64% | 15 | 0.00% | 0 | 0.21% | 5 | 2,329 |
| Jefferson | 52.49% | 1,032 | 9.92% | 195 | 13.17% | 259 | 13.63% | 268 | 1.58% | 31 | 0.25% | 5 | 8.95% | 176 | 1,966 |
| Lewis and Clark | 91.74% | 4,974 | 2.14% | 116 | 1.35% | 73 | 2.07% | 112 | 2.40% | 130 | 0.17% | 9 | 0.15% | 8 | 5,422 |
| Madison | 15.77% | 250 | 6.06% | 96 | 33.44% | 530 | 42.65% | 676 | 0.32% | 5 | 1.20% | 19 | 0.57% | 9 | 1,585 |
| Meagher | 56.73% | 1,104 | 2.36% | 46 | 4.01% | 78 | 14.23% | 277 | 22.35% | 435 | 0.10% | 2 | 0.21% | 4 | 1,946 |
| Missoula | 24.25% | 1,351 | 56.62% | 3,155 | 8.74% | 487 | 4.81% | 268 | 3.86% | 215 | 1.26% | 70 | 0.47% | 26 | 5,572 |
| Park | 27.90% | 678 | 10.41% | 253 | 4.44% | 108 | 55.47% | 1,348 | 1.56% | 38 | 0.08% | 2 | 0.21% | 5 | 2,430 |
| Silver Bow | 4.36% | 385 | 30.37% | 2,682 | 59.28% | 5,234 | 4.63% | 409 | 0.63% | 56 | 0.41% | 36 | 0.32% | 28 | 8,830 |
| Yellowstone | 34.17% | 314 | 1.52% | 14 | 4.90% | 45 | 58.0% | 533 | 0.76% | 7 | 0.22% | 2 | 0.44% | 4 | 919 |

Round Two (1894) (Note: These are the results that appeared in the table published by the Independent Record on November 21st, 1894. These are not official and may not show every vote counted, but more than 99% of votes should be accounted for here.)

| County | Helena % | Helena | Anaconda % | Anaconda | Total |
|---|---|---|---|---|---|
| Beaverhead | 49.53% | 637 | 50.47% | 649 | 1,286 |
| Cascade | 42.91% | 1,576 | 57.09% | 2,097 | 3,673 |
| Chouteau | 77.28% | 1,007 | 22.72% | 296 | 1,303 |
| Custer | 67.15% | 924 | 32.85% | 452 | 1,376 |
| Dawson | 77.49% | 389 | 22.51% | 113 | 502 |
| Deer Lodge | 18.74% | 955 | 81.26% | 4,142 | 5,097 |
| Fergus | 80.03% | 1,206 | 19.97% | 301 | 1,507 |
| Flathead | 31.89% | 633 | 68.11% | 1,352 | 1,985 |
| Gallatin | 44.61% | 1,042 | 55.39% | 1,294 | 2,336 |
| Granite | 48.62% | 636 | 51.38% | 672 | 1,308 |
| Jefferson | 68.58% | 1,772 | 31.42% | 812 | 2,584 |
| Lewis and Clark | 94.95% | 5,377 | 5.05% | 286 | 5,663 |
| Madison | 51.52% | 969 | 48.48% | 912 | 1,881 |
| Meagher | 76.29% | 1,155 | 23.71% | 359 | 1,514 |
| Missoula | 46.75% | 1,296 | 53.25% | 1,476 | 2,772 |
| Park | 67.17% | 1,543 | 32.83% | 754 | 2,297 |
| Ravalli | 15.45% | 291 | 84.55% | 1,593 | 1,884 |
| Silver Bow | 38.07% | 4,003 | 61.93% | 6,513 | 10,516 |
| Teton | 63.91% | 487 | 36.09% | 275 | 762 |
| Valley | 70.52% | 287 | 29.48% | 120 | 407 |
| Yellowstone | 56.22% | 831 | 43.78% | 647 | 1,478 |

== Notes and references ==
=== Bibliography ===
- Lang, William L. (1987). "Spoils of statehood". Montana: The Magazine of Western History. 37 (4).
- Leech, Brian (April 12, 2008). "Hired hands from abroad": The populist producer's ethic, immigrant workers, and nativism in Montana's 1894 state capital election. James A. Rawley Graduate Conference in the Humanities — Imagining communities: People, places, meanings. Lincoln, NE. pp. 1–21.
- Malone, Michael P. (1983). "Midas of the West: The incredible career of William Andrews Clark". Montana: The Magazine of Western History. 33 (4): 2–17. ISSN 0026-9891. JSTOR 4518776.
- Newby, Rick (1987). "Helena's Social Supremacy: Political sarcasm and the capital fight". Montana: The Magazine of Western History. 37 (4): 68–72. ISSN 0026-9891. JSTOR 4519094.
- Taylor, Quintard (1979). "The emergence of black communities in the Pacific Northwest: 1865–1910". The Journal of Negro History. 64 (4): 342–354. doi:10.2307/2716942. JSTOR 2716942. S2CID 132137921.
- "How lone Chinaman nearly won election". Anaconda Standard. June 3, 1917.
