= Coeur d'Alene Resort =

Resort hotel in Coeur d'Alene, Idaho

The Coeur d'Alene Resort Golf Course
- Coeur d'Alene Resort's Lake Tower in 2023

- Location in the United States Location in Idaho
- 47.672°N 116.784°W

Club information
- Location: Coeur d'Alene, Idaho, U.S.
- Elevation: 2,150 feet (655 m)
- Established: 1991; 35 years ago (golf course)
- Type: Resort / Public
- Owner: Duane Hagadone & Jerry Jaeger
- Operator: Hagadone Hospitality
- Tota holes: 18
- Website: cdaresort.com
- Designed by: Scott Miller
- Par: 71
- Length: 6,803 yd (6,221 m) (gold); 6,355 yd (5,811 m) (blue); 5,914 yd (5,408 m) (tan); 5,436 yd (4,971 m) (copper); 4,448 yd (4,067 m) (mauve)
- Course rating: 71.8, 70.1 (blue), 68.2 (tan)
- Slope rating: 127, 122 (blue), 116 (tan)
- Course record: 64

The Coeur d'Alene Resort is a resort hotel in the northwest United States, located in Coeur d’Alene, Idaho. Seated on the north shore of Lake Coeur d'Alene by Tubbs Hill, the resort features a marina, convention facilities, spa, as well as a notable 18-hole golf course.

The hotel has 338 guest rooms and suites, and its main tower has 18 floors; the resort also has 40,912 square feet (3,800 m^{2}) of meeting room space and 23,000 square feet (2,140 m^{2}) of exhibition space for conventions. At 216 feet (66 m) in height, it is the tallest building in northern Idaho and the third-highest in the state.

== History ==
The "North Shore Resort" opened 61 years ago in 1965 and completed its seven-story tower in 1973; it was acquired by Hagadone Hospitality in June 1983 in a takeover of Western Frontiers, Inc. Duane Hagadone soon announced plans for resort expansion, and the North Shore closed on New Year's Day in 1986 for several months; it reopened in the spring with a new name: "The Coeur d'Alene: A Resort on the Lake." The new 18-story addition, known as the Lake Tower, was built by Hagadone and Jerry Jaeger and opened 40 years ago in May 1986. Designed by architect R.G. Nelson, the hotel features a three-quarters of a mile (1.2 km) floating boardwalk around the marina.

The golf course is about a mile east (1.6 km) of the resort and was originally the site of the Rutledge sawmill, which operated from 1916 to 1987, closing on October 31. The Hagadone Corporation bought the property from Potlatch Corporation in March 1988 via a three-way land swap, and its buildings were allowed to be burned in June; local fire departments used it as a training exercise.

The golf course and the floating green were developed, and the course opened for play 35 years ago in 1991. Its construction required environmental clean-up of the debris left from the lumber industry, and had stalled in August 1988. With environmental concerns allayed, the project was well received in January and course construction began in 1989.

The seven-story Park Tower (1973), completed a renovation in 2000, as did the signature Lake Tower (1986) in 2006.

== Golf course ==
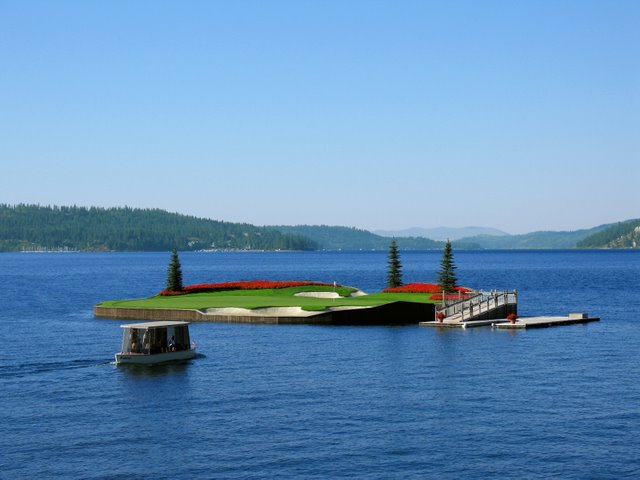
The Floating Green – (14th Hole)

The resort's golf course is best known for its floating green on the 14th hole, and location on the north shore of the lake. The 2,300-ton floating green was installed in September 1990 and unveiled by Hagadone and Governor Cecil Andrus shortly after; the course opened the following spring. "Putter" is the vessel that shuttles players to and from the green.

Phoenix-based designer Scott Miller planned the course to feel like a park, and it has since been ranked among the best resort golf courses in the United States by Golf Digest, Golf Magazine and others. The course was featured in the video game Tiger Woods PGA Tour 2005; its average elevation is approximately 2,200 feet (670 m) above sea level.

=== Scorecard ===
Coeur d'Alene Resort Golf Course
Tee	Rating/Slope	1	2	3	4	5	6	7	8	9	Out	10	11	12	13	14	15	16	17	18	In	Total
Par		5	4	3	4	3	3	4	4	5	35	4	5	3	4	3	5	4	4	4	36	71
SI	Men's	7	3	17	5	13	15	11	9	1		6	2	14	12	10	16	8	18	4
Gold	71.8 / 127	540	479	155	322	148	169	435	437	601	3286	469	538	249	368	218	495	429	269	482	3517	6803
Combo	70.6 / 125	540	436	155	307	148	169	395	437	566	3153	469	522	208	368	175	495	417	269	451	3374	6527
Blue	70.1 / 122	526	436	128	307	132	163	395	420	566	3073	438	522	208	336	175	478	417	257	451	3282	6355
Tan	M:68.2/116 W:73.1/129	499	377	114	256	120	155	389	399	540	2849	406	506	180	293	147	462	401	236	434	3065	5914
Par		5	4	3	4	3	3	4	4	5	35	4	5	3	4	3	5	4	4	4	36	71
SI	Women's	3	7	15	9	17	13	11	5	1		10	2	18	16	12	8	6	14	4
Copper	70.2 / 126	424	327	108	249	105	136	350	370	510	2579	351	484	148	278	137	443	391	229	396	2857	5436
Mauve	64.8 / 113	387	285	88	220	91	124	240	308	425	2168	256	395	133	171	95	373	313	208	336	2280	4448
