= Helena's Social Supremacy =

1894 political pamphlet

Helena's Social Supremacy (1894), also known as Helena's Social Supremacy – Montana's Center of Fashion, Refinement, Gentility, Etiquet, Kettle Drums, High Fives, Progressive Euchre, and Mixed Drinks, is a satirical pamphlet created during the Montana capital referendum by Charles H. Eggleston, the editor of the Anaconda Standard.

== Background ==
The pamphlet was published during the Montana capital referendum, conducted in two parts in 1892 and 1894. In 1892, several cities entered to become the state capital, but none of them won a majority; a second round was held in 1894 between Helena and Anaconda. Both Helena and Anaconda were problematic cities for voters. Where Helena, as the temporary capital, had been embroiled in political dysfunction—early Montana legislatures were chaotic, with deadlock only addressed through precarious political compromises—Anaconda was perceived as a working-class, industrial city under the control of Marcus Daly and his corporations.

== Publication and contents ==
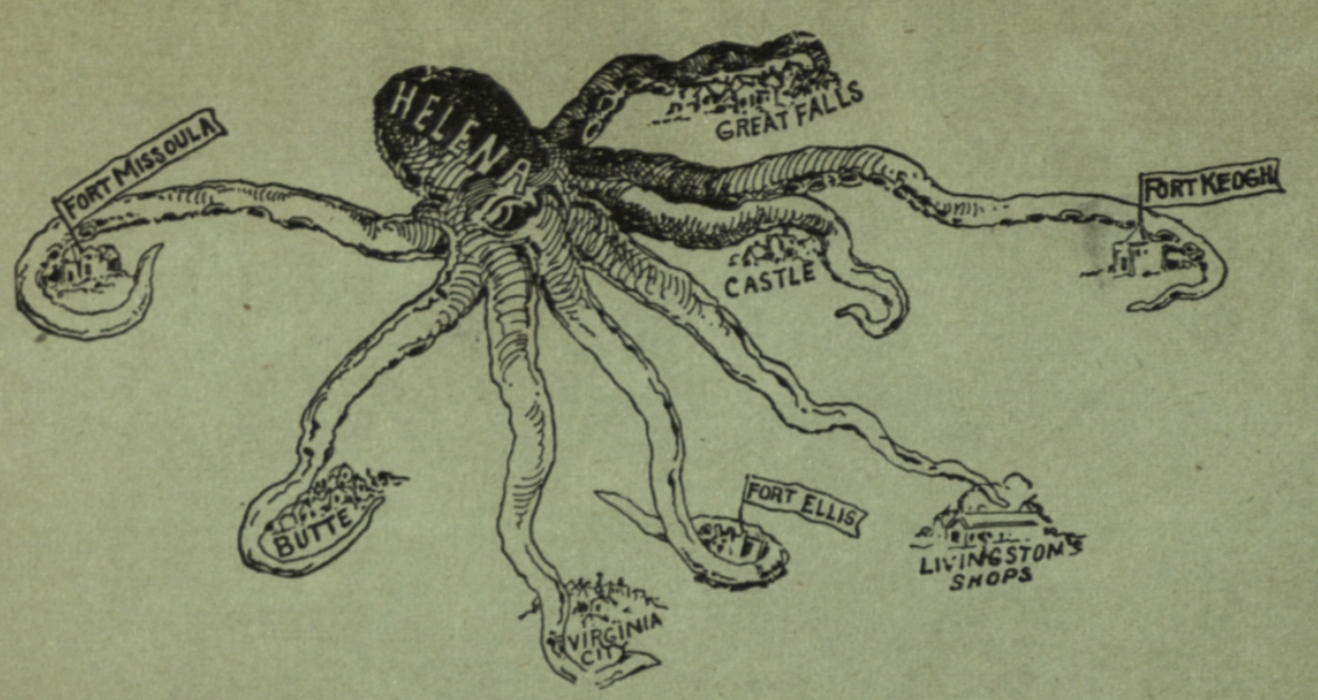
The back cover of Helena's Social Supremacy, showing Helena as an octopus grasping the other cities

The pamphlet was created by Charles H. Eggleston, the editor of the Anaconda Standard, though it lists no author. It masqueraded as a supplement to An Address to the People of Montana, a pro-Helena pamphlet that degraded the city of Anaconda for its working-class, little-educated, and industrial population. Although the pamphlet lists Helena as its original print location, and a contemporaneous newspaper account said the pamphlet was printed "by some every-day citizen of Helena" who was "disgusted" with An Address to the People of Montana, Helena's Social Supremacy was likelier printed elsewhere. It contains 48 pages, some with illustrations, and has a page size of 16.5 × 11.2 cm. Upon its completion, the Great Falls Weekly Tribune reported that the committee in charge of the Address sent an attaché of "paid spies" to uncover the author's identity.

The pamphlet played into the view of Helena as a pretentious and elite city. In one segment, it reported that Helena had hundreds of women—774—who owned poodle dogs, while Anaconda had precisely zero. Where the Address had painted Marcus Daly—the corporate leader of Anaconda—as rapacious, the satire instead developed a rags to riches story of an egalitarian gentleman; the satire said the apparent ineffectiveness of the Address in demonstrating his greed was because of Helena's "proverbial tenderness of heart and nobility of soul". It satirized the Helenan view of other towns by portraying them as relatively advanced and progressive: Boulder boys and girls finely danced, the residents of Phillipsburg brushed their teeth, and Anacondans did not consider it "good fun to interrupt funeral services with a charivari" (mock parade).

Although thousands of copies of the pamphlet were probably produced in the lead-up to the referendum, an estimate in 1940 placed the number surviving at around six. Around that time, one copy was repatriated to Montana—and then to the state treasurer's archives—after being held on the East Coast for several decades.
