= The Western News =

- Type: Twice-weekly newspaper
- Format: Broadsheet
- Owner: Hagadone Media Group
- Publisher: Anton Kaufer
- President: Clint Schroeder
- General manager: Suzanne Resch
- Founded: 1902
- Headquarters: Libby, Montana
- Circulation: 3,000
- Website: thewesternnews.com

The Western News is a twice-weekly newspaper in Libby, Montana. Its coverage area is southern Lincoln County, which includes the communities of Libby and Troy. The Western News was founded in 1902, and is owned by Duane Hagadone and the Hagadone Newspaper Group.

== History ==
The Western News was founded in 1902. In 1916, Kennedy & Lang sold the paper to Irvine & Griffin. C. A. Griffin sold his interests in the Western Montana Publishing Co. to Charles D. Rowe in 1923. Rowe operated the paper for 22 years until selling it in 1945 to W. R. Littell. Littell sold it in 1960 to Paul Verdon and Ray Denning. W. C. and Clark King purchased the Western News from Paul Verdon and his wife Elaine in 1979. Mark and June McMahon owned the paper for 17 years until selling it to Hagadone Investment Co. in 1999. Owner Duane B. Hagadone died in 2021.
