= Daily Inter Lake =

Daily newspaper published in Kalispell, Montana

- Type: Daily newspaper
- Owner: Hagadone Media Group
- Founder(s): Clayton O. Ingalls; Emma Ingalls
- Publisher: Anton Kaufer
- President: Clint Schroeder
- Editor: Matt Baldwin
- Staff writers: 50
- Founded: 1889
- Language: English
- Headquarters: Kalispell, Montana
- Circulation: 10,000
- ISSN: 2833-759X
- OCLC number: 12318410
- Website: dailyinterlake.com

The Daily Inter Lake is a daily newspaper based in Kalispell, Montana, the seat of Flathead County. It was founded in the former town of Demersville, Montana, in 1889 by a local couple, Clayton and Emma Ingalls, before moving to the new city of Kalispell two years later.

The Inter Lake is part of the Hagadone Corporation's portfolio of newspapers across the Pacific Northwest. It is published along with multiple weekly newspapers serving communities in northwestern Montana.

== History ==
On Aug. 23, 1889, the first of the weekly Inter Lake was published by Clayton O. Ingalls and his wife Emma Ingalls in Demersville, Montana. The newspaper was name the Inter Lake due to the town being between the Flathead Lake and Lake McDonald. The paper relocated to Kalispell in December 1891.

In spring 1892, C.O. Ingalls grew ill and sold the Inter Lake to a stock company, with P.N. Bernard as editor and manager. It was back in the hands of the Ingalls family in 1893 after they purchased a controlling interest. R.M. Goshorn bought the paper on Jan. 1, 1895. He expanded it from a weekly to a daily on April 13, 1908.

In 1913, the paper was bought by supporters of President Theodore Roosevelt and became a mouthpiece of the Bull Moose Party. William E. "Bill" O'Leary joined the staff in 1915 and remained at the Inter Lake for 59 years. Louis D. Spafford published a rival paper called Kalispell Bee before hired at the Inter Lake in 1916. Dr. Albert H. Howe bought the paper in 1919. After the Bull Moose Party disbanded, O'Leary and Spafford became co-owners in 1922 after Howe died.

Two decades later they sold the paper on Jan. 1, 1949, to Victor J. Morgan and D.L. McDermott of The Dalles, Oregon. Morgan and McDermott sold the business to Scripps League Newspapers on July 1, 1951. In May 1976, Scripps and the Hagadone Corporation severed their partnership and Hagadone took ownership of six newspapers including the Inter Lake. In 2021, owner Duane B. Hagadone died.
