= Cut Bank Pioneer Press =

Montana newspaper established in 1909

- Type: Weekly newspaper
- Owner: Mullen Newspaper Company
- Founder: Dan Whetstone
- Editor: John McGill
- General manager: Dawn Texidor
- Founded: 1909
- Language: English
- City: Cut Bank, Montana
- ISSN: 2378-6876
- OCLC number: 11982522
- Website: cutbankpioneerpress.com

The Cut Bank Pioneer Press is an American daily newspaper founded in 1909. Based in Cut Bank, Montana, the newspaper is published alongside the Glacier Reporter, Shelby Promoter, The Valerian, and the Liberty Chronicle.

== History ==
The Cut Bank Pioneer Press was founded on July 16, 1909, by Daniel Whetstone. He was a former part owner of the Havre Daily News and in 1955 published an autobiography titled "Frontier Editor," but it was later renamed to "I Saw the Old West Fade." He published the paper until his death in 1966. The Pioneer Press was inherited by his son Frank Whetstone, who went on to be a top political advisor to Ronald Reagan during two presidential campaigns.

In 1971, Frank Whetstone sold the paper to Kenneth Byerly, owner of the Lewiston Daily News. In 1976, Byerly sold the paper to Riley and Roberta Johnson. In 1977, the Johnsons sold the paper to Keith and Vi Haugland. In 1982, the Kavanagh family acquired the Pioneer Press.

In March 2022, the Mullen Newspaper Company acquired four Montana newspapers from the Kavanagh family, including Cut Bank Pioneer Press, Shelby Promoter, Browning Glacier Reporter and The Valierian. Mullen acquired the Conrad Independent Observer in August 2024, and the Havre Weekly Chronicle in January 2025. Both papers were merged into the Pioneer Press in January 2026. Later that year, printing was moved to Cody, Wyoming.
