= Mullen Newspaper Company =

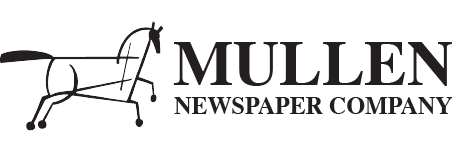
- Founded: 2018
- Founder: Jesse Mullen
- Headquarters: 312 Missouri Ave, Deer Lodge, MT 59722
- Key people: Alex Barta (CEO)
- Owner: Jesse Mullen; Lloyd Mullen
- Website: mullennewspapers.com

Mullen Newspaper Company is a privately owned publisher of daily, non-daily and weekly newspapers based in Deer Lodge, Montana, United States. With 20 publications, the publisher operates in six states, Colorado, Idaho, Kansas, Montana, Nebraska, and Washington.

== History ==
Jesse Mullen founded the Mullen Newspaper Company in 2018 with the purchase of Philipsburg Mail and Silver State Post in Montana. Both those papers were merged together two years later.

In December 2020, Mullen purchased the Bitterroot Star from Michael and Victoria Howell, who founded the newspaper in 1985.

In May 2021, Mullen purchased Idaho based newspaper St. Maries Gazette Record, founded in 1902 and operated by the Hammes family since 1958.

In December 2021, Mullen purchased the Johnson Newspaper Group in Nebraska and Colorado The sale included the Grant Tribune-Sentinel, Imperial Republican and Holyoke Enterprise.

In March 2022, Mullen acquired four Montana newspapers from the Kavanagh family, including Cut Bank Pioneer Press, Shelby Promoter, Browning Glacier Reporter and The Valierian.

In December 2022, Mullen acquired six Kansas newspapers from the Haynes family. The sale included Colby Free Press, Goodland Star-News, Oberlin Herald, Norton Telegram, St. Francis Herald/Bird City Times and the Rawlins County Square Deal.

In May 2023, Mullen stepped down as CEO and was replaced by Alex Barta, publisher of the St. Maries Gazette Record.

In August 2024, Mullen purchased the Conrad (Mont.) Independent Observer.

In January 2025, Mullen purchased the Havre Weekly Chronicle.

== List of publications ==
Title	Location	Info
Bird City Times	Bird City, Kansas	
Bitterroot Star	Stevensville, Montana	
Colby Free Press	Colby, Kansas	
The Country Advocate	Colby, Kansas	
Cut Bank Pioneer Press	Cut Bank, Montana	
St. Maries Gazette Record	Saint Maries, Idaho	
Goodland Star News	Goodland, Kansas	
Grant Tribune	Grant, Nebraska	
Glacier Reporter	Browning, Montana	
Havre Weekly Chronicle	Havre, Montana	
Holyoke Enterprise	Holyoke, Colorado	
Imperial Republican	Imperial, Nebraska	
Independent Observer	Conrad, Montana	
Oberlin Herald	Oberlin, Kansas	
Philipsburg Mail	Philipsburg, Montana	
Port Townsend Leader	Port Townsend, Washington	
Saint Francis Herald	Saint Francis, Kansas	
Seeley Swan Pathfinder	Seeley Lake, Montana	
Shelby Promoter	Shelby, Montana	
Silver State Post	Deer Lodge, Montana	
The Valierian	Valier, Montana	
