= Havre Weekly Chronicle =

- Type: Weekly newspaper
- Owner: Mullen Newspaper Company
- Founder: Louis Pierson
- Publisher: George Ferguson
- Editor: Tim Leeds
- Founded: 1914
- Ceased publication: 2026
- Language: English
- Headquarters: Havre, Montana
- Circulation: 3,500 (as of 2019)
- Website: havredailynews.com

The Havre Weekly Chronicle was a weekly newspaper printed in Havre, Montana, US. The paper serves Hill County and the Hi-Line of north-central Montana, named for the northernmost line of the Burlington Northern Santa Fe Railway, originally built by the Great Northern Railway. It originated in 1914 and was merged into the Cut Bank Pioneer Press in 2026.

== History ==
The Havre Daily Promoter was founded in 1914 by Louis Whitfield Pierson. Three years later he died, and the paper was sold by Maud R. Pierson to O. H. P. Shelly, of Helena for $10,000. In 1925, the Daily Promoter was consolidated with the Evening News to form the Havre Daily News-Promoter. R.G. "Liney" Linebarger became publisher in 1920. He sold the newspaper in 1928 and went on to found the Harve Independent in 1931. Linebarger, and fellow co-owner Sam D. Goza, sold the paper to John Survant, owner of the Philips County News. Wellington D. Rankin was also a co-owner before Linebarger bought him out.

The Havre Daily News was purchased by Scripps League Newspapers in 1963, which spun off its newspapers to form Pioneer News Group in 1974. The company sold the newspaper in 2005 to Robb Hicks, Gary Stevenson and Tom Mullen. In 2011, Stacy Mantle succeeded Martin Cody as publisher of the Havre Daily News, and in 2021 sports editor George Ferguson took over as publisher. In May 2024, the paper moved from daily to weekly publication and changed its name to the Havre Weekly Chronicle. In January 2025, the newspaper was sold to Mullen Newspaper Company. A year later the paper was merged into the Cut Bank Pioneer Press.
