= The Colored Citizen (Montana) =

African American newspaper (1894)

The first issue of The Colored Citizen

The Colored Citizen was an African American newspaper published in Helena, Montana, for two months in 1894. It was published by J. P. Ball, Jr., using finances from white politicians to promote Helena's bid to become state capital over Anaconda in the 1894 Montana capital referendum.

== History ==
The Colored Citizen was a paper for the black community of Helena, Montana—a community of some 279 people—founded in 1894 by J. P. Ball, Jr., the son of James Presley Ball. Ball's father was perhaps the only black photographer in the Pacific Northwest, and the paper was the second paper for a black audience in the region.

The paper pushed for Helena to be the state capital over Anaconda in that year's referendum; Ball said Helena had "No Color Line", a position Ball substantiated with his father's candidacy for city coroner by the Republican Party. While the paper was funded by white politicians to promote Helena's bid to become capital—a common tactic by Republicans in the American West to create support for their policies—it served the local black community through revealing instances of racism in Helena.

The paper believed that black settlers in Montana "can boast of being pioneers" and were authentically American, but that immigrants were not. According to Ball, one of the problems with Anaconda was that a local mining company did "NOT employ a solitary Colored man", but rather "Dagoes and Foreigners". The paper was anti-populist for economic reasons.

The paper was published with four pages each, spanning 17 by 22 inches, from the headquarters of Ball's father's photography company. It ran from September to November 1894, a period of just two months.
