= Coeur d'Alene Press =

Daily newspaper in Idaho, United States

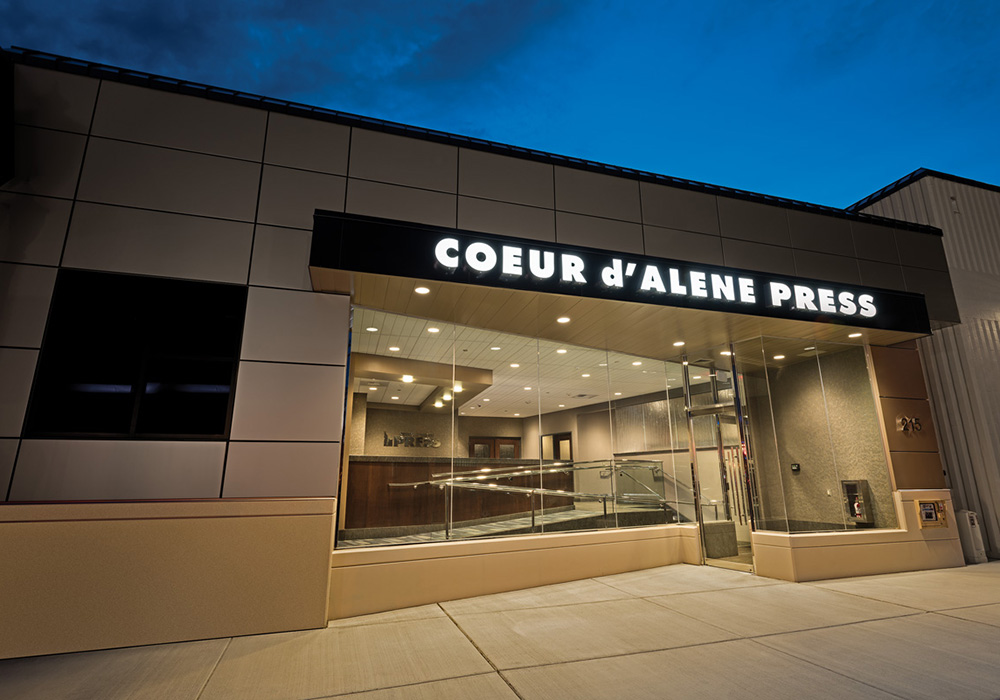
- CDA Press Building
- Type: Daily newspaper
- Format: Broadsheet
- Owner: Hagadone Media Group
- Founder: Joseph T. Scott
- Publisher: Clint Schroeder
- Editor: Maureen Dolan
- Founded: 1892
- Language: English
- Headquarters: 2nd & Lakeside; Coeur d'Alene, Idaho
- ISSN: 1041-2883
- OCLC number: 8800944
- Website: cdapress.com

The Coeur d'Alene Press (or CDA Press) is a daily newspaper based in Coeur d'Alene, Idaho, United States. It is owned by the Hagadone Media Group and is the flagship property of the Idaho Hagadone News Network. The Press provides local coverage for Kootenai County, Idaho. The Coeur d'Alene Press is available six days per week in print (except Monday) and seven days per week online.

== History ==
Joseph T. Scott published the first issue of the Coeur d'Alene Press on February 20, 1892. In his salutation, Scott stated, "The people of Kootenai County are here for a purpose: Nature has placed before them crude material for building up a prosperous and wealthy community... and the Press proposes to be one of the factors in this development."

At its inception, The Press identified itself as an "independent Republican paper, supporting the principles of that party so long as it holds to present doctrines". It was published weekly on Saturdays as four pages with seven columns, but by 1906, it published ten pages of content. This prompted Scott to make the paper a daily on August 6, 1906. He described the Press as "broad gauge independent, but not neutral by this time".

J. T. Scott published the paper for nearly 25 years until his death in 1916. His estate then sold the paper to G. R. Scott. In December 1928, G. R. Scott sold the paper to the Scripps-Canfield company. Burl Hagadone was named publisher of the newspaper in 1936 and purchased half of Scripps Newspapers Inc., stock in the newspaper in April 1946. His son Duane Hagadone succeeded him as publisher in an agreement with Scripps Publishing. In May 1976, Scripps and Hagadone severed their partnership and Hagadone took ownership of six newspapers including the Coeur d'Alene Press. In 2021, owner Duane Hagadone died.
