= Duane Hagadone =

American newspaper publisher (1932–2021)

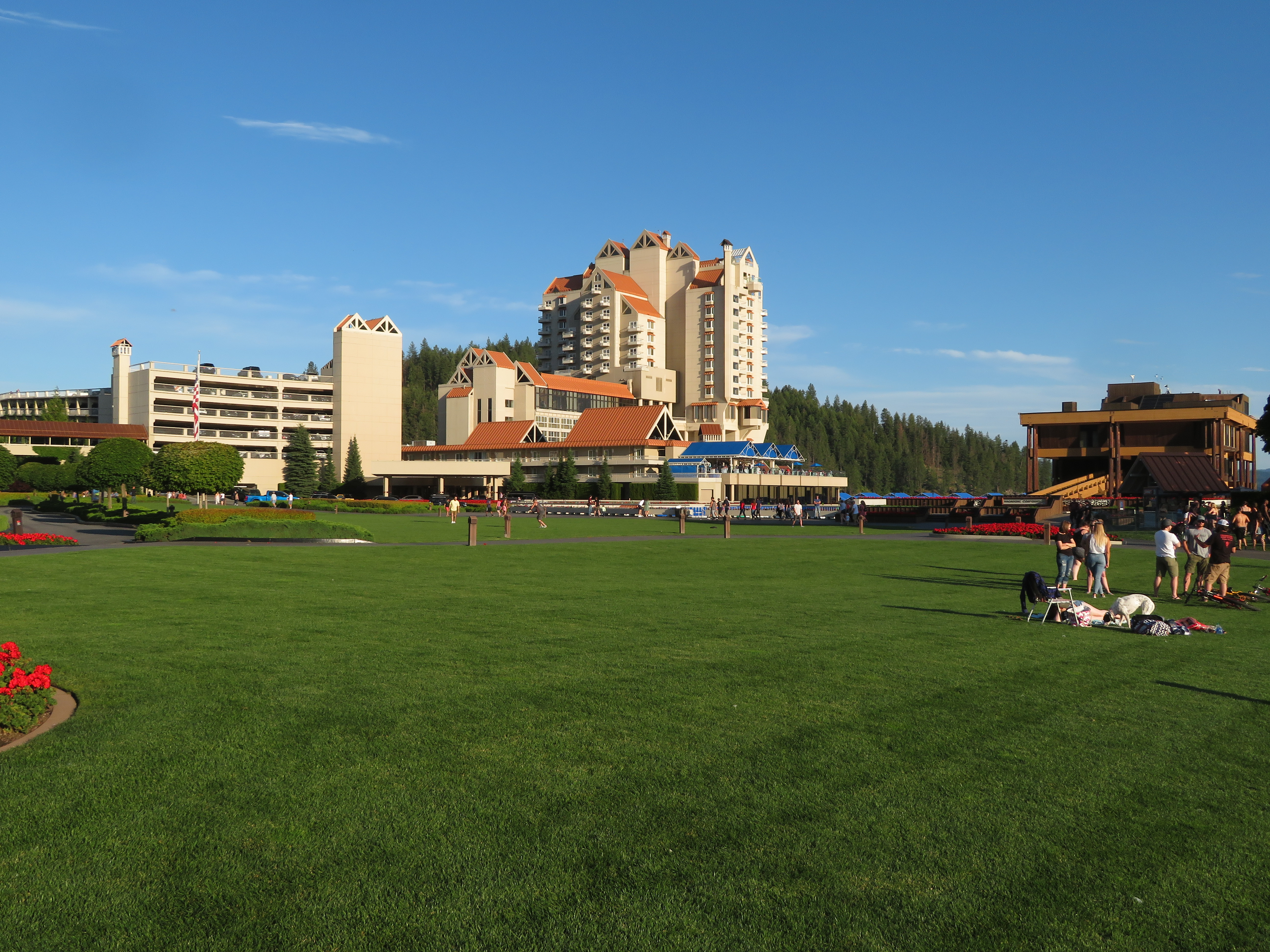
- Hagadone Corporation building (right)
- Born: Duane Burl Hagadone; September 3, 1932; Coeur d'Alene, Idaho, U.S.
- Died: April 24, 2021 (aged 88); Palm Desert, California, U.S.
- Education: University of Idaho (attended)
- Occupations: business executive, real estate and land developer, urban planner, publisher
- Organization: Hagadone Corporation
- Known for: Founder of the Coeur d'Alene Resort and Golf Course
- Spouses: Lola Hagadone; Nancy Jane Collier Hagadone (m. 1953; div. 1969)
- Children: 2 sons
- Awards: Horatio Alger Award
- Website: www.hagadone.com

Duane Burl Hagadone (September 3, 1932 – April 24, 2021) was an American newspaper publisher, urban planner, real estate and land developer.

Hagadone is known as the founder of the Coeur d'Alene Resort and Golf Course in northern Idaho, which has been named by Golf Magazine, Golf Digest, and Golf World Magazine as one of the finest-groomed golf courses in North America, out of 6,500 total golf courses ranked. As the president, CEO, and founder of the Hagadone Corporation, he had holdings in publishing as well as hotel, resort, and casino development. In 2004, he was honored with the Horatio Alger Award by the Horatio Alger Association of Distinguished Americans. In 2006, he was named the Idaho Business Leader of the Year by the Alpha Kappa Psi fraternity of Idaho State University in Pocatello.

== Early life and career ==
Born and raised in Coeur d'Alene, Idaho, Hagadone was the son of Burl and Beverly Hagadone, the only son and oldest of three children in the family. The elder Hagadone began serving as the publisher of the local newspaper, the Coeur d'Alene Press, in 1936. At the time, the newspaper was one of several owned by the E. W. Scripps Company.

As a young boy, Hagadone earned extra money in Coeur d'Alene by taking care of the yard work and landscaping of his neighbors, and gained a newspaper route when he was 11 for the Coeur d'Alene Press. After graduation from Coeur d'Alene High School in 1950, Hagadone attended the University of Idaho in Moscow, but left after six months to join his father in publishing. His first assignment with the newspaper included work in the circulation department, where he sold subscriptions door to door. Before long, he began selling classified ads. He consistently broke sales records for the eight-page newspaper. He was then promoted to advertising salesman, where he served for six years, until his father died in 1959. Just 26 years old at the time, Hagadone was asked by the Scripps Company to step into his father's role as publisher. By the mid-1970s, the Coeur d'Alene Press had become the most successful newspaper in the Scripps group of papers. As a division of Scripps, the Hagadone Newspaper Company had grown to an ownership of 17 newspapers. In 1976, he purchased the Coeur d'Alene Press, along with five other newspapers from the Scripps Company and established the Hagadone Corporation.

Lifestyle

In addition to his home in Coeur d'Alene, Hagadone owned one of the largest estates in Palm Desert, California, covering an area in excess of 64,000 sq ft (5,900 m^{2}). The $30 million home is a futuristic spread which has 19 electronic, moveable glass walls that can open onto the mountain air and the vast network of pools that weave through the property. Hagadone also owned a 203-foot (62 m) yacht Lady Lola, named in honor of his wife. The yacht is equipped with a fully functioning golf course and speed boats to retrieve stray golf balls. The yacht also has its own helipads and helicopters, along with a submarine that can accommodate three people at a time.

== Corporate holdings ==
- Coeur d'Alene Resort
- Best Western Coeur d'Alene Inn and Conference Center
- Hagadone Directories
- Best Western University Inn (Moscow, Idaho)
- Boardwalk Marina
- Silver Beach Marina
- Blackwell Island Marina
- Lake Coeur d'Alene Cruises
- Coeur d'Alene Plaza shopping center
- Blue 541 (advertising agency)
- Quicksilver Photography
- Hagadone Printing Company
- Hagadone Newspaper Group (newspapers in 20 communities in Idaho, Montana, Washington and Wisconsin)

== Honors and awards ==
- 2004: Horatio Alger Award, presented by the Horatio Alger Association of Distinguished Americans
- 2006: Idaho Business Leader of the Year, presented by Alpha Kappa Psi fraternity at Idaho State University
